= Beramana North Grama Niladhari Division =

Beramana North
- Grama Niladhari Division
- Interactive map of Beramana North
- Coordinates: 7.000011°N 80.620059°E
- Country: Sri Lanka
- Province: Central Province
- District: Nuwara Eliya District
- Divisional Secretariat: Kothmale Divisional Secretariat
- Electoral District: Nuwara-Eliya Electoral District
- Polling Division: Kothmale Polling Division

Area
  - Total: 1.34 km^{2} (0.52 sq mi)
- Elevation: 1,050 m (3,440 ft)

Population (2012)
  - Total: 468
  - Density: 349/km^{2} (900/sq mi)
- ISO 3166 code: LK-2303450

Beramana North

Beramana North Grama Niladhari Division is a Grama Niladhari Division of the Kothmale Divisional Secretariat of Nuwara Eliya District of Central Province, Sri Lanka. It has Grama Niladhari Division Code 467D.

Rawanagoda are located within, nearby or associated with Beramana North.

Beramana North is a surrounded by the Wijayabahu Kanda, Beramana, Weerapura and Kolapathana Grama Niladhari Divisions.

== Demographics ==
=== Ethnicity ===
The Beramana North Grama Niladhari Division has a Sinhalese majority (99.8%). In comparison, the Kothmale Divisional Secretariat (which contains the Beramana North Grama Niladhari Division) has a Sinhalese majority (52.6%) and a significant Indian Tamil population (36.4%)

Ethnicity in Beramana North
1. Sinhalese (99.8%)
2. Other (0.20%)

=== Religion ===
The Beramana North Grama Niladhari Division has a Buddhist majority (99.8%). In comparison, the Kothmale Divisional Secretariat (which contains the Beramana North Grama Niladhari Division) has a Buddhist majority (52.3%) and a significant Hindu population (36.5%)

Religion in Beramana North
1. Buddhist (99.8%)
2. Other (0.20%)
