= Assassination of Gamini Dissanayake =

1994 murder of Sri Lankan presidential candidate

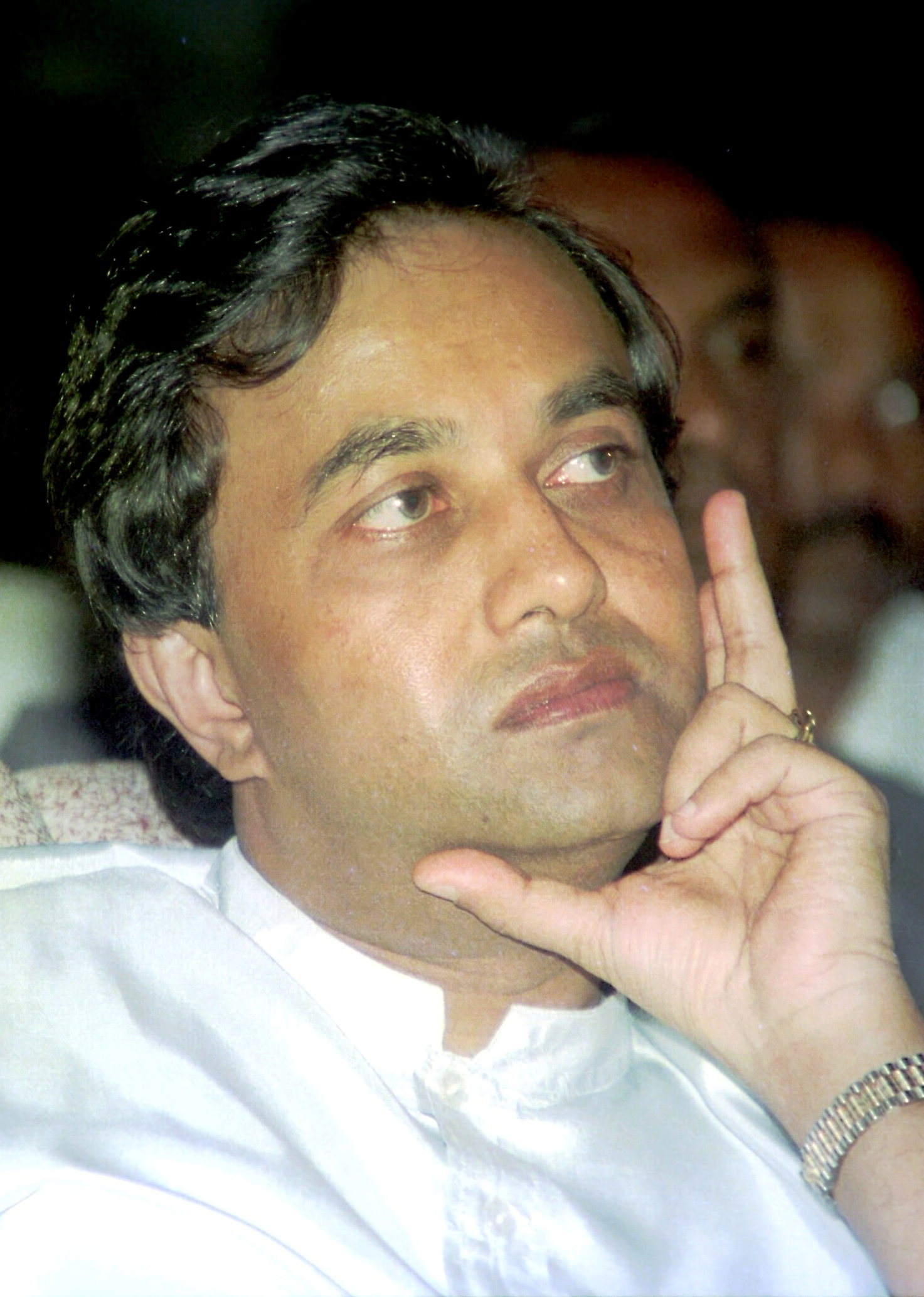
- Location: Colombo, Sri Lanka
- Date: 24 October 1994; 12:10 AM (SLST)
- Target: Gamini Dissanayake
- Attack type: Suicide bombing
- Weapon: Explosives strapped to perpetrator's body
- Deaths: 52 including Dissanayake
- Injuries: 200+ (75 critically)
- Victims: Gamini Dissanayake; Dr. Gamini Wijesekera (Note: The United National Party's general secretary); MP G. M. Premachandra (Note: Cabinet Minister of Labour and Vocational Training at the time); MP Weerasinghe Mallimarachchi; MP Ossie Abeygunasekera; Christie Perera (Note: Former Deputy Mayor of Colombo and the UNP Organizer for Colombo North)
- Perpetrator: Liberation Tigers of Tamil Eelam (suspected)

On 24 October 1994, Sri Lankan parliamentarian Gamini Dissanayake was assassinated by a suicide bomber sent by the Liberation Tigers of Tamil Eelam. Dissanayake was Leader of the Opposition in parliament, and the United National Party's nominee for that year's presidential election. The explosion, set off at a late-night campaign rally in northern Colombo, killed a total of 52 and injured more than 200, with 75 sustaining serious injuries. Among the dead were several other key members of Dissanayake's party.

The assassination came just two and a half weeks before the election, in which Dissanayake was one of two top contenders. Dissanayake's sudden assassination threw both the party and election into turmoil. The party ultimately decided to nominate Dissanyake's wife, Srima Dissanayake, who garnered only 35.91% of the votes and was defeated in a landslide victory for opponent Chandrika Kumaratunga.

The Sri Lankan government was in the middle of negotiating a ceasefire with the LTTE. Peace talks had previously occurred on 12-14 October 1994. Further peace talks planned for later that day in rebel-stronghold Jaffna were called off by President D. B. Wijetunga following the attack on Dissanayake.

== Background ==
=== Dissanayake ===
Gamini Dissanayake (1939–1994) was a prominent Sri Lankan politician, known for his contributions to the country's development and his involvement in the Sri Lankan peace process during a time of civil unrest. He was an influential figure in the country's political and economic development.

Dissanayake entered politics with the United National Party (UNP) in 1970, representing Nuwara Eliya-Maskeliya constituency. Since 1977, he served as Minister of Irrigation, Power, and Highways. Under President J.R. Jayewardene, Dissanayake played a significant role in national infrastructure development. His most notable achievement during this period was spearheading the Mahaweli Development Project, the largest multi-purpose development project in Sri Lanka, focusing on irrigation, hydroelectric power, and agriculture. He held various ministerial positions in the 1980s and early 1990s, focusing on land reforms and agricultural development, including Minister of Lands and Land Development from 1989 to 1994.

In 1994, Dissanayake ran for president in the 1994 presidential election as the UNP candidate. His death was a major blow to Sri Lankan politics, as he was seen as a potential unifying leader who could steer the country through its difficult times.

=== Liberation Tigers of Tamil Eelam ===
The Liberation Tigers of Tamil Eelam (LTTE) were a Tamil militant organization that was based in northeastern Sri Lanka. The LTTE fought to create an independent Tamil state, which they called Tamil Eelam, in the north-east of the island where the majority of Tamils resided. They cited the continuous discrimination and violent persecution against Sri Lankan Tamils by the Sinhalese-dominated Sri Lankan Government as their motive.

Founded in May 1976 by Velupillai Prabhakaran, the LTTE was involved in armed clashes against the Sri Lankan government and its armed forces. Initially starting out as a guerrilla force, the LTTE increasingly came to resemble that of a conventional fighting force with a well-developed military wing that included a navy, an airborne unit, an intelligence wing, and a specialised suicide attack unit. The LTTE popularised and perfected the use of a suicide vest as a weapon, a tactic now used by many current militant organizations.

In the years during and since the civil war, many nations have recognized the LTTE as a terrorist organization. Nations that have designated the LTTE as a terrorist group are: European Union, Canada, India, Malaysia, Sri Lanka, United Kingdom, and United States.

On 24 October 1994, the LTTE employed an unknown female suicide bomber to target and assassinate Dissanayake.

== Assassination ==
Two and a half weeks before the presidential election, Dissanayake participated in a campaign rally for the United National Party. Being the party's nominee for president that year, and being one of the top two contenders, Dissanayake was headlining the event. Dissanayake had participated in four separate campaign events that day in the Kurunegala District, and had arrived in Colombo at around 7:30 PM with G. M. Premachandra, an MP from Kurunegala as well as the Minister of Labour.

The rally ran late into a rainy night, and ended just after midnight. According to eyewitness reports, after finishing his campaign speech, Dissanayake waved to the crowd and said "good night" before looking at his wristwatch and correcting himself, saying "good morning." Immediately thereafter at 12:10AM, a 'powerful' bomb blast went off right at the front of the stage, according to Dissanayake's campaign manager Wickrema Weerasooria. The blast sprayed ball bearings and shrapnel, killing 52 people. Among the deceased were Gamini Dissanayake, the UNP's general secretary Dr. Gamini Wijesekera, Minister of Labour G. M. Premachandra, and two members of parliament (Weerasinghe Mallimarachchi and Ossie Abeygunasekera). Deputy Mayor of Colombo and UNP Organizer for Colombo North K.B. Christie Perera, as well as his daughter K.B. Sriyani Gunasekera also lost their lives. More than 200 others were wounded, with 75 sustaining serious injuries.

== Aftermath ==
There was no immediate claim of responsibility, but it was assumed to be the Tamil Tigers due to its similarity to many other LTTE assassinations, including those of Sri Lankan President Ranasinghe Premadasa in 1993 and Indian prime minister Rajiv Gandhi in 1991.

=== Reactions ===
President D. B. Wijetunga, denounced the incident as a "cowardly and dastardly act," and reimposed an 11-year-old state of emergency that had recently been lifted. He also canceled a second round of peace talks that were scheduled to begin in Jaffna later that day.

Prime Minister Chandrika Kumaratunga, who was also Dissanayake's main opponent in the upcoming presidential election, stated "violence has struck again as the nation moves toward peace and normalcy."

In his 1998 Assignment Colombo, Indian High Commissioner in Sri Lanka J.N. Dixit described Dissanayake as a “nation-builder.”

At a commemoration ceremony held on the 21st anniversary of Dissanayake's death in 2015, then-President Maithripala Sirisena said "I got to know him when I first entered the Parliament in 1989 as an Opposition member. I can remember he showcased a behaviour that was not normally seen in ministers from the ruling party — he was cordial and sociable even with Opposition members of Parliament. During his political life he worked for the development and service of the people.”

=== Impact on 1994 Presidential Election ===
In accordance with Sri Lankan law, Commissioner of Elections R. K. Chandrananda De Silva gave the United National Party three days to submit the name of a new candidate to replace Dissanayake. De Silva stated he didn't think the act would be followed by a general resurgence of violence that would make free and fair elections impossible.

On 25 October 1994, the United National Party chose Srima Dissanayake, wife of Gamini Dissanayake, to take his place as their party's nominee in the election. Srima Dissanayake ran against Sri Lanka Freedom Party candidate and then-Prime Minister Chandrika Kumaratunga. According to party sources, she was chosen over party leader Prime Minister Ranil Wickremesinghe in order to garner sympathy votes. The party also believed that showcasing her as a woman widowed by the Civil War would help to compare her to Kumaratunga, who had lost her husband to an assassination in 1989, as well as former Primer Minister Sirimavo Bandaranaike, who had similarly lost her husband.

On 9 November 1994, two and a half weeks after the assassination, Kumaratunga defeated Dissanayake in the largest landslide victory in Sri Lanka's history, garnering 62.28% of the votes to Dissanayake's 35.91%. Kumaratunga became the first female and longest-serving president in Sri Lanka's history, serving from 1994 to 2005.

== See also ==
- List of people assassinated by the Liberation Tigers of Tamil Eelam
