= Democratic Workers Congress =

Trade union and political party in Sri Lanka

- Leader: Mano Ganeshan
- Founded: 1 January 1956
- Split from: Ceylon Workers' Congress
- Headquarters: 70 Bankshall Street, Colombo

The Democratic Workers Congress is a political party and trade union in Sri Lanka. It was founded by Abdul Aziz and was formally registered on 1 January 1956.

== History ==
The party's origins relate back to the founding of the Ceylon India Congress (CIC) on 25 July 1935, with V. R. M. V. A. Lechumanan Chettiar as its president and Abdul Aziz and H. M. Desai as joint-secretaries. In 1942 Aziz was elected as president of the CIC and Savumiamoorthy Thondaman as its secretary. In 1945 Thondaman defeated Aziz for the presidency of the CIC and in 1948 Aziz regained the presidency. In 1950 the CIC was renamed to the Ceylon Workers' Congress (CWC). In November 1955 the leadership clashes between Aziz and Thondamon came to a head, with Aziz's election as the president of the CWC and Thondaman's candidate, S. Somasundaram, appointed as party secretary, with Thondaman's loyalists voting on 22 November to expel Aziz and his supporters from the CWC. The Aziz faction subsequently formed the Democratic Workers Congress (DWC) registering the party on 1 January 1956. The DWC then joined the World Federation of Trade Unions.

In 1962 a number of key DWC leaders left the party to join the Communist Party workers' union and one of the party's stalwarts, K. G. S. Nair, died of a heart attack. In 1968 M. A. Thangavel and A. K. Kandasamy left the DWC and formed the Agricultural Plantation Workers Congress.

Following Aziz's death in June 1990 there was another split in the DWC, with Aziz's son, Ashraf, forming the Aziz Democratic Workers Congress while the leadership of the DWC was held by V. P. Ganeshan. The DWC is currently led by Ganeshan's son, Mano, who is a member of parliament, representing the Colombo electorate.
