= Donald Jasen Ranaweera =

Sri Lankan plantation owner and politician

The Honourable Donald Ranaweera MBE JP

Member of the Ceylonese Parliament for Maskeliya
- In office 1960–1960
- Preceded by: S. Jinadasa
- Succeeded by: Edmund Wijesuriya

Member of the Ceylonese Parliament for Nuwara Eliya
- In office 1965–1970
- Preceded by: T. William Fernando
- Succeeded by: Gamini Dissanayake

Personal details
- Born: 20 March 1921
- Died: 26 December 2000 (aged 79)
- Party: United National Party
- Occupation: plantation owner and press baron

Donald Jasen Ranaweera (20 March 1921 - 26 December 2000) was a Sri Lankan plantation owner, press baron and politician. He was the Chairmen of the Times of Ceylon and served as the member of parliament from Maskeliya (1960) and Nuwara Eliya (1965-1970).

== Early life ==
Born to a wealthy land and plantation owning family from Yatiyana, Matara. He was Educated at St.Thomas' College, Mount Lavinia and Trinity College, Kandy.The family fortune was founded by his grandfather, Yatiyana Ralahamay. Donald Ranaweera's father, Don Andreas Ranaweera expanded the land and wealth he inherited from his father, Yatiyana Ralahamy. He also bought the Panilkanda Estate in Deniyaya and later acquired Fetteresso and Attabagie Group in Dickoya and Gampola. Yatiyana 'Sisiragiri' Walawua was also built by his father Don Andreas Ranaweera and it was the family seat where he served as the Chairman of the local village council.

Taking over the family businesses, Donald J Ranaweera became a wealthy financier owning several plantations and served as the Chairman of the Times of Ceylon with H. W. Amarasuriya serving as Deputy Chairmen. D. J. Ranaweera along with H. W. Amarasuriya were the two wealthiest landed proprietors of post-independent Ceylon.

== Political career ==
Donald Ranaweera was elected from the Maskeliya electorate from the United National Party in the 1960 March general election defeating the incumbent S. Jinadasa from the Mahajana Eksath Peramuna and P. Gamini Ariyatilake from the Lanka Sama Samaja Party. He was defeated in the 1960 July general election by Edmund Wijesuriya of the Sri Lanka Freedom Party. He then contested the 1965 general election from the Nuwara Eliya electorate from the United National Party and won. In 1970, he was refused nominations from the United National Party for the 1970 general election from Nuwara Eliya in favor of the young Gamini Dissanayake by Dudley Senanayake, whose first bid for parliament in the 1970 general election from his late father's party, Sri Lanka Freedom Party had been refused in favor of T. William Fernando. The angered Ranaweera, contested the 1970 general election from the Maskeliya electorate as an independent and polled fourth. In the 1970s he lost most of his holdings to government takeover. His plantations were nationalized under the land reforms and the Ceylon Times Group following several years of financial mismanagement was nationalized under the Sri Lanka Freedom Party government.

== Honors ==
He was appointed a Justice of Peace and a Member of the Most Excellent Order of the British Empire in the 1955 Birthday Honours for public services.

== Family ==
He married Sumithra Rambukwelle, they had ten children and their daughter Kalyani Viveca, married Dr Shirantha Ratwatte.
