= Andrew Dissanayake =

Sri Lankan politician (1910–1983)

Mudiyanselage Andrew Dissanayake (7 November 1910 – 23 March 1983) was a Ceylonese businessman, landowner and politician.

Dissanayake contested the 3rd parliamentary election, held between 5 April 1956 and 10 April 1956, in the Nuwara Eliya electorate. He ran as the Sri Lanka Freedom Party candidate defeating the sitting United National Party member, P. P. Sumanatilaka, by 1,673 votes.

Dissanayake served as the Parliamentary Secretary to the Minister of Nationalised Services and Shipping in the S. W. R. D. Bandaranaike and Dahanayake cabinets, between 1959 and 1960.

He married Welegedara Samaratunga née Kumarihamy from Kotmale and they had seven children. His eldest son, Gamini, was the member for Nuwara Eliya-Maskeliya and a candidate in the 1994 presidential election, before he was assassinated in October 1994. His grandson, Navin, is the current member for the Nuwara Eliya Electoral District and the Minister of Plantation Industries.
