= Karuppiah Kumaravelu =

Ceylonese politician

Hon. Karuppiah Kumaravelu

Member of the Ceylon Parliament for Kotagala
- In office 1947–1952
- Preceded by: seat created
- Succeeded by: Ukku Banda Unamboowe

Personal details
- Born: Karuppiah Kumaravelu; 3 September 1921
- Party: Ceylon India Congress
- Profession: politician

Karuppiah Kumaravelu (born 3 September 1921) was a Ceylonese politician.

Kumaravelu was elected at the 1st parliamentary election, held between 23 August 1947 and 20 September 1947, representing the Ceylon India Congress in the Kotagala electorate, securing 53.5% of the total vote, 3,543 votes ahead of his nearest rival.

Kumaravelu, the nephew of Savumiamoorthy Thondaman, a founding member of the Ceylon India Congress, was one of seven CIC members elected to parliament in 1947.

In 1948 the Parliament passed the Ceylon Citizenship Act and subsequently in 1949 passed the Ceylon (Parliamentary Elections) Amendment Act No.48, whereby Indian citizens were unable to contest for parliamentary seats or vote; as a result Kumaravelu was unable to contest his seat at the next parliamentary elections.
