= Praba Ganesan =

Sri Lankan politician

Hon. Praba Ganesan
- பிரபா கணேசன்

Deputy Minister of Telecommunication & Information Technology
- In office 2014–2015

Member of Parliament for Colombo District
- In office 2010–2015

Member of the Western Provincial Council for Colombo District
- In office 2004–2010

Personal details
- Born: 4 January 1964 (age 62)
- Party: Democratic People's Congress
- Other political affiliations: United People's Freedom Alliance

Adawan Prabaharan Ganesan (Tamil: பிரபா கணேசன்; born 4 January 1964) is a Sri Lankan politician and former member of parliament. He is the current leader of the Democratic People's Congress (DPC), a member of the United People's Freedom Alliance (UPFA).

== Early life and family ==
Ganesan was born on 4 January 1964. He is a son of V. P. Ganesan, trade unionist and film producer, and brother of Mano Ganesan, Member of Parliament.

== Career ==
Ganesan contested the 2004 provincial council election as one of the Western People's Front's candidates in Colombo District and was elected to the Western Provincial Council. He was re-elected at the 2009 provincial council election, this times as a United National Front (UNF) candidate.

Ganesan contested the 2010 parliamentary election as one of the UNF candidates in Colombo District. He was elected and entered Parliament. In August 2010 Ganesan defected to the governing United People's Freedom Alliance (UPFA). He was suspended from the Democratic People's Front. He subsequently founded a political party called the Democratic Peoples Congress.

Ganesan was appointed Deputy Minister of Telecommunication and Information Technology on 21 August 2014. At the 2015 presidential election, whilst other Indian Tamil politicians flocked to support common opposition candidate Maithripala Sirisena, Ganesan remained loyal to President Mahinda Rajapaksa, leader of the UPFA. Following Sirisena's victory Ganesan lost his ministerial position.

Ganesan did not contest the 2015 parliamentary election but was instead placed on the UPFA's list of National List candidates. However, after the election he was not appointed to the National List.

== Electoral history ==
Electoral history of Praba Ganesan
Election	Constituency	Party	Votes	Result
2004 provincial	Colombo District	WPF	6,459	Elected
2009 provincial	Colombo District	UNF	45,899	Elected
2010 parliamentary	Colombo District	UNF	42,851	Elected

== See also ==
- List of political families in Sri Lanka
