= Nuwara Eliya Electoral District (1947–1989) =

Former electoral district of Sri Lanka

Nuwara Eliya electoral district was an electoral district of Sri Lanka between August 1947 and July 1977. The district was named after the City of Nuwara Eliya in Nuwara Eliya District, Central Province. The 1978 Constitution of Sri Lanka introduced the proportional representation electoral system for electing members of Parliament. The existing 160 mainly single-member electoral districts were replaced with 22 multi-member electoral districts. Nuwara Eliya electoral district was replaced by the Nuwara Eliya multi-member electoral district at the 1989 general elections, the first under the proportional representation system, Nuwara Eliya continues to be a polling division of the multi-member electoral district.

== Members of Parliament ==
Key

Independent SLFP UNP

Election	Member	Party	Term
1947	Savumiamoorthy Thondaman	Ceylon India Congress	1947-1952
1952	P. P. Sumanatilaka	United National Party	1952-1956
1956	M. A. D. Dissanayake	Sri Lanka Freedom Party	1956-1960
1960 (March)	T. William Fernando	Sri Lanka Freedom Party	1960-1965
1960 (July)	T. William Fernando	Sri Lanka Freedom Party	1960-1965
1965	D. J. Ranaweera	United National Party	1965-1970
1970	Gamini Dissanayake	United National Party	1970-1977
1972 by-election	Gamini Dissanayake	United National Party	1970-1977

== Elections ==
=== 1947 Parliamentary General Election ===
Results of the 1st parliamentary election held between 23 August 1947 and 20 September 1947:

Candidate	Party	Symbol	Votes	%
Savumiamoorthy Thondaman	Ceylon Workers' Congress	Star	9,386	66.69
James Thevathasam Rutnam		Hand	3,251	23.10
Lorensz Perera		Elephant	1,124	7.99
Valid Votes			13,761	97.78
Rejected Votes			313	2.22
Total Polled			14,074	100.00
Registered Electors			24,295	
Turnout				57.93

=== 1952 Parliamentary General Election ===
Results of the 2nd parliamentary election held between 24 May 1952 and 30 May 1952:

Candidate	Party	Symbol	Votes	%
P. P. Sumanatilaka	United National Party	Star	3,852	64.10
Vijayaratanam Vijayaratnasingham		Lamp	849	14.13
James Thevathasam Rutnam		Elephant	842	14.01
Anthony Joseph Meary de Silva		Hand	391	6.50
Valid Votes			5,934	98.75
Rejected Votes			75	1.25
Total Polled			6,009	100.00
Registered Electors			9,279	
Turnout				64.76

=== 1956 Parliamentary General Election ===
Results of the 3rd parliamentary election held between 5 April 1956 and 10 April 1956:

Candidate	Party	Symbol	Votes	%
M. A. D. Dissanayake	Sri Lanka Freedom Party	Hand	4,681	60.36
P. P. Sumanatilaka	United National Party	Elephant	3,008	38.79
Valid Votes			7,689	99.15
Rejected Votes			66	0.85
Total Polled			7,755	100.00
Registered Electors			11,844	
Turnout				65.48

=== 1960 (March) Parliamentary General Election ===
Results of the 4th parliamentary election held on 19 March 1960:

Candidate	Party	Symbol	Votes	%
T. William Fernando	Sri Lanka Freedom Party	Hand	2,397	
Peter Mellaratchy	United National Party	Elephant	1,969	
Savumiamoorthy Thondaman	Ceylon Workers' Congress	Tree	1,940	
E. Wanigasekera		Scales	1,100	
U. K. Wilfred Silva		Key	843	
K. R. A. Pelpola		Umbrella	322	
Rajah Seneviratne		Sewing Machine	320	
D. K. D. Jinendrapala		Star	240	
Hubert Medagama		Clock	56	
Valid Votes			9,187	99.28
Rejected Votes			67	0.72
Total Polled			9,254	100.00
Registered Electors			12,195	
Turnout				75.88

=== 1960 (July) Parliamentary General Election ===
Results of the 5th parliamentary election held on 20 July 1960:

Candidate	Party	Symbol	Votes	%
T. William Fernando	Sri Lanka Freedom Party	Hand	4,257	49.34
P. P. Sumanatilaka	United National Party	Elephant	3,421	39.65
Edmund Wanigasekera		Cartwheel	891	10.33
Valid Votes			8,569	99.32
Rejected Votes			59	0.68
Total Polled			8,628	100.00
Registered Electors			12,195	
Turnout				70.75

=== 1965 Parliamentary General Election ===
Results of the 6th parliamentary election held on 22 March 1965:

Candidate	Party	Symbol	Votes	%
D. J. Ranaweera	United National Party	Elephant	10,347	64.24
T. William Fernando	Sri Lanka Freedom Party	Hand	5,509	34.20
N. Sivagnanam		Bell	87	0.54
Valid Votes			15,943	98.97
Rejected Votes			165	1.02
Total Polled			16,108	100.00
Registered Electors			19,688	
Turnout				81.82

=== 1970 Parliamentary General Election ===
Results of the 7th parliamentary election held on 27 May 1970:

Candidate	Party	Symbol	Votes	%
Gamini Dissanayake	United National Party	Elephant	10,887	54.41
T. William Fernando	Sri Lanka Freedom Party	Hand	8,810	44.03
C. V. Velupillai		Lamp	170	0.85
Valid Votes			19,867	99.29
Rejected Votes			143	0.71
Total Polled			20,010	100.00
Registered Electors			24,027	
Turnout				83.28

=== 1972 Parliamentary By-Election ===
Results of the parliamentary by-election held on 9 October 1972:

Candidate	Party	Symbol	Votes	%
Gamini Dissanayake	United National Party	Elephant	11,963	53.39
Herath Mudiyanselage Abeysinghe		Hand	10,092	45.04
Bandara Weerakoon Madawala		Cartwheel	98	0.44
Don Seneviratne		Lamp	92	0.41
P. Murugiah Abiman		Sun	52	0.23
Valid Votes			22,297	99.50
Rejected Votes			112	0.50
Total Polled			22,409	100.00
Registered Electors			24,027	
Turnout				93.27
