= Tamils in Sri Lanka =

Tamils in Sri Lanka may refer to:

- Indian Tamils of Sri Lanka - a Tamil people of Indian origin living in Sri Lanka, also known as Hill Country Tamils or Up Country Tamils.
- Sri Lankan Tamils - a Tamil people of Sri Lankan origin living in Sri Lanka.
