= Tamil Indians =

Indian Tamils may refer to:

- Tamil people from or living in India
- Indian Tamils of Sri Lanka
