= Godamaditta Grama Niladhari Division =

Godamaditta
- Grama Niladhari Division
- Interactive map of Godamaditta
- Coordinates: 7.037244°N 80.621989°E
- Country: Sri Lanka
- Province: Central Province
- District: Nuwara Eliya District
- Divisional Secretariat: Kothmale Divisional Secretariat
- Electoral District: Nuwara-Eliya Electoral District
- Polling Division: Kothmale Polling Division

Area
  - Total: 1.31 km^{2} (0.51 sq mi)
- Elevation: 1,330 m (4,360 ft)

Population (2012)
  - Total: 897
  - Density: 685/km^{2} (1,770/sq mi)
- ISO 3166 code: LK-2303185

Godamaditta

Godamaditta Grama Niladhari Division is a Grama Niladhari Division of the Kothmale Divisional Secretariat of Nuwara Eliya District of Central Province, Sri Lanka. It has Grama Niladhari Division Code 462B.

Godamaditta is a surrounded by the Dombagasthalawa, Katugolla, Thispane Kanda, Wataddara and Rojersangama North Grama Niladhari Divisions.

== Demographics ==
=== Ethnicity ===
The Godamaditta Grama Niladhari Division has a Sinhalese majority (95.4%). In comparison, the Kothmale Divisional Secretariat (which contains the Godamaditta Grama Niladhari Division) has a Sinhalese majority (52.6%) and a significant Indian Tamil population (36.4%)

Ethnicity in Godamaditta
1. Sinhalese (95.4%)
2. Sri Lankan Tamil (4.50%)
3. Other (0.10%)

=== Religion ===
The Godamaditta Grama Niladhari Division has a Buddhist majority (95.4%). In comparison, the Kothmale Divisional Secretariat (which contains the Godamaditta Grama Niladhari Division) has a Buddhist majority (52.3%) and a significant Hindu population (36.5%)

Religion in Godamaditta
1. Buddhist (95.4%)
2. Hindu (4.60%)
3. Other (0.00%)
