= Abdul Aziz (Sri Lankan politician) =

Indian-born Ceylonese politician and trade unionist

Hon. Abdul Aziz

Member of the Ceylon Parliament for Appointed
- In office 7 June 1970 – 22 May 1972

Member of the Ceylon Parliament for Maskeliya
- In office 1950–1952
- Preceded by: G. R. Motha
- Succeeded by: P. H. C. Silva

Personal details
- Born: Abdul Aziz; 6 October 1912
- Died: 5 June 1990 (aged 82)
- Party: Ceylon Workers' Congress (before 1956); Democratic Workers Congress (after 1956)
- Occupation: politician
- Profession: Trade Unionist

Abdul Aziz (6 October 1912 – 5 June 1990) was an Indian-born Ceylonese politician and trade unionist. He was elected to the first Parliament of Ceylon in March 1950 representing the Ceylon Indian Congress as the member for the Maskeliya electorate, at a parliamentary by-election, following the death of the sitting member, G. R. Motha.

Aziz was born in India and educated at the Bombay University before moving to Ceylon to join his father. Aziz one of the founding members of the Ceylon Indian Congress (CIC), which was formed on 15 July 1939, with Aziz as one of the joint secretaries, following a visit by Jawaharlal Nehru to Ceylon, In 1942 he was elected as the president of the CIC Labour Union. In March 1943 Aziz attacked the government for its anti-Indianism and for neglecting estate labour and as a result was charged with causing disaffection against the government and obstructing the war effort. He was arrested and tried in the Supreme Court, where he was acquitted. In 1944 Aziz led the CIC delegation before the Soulbury Commission requesting constitutional safeguards for the citizenship and voting rights of the people of recent Indian origin but failed to get any substantial guarantees from the Commission.

In 1950 the CIC was renamed the Ceylon Workers Congress (CWC). In 1956, as a result of leadership rivalries between the president, Savumiamoorthy Thondaman, and Aziz, who was the general secretary, Aziz formed the Democratic Workers Congress (DWC).

In 1970 he was appointed as a member of parliament, by the United Front government. However the 1972 Republican Constitution subsequently abolished the appointed member system.
