= Unamboowe =

Unamboowe is a surname. Notable people with the surname include:

- Heshan Unamboowe (born 1992), Sri Lankan swimmer
- Ukku Banda Unamboowe, Ceylonese politician
