= S. Jinadasa =

Sri Lankan politician

Hon. S. Jinadasa

Member of the Ceylonese Parliament for Maskeliya
- In office 19 April 1956 – 5 December 1959
- Preceded by: P. H. C. Silva
- Succeeded by: Donald J. Ranaweera

Personal details
- Born: Sooriyasena Jinadasa
- Party: Sri Lanka Freedom Party
- Occupation: politician

Sooriyasena Jinadasa was a Ceylonese politician. He was the member of the Parliament of Sri Lanka for Maskeliya, representing the Sri Lanka Freedom Party.

Jinadasa contested the 3rd parliamentary election, held between 5 April 1956 and 10 April 1956, in Maskeliya electorate. He was elected, securing 3,228 votes (45.9% of the total vote) and defeating the sitting member, Palahennedi Hewage Charles Silva from the United National Party, by 214 votes. At the 4th parliamentary election, held on 19 March 1960, he ran this time as a member of the Mahajana Eksath Peramuna but was unable to retain his seat, losing to Donald J. Ranaweera, from the United National Party by 1,161 votes.
