= Veloo Annamalay =

Ceylonese politician

Veloo Annamalay was a Ceylonese politician. He was an appointed member of the Parliament of Sri Lanka. He was a member of the Ceylon Workers' Congress, he served as its treasurer. His daughter Anushiya Sivarajah served as a Minister of the Central Provincial Council and general secretary of the Ceylon Workers' Congress.
