= P. H. C. Silva =

Ceylonese politician

Hon. P. H. C. Silva
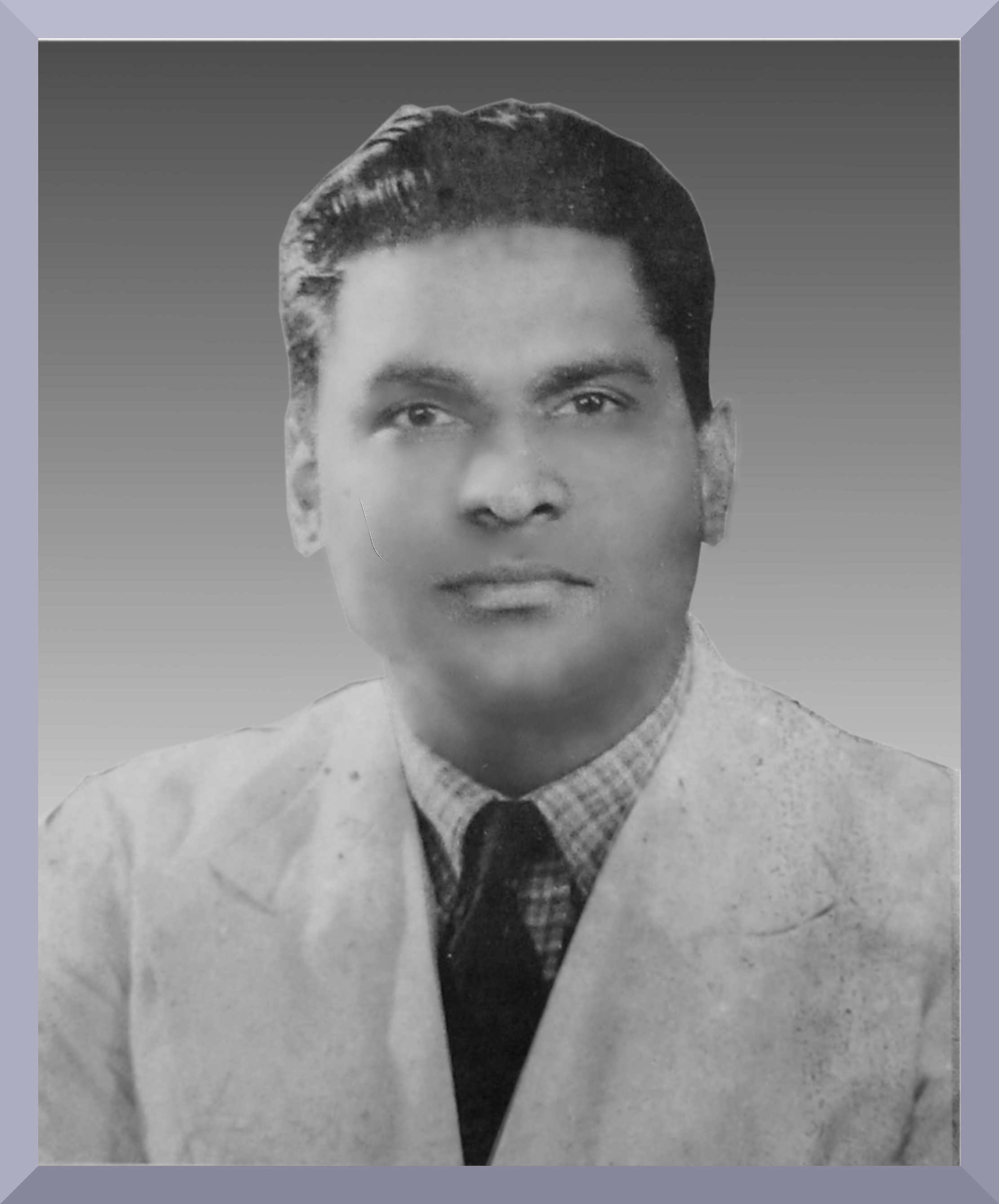
- Motor Driver's certificate of competence.

Member of the Ceylon Parliament for Maskeliya
- In office 1952–1956
- Preceded by: Abdul Aziz
- Succeeded by: S. Jinadasa

Personal details
- Born: Palahennedi Hewage Charles Silva; 29 December 1917 Kathaluwa, Ahangama
- Died: 1995
- Party: United National Party
- Spouse: Eva Elizabeth née Wijesinghe
- Children: Thissa, Dushyanthi, Rajinda, Ishara
- Education: Mahinda College, Galle; Nalanda College, Colombo; University of Ceylon, Colombo

Palahennedi Hewage Charles Silva (29 December 1917 - ?) was a rubber plantation owner and a Ceylonese politician.

He served as the chairman of the Madhyama Lanka Bus Company, Lanka Airlines and Distilleries Ltd, as well as a director of United Rubber and Coconut Manufacturers, The Trust Company, and Automobile and General Engineers. He was a partner of Mousakanda Group E43, a mixed plantation in Rattota, Matale District.

Silva contested the 2nd parliamentary election, held between 24 May 1952 and 30 May 1952, as the United National Party in the seat of Maskeliya. He was elected, receiving 3,415 votes (59% of the total vote), 2,459 votes ahead of his nearest rival.

In 1955 he moved a motion, which resulted in the establishment of a pension fund for members of parliament. He also proposed a motion, calling on the government to appoint a constituent assembly, to draft a new constitution for Ceylon on 6 December 1955. He was unable to retain his seat at the 3rd parliamentary election, held between 5 April 1956 and 10 April 1956, losing to the Sri Lanka Freedom Party candidate, S. Jinadasa, by 314 votes.

Silva was married to Eva Elizabeth née Wijesinghe (d. 11 February 2011), with whom he had four children: Thissa, Dushyanthi, Rajinda and Ishara.
