= Aziz Democratic Workers Congress =

- President: Ashraf Aziz
- Founder: Ashraf Aziz
- Founded: 1990
- Split from: Democratic Workers Congress

Aziz Democratic Workers Congress is a political party and trade union in Sri Lanka. As of 2005 the president of A.D.W.C. was Ashraf Aziz.
