= Kotagala Electoral District =

Electoral district of Sri Lanka

Kotagala electoral district was an electoral district of Sri Lanka between August 1947 and March 1960. The district was named after the town of Kotagala in Nuwara Eliya District, Central Province. The 1978 Constitution of Sri Lanka introduced the proportional representation electoral system for electing members of Parliament. The existing 160 mainly single-member electoral districts were replaced with 22 multi-member electoral districts. Kotagala electoral district was replaced by the Nuwara Eliya multi-member electoral district at the 1989 general elections, the first under the proportional representation system.

== Members of Parliament ==
Key

Independent SLFP UNP

Election	Member	Party	Term
1947	Karuppiah Kumaravelu	Ceylon Indian Congress	1947 - 1952
1952	Ukku Banda Unamboowe	United National Party	1952 - 1956
1956	J. D. Weerasekara	Sri Lanka Freedom Party	1956 - 1960

== Elections ==
=== 1947 Parliamentary General Election ===
Results of the 1st parliamentary election held between 23 August 1947 and 20 September 1947:

Candidate	Party	Symbol	Votes	%
Karuppiah Kumaravelu	Ceylon India Congress	Elephant	6,722	53.50
U. B. Jayasundera	Independent	Cartwheel	3,179	25.30
T. Edwards	United National Party	Hand	1,175	9.35
E. Wanigasekera		Key	782	6.22
S. Chelliah		Star	251	2.00
Valid Votes			12,109	96.38
Rejected Votes			455	3.62
Total Polled			12,564	100.00
Registered Electors			17,092	
Turnout				73.51

=== 1952 Parliamentary General Election ===
Results of the 2nd parliamentary election held between 24 May 1952 and 30 May 1952:

Candidate	Party	Symbol	Votes	%
Ukku Banda Unamboowe	United National Party	Hand	2,711	46.22
J. D. Weerasekera	Independent	Wheel	1,577	26.89
U. B. Jayasundera	Independent	Star	774	13.20
K. M. Bandara	Sri Lanka Freedom Party	Elephant	741	12.63
Valid Votes			5,803	98.94
Rejected Votes			62	1.06
Total Polled			5,865	100.00
Registered Electors			7,749	
Turnout				75.69

=== 1956 Parliamentary General Election ===
Results of the 3rd parliamentary election held between 5 April 1956 and 10 April 1956:

Candidate	Party	Symbol	Votes	%
J. D. Weerasekera	Sri Lanka Freedom Party	Hand	4,130	60.68
Ukku Banda Unamboowe	United National Party	Elephant	2,607	38.30
Valid Votes			6,737	98.99
Rejected Votes			69	1.01
Total Polled			6,806	100.00
Registered Electors			8,898	
Turnout				76.49
