= Navin Dissanayake =

Sri Lankan politician

Hon. Navin Dissanayake
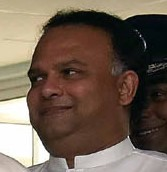
- Dissanayake in May 2017

Governor of Sabaragamuwa
- In office 13 June 2023 – 23 September 2024
- President: Ranil Wickremesinghe
- Prime Minister: Dinesh Gunawardena
- Preceded by: Tikiri Kobbekaduwa
- Succeeded by: Champa Janaki Rajaratne

Minister of Plantation Industries
- In office 4 September 2015 – 21 November 2019
- President: Maithripala Sirisena
- Prime Minister: Ranil Wickremesinghe
- Preceded by: Lakshman Kiriella

Minister of Sports
- In office 19 January 2015 – 4 September 2015
- President: Maithripala Sirisena
- Prime Minister: Ranil Wickremesinghe
- Preceded by: Mahindananda Aluthgamage
- Succeeded by: Dayasiri Jayasekara

Member of Parliament for Nuwara Eliya District
- In office 2000–2020

Personal details
- Born: September 9, 1969 (age 56)
- Party: United National Party (2000–2007, since 2014); United People's Freedom Alliance (2007–2014)
- Spouse(s): Lanka Dissanayake (née Jayasuriya)
- Relations: Mayantha (brother); Varuni (sister)
- Children: Mahita and Samadhee
- Parent(s): Gamini Dissanayake; Srima Dissanayake
- Education: University of London Institute in Paris
- Profession: Lawyer

Navin Eranjan Dissanayake (born 9 September 1969) is a Sri Lankan politician, and former Minister of Plantation Industries. He is a former Member of Parliament of the United National Party from the Nuwara Eliya District. He also served as Governor of the Sabaragamuwa Province from 2023 to 2024.

Dissanayake is the eldest son of Gamini Dissanayake, former UNP presidential candidate, and grandson of Andrew Dissanayake. His younger brother, Mayantha Dissanayake is an MP for UNP from the Kandy District. He was educated at S. Thomas' Preparatory School and Royal College Colombo.

He is an Attorney-at-law in Sri Lanka, and holds a master's degree in Finance and Financial Law from University of London. Dissanayake graduated from the University of Sussex in Law and was called to the Bar in the United Kingdom as a Barrister at Law from the Middle Temple.

Dissanayake is married to Dr. Lanka Jayasuriya, daughter of Karu Jayasuriya, who holds a position in the World Health Organization, Sri Lanka as a National Professional Officer. The couple has two daughters, Samdhee and Mahita.

== See also ==
- List of political families in Sri Lanka
