= Naan Ungal Thozhan =

- Directed by: S. V. Chandran
- Written by: Kalaichelvan
- Produced by: V. P. Ganesan
- Starring: V. P. Ganesan; Subashini; S. Ramdass
- Cinematography: Vamadevan
- Edited by: S. V. Chandran
- Music by: M. K. Rocksamy
- Production company: Ganesh Films
- Release date: 6 January 1978 (Sri Lanka)
- Country: Sri Lanka
- Language: Tamil

Naan Ungal Thozhan (transl. I am your friend) is a 1978 Sri Lankan Tamil-language film directed by S. V. Chandran. The film stars V. P. Ganesan, Subashini, T.S. Loganathan and S. Ramdass.

== Plot ==
Kannan (V. P. Ganesan) is the doctor in a village hospital. A village girl, Radha (Subashini), likes Kannan and indicates her love to Kannan. But Kannan does not accept. Rajan (Lathief) is a rich young man and the son of the village landlord (Jawahar). He loves Radha. When he learns that Radha loves Kannan, he wants to take revenge on Kannan. One day Radha takes refuge in Kannan's hospital to escape from Rajan. She takes a medicine mistaking it for water. She gets fainted. Rajan comes and molests her. People think it was Kannan who molested Radha. However, Rajan confesses and all ends well.

== Cast ==
The list was compiled from a review published in ourjaffna.com

Male cast

- V. P. Ganesan
- S. Ramdass
- M. M. A. Lathief
- K. A. Jawahar
- T.S.Loganathan
- M. R. Kalaichelvan
- S. N. Thanaratnam
- Vimal Sokkanathan
- Haridas

Female cast

- Subashini
- Rukmani Devi
- Jenita
- Chandrakala
- Jayadevi

== Production ==
The film was produced by V. P. Ganesan under his own banner Ganesh Films and was directed by S. V. Chandran who also edited the film. Screenplay and dialogues were penned by Kalaichelvan. Vamadevan handled the cinematography.

V. P. Ganesan, who was also a trade unionist in Sri Lanka, is the only one who produced 3 Tamil films in Sri Lanka. Shooting was done in several locations in Colombo, Jaffna, Batticaloa, Trincomallee and Kandy.

== Soundtrack ==
Music was composed by M. K. Rocksamy and the lyrics were penned by Shanthi, Murugaverl and Sadhu. Playback singers are K. S. Balachandran, Mohideen Baig, V. Muthazhagu, Kalavathi and Kanagambal.
