= Ukku Banda Unamboowe =

Ceylonese politician

Hon. Ukku Banda Unamboowe OBE

Member of the Ceylon Parliament for Kotagala
- In office 1952–1956
- Preceded by: Karuppiah Kumaravelu
- Succeeded by: J. D. Weerasekera

Personal details
- Born: Ukku Banda Unamboowe Kotmale
- Party: United National Party
- Spouse: Mallika née Galagoda
- Profession: tea planter, politician

Ukku Banda Unamboowe was a Ceylonese politician.

Unamboowe attended Trinity College, Kandy and in 1924 was appointed Rate Mahatmaya (Chief Headman) of Kotmale. He married Mallika née Galagoda (daughter of Madduma Banda Galagoda, Basnayake Nilame of Pattini Devale Kandy). and in 1952 he was granted an OBE in the New Year's Honours, for agricultural services in Kotmale.

At the 1st parliamentary election in 1947 K. Kumaravelu of the Ceylon Indian Congress was voted in as the member for Kotagala. In 1948 the Parliament passed the Ceylon Citizenship Act and subsequently in 1949 passed the Ceylon (Parliamentary Elections) Amendment Act No.48, whereby Indian citizens were unable to contest for parliamentary seats or vote, as a result the seat become vacant.

Unambooke was appointed as the United National Party candidate winning the Kotagala electorate at the subsequent 1952 parliamentary election, securing 46% of the total vote, 1,134 votes ahead of his nearest rival. At the 3rd parliamentary election, held in April 1956, Unambooke failed to retain his seat losing to J. D. Weerasekera of the Sri Lanka Freedom Party by 1,523 votes.
