= J. D. Weerasekera =

Ceylonese politician (1917–2011)

Hon. J. D. Weerasekera

Member of the Ceylon Parliament for Kotagala
- In office 1956–1960
- Preceded by: U. B. Unamboowe
- Succeeded by: seat abolished

Member of Parliament for Kotmale
- In office 1960–1965
- Preceded by: seat created
- Succeeded by: D. B. Ranatunga
- In office 1970–1977
- Preceded by: D. B. Ranatunga
- Succeeded by: Ananda Dassanayake

Personal details
- Born: Jinadasa Don Weerasekera; 23 October 1917 Kotmale
- Died: 2011 (aged 93–94)
- Party: Sri Lanka Freedom Party
- Other political affiliations: Lanka Prajathanthravadi Pakshaya
- Spouse: Zita Millicent née Amaratunge
- Children: Nilanthie, Tissa, Kanthie
- Profession: tea planter, politician

Jinadasa Don Weerasekera (23 October 1917–2011) was a Ceylonese politician and cabinet minister.

Weerasekera was educated at S. Thomas' College, Mount Lavinia and Ananda College, Colombo which after graduating was employed in the plantation industry. In 1951 he was elected to the Madapane Village Council and became its chairman. In 1952 at the 2nd parliamentary election, held between 24 May and 30 May, he contested the seat of Kotagala, as an Independent candidate but was defeated, securing 3,179 votes (25% of the total vote). At the 3rd parliamentary election, held between 5 April 1956 and 10 April 1956, Weerasekera was elected, representing the Sri Lanka Freedom Party, defeating the United National Party incumbent Ukku Banda Unamboowe, by 1,523 votes.

In 1959 he was appointed as the Parliamentary Secretary to Minister of Industries and Fisheries in the S. W. R. D. Bandaranaike cabinet. In December 1959 he joined Lanka Prajathanthravadi Pakshaya (Ceylon Democratic Party), formed by Dr. Wijeyananda Dahanayake. In January 1960 when the Prime Minister Wijeyananda Dahanayake sacked his cabinet, Weerasekera was appointed Minister of Industries and Fisheries in his caretaker government. At the March 1960 elections to the fourth Parliament, Weerasekera contested the newly created seat of Kotmale as a candidate of the Lanka Prajathanthravadi Pakshaya, winning the seat by 919 votes (securing 35% of the total vote). He was one of only four members of the party to be elected to parliament. Prior to the subsequent July 1960 elections he rejoined the Sri Lanka Freedom Party and was successful in retaining the seat, winning by a margin of 2,172 votes (securing 57.5% of the total vote). On 5 August 1960 he was appointed as the chief government whip, a position he held until 25 September 1963. At the 1965 elections he was defeated by the United National Party candidate, D. B. Ranatunga, by 1,957 votes. He regained the seat at the 1970 parliamentary elections but did not contest the 7th parliamentary election, held on 21 July 1977.

Weerasekera married Zita Millicent Amaratunge (?-2015) and they had three children: Nilanthie, Tissa and Kanthie. He died in 2011.
