= G. R. Motha =

Ceylonese politician, lawyer and Tamil activist

George Rosario Motha (22 November 1892 – 1950) was a Ceylonese politician, lawyer and Tamil activist.

Motha was elected to the first Parliament of Ceylon in 1947 representing the Ceylon Indian Congress as the member for the Maskeliya electorate. He was strongly opposed to Ceylon Citizenship Act No 18 of 1948, whereby Indian Tamils were legally denied Ceylon citizenship, speaking and voting against the Act. Motha stating in parliament that not only would many Indian Tamils be unable to prove their paternal genealogy but also the Sinhalese community would be automatically recognised effectively discriminating against the Indian Tamil population.

Motha died in 1950 and his seat representing the Maskeliya electorate was filled by Abdul Aziz, following a by-election in March 1950.
