= V. P. Ganesan =

Sri Lankan politician

- வி. பி. கணேசன்
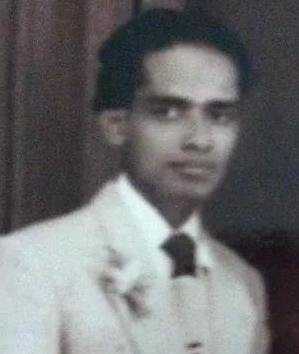
- V. P. Ganesan
- Born: Sri Lanka
- Died: 2 August 1996; Sri Lanka
- Known for: Trade unionism, filmmaking
- Spouse: Diana Ruth Thavamani
- Children: Mano, Baskaran, Gowri, Praba, Prakash

Vythilingam Palanisamy Ganesan (known as V. P. Ganesan) was a Sri Lankan trade unionist, politician, film producer and actor.

== Biography ==
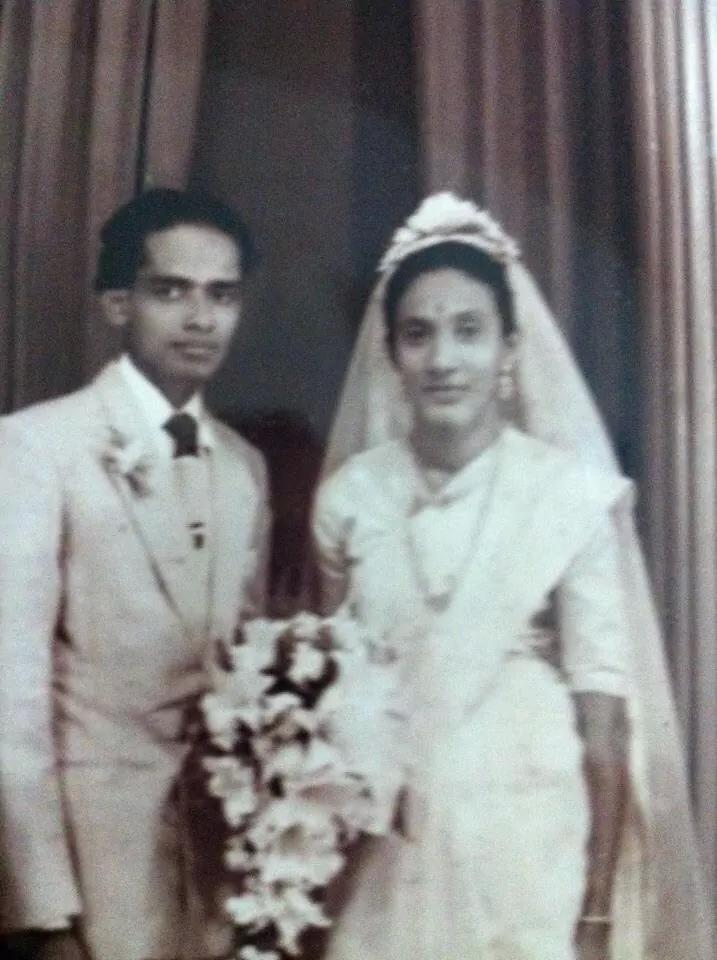
V. P. Ganesan and wife Diana Ruth Ganesan are seen at their wedding day.

Ganeshan was the president of the trade union, Democratic Workers Congress and father of Mano, a Sri Lankan Minister and human rights defender, Praba, a former Member of Parliament, Gowri, a solicitor, Baskaran and Prakash, prominent industrialists in the hotel trade.

He produced and acted in the lead roles in three movies, Pudhiya Kattru, Naan Ungal Thozhan and Naadu Pottra Vaazhgha. As of now, he remains the only film producer to make three Tamil films in Sri Lanka and all of them were reasonable successes.

== See also ==
- List of political families in Sri Lanka
