= Maskeliya Electoral District =

Electoral district in Sri Lanka

Maskeliya electoral district was an electoral district of Sri Lanka between August 1947 and July 1977. The district was named after the town of Maskeliya in Nuwara Eliya District, Central Province. The 1978 Constitution of Sri Lanka introduced the proportional representation electoral system for electing members of Parliament. The existing 160 mainly single-member electoral districts were replaced with 22 multi-member electoral districts. Maskeliya electoral district was replaced by the Nuwara Eliya multi-member electoral district at the 1989 general elections, the first under the proportional representation system.

== Members of Parliament ==
Key

Ceylon Indian Congress UNP SLFP

| Election | Member | Party | Term |
|---|---|---|---|
| 1947 | G. R. Motha | Ceylon Indian Congress | 1947-1950 |
| 1950 by-election | Abdul Aziz | Ceylon Indian Congress | 1950-1952 |
| 1952 | P. H. C. Silva | United National Party | 1952-1956 |
| 1956 | S. Jinadasa | Sri Lanka Freedom Party | 1956-1960 |
| 1960 (March) | Donald J. Ranaweera | United National Party | 1960 |
| 1960 (July) | Edmund Wijesuriya | Sri Lanka Freedom Party | 1960-1970 |
| 1965 | Edmund Wijesuriya | United National Party | 1960-1970 |
| 1970 | P. Gamini Ariyatilake | Sri Lanka Freedom Party | 1970-1976 |

== Elections ==
=== 1947 Parliamentary General Election ===
Results of the 1st parliamentary election held between 23 August 1947 and 20 September 1947:

| Candidate | Party | Symbol | Votes | % |
|---|---|---|---|---|
| G. R. Motha | Ceylon Indian Congress | Spectacles | 9,086 | 60.09 |
| B. D. W. Gunapala | Independent | House | 3,949 | 26.12 |
| K. Natesa Aiyar | Independent | Umbrella | 918 | 6.07 |
| T. M. Soloman | Lanka Sama Samaja Party | Hand | 598 | 3.96 |
| Valid Votes | | | 14,551 | 96.24 |
| Rejected Votes | | | 569 | 3.76 |
| Total Polled | | | 15,120 | 100.00 |
| Registered Electors | | | 24,427 | |
| Turnout | | | | 61.90 |

=== 1950 Parliamentary By-Election ===
Results of the parliamentary by-election held on 11 March 1950:

| Candidate | Party | Symbol | Votes | % |
|---|---|---|---|---|
| Abdul Aziz | Ceylon Indian Congress | Hand | 11,343 | 87.65 |
| G. R. Rajapreyar | | Cartwheel | 1,301 | 10.05 |
| Valid Votes | | | 12,664 | 97.85 |
| Rejected Votes | | | 278 | 2.15 |
| Total Polled | | | 12,942 | 100.00 |
| Registered Electors | | | 24,427 | |
| Turnout | | | | 52.98 |

=== 1952 Parliamentary General Election ===
Results of the 2nd parliamentary election held between 24 May 1952 and 30 May 1952:

| Candidate | Party | Symbol | Votes | % |
|---|---|---|---|---|
| P. H. C. Silva | United National Party | House | 3,415 | 59.37 |
| Chandrapala Gunasekera | Lanka Sama Samaja Party | Umbrella | 956 | 16.62 |
| B. D. W. Gunapala | Ceylon Labour Party | Elephant | 837 | 14.55 |
| R. Bandara Gannewa | Independent | Star | 360 | 6.26 |
| H. P. Caldera | Sri Lanka Freedom Party | Hand | 112 | 1.95 |
| Valid Votes | | | 5,680 | 98.75 |
| Rejected Votes | | | 72 | 1.25 |
| Total Polled | | | 5,752 | 100.00 |
| Registered Electors | | | 8,703 | |
| Turnout | | | | 66.09 |

=== 1956 Parliamentary General Election ===
Results of the 3rd parliamentary election held between 5 April 1956 and 10 April 1956:

| Candidate | Party | Symbol | Votes | % |
|---|---|---|---|---|
| S. Jinadasa | Sri Lanka Freedom Party | Hand | 3,228 | 45.91 |
| P. H. C. Silva | United National Party | Elephant | 3,014 | 42.87 |
| Ananda Premasinghe | | Key | 738 | 10.50 |
| Valid Votes | | | 6,980 | 99.27 |
| Rejected Votes | | | 51 | 0.73 |
| Total Polled | | | 7,031 | 100.00 |
| Registered Electors | | | 9,461 | |
| Turnout | | | | 74.32 |

=== 1960 (March) Parliamentary General Election ===
Results of the 4th parliamentary election held on 19 March 1960:

| Candidate | Party | Symbol | Votes | % |
|---|---|---|---|---|
| Donald J. Ranaweera | United National Party | Elephant | 4,192 | 34.74 |
| S. Jinadasa | Mahajana Eksath Peramuna | Cartwheel | 3,031 | 25.12 |
| P. Gamini Ariyatilake | Lanka Sama Samaja Party | Key | 2,256 | 18.69 |
| V. K. Vellayan | | Tree | 1,349 | 11.18 |
| R. B. Gannewa | Sri Lanka Freedom Party | Hand | 631 | 5.23 |
| Effie Jayatillake | | Umbrella | 194 | 1.61 |
| Yakandawala L. Senanayake | | Star | 121 | 1.00 |
| Piyadasa Welhena | | Sun | 116 | 0.96 |
| P.P. Pillai | | Scales | 56 | 0.46 |
| Valid Votes | | | 11,969 | 99.18 |
| Rejected Votes | | | 99 | 0.82 |
| Total Polled | | | 12,068 | 100.00 |
| Registered Electors | | | 15,450 | |
| Turnout | | | | 78.11 |

=== 1960 (July) Parliamentary General Election ===
Results of the 5th parliamentary election held on 20 July 1960:

| Candidate | Party | Symbol | Votes | % |
|---|---|---|---|---|
| Edmund Wijesuriya | Sri Lanka Freedom Party | Hand | 6,378 | 54.03 |
| D. J. Ranaweera | United National Party | Elephant | 5,263 | 44.59 |
| N. P. Banda | | Cartwheel | 91 | 0.77 |
| Valid Votes | | | 11,732 | 99.39 |
| Rejected Votes | | | 72 | 0.61 |
| Total Polled | | | 11,804 | 100.00 |
| Registered Electors | | | 15,450 | |
| Turnout | | | | 76.40 |

=== 1965 Parliamentary General Election ===
Results of the 6th parliamentary election held on 22 March 1965:

| Candidate | Party | Symbol | Votes | % |
|---|---|---|---|---|
| Edmund Wijesuriya | United National Party | Elephant | 11,024 | 56.85 |
| P. Gamini Ariyatilake | Sri Lanka Freedom Party | Hand | 7,851 | 40.49 |
| D. B. Rajapaksa | | Butterfly | 233 | 1.20 |
| Valid Votes | | | 19,108 | 98.54 |
| Rejected Votes | | | 284 | 1.46 |
| Total Polled | | | 19,392 | 100.00 |
| Registered Electors | | | 22,808 | |
| Turnout | | | | 85.02 |

=== 1970 Parliamentary General Election ===
Results of the 7th parliamentary election held on 27 May 1970:

| Candidate | Party | Symbol | Votes | % |
|---|---|---|---|---|
| P. Gamini Ariyatilake | Sri Lanka Freedom Party | Hand | 10,783 | 45.75 |
| Edmund Wijesuriya | United National Party | Elephant | 10,087 | 42.50 |
| V. K. Vellaiyen | | Umbrella | 1,412 | 5.95 |
| D. J. Ranaweera | | Butterfly | 1,289 | 5.43 |
| Valid Votes | | | 23,571 | 99.31 |
| Rejected Votes | | | 163 | 0.69 |
| Total Polled | | | 23,734 | 100.00 |
| Registered Electors | | | 27,945 | |
| Turnout | | | | 84.93 |
