= P. P. Sumanatilake =

Ceylonese politician

Piyadigamage Premachandra Sumanatilake (?–1967) was a Ceylonese politician.

Sumanatilake was elected to parliament at the 2nd parliamentary election, held between 24 May 1952 and 30 May 1952, successfully contested the Nuwara Eliya electorate as the United National Party candidate. He polled 3,852 votes (64% of the total vote), over 3,000 votes ahead of his nearest rival.

He was unable to retain the seat at the 3rd parliamentary election, held between 5 April 1956 and 10 April 1956, losing to the Sri Lanka Freedom Party candidate, Andrew Dissanayake, by over 1,000 votes.

He was a member of the first Council of the incorporated Law Society of Ceylon.

P. Saliya Sumanatilake is his grandson.
