= Edmund Wijesuriya =

Sri Lankan politician (1919–2006)

Hon. Edmund Wijesuriya

Member of the Ceylonese Parliament for Maskeliya
- In office 1960–1970
- Preceded by: Donald J. Ranaweera
- Succeeded by: P. Gamini Ariyatilake

Personal details
- Born: 21 June 1919
- Died: 3 October 2006 (aged 87)
- Party: United National Party
- Other political affiliations: Sri Lanka Freedom Party

Henry Edmund Wijesuriya (21 June 1919 – 3 October 2006) was a Sri Lankan politician who was a Member of Parliament from Maskeliya, and President of the All Ceylon Co-operative Federation.

Wijesuriya was elected from the Maskeliya electorate from the Sri Lanka Freedom Party (SLFP) in the 1960 July general election defeating the incumbent Donald J. Ranaweera from the Mahajana Eksath Peramuna. He was one of thirteen SLFP parliamentarians who crossed over to the opposition with C. P. de Silva on 3 December 1964 resulting in the defeat of the SLFP government under Sirima Bandaranaike. He contested the 1965 general election from the United National Party and won, but lost his seat in the 1970 general election.

Wijesuriya died on 3 October 2006, at the age of 87.
