= Kotmale Electoral District =

Electoral district of Sri Lanka

Kotmale electoral district was an electoral district of Sri Lanka between March 1960 and February 1989. The district was named after the town of Kotmale in Nuwara Eliya District, Central Province. The 1978 Constitution of Sri Lanka introduced the proportional representation electoral system for electing members of Parliament. The existing 160 mainly single-member electoral districts were replaced with 22 multi-member electoral districts. Kotmale electoral district was replaced by the Nuwara Eliya multi-member electoral district at the 1989 general elections.

== Members of Parliament ==
Key

Independent SLFP UNP

Election	Member	Party	Term
1960 (March)	J. D. Weerasekera	Lanka Prajathanthravadi Pakshaya	1960
1960 (July)	J. D. Weerasekera	Sri Lanka Freedom Party	1960–1965
1965	D. B. Ranatunga	United National Party	1965–1970
1970	J. D. Weerasekera	Sri Lanka Freedom Party	1970–1977
1977	Ananda Dassanayake	Sri Lanka Freedom Party	1977–1989

== Elections ==
=== 1960 (March) Parliamentary General Election ===
Results of the 4th parliamentary election held on 19 March 1960:

Candidate	Party	Symbol	Votes	%
J. D. Weerasekera	Lanka Prajathanthravadi Pakshaya	Umbrella	4,643	35.04
R. M. Dingiri Banda Ranatunga	United National Party	Elephant	3,724	28.11
A. Dissanayake	Sri Lanka Freedom Party	Hand	3,449	26.03
J. M. Heen Banda	Lanka Sama Samaja Party	Key	691	5.22
K. M. Bandara		Clock	524	3.96
Valid Votes			13,031	98.35
Rejected Votes			219	1.65
Total Polled			13,250	100.00
Registered Electors			16,831	
Turnout				78.72

=== 1960 (July) Parliamentary General Election ===
Results of the 5th parliamentary election held on 20 July 1960:

Candidate	Party	Symbol	Votes	%
J. D. Weerasekera	Sri Lanka Freedom Party	Hand	7,859	57.51
D. B. Ranatunga	United National Party	Elephant	5,687	41.62
Valid Votes			13,546	99.13
Rejected Votes			119	0.87
Total Polled			13,665	100.00
Registered Electors			16,831	
Turnout				81.19

=== 1965 Parliamentary General Election ===
Results of the 6th parliamentary election held on 22 March 1965:

Candidate	Party	Symbol	Votes	%
D. B. Ranatunga	United National Party	Elephant	10,564	54.05
J. D. Weerasekera	Sri Lanka Freedom Party	Hand	8,607	44.04
M. S. Egodawela		Sun	127	0.65
Valid Votes			19,298	98.74
Rejected Votes			247	1.26
Total Polled			19,545	100.00
Registered Electors			22,876	
Turnout				85.44

=== 1970 Parliamentary General Election ===
Results of the 7th parliamentary election held on 27 May 1970:

Candidate	Party	Symbol	Votes	%
J. D. Weerasekera	Sri Lanka Freedom Party	Hand	11,936	51.76
D. B. Ranatunga	United National Party	Elephant	10,768	46.69
O. M. Wijewardhana	Janatha Vimukthi Peramuna	Bell	235	1.02
Valid Votes			22,939	99.47
Rejected Votes			122	0.53
Total Polled			23,061	100.00
Registered Electors			25,953	
Turnout				88.86

=== 1977 Parliamentary General Election ===
Results of the 7th parliamentary election held on 21 July 1977:

Candidate	Party	Symbol	Votes	%
Ananda Dassanayake	Sri Lanka Freedom Party	Hand	11,505	42.36
D. B. Samaratunga	United National Party	Elephant	7,640	28.13
Wijesundare Bandara Ranatunge		Umbrella	7,536	27.75
G. Rajagopal		Tree	113	0.42
W. B. Ranatunge		Lamp	99	0.37
P. Kandiah		Eye	67	0.25
O. M. Wijayawardena		Cartwheel	59	0.22
Valid Votes			27,019	99.49
Rejected Votes			139	0.51
Total Polled			27,158	100.00
Registered Electors			30,743	
Turnout				88.34
