= Srima Dissanayake =

Sri Lankan politician and lawyer (1943–2019)

- ශ්‍රීමා දිසානායක

Personal details
- Born: 7 January 1943
- Died: 29 March 2019 (aged 76) Colombo, Sri Lanka
- Party: United National Party
- Spouse: Gamini Dissanayake
- Children: Navin Dissanayake, Mayantha Dissanayake, Varuni Dissanayake
- Education: Ceylon Law College
- Occupation: Lawyer

Wajira Srimathi Dissanayake (Sinhala: වජිර ශ්‍රීමති දිසානායක, romanized: Wajira Srīmati Disānāyaka; 7 January 1943 – 29 March 2019) was a Sri Lankan lawyer and politician. She was the candidate of the United National Party in 1994 Sri Lankan presidential election.

== Early life and family ==
Dissanayake was born in 1943. (Note: Another source gives Dissanayake's year of birth as 1941.) She was the daughter of Piyasena Lenaduwa from Galle in southern Ceylon. She was educated at Ladies' College, Colombo.

After school, Dissanayake joined Ceylon Law College, where she met her future husband Gamini Dissanayake. The couple had two sons, Navin and Mayantha, both of whom had served as Members of Parliament, and one daughter, Varuni.

== Career ==
Dissanayake was a lawyer by profession and was a member of the Central Provincial Council. Her husband, who was the Leader of the Opposition, was chosen by the United National Party to be its candidate at the 1994 presidential election. However, he was killed in a suicide bombing on 24 October 1994, sixteen days before the election. The UNP, hoping to capitalise on the sympathy vote, chose Srima Dissanayake over former prime minister Ranil Wickremesinghe and former first lady Hema Premadasa to be Gamini Dissanayake's replacement. However, many UNP officials refused to campaign for Srima Dissanayake who, for security reasons, campaigned through the media only.

Dissanayake was soundly defeated by prime minister Chandrika Kumaratunga who swept the polls, with Kumaratunga winning in all but one of the 160 polling divisions. Dissanayake received 2,715,283 votes (35.91%), the lowest share for a major party candidate in any Sri Lankan presidential election. Following the election, Dissanayake left politics and devoted herself to her family, the Gamini Dissanayake Foundation and the Gamini Dissanayake Institute of Technology and Vocational Studies.

== Death ==
Dissanayake died at a private hospital in Colombo on 29 March 2019.

== See also ==
- List of political families in Sri Lanka
