= T. William Fernando =

Sri Lankan politician

Thanthulage William Fernando was a Sri Lankan politician. He served as the Member of Parliament for Nuwara Eliya (1960 to 1965) and Mayor of Nuwara Eliya.
