= Democratic People's Front =

Democratic People's Front ஜனநாயக மக்கள் முன்னணி ප්රජාතන්ත්රවාදී ජනතා පෙරමුණේ
- Leader: Mano Ganesan
- Secretary-General: M.Paraneetharan
- Founded: 2000
- Preceded by: Western People's Front
- Headquarters: 72 Bankshall Street, Colombo 11
- National affiliation: Samagi Jana Balawegaya
- Regional affiliation: Tamil Progressive Alliance
- Parliament of Sri Lanka: 1 / 225
- Local Government: 09 / 7,842

Election symbol
- Ladder

The Western People's Front, currently named the Democratic People's Front (Tamil: ஜனநாயக மக்கள் முன்னணி, romanized: Jaṉanāyaka Makkaḷ Muṉṉaṇi; Sinhala: ප්රජාතන්ත්රවාදී ජනතා පෙරමුණේ Prajathanthravadi Janatha Peramunay), is a political party in Sri Lanka active in the Western Province.

The WPF was originally founded as a trade union, which then became a political party under the leadership of Mano Ganesan. It draws most of its support from the Tamil population of Colombo.
