= Mano Ganesan =

Sri Lankan politician

Hon. Mano Ganesan MP
- மனோ கணேசன் මනෝ ගනේසන්
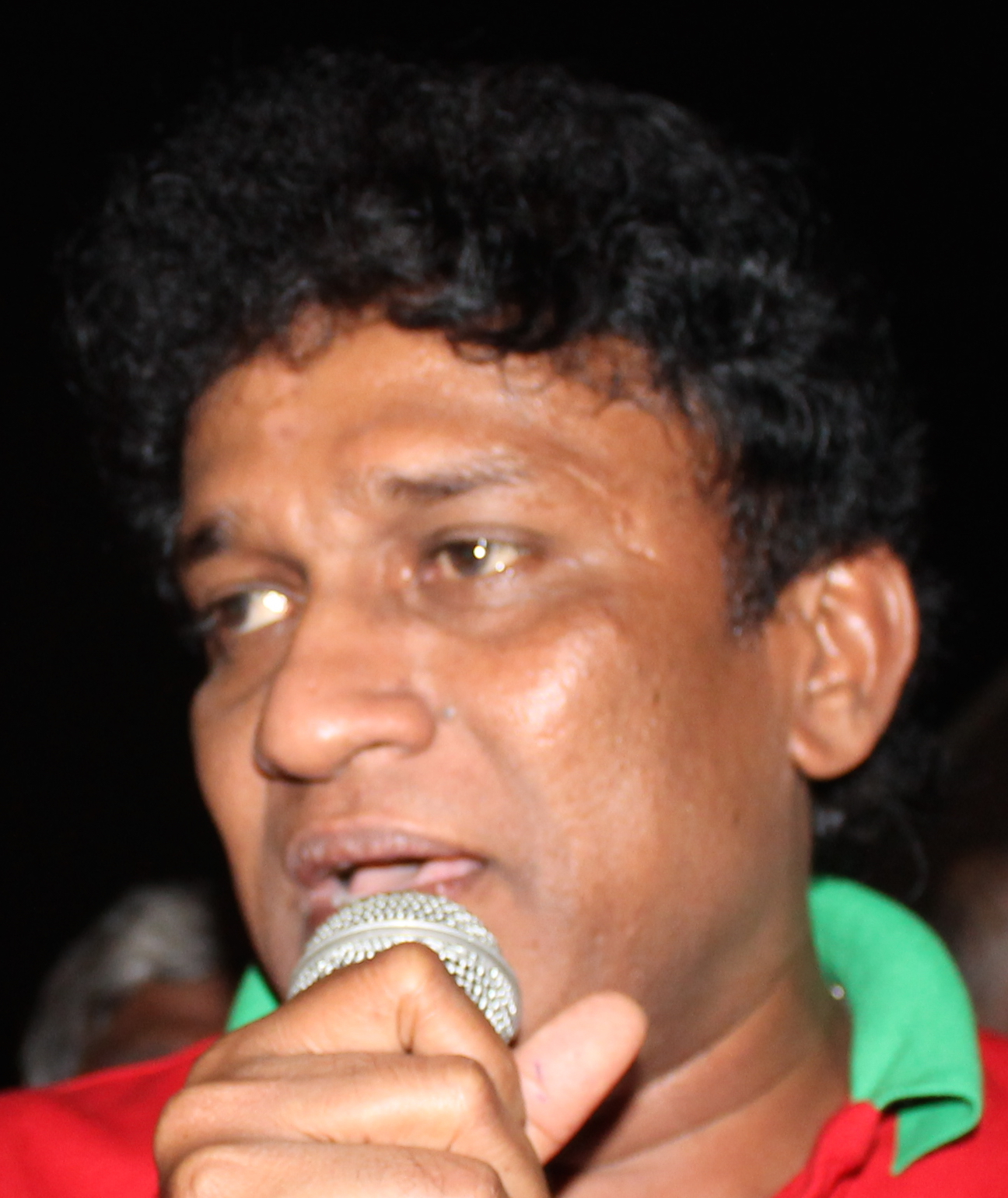

Minister of National Integration, Reconciliation and Official Languages
- In office 4 September 2015 – 21 November 2019
- President: Maithripala Sirisena
- Prime Minister: Ranil Wickremesinghe
- Preceded by: Vasudeva Nanayakkara
- Succeeded by: Office abolished

Member of Parliament for Colombo District
- In office 2015–2024
- In office 2001–2010

Member of the Western Provincial Council for Colombo District
- In office 2014–2015
- In office 1999–2001

Member of Colombo Municipal Council
- In office 2011–2014

Personal details
- Born: 17 December 1959 (age 66)
- Party: Democratic People's Front
- Other political affiliations: Tamil Progressive Alliance
- Occupation: Trade unionist

Akilan Manoharan Ganesan (born 17 December 1959) is a Sri Lankan trade unionist, politician and government minister. He is the leader of the Democratic People's Front (DPF) and Tamil Progressive Alliance (TPA), both constituent parties of the Samagi Jana Balawegaya.

== Early life ==
Ganesan was born on 17 December 1959. He is a son of V. P. Ganesan, trade unionist and film producer, and brother of Praba Ganesan, former Member of Parliament.

== Career ==
Ganesan is president of the Democratic Workers Congress trade union. He contested the 1999 provincial council election as one of the Indian Origin People's Front's candidates in Colombo District and was elected to the Western Provincial Council.

Ganesan founded the Western People's Front in 2000 to represent Tamils living in the greater Colombo region. He contested the 2001 parliamentary election as one of the United National Front's (UNF) candidates in Colombo District. He was elected and entered Parliament. He was re-elected at the 2004 parliamentary election.

Ganesan contested the 2010 parliamentary election as one of the UNF's candidates in Kandy District but failed to get re-elected after coming seventh amongst the UNF candidates. He contested the 2011 local government election as a Democratic People's Front (DPF) candidate and was elected to Colombo Municipal Council. He contested the 2014 provincial election as a DPF candidate and was re-elected to the Western Provincial Council.

Ganesan was one of the United National Front for Good Governance's candidates in Colombo District at the 2015 parliamentary election. He was elected and re-entered Parliament. He was sworn in as Minister of National Dialogue on 4 September 2015.

Ganesan is founder and convener of the Civil Monitoring Commission on Extra-Judicial Killings and Disappearance. He was the first runner-up in the 2007 Freedom Defender's Award.

He was appointed as a Member of Parliament for National List in 2024 Sri Lankan parliamentary election as a member of the Samagi Jana Balawegaya.

== Electoral history ==
Electoral history of Mano Ganesan
Election	Constituency	Party	Alliance	Votes	Result
1999 provincial	Colombo District	DWC	IOPF	3,663	Elected
2001 parliamentary	Colombo District	WPF	UNF	54,942	Elected
2004 parliamentary	Colombo District	WPF	UNF	51,508	Elected
2010 parliamentary	Kandy District	DPF	UNF	28,033	Not elected
2011 local	Colombo MC	DPF		28,433	Elected
2014 provincial	Colombo District	DPF		28,558	Elected
2015 parliamentary	Colombo District	DPF	UNFGG	69,064	Elected
2020 parliamentary	Colombo District	DPF	SJB	62,091	Elected
2024 parliamentary	Colombo District	DPF	SJB	19,013	Not elected

== See also ==
- List of political families in Sri Lanka
