= P. Gamini Ariyatilake =

Sri Lankan politician

Hon. P. G. Ariyatilake MP

Member of the Ceylonese Parliament for Maskeliya
- In office 1970–1977
- Preceded by: Edmund Wijesuriya

Personal details
- Born: Piyadigamage Gamini Ariyatilake; 26 May 1917
- Died: 13 March 1983 (aged 65)
- Party: Sri Lanka Freedom Party
- Spouse: Hemalatha Senanayake
- Children: Anura, Yamuna, Preethi, Deepthi, Sesha, Thusitha
- Education: Mahinda College, Galle; University of Colombo (Sri Palee), Horana

Piyadigamage Gamini Ariyatilake (26 May 1917 – 13 March 1983) was a Sri Lankan politician and member of parliament.

P. G. Ariyatilake was born on 26 May 1917 and was educated at Mahinda College in Galle before attending the University of Colombo at its Sri Palee campus in Horana. Between 1939 and 1943 he served as a public health inspector before joining the Madyama Lanka Bus Company in 1944. He was elected as a member of the Hatton-Dickoya Urban Council, serving as its chairman between 1961 and 1967.

Ariyatilake stood as the Sri Lanka Freedom Party's candidate in Maskeliya Electoral District at the March 1960 and 1965 parliamentary elections and was unsuccessful on both occasions. He ran again in the 1970 parliamentary election and this time was successful in gaining the seat, with a margin of 696 votes. In late 1976 Ariyatilake, together with a number of SLFP members of parliament, resigned from the party. Ariyatilake did not contest the 1977 parliamentary election.

Ariyatilake died on 13 March 1983 at the age of 65.
