= Nuwara Eliya-Maskeliya Electoral District =

Electoral district of Sri Lanka

Nuwara Eliya-Maskeliya electoral district was an electoral district of Sri Lanka between July 1977 and February 1989. The district was named after the city of Nuwara Eliya and town of Maskeliya in Nuwara Eliya District, Central Province. The 1978 Constitution of Sri Lanka introduced the proportional representation electoral system for electing members of Parliament. The existing 160 mainly single-member electoral districts were replaced with 22 multi-member electoral districts. Nuwara Eliya-Maskeliya electoral district was replaced by the multi-member electoral district at the 1989 general elections, the first under the proportional representation system.

== Members of Parliament ==
Key

Independent SLFP UNP

Election	Member	Party	Term
1977	Gamini Dissanayake	United National Party	1977-1989
1977	Anura Bandaranaike	Sri Lanka Freedom Party	1977-1989
1977	S. Thondaman	Ceylon Workers' Congress	1977-1989

== Elections ==
=== 1977 Parliamentary General Election ===
Results of the 8th parliamentary election held on 21 July May 1977:

Candidate	Party	Symbol	Votes	%
Gamini Dissanayake	UNP	Elephant	65,903	40.99
Anura Bandaranaike	SLFP	Hand	48,776	30.33
S. Thondaman	CWC	Cockerel	35,743	22.23
T. Ariyadurai		Ladder	3,026	1.88
P. Gamini Ariyatilleke		Star	2,949	1.83
Valid Votes			160,821	98.34
Rejected Votes			2,712	1.66
Total Polled			163,533	100.00
Registered Electors			164,407	
Turnout				99.47
