= Savumiamoorthy Thondaman =

Sri Lankan politician

Hon. Savumiamoorthy Thondaman

Leader of Ceylon Workers' Congress
- In office 1939–1999

Member of Parliament for Nuwara Eliya
- In office 1947–1952

Member of Parliament for Stateless Persons (Appointed)
- In office 1960–1970

Member of Parliament for Nuwara Eliya Maskeliya
- In office 21 July 1977 – 20 December 1988

Member of Parliament for National List
- In office 1989 – 30 October 1999

Personal details
- Born: 30 August 1913 M Pudhur, Madras State, India
- Died: 30 October 1999 (aged 86) Sri Jayewardenapura Hospital, Sri Jayewardenapura, Sri Lanka
- Party: Ceylon Workers' Congress
- Spouse: Kothai Thondaman
- Relations: Arumugam Thondaman
- Children: Ramanathan Thondaman
- Occupation: Trade unionist

Savumiamoorthy Thondaman (30 August 1913 – 30 October 1999; also spelled Saumyamurthy Thondaman or Saumiyamoorthy Thondaman) was a Sri Lankan politician who represented the Indian Tamils of Sri Lanka of which he was a member. At the time of his death, he was both the oldest and the seniormost member of the Sri Lankan Cabinet where he had served continuously for 21 years from 1978, under four Sri Lankan Presidents and the leader of the political party Ceylon Workers' Congress. He was succeeded by his grandson Arumugam Thondaman.

== See also ==
- List of members of the Sri Lankan Parliament who died in office
