= Ceylon Workers' Congress =

Political party in Sri Lanka

Ceylon Workers' Congress இலங்கை தொழிலாளர் காங்கிரஸ் ලංකා කම්කරු කොංග්‍රසය
- Leader: Senthil Thondaman
- Founder: Savumiamoorthy Thondaman
- Founded: 1939; 87 years ago
- Preceded by: Ceylon Indian Congress
- Headquarters: 72 Ananda Coomaraswamy Mawatha, Colombo 07
- Ideology: Agrarian socialism Indian Tamil interests
- National affiliation: People's Alliance (2004); United People's Freedom Alliance (2004–2019); Sri Lanka People's Freedom Alliance (2019–2022); New Democratic Front (since 2024)
- Colors: Red, green, white
- Parliament of Sri Lanka: 1 / 225
- Local Government: 54 / 7,842

Election symbol
- Cockerel

Party flag

The Ceylon Workers' Congress (CWC; Tamil: இலங்கை தொழிலாளர் காங்கிரஸ், romanized: Ilaṅkai Toḻilāḷar Kāṅkiras; Sinhala: ලංකා කම්කරු කොංග්‍රසය, romanized: Laṁkā Kamkaru Koṁgrasaya) is a political party in Sri Lanka that has traditionally represented Sri Lankan Tamils of Indian origin working in the plantation sector of the economy.

== History ==
The CWC was formed by Peri Sundaram and G. R. Motha as an Indian Estates Workers Trade Union in 1950. It was an outgrowth of the Ceylon Indian Congress (CIC), formed 15 July 1939. In 1950 the CIC changed its name to the Ceylon Workers Congress (CWC) and became the largest trade union in the country. Another trade union, the Democratic Workers Congress (DWC), was formed in 1956 as a breakaway faction of the CWC as a result of leadership rivalries between the president, S. Thondaman, and the general secretary A. Aziz. The former retained control of the CWC and was the dominant trade union leader of the Indian Tamil workers for nearly four decades. As president of the Ceylon Indian Congress, he contested the Nuwara Eliya seat at the 1947 general election and won. His party put forward eight candidates in the plantation electorates and seven of them were returned, they were Thondaman, S. M. Subbaiah (Badulla), G. R. Motha (Maskeliya), K. Rajalingam (Nawalapitiya), K. Kumaravelu (Kotagala), C. V. Velupillai (Talawakelle) and D. Ramanujam (Alutnuwara).

== Organisation ==
The political potentiality of the Indian Tamil workers and the CIC led by Thondaman were viewed as threats to the power of the ruling United National Party. Another view was that the enfranchisement of the Indian workers would interfere with the representation of the Kandyan Sinhalese in the legislature. However, the main reason for the disenfranchisement was the fear of political leaders like Senanayake (and even Ponnambalam) that the estate sector would become a prey to the Marxist movement. The left movement was militant and had a public image which concealed that its political strength was minuscule. However, the political leaders of the era had a more pessimistic prognosis.

Even though the Donoughmore Constitution had granted universal franchise to Ceylonese, this was not applied to the Indian Estate Tamils, due to opposition from caste-conscious Colombo Tamils, vote conscious Kandyan Sinhalese, as well as due to the general opposition to any form of universal franchise. The latter was named "mob rule" by Arunachalam Ponnambalam. Thus, even by 1939, only a fraction of the Hill-country Tamils had been granted the franchise. The fear of Marxist control of the estates, as well as the pressure of Kandyan politicians, led to attempts not to extend citizenship to the Indian Tamils of the newly independent nation, except under very stringent conditions. In effect, the Ceylon Citizenship Act of 1948 and the Indian and Pakistani Residents (Citizenship) Act No.3 of 1949 were passed by the Sri Lankan Parliament and simply reinforced the status quo of the harsher pre-Donoughmore era prior to Universal Franchise (see Sri Lanka Tamils (Indian origin) for more details of dis-enfranchisement).

Thondaman opposed those laws and argued that most of the Indians were permanent residents and were the sons and daughters of the soil as are the Sinhalese or the "Malabar Tamils". The Marxist politicians criticised the move as an act of capitalist-imperialist lackeys, while S.J.V. Chelvanayakam the criticised the government as a Sinhala extremist regime, and branded Ponnambalam a traitor.

Thondaman's political organization staged a non-violent satyagraha campaign against the implementation of citizenship laws and boycotted them for a period of time. Since 1952, the Indian Tamils could not elect any representative to the Parliament as their voting strength was drastically reduced.

Thondaman supported the Sri Lanka Freedom Party in the 1960 elections and, after the victory of this party, was appointed to the House of Representative as a nominated Member of Parliament. On 3 December 1964, Thondaman declined to vote on a motion connected with the Governor General's Throne Speech. This brought about the downfall of the SLFP government led by Sirimavo Bandaranaike.

In the March 1965 elections, Thondaman shifted to the UNP to protest against the terms of the Indo-Ceylon Agreement of October 1964. After the victory of the UNP in 1965, S. Thondaman and Veloo Annamalay was named as appointed Members of Parliament.

He was out of Parliament from 1970 to 1977 after the defeat of the UNP in the general election of 1970. During this period the CWC under his leadership gradually allied itself with the major Tamil political parties and subscribed to form the Tamil United Front (TUF). He was also elected a leader of the triumvirate leadership of this Tamil political organization.

In May 1975, the TUF stressed that its objective was the setting up of the separate free, secular, sovereign, socialist state of Tamil Eelam and renamed itself into Tamil United Liberation Front (TULF). Thondaman did not want to subscribe to this new separatist policy of the TULF and withdrew from it.

He shifted his loyalties towards the United National Party which came to power in 1977. He served on the select committee for the revision of the constitution in 1978. In September 1978, he was invited by President J. R. Jayawardhane to join the Cabinet, which he accepted after the Executive Council of the Ceylon Workers Congress decided to do so.

Since 1978, Thondaman has served as a Cabinet minister under Presidents J. R. Jayawardhane, R.Premadasa and since 1995 under president Chandrika Bandaranaike.

When he joined the UNP government, he explained that he owed his position to the CWC, and the CWC's policy was to get citizenship for the stateless and better working conditions for estate labour.

At the last legislative elections, held on 2 April 2004, the party was a minor partner in the UNP-dominated United National Front that won 37.8% of the popular vote and 82 out of 225 seats.
