= Indian Tamils of Sri Lanka =

Tamil people of Indian origin in Sri Lanka

மலையகத் தமிழர் ශ්‍රී ලංකාවේ ඉන්දියානු දෙමළ ජනතාව
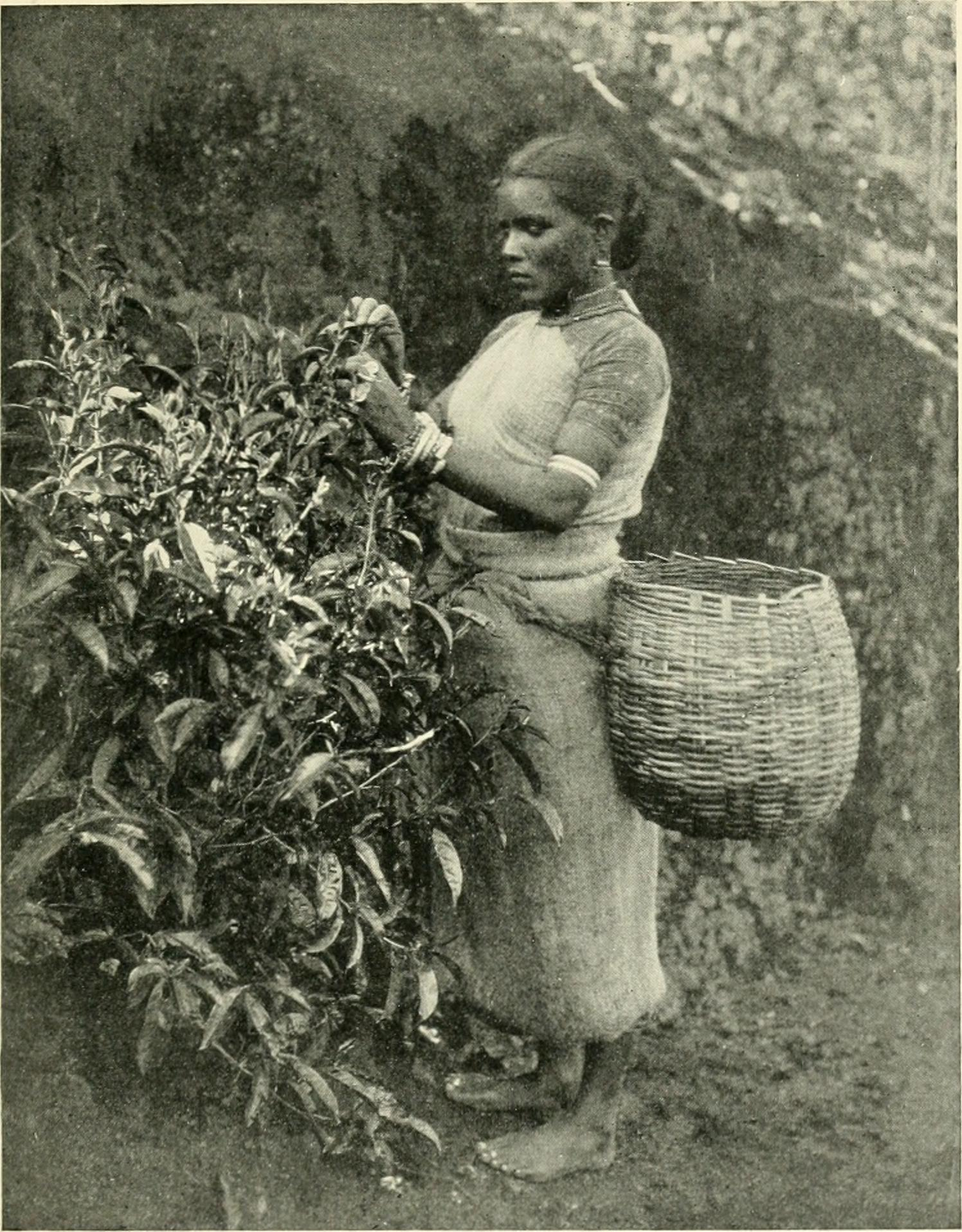
- Indian Tamil woman working in a tea plantation in central Sri Lanka, ca. 1907.

Total population
- 842,323 (4.2% of the Sri Lankan population) (2012)

Regions with significant populations
- Province
- Central: 484,429
- Uva: 154,252
- Sabaragamuwa: 104,063
- Western: 61,826

Languages
- Tamil (L1); Sinhala (L2)

Religion
- Majority; Hinduism; Minority: Christianity; Islam; Buddhism

Related ethnic groups
- Tamils; Sri Lankan Tamils; Tamil Malaysian; Singapore Tamils; Myanmar Tamils; Tamil South Africans; Tamil Mauritians; Other Dravidians

Indian Tamils of Sri Lanka (Note: Also known as Malayaga Tamilar, Hill Country Tamils, Up-Country Tamils or simply Indian Tamils.) are Tamils of Indian origin in Sri Lanka. They predominantly descend from workers sent during the British Raj from Southern India to Sri Lanka in the 19th and 20th centuries to work in coffee, tea and rubber plantations. Some also migrated on their own as merchants and as other service providers.

These Tamil speakers mostly live in the central highlands, also known as the Malayakam or Hill Country, yet others are also found in major urban areas and in the Northern Province. Although they are all termed as Tamils today, some have Telugu and Malayalee origins as well as diverse South Indian caste origins. They are instrumental in the plantation sector economy of Sri Lanka. In general, socio-economically their standard of living is below that of the national average and they are described as one of the poorest and most neglected groups in Sri Lanka. In 1964 a large percentage were repatriated to India, but left a considerable number as stateless people. By the 1990s most of these had been given Sri Lankan citizenship. Most are Hindus with a minority of Christians and Muslims amongst them. There are also a small minority followers of Buddhism among them. Politically they are supportive of trade union-based political parties that have supported most of the ruling coalitions since the 1980s.

The Tamils in Sri Lanka can be divided into two groups, the Sri Lankan Tamils, who are native to the island of Sri Lanka and the Indian Tamils or Hill Country Tamils, who are descendants of bonded labourers sent from Tamil Nadu to Sri Lanka in the 19th century to work in tea plantations. Many came as laborers to work in the plantations, but few of them came as business people. Most of the recruits came as they were recruited by the head man in their villages, mostly by high caste Tamils.

Sri Lankan Tamils mostly live in the Northern and Eastern Provinces and in the capital of Colombo, whereas Hill Country Tamils largely live in the central highlands. The Hill Country Tamils and Ceylon Tamils historically have seen themselves as separate communities, particularly due to the nativity of the island, and due to caste level differences as well. In 1949, the United National Party (UNP) government stripped the Indian Tamils of their nationality, including their right to vote. Prominent Tamil political leaders such as S. J. V. Chelvanayakam and his Tamil opposition party opposed this move.

Under an agreement between the Sri Lankan and Indian governments in the 1960s, around 40% of Hill Country Tamils were granted Sri Lankan nationality and many of the remainder were repatriated to India. However, the ethnic conflict has led to the growth of a greater sense of common Tamil identity, and the two groups became more supportive of each other. By the 1990s most Indian Tamils had received Sri Lankan citizenship, although some were not granted Sri Lankan citizenship until 2003, during the peace talks between the Tamil Tigers and the Sri Lankan government.

== History ==
=== Initial recruitment ===
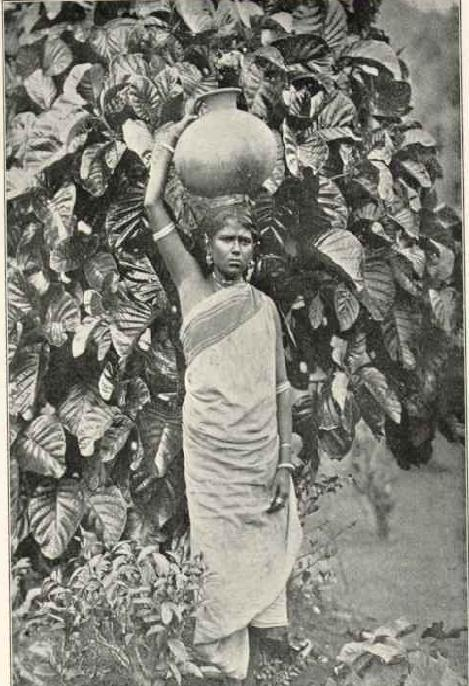
Indian Tamil worker at a tea plantation in Ceylon, The National Geographic Magazine, April 1907

The Hill Country Tamils derive their origins from a British colonial era project. According to Professor Bertram Bastianpillai, workers around the Tamil Nadu cities of Thirunelveli, Tiruchi, Madurai and Tanjore were recruited in 1827 by Governor Sir Edward Barnes on the request of George Bird, a pioneering planter. There is also a trading community of Indian Tamils who were not part of the plantation economy. As soon as these migrant workers were brought to Mannar, the port at which they landed on their arrival by boat from South India, they were moved via Kurunegala to camps in the town of Matale. There they were quarantined for a period of a week or more, examined for infectious diseases such as small pox, cholera or typhoid and vaccinated against those diseases before they were sent to Kandy, from where they were dispersed to locations where they would either work on estates already established by a previous gang of workers or clear land to establish new ones. Many died during their first few months of employment. They were instrumental in the establishment of tea, rubber, coffee and coconut plantations. They formed the bulk of the labour force of the plantation sector.

==== Community development ====
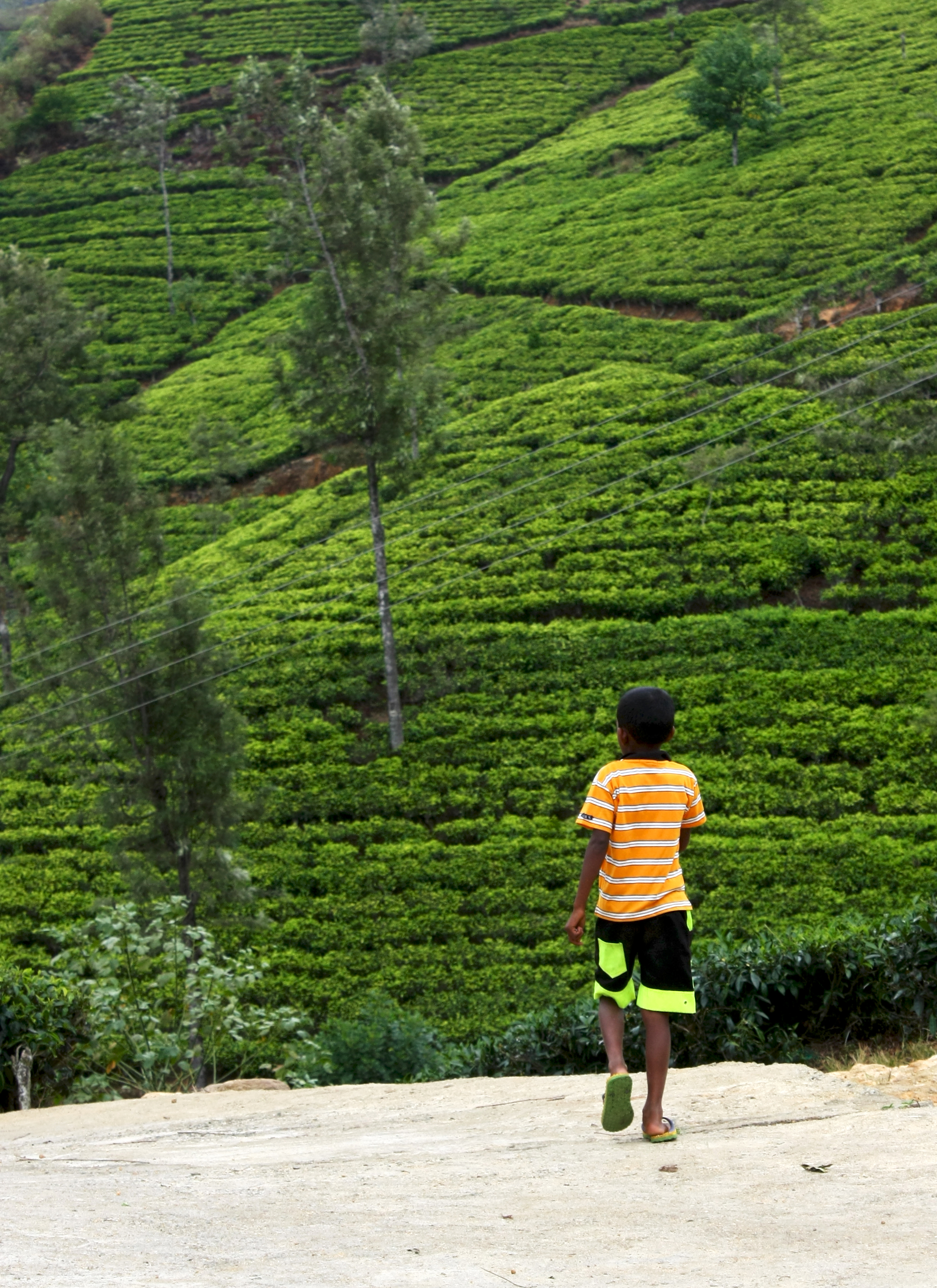
A boy goes out from home through a newly paved concrete road near a tea plantation in Walapane.

The community was a closed community confining themselves to the plantations, while actively contributing to the economic well-being of Sri Lanka. However, the socio-economic indicators of the community were among the worst in the country. The community in general was isolated, living in ghettos within the central region as well as linguistically isolated from the majority Sinhalese villagers who live in the valleys. They were captive labour whose entire life was decided by their employers. Any social relationships or cultural ties were only among themselves or with South India. In the 1940s the trade union movement had galvanized the plantation workers into a militant working class. They joined hands with the Lanka Sama Samaja (or Trotskyist) Party, which carried the message of a working-class struggle for liberation from the exploitation by the mainly-British plantation companies.

Sri Lanka became independent in 1948 and the community believes that it became the first community marked out for discrimination by the new state of Ceylon in 1948. In the elections to the first parliament of Ceylon, seven Indian Tamil representatives were returned to Parliament. The plantation workers voted either for Indian Tamil candidates or for Lanka Sama Samaja Party candidates. Dr. N.M. Perera was the leader of the opposition in the first parliament and the Lanka Sama Samaja Party was the second largest party after the United National Party (UNP).

=== Disenfranchisement ===
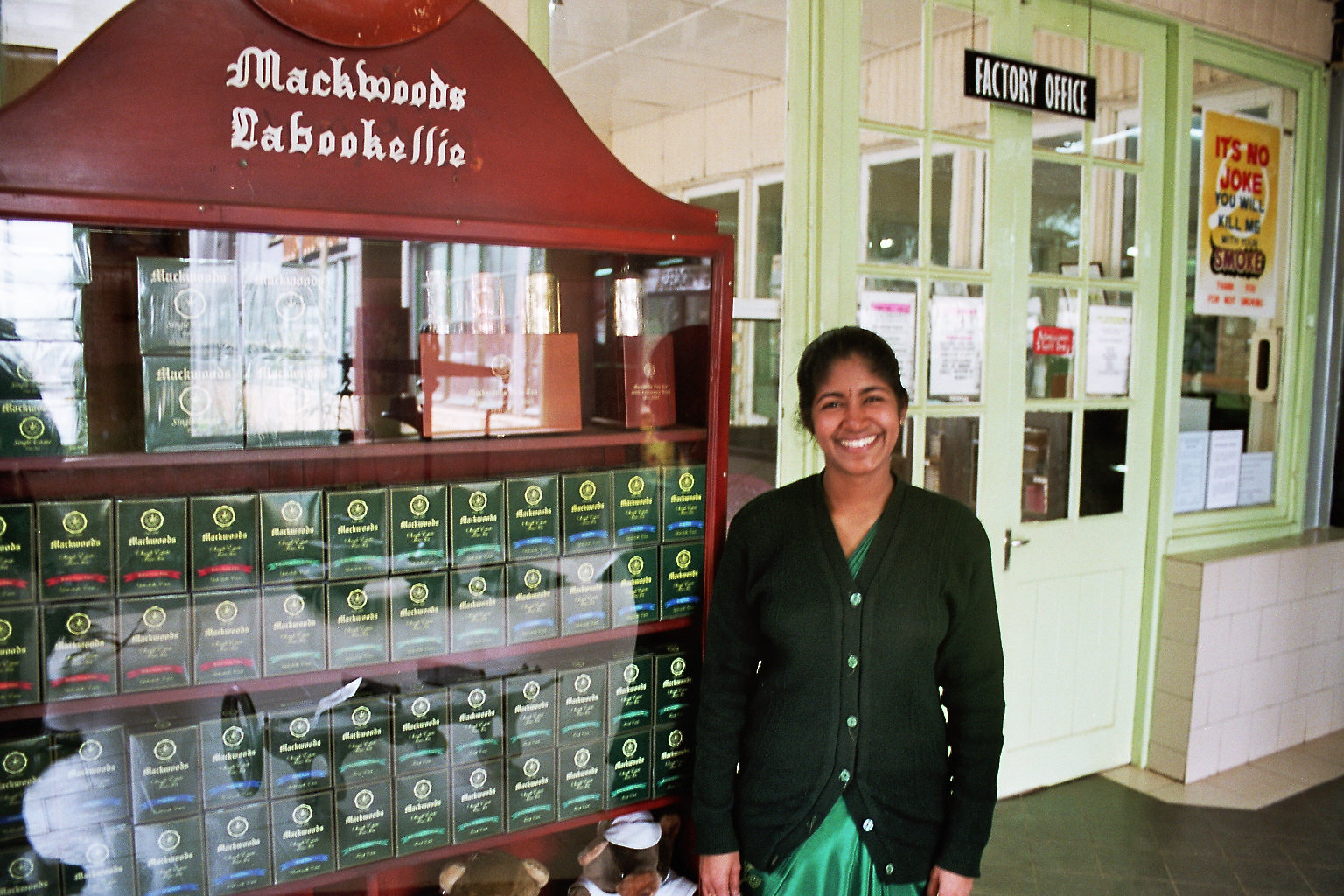
Tea is one of the highest earners of GNP of Sri Lanka.

The first prime minister, D.S. Senanayake of the conservative UNP, reacting to the possibilities of losing power to leftist political parties, commenced the task of weakening the leftist parties and their associate organizations. Indian Tamil labour had overwhelmingly supported these organizations. According to opposition parties he was also influenced by segments of the majority Sinhalese population who felt their voting strength was diluted due to Indian Tamils. He introduced the Ceylon Citizenship Act of 1948, the Indian-Pakistani Citizenship Act of 1949 and amended the Parliamentary Elections Act and disfranchised the Indian Tamils along with many persons of Indian and Pakistani ancestry. As they had no means of electing anyone to the Parliament they ceased to be a concern of parliamentary politicians. The plantation workers were thus forgotten from 1948 to 1964. They were unable to profit by any progressive legislation. The housing, health and education of the plantation workers was neglected. Infant mortality was highest in the country. Although since the introduction of universal franchise in 1931, strong traditions of social welfare in Sri Lanka have given the island very high indicators of physical well-being. Impressive national statistics tended to hide the existence of deprived pockets within the population and the most deprived population group has been the plantation labour, which had been economically, politically and socially deprived.

==== Donoughmore Commission ====
The Donoughmore Commission of 1928 recommended universal franchise, and this was also meant to include the plantation workers as well. Page 57 of the report proposed:

In the first place we consider it very desirable that a qualification of five years residence in the Island (allowing the temporary absence not exceeding eight months in all during the five years period) should be introduced in order that the privilege of voting should be confined to those who have an abiding interest in the country or who may be regarded as permanently settled in the Island... this condition will be of particular importance in its application to the Indian immigrant population. Secondly, we consider that the registration of voters should not be compulsory or automatic but should be restricted to those who apply for it.

However, the very concept of universal franchise was anathema to most of the political leaders of that era. Ponnambalam Ramanathan, a highly respected leader, opposed universal franchise as he felt that the caste system was an integral part of the Hindu way of life, and led a delegation to London seeking to legally enshrine the caste hierarchy, and dethrone universal franchise. The Kandyan Sinhalese also objected to the enfranchisement of the Indian estate workers as they feared that their electoral base would be diluted by a large influx of Indian Tamil votes. They also argued that the tea estates were built on land confiscated by the British colonial government, and that the Kandyan peasants had been driven from their traditional lands and those injustices would be compounded if the Indian workers were legitimized. Governor Stanley, by an order in council introduced restrictions on the citizenship of Indian workers to make the Donoughmore proposals acceptable to the Ceylonese leaders. Thus the first state council of 1931, which consisted of many Tamil and Sinhalese members, agreed not to enfranchise the majority of the Indian estate workers.

==== Soulbury Commission ====
A decade later, the Soulbury Commission, which paved the way for the independence of Ceylon recognized the "anxieties arising out of the likelihood of large-scale enfranchisement of the Indian immigrants", The Commission, therefore, left the existing basis of franchise in Sri Lanka undisturbed. D. S. Senanayake had led the 1941 talks with Sir G. S. Bajpai of India and had reached agreement on modalities of repatriation and citizenship, although they were finally not ratified by Indian Prime Minister Jawaharlal Nehru. D. S. Senanayake had expressed the wish to "embrace all Indian workers who integrate into the country as members of the Ceylonese nation", and had been relatively sympathetic, as early as 1928, and as late as 1941, to the granting of citizenship to Indian workers who wished to become permanent residents of the island.

The Soulbury constitution came into effect in 1946. In trying to cobble an all-party cabinet inclusive of the Tamils, led by G. G. Ponnambalam, the Sinhalese nationalist groups led by S. W. R. D Bandaranaike, the Kandyan Sinhalese, Senanayake had to find a compromise formula. The 1947 elections had returned six representatives from the Ceylon Indian Congress (CIC), based on the votes of the franchised Indian workers and Hill Country Tamils. Although this worried the Kandyans, the main reason for Senanayake and others to review their attitude to Indian workers was the growing threat of Marxist infiltration into estate trade unions. In this he had won the concurrence of G. G. Ponnambalam for the second citizenship act, which required ten years of residence in the island as a condition for becoming citizens of the new nation. Senanayake, who had been very favourable to easy citizenship for Indian workers had increasingly modified his views in the face of Marxist trade union activity. The Bracegirdle affair was regarded as the harbinger of such dangers. The fear of left-wing politics began to grow in the minds of Sri Lankan politicians of the era. The colonial government responded to the agitation of the leftists by imprisoning N. M. Perera, Colvin R. de Silva and other left leaders. Anti Marxist feelings were shared by the mainstream Sinhalese and Tamil leaders alike. (, Ch. 36). The criticism in the house was levelled by Tamil members of the upper chamber (senate), like Senator Natesan, who pointed out that Senanayake had supported the franchise of the Indian Tamils till recently, and had "caved in" more recently.

==== Parliamentary acts ====
As the first prime minister, D.S. Senanayake, leader of the UNP, feared the strong possibilities of Marxist disruption of government and commenced the task of weakening the Marxist parties and their associate organizations. Thus the newly independent first cabinet introduced the Ceylon Citizenship Act of 1948, the Indian-Pakistani Citizenship act of 1949 and amended the parliamentary elections act. The requirements of "ten years of residence for married persons, and seven years for unmarried persons", stipulations in the 1949 act were in line with the legislation used by European nations at the time. It also allowed citizenship to “a person born in Ceylon prior to the date of the Act coming into force, of a father born in Ceylon”. However, this was in effect a continuation of the older, somewhat harsher status quo of the Indian workers in the 1930s, prior to the Donoughmore constitution, which called for only five years' residence.

==== Opposition views ====
However, Ponnambalam and Senanayake were strongly criticized by the Marxist groups as well as by the pro-Sri Lankan Tamil Federal Party, it branded Ponnambalam a "traitor", and Senanayake a "Sinhalese extremist". S. J. V. Chelvanayakam, the leader of the Tamil Arasu Katchi, contested the citizenship act before the Supreme Court, and then in the Privy Council in England, on grounds of discrimination towards minorities but the decision concluded that the citizenship act stipulated conditions well in line with those of European states. As the president of the Ceylon Indian Congress (CIC), S. Thondaman had contested the Nuwara Eliya seat in the 1947 general election and won. His party put forward seven candidates in the plantation electorates and six of them were returned. Thus Thondaman became the spokesperson of the plantation workers. The CIC sat with the opposition, which included the Marxist parties. He opposed the 1948 citizenship act. Thondaman supported the Sri Lanka Freedom Party (SLFP) in the 1960 elections; after the victory of the SLFP he was appointed to the House of Representatives as a nominated member of Parliament. However, he opposed the 1964 Sirima–Shastri Indo-Ceylon citizenship act. After the victory of the UNP in 1965, S. Thondaman was named as appointed member of Parliament by the UNP.

==== Final rectification ====
The J.R.Jayawardene government that came to power in 1977 rectified the existing shortcomings of the Indian citizenship act and granted citizenship to all Indian estate workers (see below). Even at that time, Thondaman was the leader of the Ceylon Workers Congress, the party of the Hill Country Tamils, and had become a skilful player of minority-party politics. He had avoided joining with the Tamil United Liberation Front (TULF) resolutions of 1974, which had continued with the policies of the ITAK. Thus the Hill Country Tamils had successfully charted a course of cooperating with successive Sri Lankan governments.

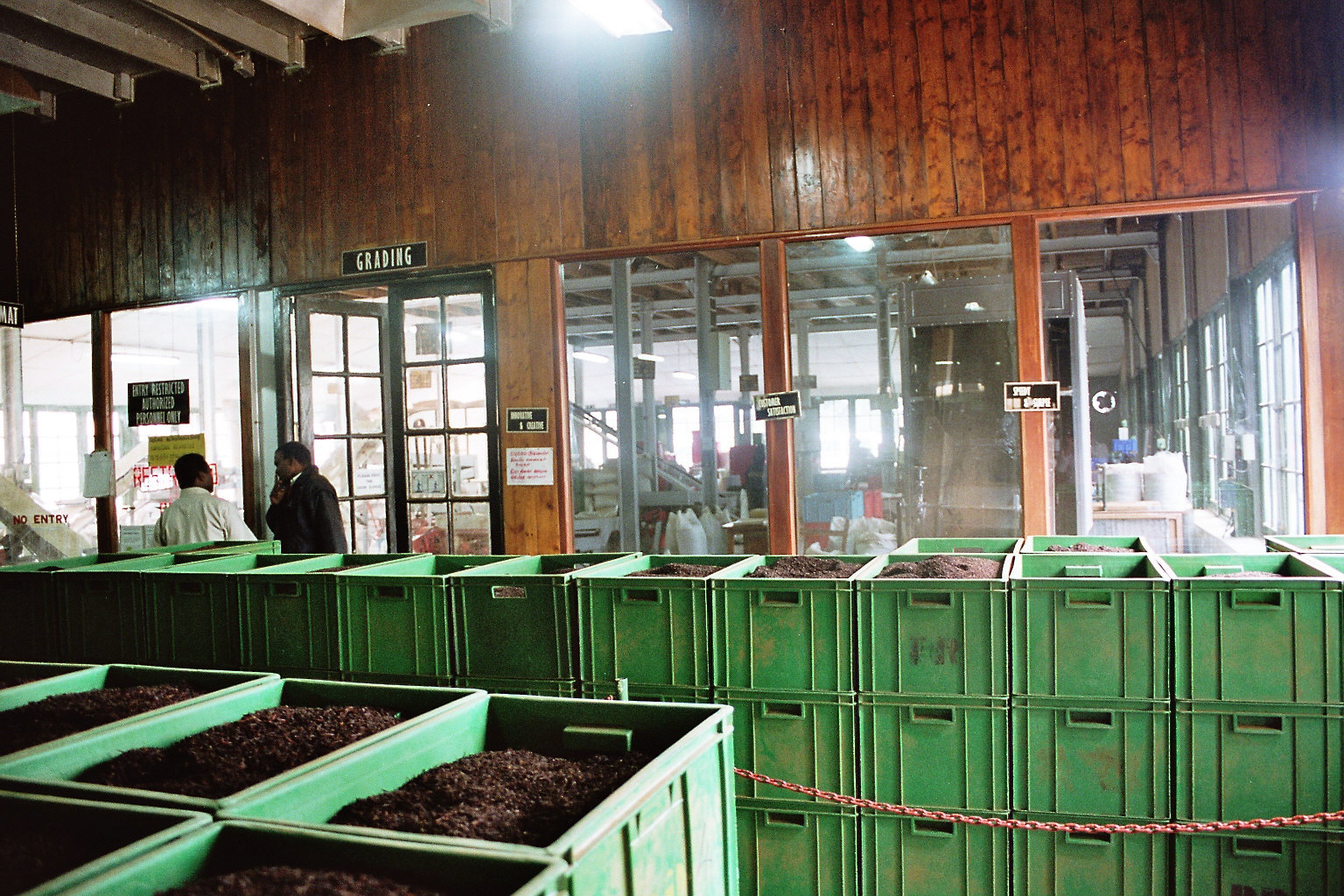
Inside a tea processing factory

The Sirima–Shastri Pact of 1964 and Indira-Sirimavo supplementary agreement of 1974 paved the way for the repatriation of 600,000 persons of Indian origin to India. Another 375,000 persons were accepted as citizens of Sri Lanka, which made them enter the polity. These repatriation agreements were the harbingers of the destruction of this community, which had evolved into a composite group with a distinct culture of its own. In the 1950s and 1960s this community was clamouring for education and recognition of its distinctive culture. This brought in the emergence of a community consciousness and the artisan of a distinct community. An educated middle class made up of teachers, trade unionists and other professional began to make its appearance. There was a vigorous campaign for social amelioration and increased educational facilities. There was a growing spirit of resistance. People destroyed Indian passports and refused to go to India. Repatriation was resisted. International opinion was canvassed against deprivation of citizenship rights. The plantation people who were not prepared to leave, destitute, the land whose property they had built. They were prepared to fraternize within the Sinhalese and accept Sri Lankan leadership in the trade union movement. In the general election of 1977 they were able to elect 11 candidates. This helped the emergence of the plantation people as a political force, but they were faced with communal violence in 1977, 1983 and in 2000. In 1984–85, to stop India's intervention in Sri Lankan affairs, the UNP government granted citizenship right to all stateless persons. The late Savumiamoorthy Thondaman was instrumental in using this electoral strength in improvement of the socioeconomic conditions of Hill Country Tamils. The plight of the repatriated persons in India has not been good.

== Society ==
=== Demographics ===
Historical population
Year	Pop.	±%
1911	531,000	—
1921	602,700	+13.5%
1931	818,500	+35.8%
1946	780,600	−4.6%
1953	974,100	+24.8%
1963	1,123,000	+15.3%
1971	1,174,606	+4.6%
1981	818,656	−30.3%
1989 (est.)	873,000	+6.6%
2001	855,000	−2.1%
2011	839,504	−1.8%
2024	600,360	−28.5%
Source:Department of Census & Statistics; Data is based on Sri Lankan Government Census.

Census operations started in Sri Lanka in 1871. The Census of 1871, 1881, 1891 and 1901 had lumped together Sri Lankan Tamils and Indian Tamils. Since 1911, Indian Tamils have been shown as a separate category. The population statistics are revealing. In 1911, Indian Tamils constituted 12.9 per cent of the population, whereas Sri Lankan Tamils formed 12.8 per cent; in 1921, 13.4 per cent and 11.5 per cent; in 1931, 15.2 and 11.3; in 1946, 11.7 and 11.0; in 1953, 12.0 and 10.9; in 1963, 10.6 and 11.0; in 1971, 11.6 and 11.2; and in 1981, 5.5 per cent and 12.7 per cent respectively.

The statistics reveal a more than 50 per cent fall in the Indian Tamil population between 1971 and 1981. The main reason for the fall was the repatriation of Indian citizens to India. Another fact is that many Indian Tamils, after acquiring Sri Lankan citizenship, declared themselves as Sri Lankan Tamils. Some Tamils who migrated to urban areas and also to the north and the east also followed this same example.

=== Language ===
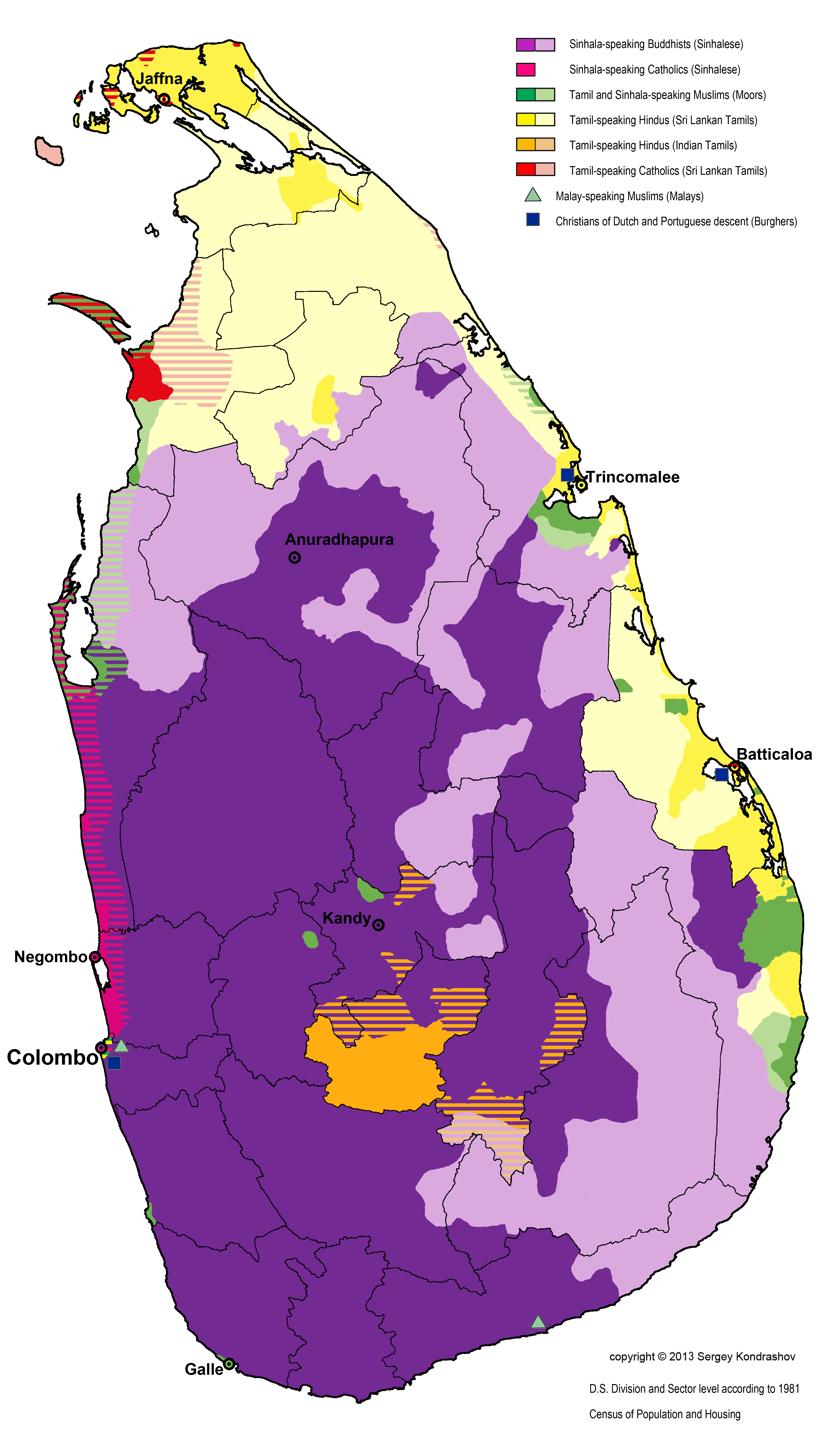
Distribution of languages and religious groups of Sri Lanka on D.S. division and sector level according to the 1981 Census of Population and Housing

Percentage of Indian Tamil people in Sri Lanka by district according to the 2012 census

Indian Tamils of Sri Lanka predominantly speak Tamil, however depending on where they live in the country, they may also additionally speak Sinhala and or English. According to the 2012 Census 61.5% or 412,685 Indian Tamils of Sri Lanka also spoke Sinhala and 13.0% or 87,435 Indian Tamils of Sri Lanka also spoke English.

=== Social structure ===
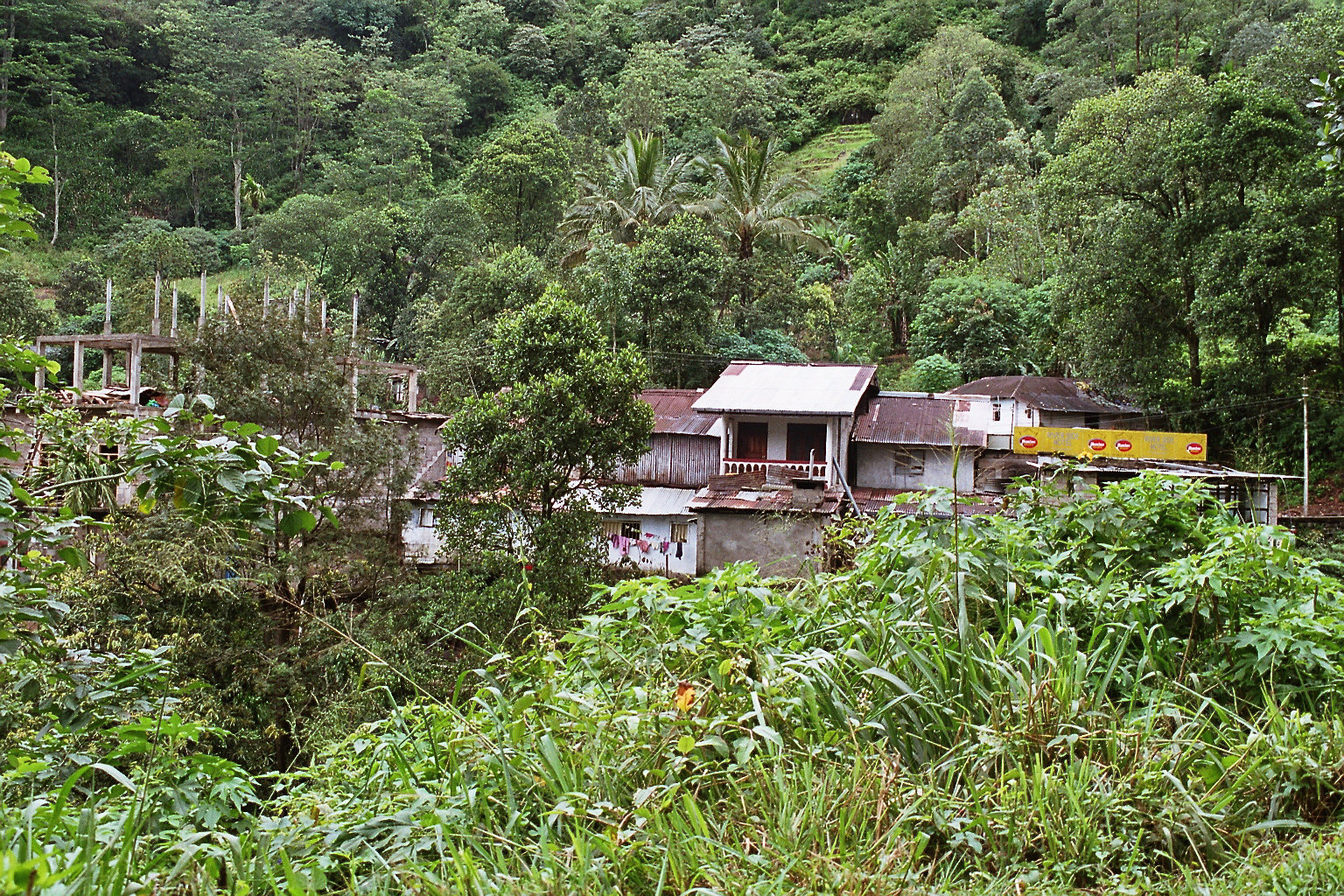
Typical line housing of estate workers

The social structure of the plantations resembles the South Indian rural social structure. The community is generally bound by the caste system. In a plantation, the tea factory is the centre of activities and it stands in the central part of the plantation. The office adjoins this and these are surrounded by the quarters of the staff members such as clerks, tea makers, conductors, petty accountants or kanakkupillais, and supervisors. The bungalows of the planter and his assistants are in an isolated areas. These will be in close proximity to the office. The dwellings of the workers called line rooms are situated a little further away from the factories.

Those who are considered to be of higher castes occupy the first row of line rooms. They perform respectable jobs such as factory work and grinding of tea as minor labour work. Even though they belong to the labour category they are influential among conductors, tea makers, kanganies (or supervisors) and other officials. The workers considered low caste live in the dwellings that are away from the centre and these dwellings are called distant or lower lines. This group consists of Pallar, Paraiyars, Sakkiliar, washers and barbers. The yard sweepers and changers of clothes are in the lowest rank.

=== Customs ===
These groups follow the customs, traditions, and festivities of their South Indian Tamil ancestors. The traditional musical instruments such as thappu and parai are used and folk dances such as the kavadi, kummi and karaga attam are performed. Folk dramas called koothu in their various forms such as ponnar koothu, sangaran koothu, arujunan thabas and kaman koothu are still prevalent among them along with silambadi as an important feature.

=== Religion ===
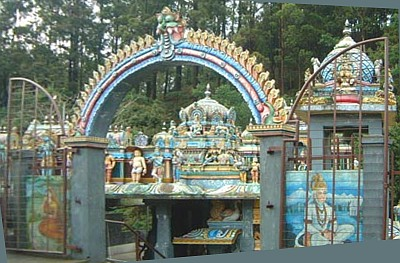
A temple to Hanuman near Nuwara Eliya

In general they use Hindu beliefs to guide their day-to-day lives. There are number of temples and places of worship for deities on estates and in villages, towns and other places within Sri Lanka to which they have migrated. When a place is decided to be settled, the settlers would institute, under a banyan or bo tree, a triangular shaped stone or figure of a deity, plant a weapon of a popularly worshipped god such as a spear, trident or sword and worshipped these. The main deities worshipped are, in order of popularity, the goddess Mariamman, Murugan and his consorts, Valli and Theivanai, Pillayar, Siva, Parvathi, Vishnu and Laxmi, and the goddess of wisdom Saraswati.

In 1981 about 90 percent of the Indian Tamils were Hindus. They have little contact with Buddhism, and they worship the Hindu pantheon of gods. Their religious myths, stories of saints, literature, and rituals are distinct from the cultural sources of the Sinhalese. Furthermore, a minority of the Indian Tamils- 7.6 percent are converts to Christianity, with their own places of worship and separate cultural lives. In this way, the large Tamil minority in Sri Lanka is effectively separated from the mainstream Sinhalese culture and is fragmented into two major groups with their own Christian minorities.

The first known temple was built in Matale. It began as a stone an icon of the goddess Mariamman. At this very location where the worship of her began in 1820, the now-famous Matale Sri Muthumariamman Temple was built in 1852. The trading community of the Nattukotai Chettiars introduced the worship of Murugan in his form as Lord Kathiresan at Matale and was to subsequently build the Kathiresan temple at Matale. The annual festival of this temple is celebrated in the month of July. Devotees of the plantation sector walk from the tea estates and hometowns they live in to Kathirkamam, a place considered sacred by both Buddhists and Hindus, in the South of Sri Lanka, where Murugan is worshipped in the form of Skanda. Deepavali, Pongal and Tamil New Year are commonly celebrated as festivals.

==== Folk deities ====
Each caste has its own deity based on caste predecessors and are worshipped as guardian angels, such as the Kallar caste had Nallananpillai Perumal as their guardian angel to whom vows and sacrifices are made. Deities such as Madasamy, Muniandi, Kali, Madurai Veeran, Karuppanswamy, Vaalraja, Vairavar, Veerabathran, Sudalai Madan, and Roda Muni are also worshipped.

==== Temple societies ====
There were 104 registered Hindu temples in the Nuwara Eliya District, 153 in Kandy region and 62 in Matale in 2001. Religious schools or araa nerri padasaligal are conducted throughout the Central Province and registered schools of such nature are, Nuwara Eliya 22, Kandy 54 and Matale 11. A considerable number of Hindu associations and institutions have been established and are functioning actively. There is a serious effort at conversions to other religions as well. Many have converted to Christianity and Islam. Hindu organizations such as the Vishva Hindu Parishad try to stem the tide of conversions.

== Labour practices ==
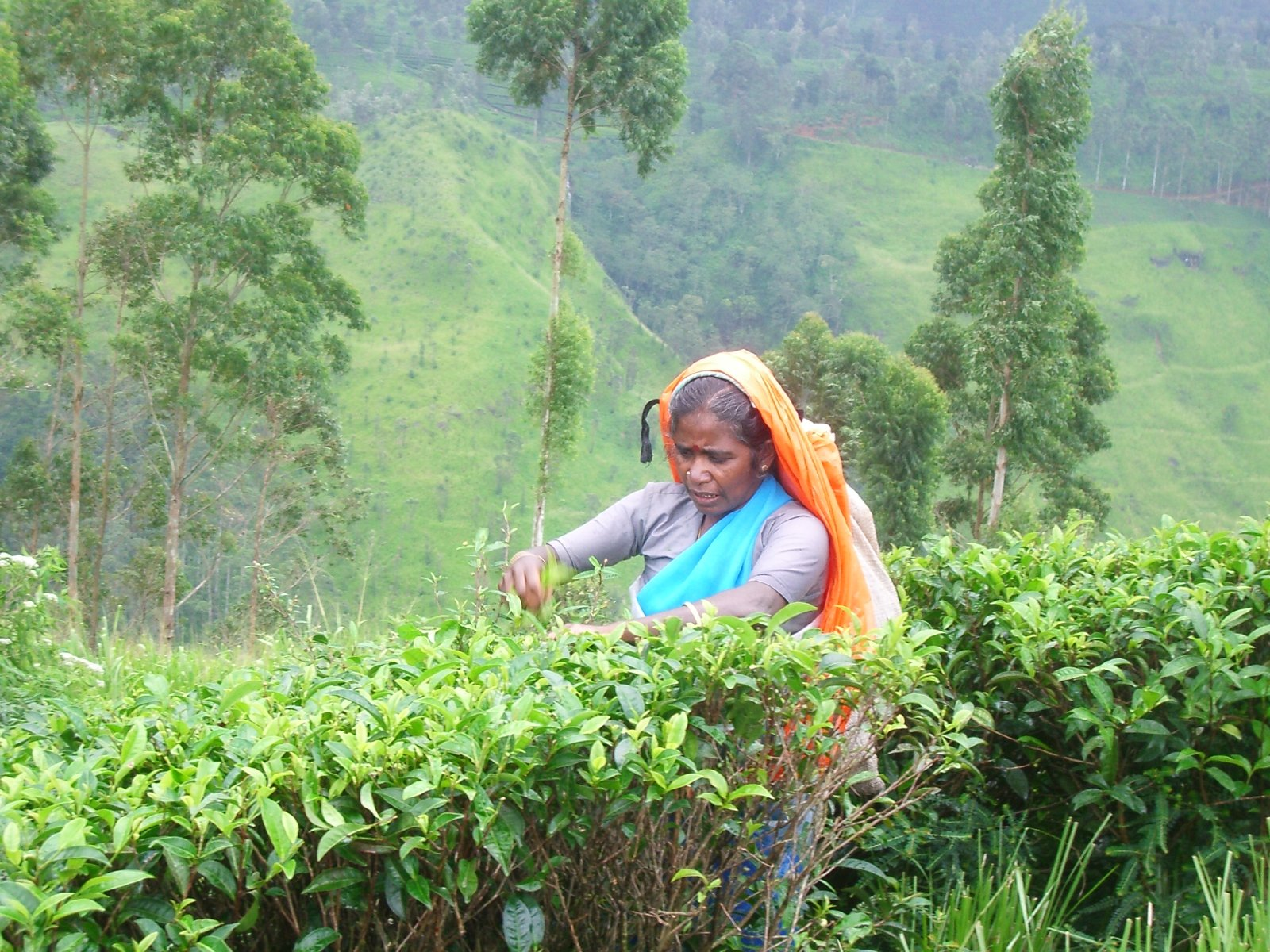
Manual tea plucking in Sri Lanka

Based on the cultivation of cash crops, labour is the dominant sector in the country's economy. It is a major earner of foreign exchange and the largest employer. Cheap labour is one of the essential ingredients of its success. Hence these immigrants were bonded and underpaid. In 1921 workers were empowered to break these bonds of indebtedness tying them to the estates. The minimum wages ordinance was extended to plantation labour in 1927 marginally raising the wages that had not changed since the 19th century. This daily wages was 41 Cts. in 1933. Owing to trade union activities it was raised to Rs 17/83 in 1983, Rs 72/24 in 1993 and became Rs 101 in 1998. The wages of female workers was less than males but has been equalized since 1984. Even though there was an increase in wages, the living wages are not sufficient to meet their day-to-day needs. The plantations were nationalized under the 1972 land reform law and its 1975 amendment. The state owned plantations are managed by the Sri Lanka Plantation Corporation and the Janatha Estate Development Board. The nationalization did not result in any basic change on the plantation sector. The state has been forced to take a greater interest in the health, housing and general well-being of the labourers. Hence estate schools were nationalized and brought into the general educational system. With the grant of the Swedish International Development Agency (SIDA), many schools were built. This helped the slight growth of literacy rates. With the increased unemployment, plantation sector youths looked for other avenues. A considerable number of Indian Tamil girls are employed in garment factories. Some work in the Middle East as housemaids. There is net migration towards urban areas as well as foreign countries. Prior to the commencement of the Sri Lankan civil war many had migrated to the Northern Province. Now the plantation communities have the Plantation Human Development Trust, developed to protect their rights and ensure adequate facilities are provided such as crèches and toilets. Other NGOs work towards the development of the plantation communities such as Shining Life Children's Trust and Hanguranketha Women's Foundation.

== Notable people ==
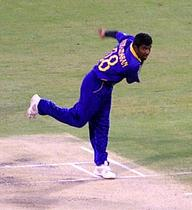
Muttiah Muralitharan, greatest spin bowler in history, is of Indian Tamil descent

- Muttiah Muralitharan – Sri Lanka international spin bowler; world record holder for most wickets taken in both Test cricket and ODI's
- Savumiamoorthy Thondaman – Post-independence politician
- Mano Ganesan – Prominent human rights activist, trade unionist and politician
- Arumugan Thondaman – Sri Lankan politician
- K. Natesa Iyer – Sri Lankan journalist, trade unionist and politician

== See also ==
- Sri Lankan Tamils in India
- Colombo Chetties
- Bharatakula
- South Indian Immigration towards Sri Lanka
