= Sri Lankan place name etymology =

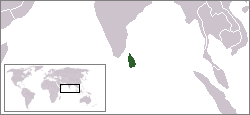
Location of Sri Lanka

Sri Lankan place name etymology is characterized by the linguistic and ethnic diversity of the island of Sri Lanka through the ages and the position of the country in the centre of ancient and medieval sea trade routes. While typical Sri Lankan placenames of Sinhalese origin vastly dominate, toponyms which stem from Tamil, Dutch, English, Portuguese and Arabic also exist. In the past, the many composite or hybrid place names and the juxtaposition of Sinhala and Tamil placenames reflected the coexistence of people of both language groups. Today, however, toponyms and their etymologies are a source of heated political debate in the country as part of the political struggles between the majority Sinhalese and minority Sri Lankan Tamils.

== Morphological structure of place names ==
The morphological structure of Sri Lankan place names by and large depends on the language. Sinhala and Tamil favour transparent compounds involving geological features combined with an animal or plant, while the European languages are more person centered and derive place names from saints or nobility or army.

=== Sinhalese ===
Place names of Sinhala origin, have a typical X+Y structure, where Y is a geographical feature such as mountain, river or village and X is a qualifier, like an animal or plant often found at that place, or otherwise associated with it. Examples for this are

- singha+pitiya "lion place"
- weli+gama "sand village"
- monara+gala "peacock rock".

Commonly used trees in village names are pol (coconut) and Kitul (palm), among others.

The X part can be complex as in

- kiri bath goda = milk rice village

The X part can also refer to social concepts like caste. Examples for this are waduwa (carpenter), batta (lower caste settlement), ambataya (barber), aruwa (potter), goviya (farmer), bamuna (Brahmin) and Villiya (Rodiya).

Besides the Y parts already mentioned, other commonly used land usage forms are Kumbura (paddy fields), Deniya, watte (garden), pola, gama (village), and Hena (cultivated lands). Grasslands were termed as talava and tree groves were termed golla. Village tanks were called pokuna or katuwa. Irrigation tanks were called wewa. Canals from such lakes were called aala. Flat lands were termed botha. Ports were termed tota. Names of flower gardens belonging to Buddhist establishments end with uyana.

=== Tamil ===
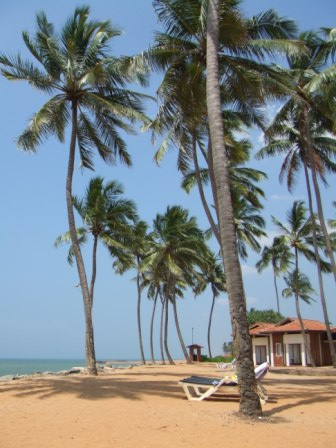
In both Sinhala and Tamil, coconut trees often lend their names to the places where they are frequently found

Place names of Tamil origin, like Sinhala origin, also have a typical X+Y structure. The place names are simple and descriptive; they reflect criteria normal to early societies and are related to the concepts and outlooks of people of those times. The majority of the place names can be listed under caste and occupational, landforms, land classifications, coastal features, irrigation works, fields and farms, trees, animals, names of deities, personal names, old, new, big, small, good, settlement and village.

The X-part in Tamil place names is often one of the following: The commonly used trees are Vembu, Panai (palm) and Illupai. Commonly used animals and birds are Anai (elephant), Puli (tiger), and Kuranku (monkey). Other notable classifications are deities such as Amman, Andi, Kali and Pillaiyar. The commonly used caste or ethnic titles in Tamil are Chetty, Vannan and Demala.

As for the Y-part, the commonly used landforms Mulai or Mulla (corner), Malai or Male (mountain), Aru (creek), Kuda (bay) Manal (sandy place), Kuli (depression), Tivu (island), Pallam (depression) and Ur or uruwa (village). Land classification are Tottam (garden), Kudal (bay), Puval, Kadu (forest), Munai or Mune (front), Karai (coast) and Turai or Ture (port). Irrigation and agriculture classifications are Kulam or Kulama (tank), reflecting the most common village name endings in Anuradhapura and Puttalam districts, Kinaru (well), Kani (allotment), Vayal (paddy field), Vaikkal (canal) and Eri (tank).

=== Portuguese ===
The Portuguese, who came to the island in 1505 and left in 1658, often gave names of Saints to whom the churches in the vicinity were dedicated. San Sebastian Hill and St. Joseph's Road are examples of these and Milagiriya had the church of Our Lady of Miracles (milagre in Portuguese).

A name like "Grand Pass", a northern suburb of Colombo, is the English rendering of "Grande Passo", the name of a ferry established by the Portuguese, to cross the Kelani River.

Point Pedro and Mount Pedro are also place names with the name of a Portuguese person as a component, although they might have been coined by the British.

The Portuguese language furthermore was an important step stone for the English terms used today, the British would often use Portuguese names and adapt them, rather than taking the original form. An example for this is Batticaloa, and Ceylon itself.

=== Dutch ===
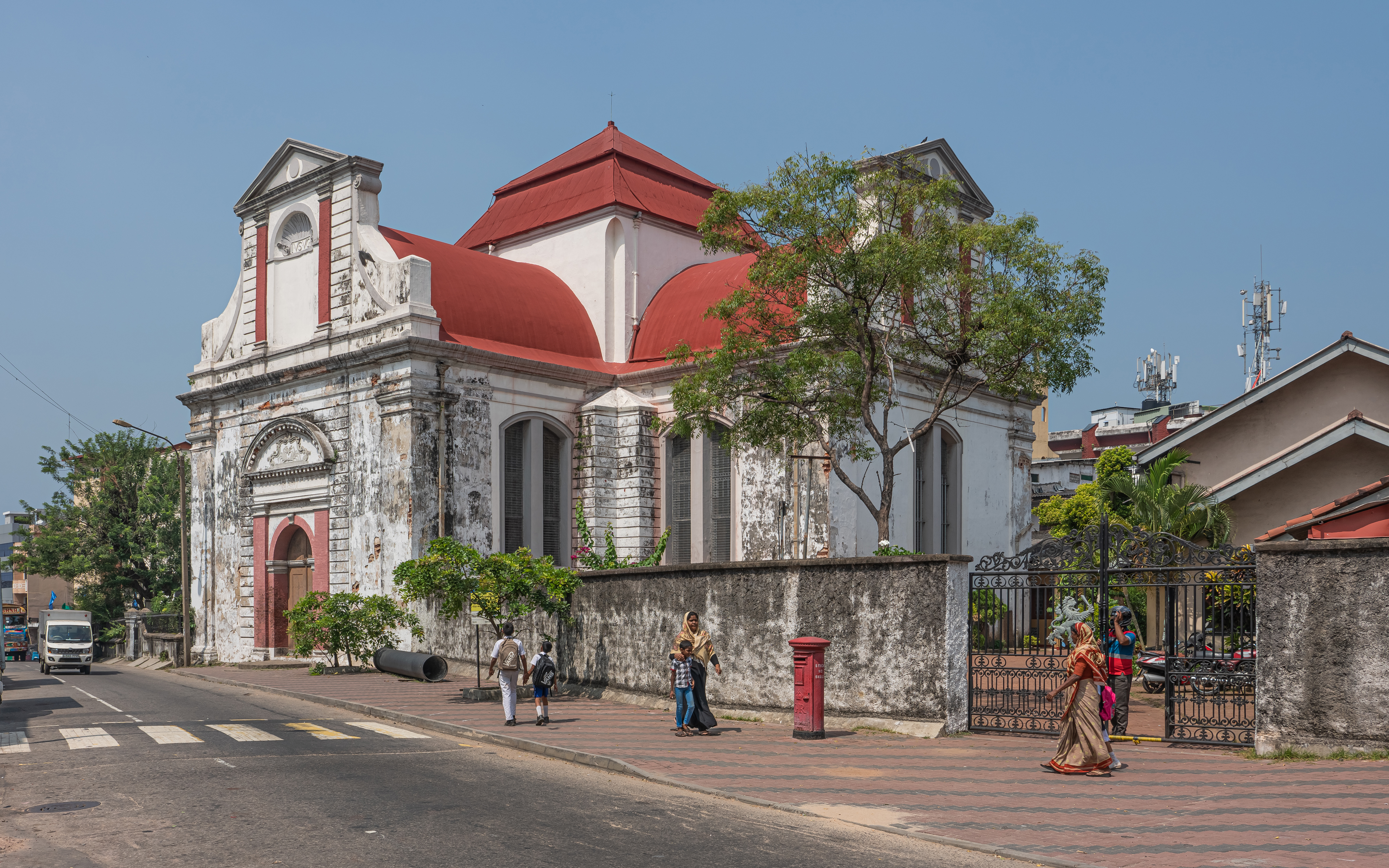
Wolfendahl Dutch Reformed Church

The Dutch ruled maritime provinces from 1658-1796. Amongst their legacy place names of Dutch origin although not many are still significant. For example, Hulftsdorp which is Dutch for 'Hulft's Village' and named after the Dutch general Gerard Pietersz. Hulft.

Among the other place-names in Colombo which are of Dutch origin may be included Bloemendahl (Vale of Flowers) and Wolvendahl (Vale of Wolves). The latter was known as 'Guadelupe' by the Portuguese, which the Dutch took to mean 'Agua de lupe' which they translated accordingly. It is still known as 'aadelippu' in Sinhala and Tamil.

The Beira lake in Colombo probably takes its name from De Beer who is believed to have been an engineer in charge of the Dutch water defenses. A granite plaque inscribed with the words 'De Beer 1700' recovered from an old Dutch sluice which controlled the flow of water from the lake has altered the hitherto accepted view that the lake takes its name from the Portuguese beira meaning 'bank or edge (of a lake)'.

The 'Maliban' biscuit brand gets its name from the Maliban Hotel, which AG Hinni Appuhamy started at Maliban St, Pettah (now AG Hinniappuhamy Mawatha) - originally Maliebaan Straat, named for Maliebaan, the Pall Mall alley in Utrecht. Leyn Baan Street in Galle is from 'lijnbaan', meaning 'rope walk' or 'ropery'.

The Dutch also christened the islands of Jaffna in remembrance of Dutch towns, such as Hoorn, Delft, Leiden, Amsterdam, Rotterdam, Middelburg and Enkhuizen, but these names (with the exception of Delft) have all but disappeared and have been replaced by their local Tamil names.

=== English ===
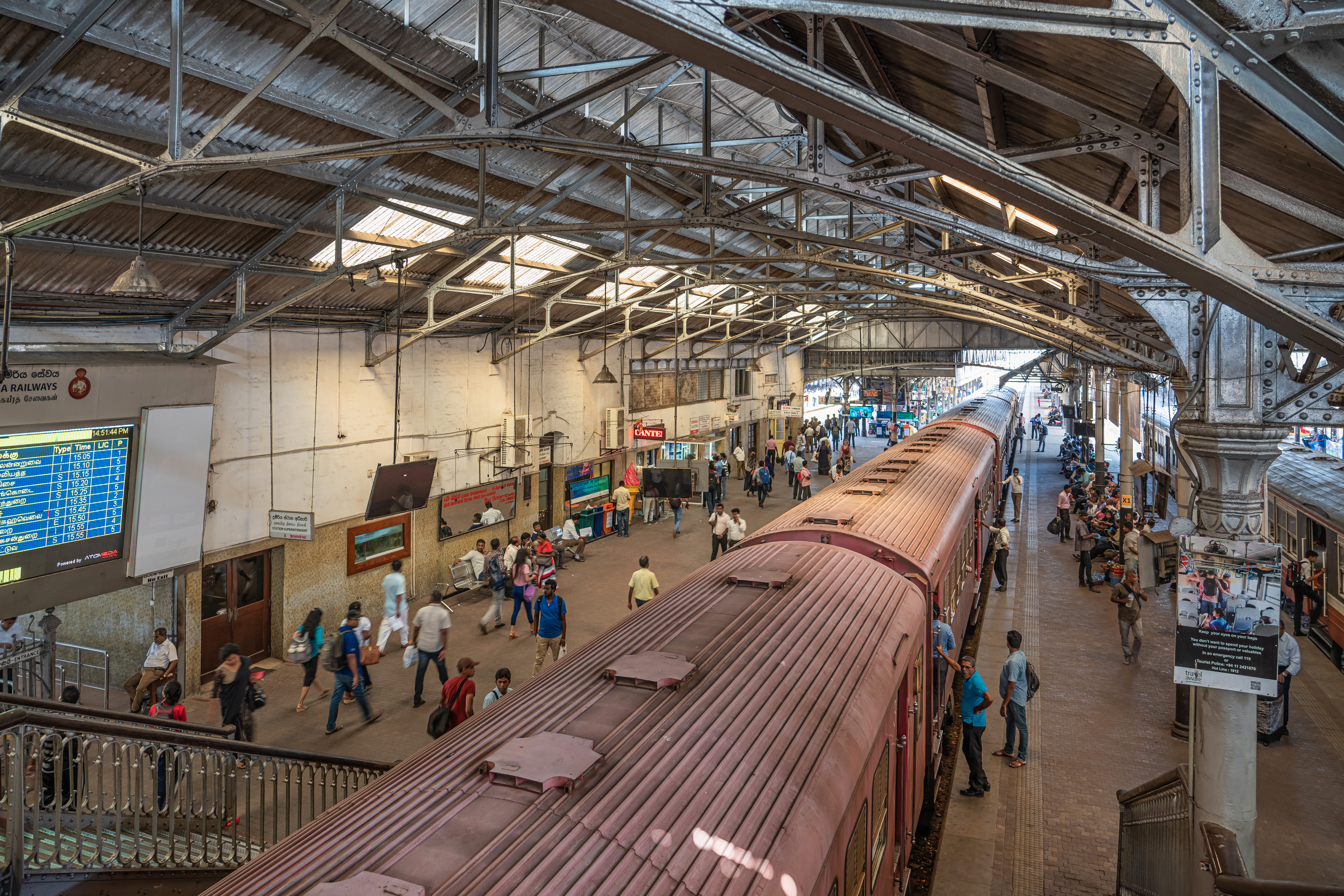
Fort Railway station in Colombo bears an English name

The British who followed the Dutch left many place names within the capital Colombo city, like streets, squares and quarters, but their influence on larger geographical features like towns is limited. Within Colombo, many of the place names have a British royal connotation, such as Queen's Street, Prince Street, Duke Street. The quarters Fort, Cinnamon Gardens, Slave Island and Mount Lavinia carry English names, next to the native ones.

Outside of Colombo, English influence can be found in the tea planting region with the towns of Hatton and Dalhousie, and several estates such as Devon, Kenilworth, Middleton, Somerset, Usk Valley and Wavenden. Scots English is also widely represented by place names such as Blinkbonnie, Holyrood, Lauderdale, Melfort and Sutherland.

Horton Plains were named for Sir Robert John Wilmot-Horton, the Governor of Ceylon, who adopted the surname of his wife, Anne Beatrix Horton. Horton Place in Colombo is also named for him.

=== Gaelic ===
Scottish planters named many of the areas they planted after Gaelic place names from Scotland. Examples are Aberdeen, Balmoral, Clyde, Culloden, Frotoft, Kinross, Perth and Strathspey.

=== Malay ===
Ja-Ela, from the Javanese Canal

=== Algonquian ===
Probably the only American Indian place name in Sri Lanka is Rappahannock, in Uda Pussellawa. It comes from the Rappahannock River in Virginia, itself originating from an Algonquian word, lappihanne (also recorded as toppehannock), meaning "river of quick, rising water" or "where the tide ebbs and flows," the name used by the local native population, the Rappahannock tribe.

=== Vedda ===
The common word gala for stones found in Sinhalese is considered to be a borrowing from indigenous Vedda language. It is used in toponyms found throughout the island.

=== Arabic ===
Place names in Arabic also exist throughout scattered pockets in Sri Lanka where substantial populations of Sri Lankan Moors reside. According to the location Arabic place names are often mixed with Sinhala or Tamil morphological naming conventions. For example, the town of Katthankudy in Eastern Sri Lanka is thought to be named after an Arab settler named "Al Qahtan".

== Origins of some well-known place names ==
=== Cities ===
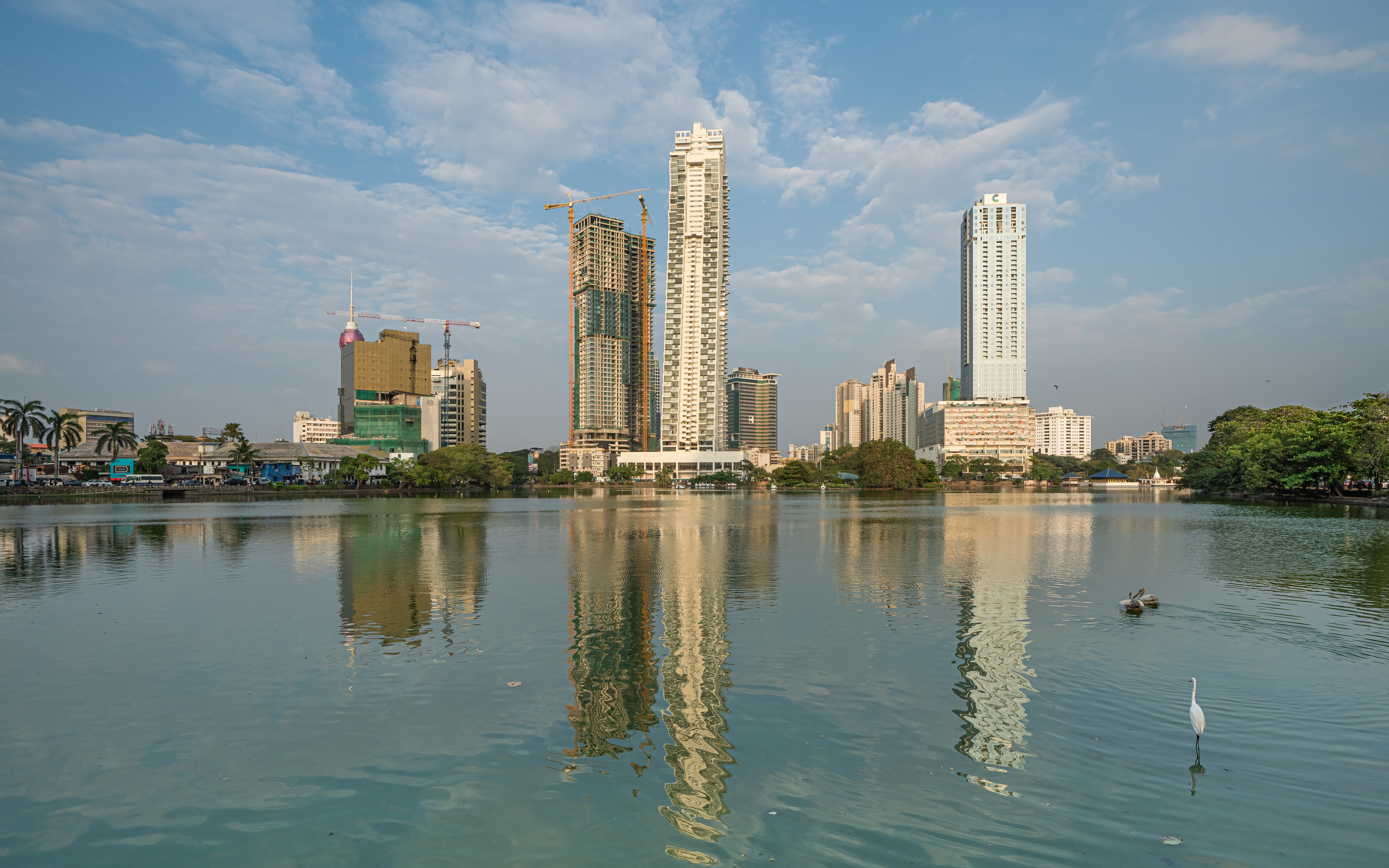
The Beira Lake in the Slave Island area in Colombo

- Colombo: from Koḷam̆ba an indigenous Vedda word for harbor or fort, borrowed by Sinhalese. However, the Portuguese were probably struck by its similarity to the name of Columbus, and renamed the city "Colombo".
- Kandy: an abbreviation of Kanda Udarata, or "hill country" which was the seat of the later Sinhala kings
- Galle: Galle was known as Gimhathitha in ancient times. The term is believed to be derived from the classical Sinhalese term meaning "port near the river Gin".
- Trincomalee, also known as Tirukkōṇamalai in Tamil: from the honorific prefix used while addressing adult males in Tamil, being the equivalent of the English "Mr." and from the words kōṇa meaning "king" and malai meaning "mountain" in Tamil
- Batticaloa: "land of the singing fish"

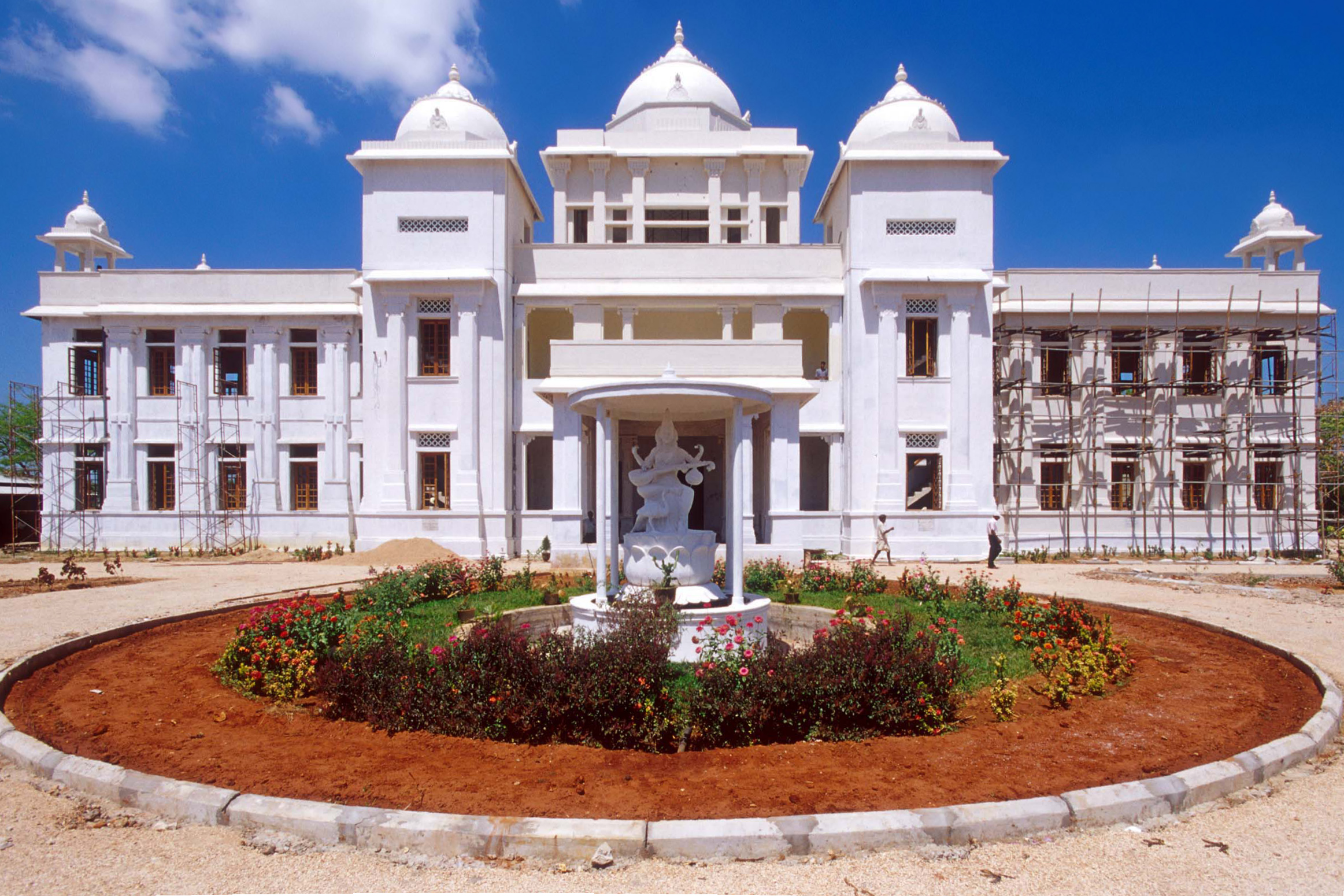
Public Library, Jaffna

- Jaffna: the English rendering of Yāḻppāṇam (யாழ்ப்பாணம்) in Tamil meaning "town of the harper". Archaeologist Paranavithana suggests that the original name was Javapatuna, where 'Java' alludes to the presence of Javaka people. The Portuguese historian De Queyroz refers to it at 'Jafanapataõ', which he says is said by some to be a corrupted form of 'Jafana-en-Putalam', or "Town of the Lord Jafana", and by others to be derived from 'Jafana-Patanaõture' meaning "long harbour".

=== Tourist places ===
- Polonnaruwa
- Anuradhapura: "city of Anuradha"
- Sigiriya: derived from the structure—singha giri, the "lion rock"
- Mihintale: derived from Mihindu (the name of the arahat monk who brought Buddhism to Sri Lanka) and thalaya ("highland"). It is mentioned in Buddhist culture that Mihindu appeared on top of a high rock which is today known as Mihintale, and preached Buddhist teachings to then king of Sri Lanka, Devanampiyathissa.
- Negombo
- Hikkaduwa
- Unawatuna
- Ambalangoda
- Bentota
- Tangalle
- Nilaweli
- Nuwara Eliya: "city of light" in Sinhala

== Geolinguistic distribution ==
As already stated above, European place names are found mainly in the big towns which used to be colonial centers. In the countryside, there is close to no European toponymy and the indigenous languages are dominant.

Given the very similar processes of place name formation in Sinhala and Tamil explicated above, it is not always easy to establish the original language of a place name, because loan translations are common in both directions. For such an alleged example of loan translation, see the case of Trincomalee above. Additionally, some place names draw on Sanskrit or Pali roots, which are then adapted to Sinhala and Tamil phonology in different ways. These intricacies must be taken into account when evaluating claims that a certain area was predominantly inhabited by one group or the other at a certain point in time.

Taking a synchronic point of view, Sinhala place names are more common in the Sinhala-speaking areas in the South, whereas Tamil place names are more common in the Tamil-speaking areas in the North and East. On a diachronic point of view, things are more complicated, and both Sinhala settlements in the North and Tamil settlements in the South have been claimed to have been more common in the past. The motivation behind such analyses is not always scientific; political goals also play a role in claiming a certain area for a certain language group, see the next section for more discussion of this. The following statements have to be interpreted with this caveat in mind.

Sinhalese place names are found throughout the island. As discussed by Sri Lankan historians such as Paul E Peiris, Karthigesu Indrapala and others, pre-Christian stone inscriptions of Sri Lanka point to the extensive use of the Sinhala language in local administration. Much of the information for tracing the old place names comes from etymology, written texts, many stone inscriptions which are in Sinhala and dating back to pre-Christian times, as well as the more recent colonial records.

Dutch and British records show that the language of the inhabitants of Vanni in the 17th and 18th centuries were Tamil; some of them considered Tamils to be 'strangers' (foreign) to the island.

According to M. Chelvadurai(a Tamil) only Tamil words were used for natural and human-made features in the Vanni region with no trace of Sinhalese words, while Vanni itself is a Sinhala word. According to Professor K. Kularatnam, when analyzing the regional distribution of place names in Sri Lanka, one not only comes across Tamil names in areas which are Sinhala-speaking, and vice versa, but also composite or hybrid place names which are part Sinhalese and part Tamil in composition, as well as Sinhalese and Tamil place names juxtaposed within small areas.

Most hybrid place names are found in the traditionally Sinhalese North Western and North Central provinces, as well as the traditionally Tamil Northern and Eastern provinces.

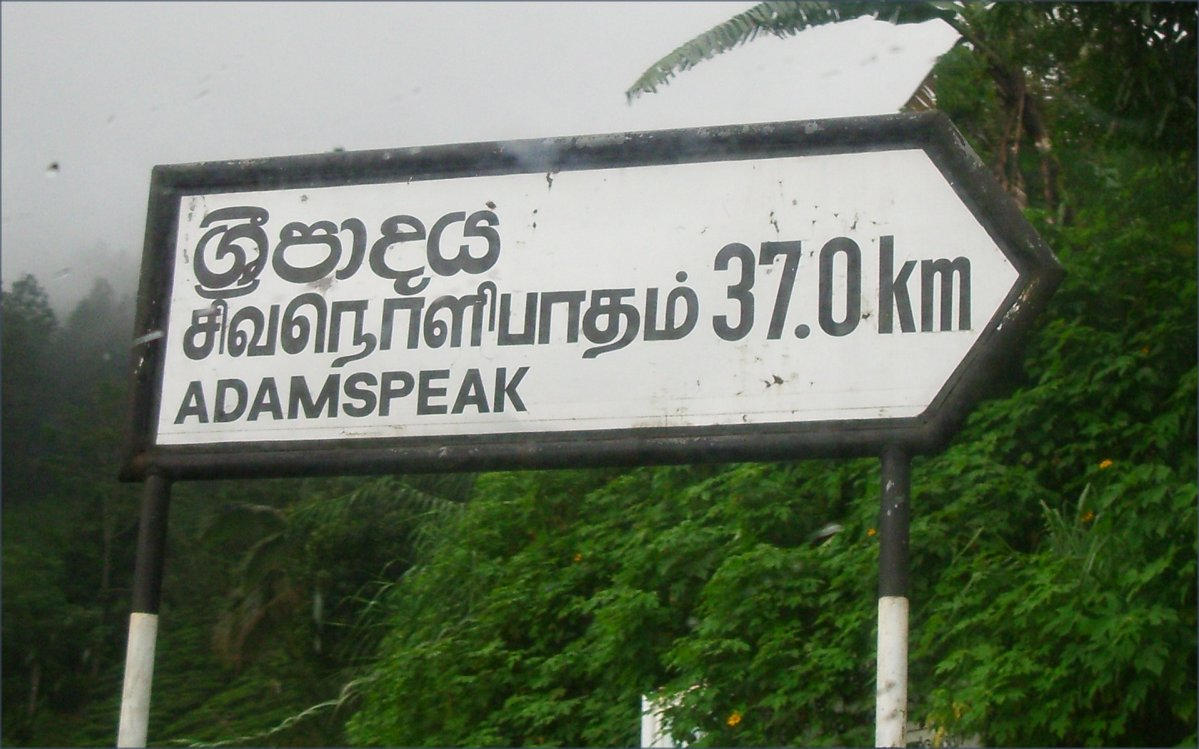
Place name sign in three languages with each linguistic version different from each other

Sigiri graffiti verses referring to the Jaffna peninsula and written c. 8th century, contain references to Vaeligama, Kularatnam concluded from the hybrid place names that the traditionally Sinhalese North Central and North Western Provinces, as well as the coastal tracts as far as south as Colombo, were inhabited by Tamil-speaking people in the past. In addition, there have been also at least small segments elsewhere in the island. The many composite or hybrid place names and the juxtaposition of Sinhala and Tamil place names indicated the peaceful coexistence of people of both language groups.

== Anthropological and political relevance of place names in Sri Lanka ==
Place names are a source of controversy in Sri Lankan politics. According to Nissan & Stirrat, the Sri Lankan Civil War is an outcome of how modern ethnic identities have been made and re-made since the colonial period, with the political struggle between minority Sri Lankan Tamils and the Sinhala-dominant government accompanied by rhetorical wars over archeological sites and place name etymologies, and the political use of the national past.

Both sides in the present political context back up their respective claims through the selective use of histories and through the selective and competitive use of archeological evidence. Factions on each side have been willing to destroy, or reinterpret, evidence which would support the other party. Differing maps are produced which purport to show the distribution of Sinhala and Tamil in Lanka during past centuries.

They further note that in the currently Tamil-dominant Northern Province there are place names with Sinhalese etymologies, which is used by the Sinhala dominant government to claim the territory, whereas Tamils using Tamil place names in rationally Sinhala areas point to their antiquity in the island. There is a movement in Sri Lanka that seeks to use original Sinhala names throughout the country.

== Historical development of the place name controversies ==
In the 1920s, two historical descriptions of Jaffna were published, Ancient Jaffna by C. Rasanayagam, and A Critical History of Jaffna by Swamy Gnanaprakasar. A main claim of these books was that the North and East were hereditary possessions of the Tamils.Upon the establishment of the University of Ceylon under the Indian historian H. C. Ray, and the archeologist S. Paranavithana, these claims were re-examined by Sinhalese academics. An issue of the Journal of the Royal Asiatic Society in 1961, examined the findings of Rasanaygam et al. and gave different interpretations.

== See also ==
- Languages of Sri Lanka
- Names of Sri Lanka
- Locations in Sri Lanka with a Scottish name
