= List of Scottish place names in other countries =

This page is a list of place names in Scotland which have subsequently been applied to other parts of the world by Scottish emigrants or explorers, or contain distinctive Scottish surnames as an element.

== Antarctica ==
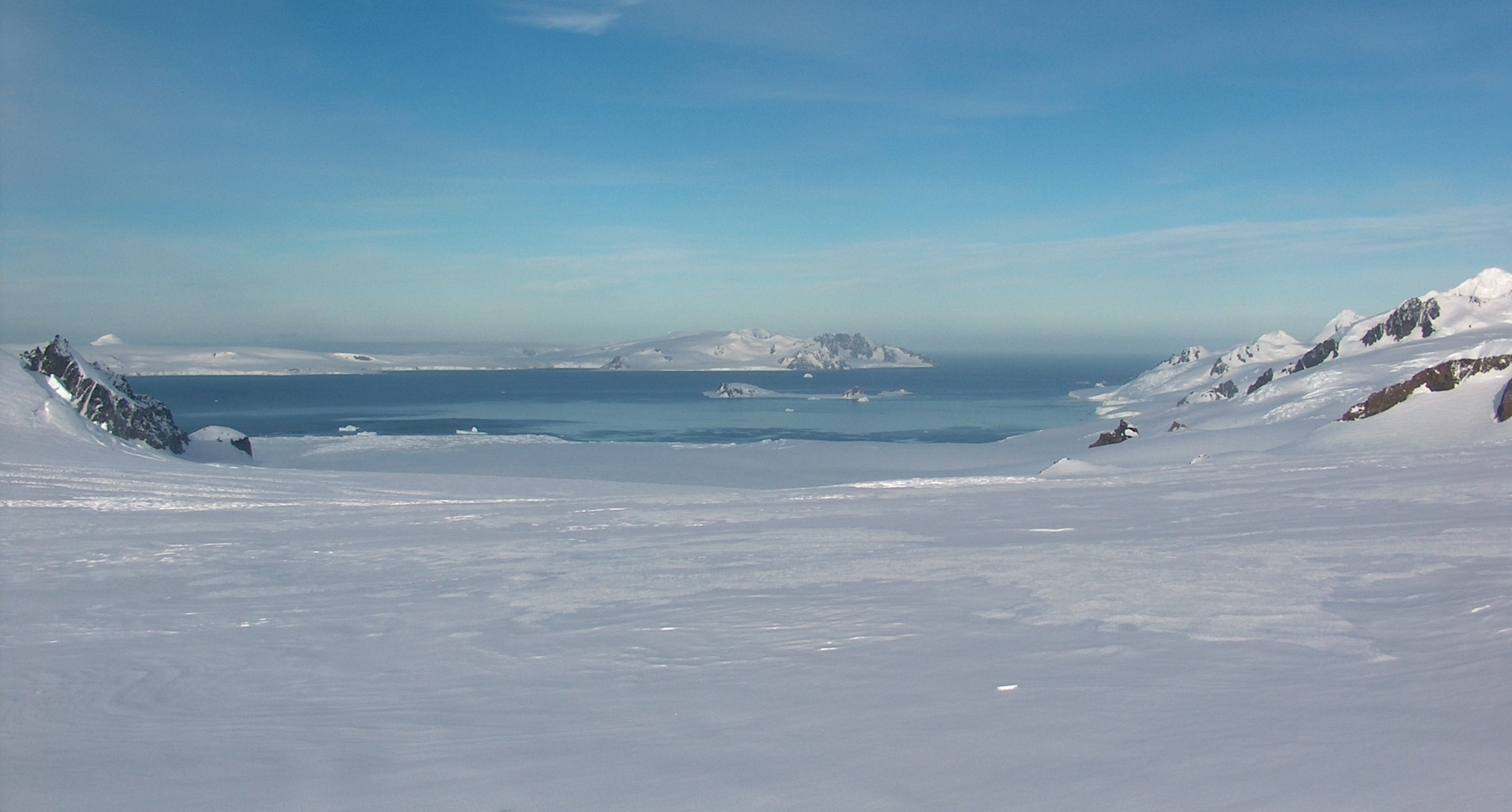
Huron Glacier and McFarlane Strait on Livingston Island, South Shetlands

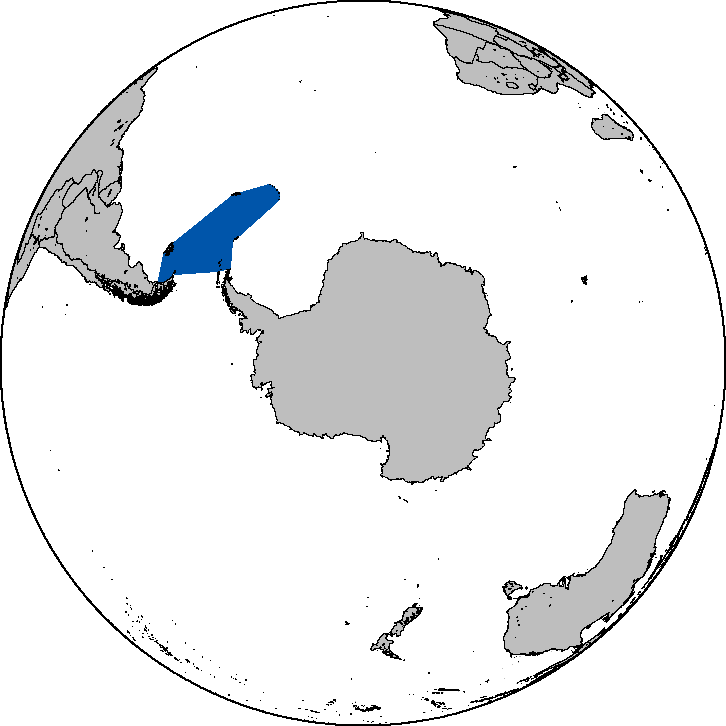
Scotia Sea

- Ailsa Craig (South Orkney Islands)
- Anderson Peninsula
- Dundee Island and Firth of Tay
- Inverleith Harbour
- McDonald Ice Rumples
- McMurdo Sound, McMurdo Ice Shelf and McMurdo Station
- McIntyre Island
- MacKenzie Bay
- Mount Campbell
- Mount Crawford (Antarctica)
- Mount Dalrymple
- Mount Douglas (Antarctica)
- Mount Hamilton (Antarctica)
- Mount Inverleith
- Mount Kirkpatrick/Kilpatrick and Kirkpatrick Basalt (named for a Glasgow businessman)
- Mount Strathcona
- Robertson Island
- Robertson Islands
- Scotia Arc and Scotia Sea
- South Orkneys
  - Cape Geddes
  - Laurie Island (named by Scottish National Antarctic Expedition)
  - Nigg Rock
  - Orcadas Base
  - Omond House
  - Scotia Bay
- South Shetlands
  - Barclay Bay
  - Duff Point
  - Gibbs Island
  - Livingston Island, McFarlane Strait (Livingston)
  - McFarlane Strait
  - Morton Strait
  - South Shetland Trough

== Argentina ==
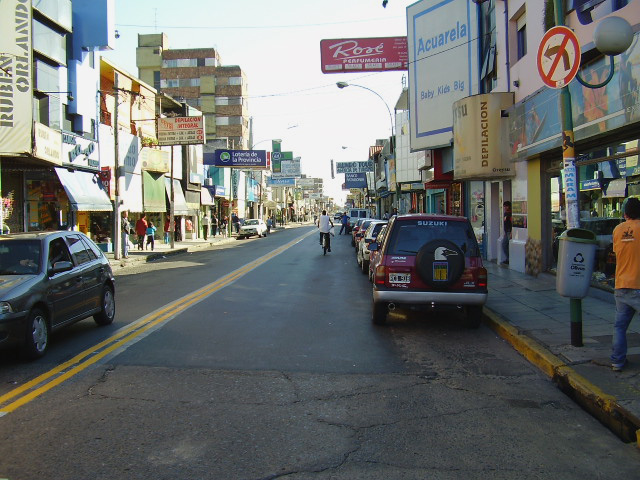
Munro, Argentina

- Armstrong, Santa Fe
- Drysdale, Buenos Aires - a settlement in Carlos Tejador Partido, Argentina
- Henderson, Buenos Aires
- Munro, Buenos Aires (Duncan Mackay Munro)
- Nueva Escocia - Spanish for New Scotland

== Australia ==
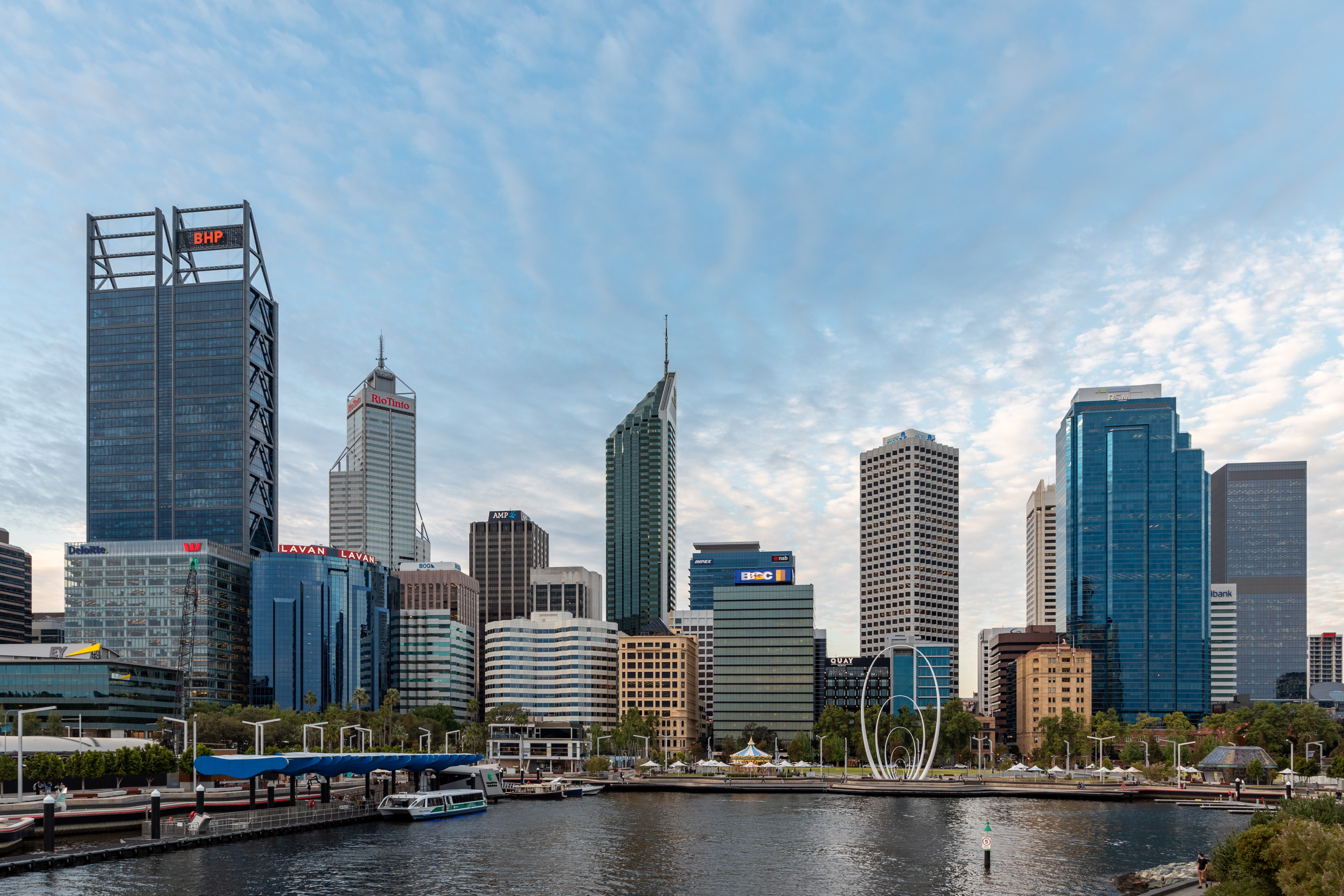
The Perth skyline viewed from Elizabeth Quay

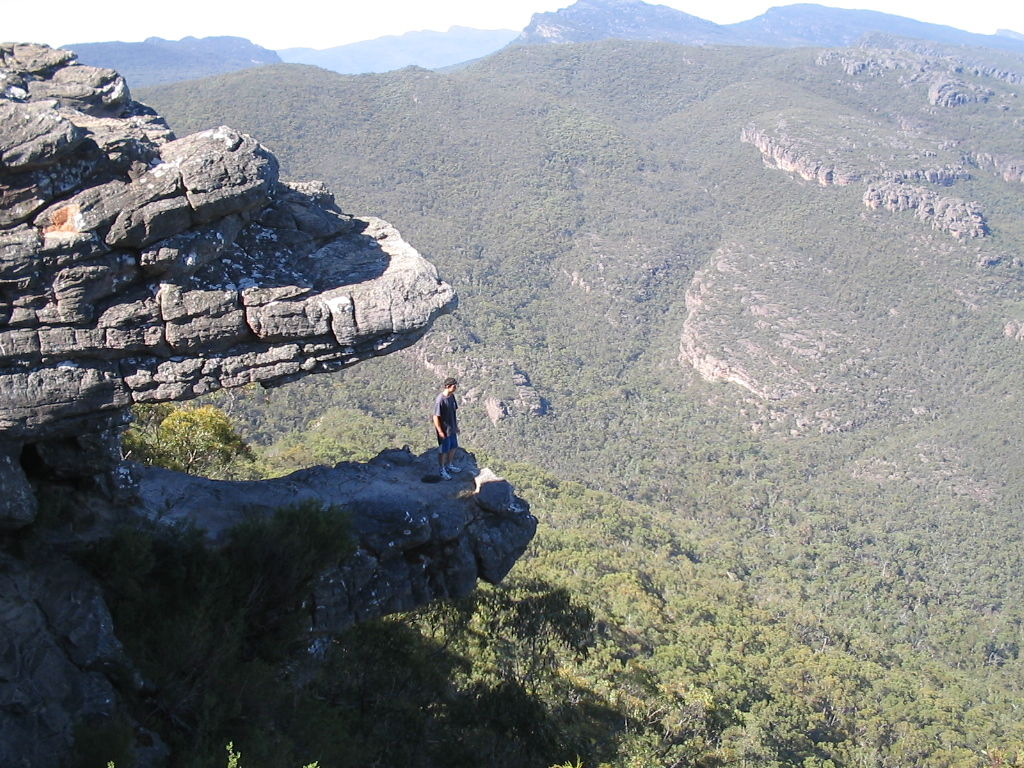
The Balconies (formerly known as the 'Jaws of Death') - Grampians National Park, Victoria, Australia

- New South Wales
  - Ben Lomond
  - Glen Innes
  - Dalgety
- Northern Territory
  - MacDonnell Ranges
- Queensland
  - Aramac (R. R. Mackenzie)
  - Ayr
  - Brisbane (Thomas Brisbane)
  - Cairns
  - Esk
  - Kilcoy
  - Logan City (Patrick Logan)
  - Mackay (John Mackay)
  - Mitchell (Thomas Mitchell)
- Tasmania
  - Ben Lomond
  - Suburbs of Hobart-Glenorchy-
    - Glenorchy and City of Glenorchy
- Victoria
  - Grampians, Victoria
  - St. Kilda
  - Dunkeld
- Western Australia
  - Marvel Loch, Western Australia
  - Perth
  - Stirling
  - Stirling Range

== Barbados ==
- Names in Bridgetown, Barbados (not a Scottish name)
  - Arthurs Seat
  - Callendar
  - Carrington
  - Inch Marlowe (Inchmarlo)
  - Montrose
- James Town (King James VI of Scotland)
- Saint James, Barbados

== Bermuda ==
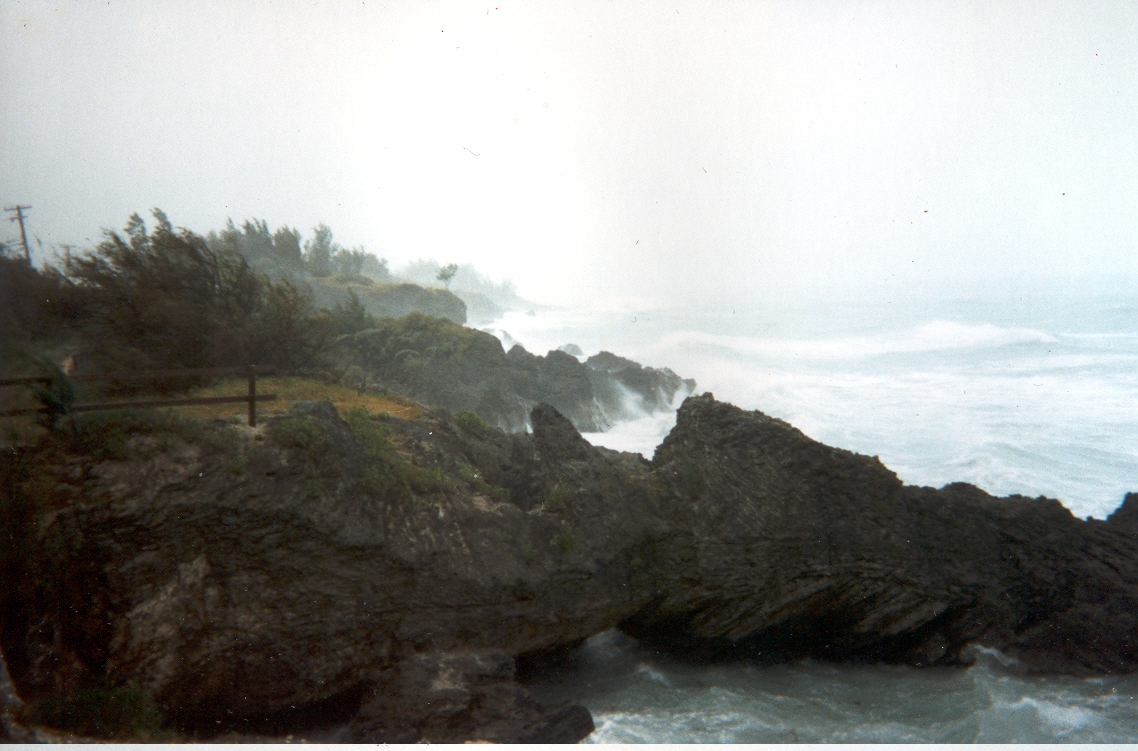
The coast of Callan Glen, Hamilton Parish, Bermuda.

- Callan Glen
- Great Scaur
- Hamilton
- Hamilton Parish (Note that Hamilton is not in Hamilton Parish)
- Little Scaur
- McGall's Bay
- McGall's Hill
- Scaur Hill
- Scaur Hill Fort
- Spittal Pond

== Bulgaria ==
- Atolovo (Bulgarian: Атолово, from the Bulgarian transliteration of Atholl and the Slavic toponymic suffix "-ovo")

== Canada ==
Also note that, unless otherwise stated, province names are not Scottish.

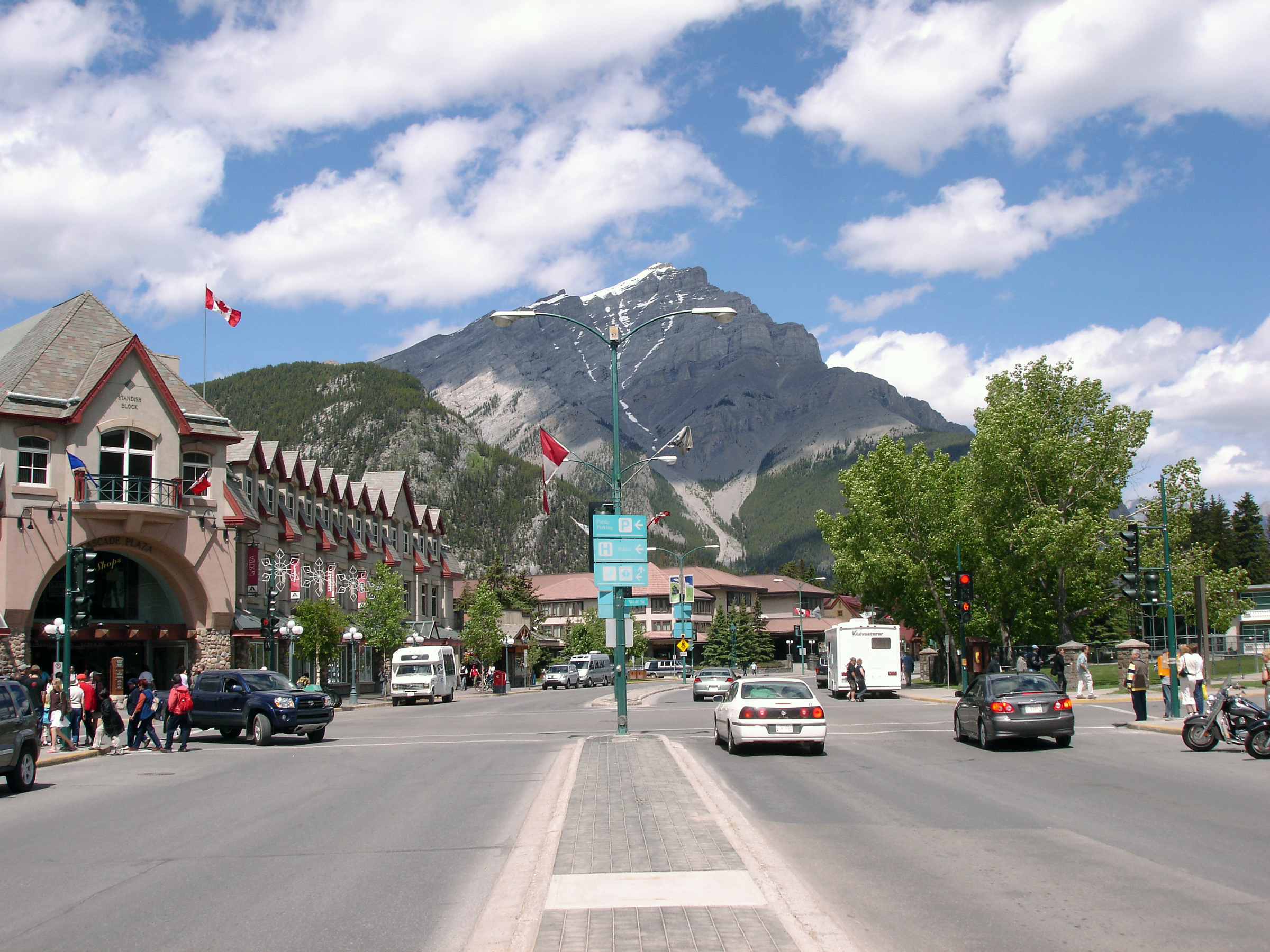
Banff, Alberta

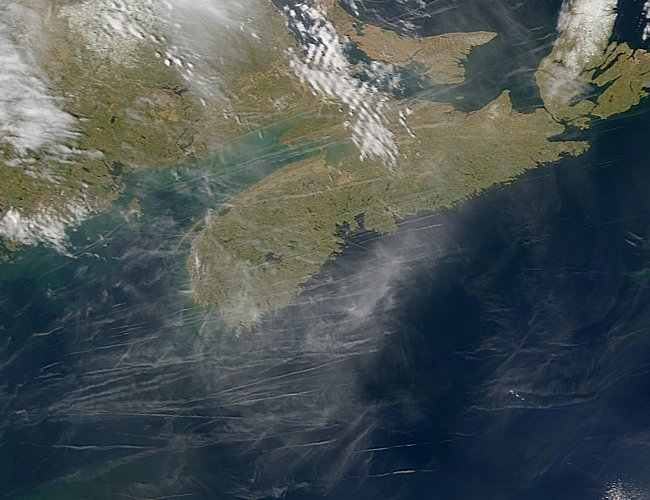
A satellite photo of Nova Scotia.

- Alberta
  - Banff - named after town in north east Scotland
  - Calgary - named after Calgary, in Mull
- New Brunswick
  - Perth-Andover

Caledonia Mountain

- Nova Scotia - Latin for New

Scotland

  - Inverness County, Nova Scotia
  - Victoria County, Nova Scotia
  - Arisaig
  - Glendale
  - Iona
  - New Glasgow
  - Sunnybrae
  - Aberdeen
  - Halifax
  - Dundee

For Nova Scotian names in Scottish Gaelic (not necessarily the same as the English versions) see:

Canadian communities with Scottish Gaelic speakers
Scottish Gaelic placenames in Canada.

A notable example of this phenomenon is Beinn Bhreagh, former home of Alexander Graham Bell.

- Ontario
  - Eglinton
  - Fergus
  - Glencoe
  - Hamilton
  - Port Elgin
  - Tobermory
  - Wallaceburg (William Wallace)
- Prince Edward Island
  - New Glasgow

== Chile ==
- Alejandro Selkirk Island (Juan Fernández Islands, named for Alexander Selkirk)
- Villa Cameron
- Cochrane, Chile
- Gordon Island
- Lennox and Picton - Picton allegedly from "Pict", Lennox from the area north of Glasgow

== Dominica ==
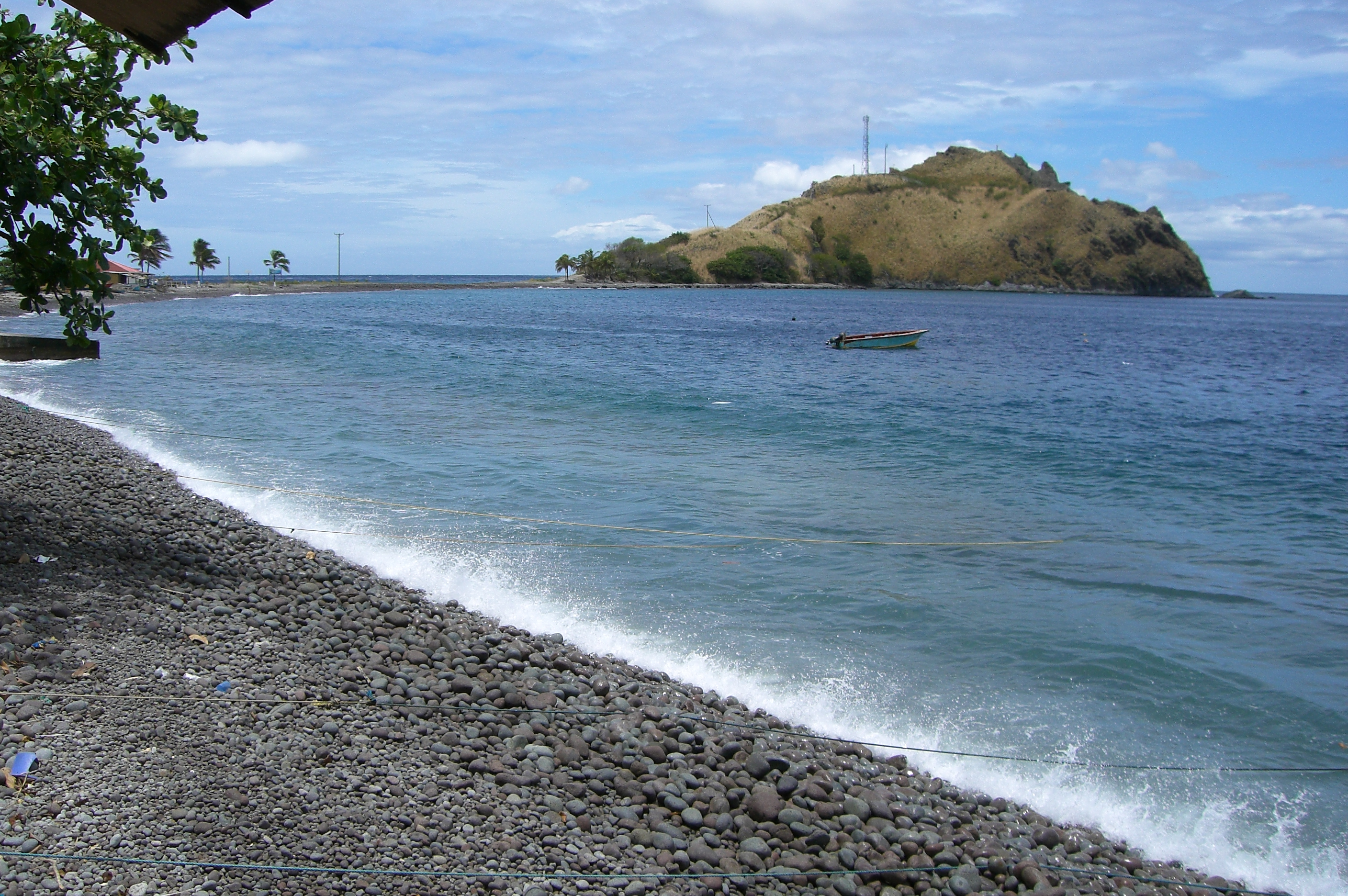
Scott's Head, Dominica

- Scotts Head, Dominica
- Scott's Head Village

== England ==
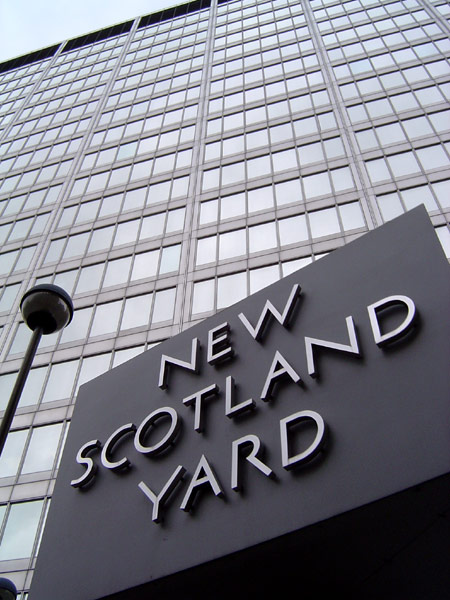
New Scotland Yard, London

- Crawford, Lancashire, a hamlet near Rainford
- Scotch Corner
- Scotland Yard (London)
- Telford (named after Scottish engineer)

== Falkland Islands ==
Map of the Falkland Islands

- Douglas

Note: The Falkland Islands derive their English language name from Falkland Sound. This was named for Anthony Cary, 5th Viscount of Falkland, who in turn took his title from Falkland Palace. See also West Falkland and East Falkland, the two main islands. Stanley is a location in Scotland, but the Falkland town is named after Edward Smith-Stanley, 14th Earl of Derby.

Brenton Loch (inlet) and Loch Head Pond are also rare examples of the Scottish word "loch" being applied to bodies of water outside Europe.

== Hong Kong ==
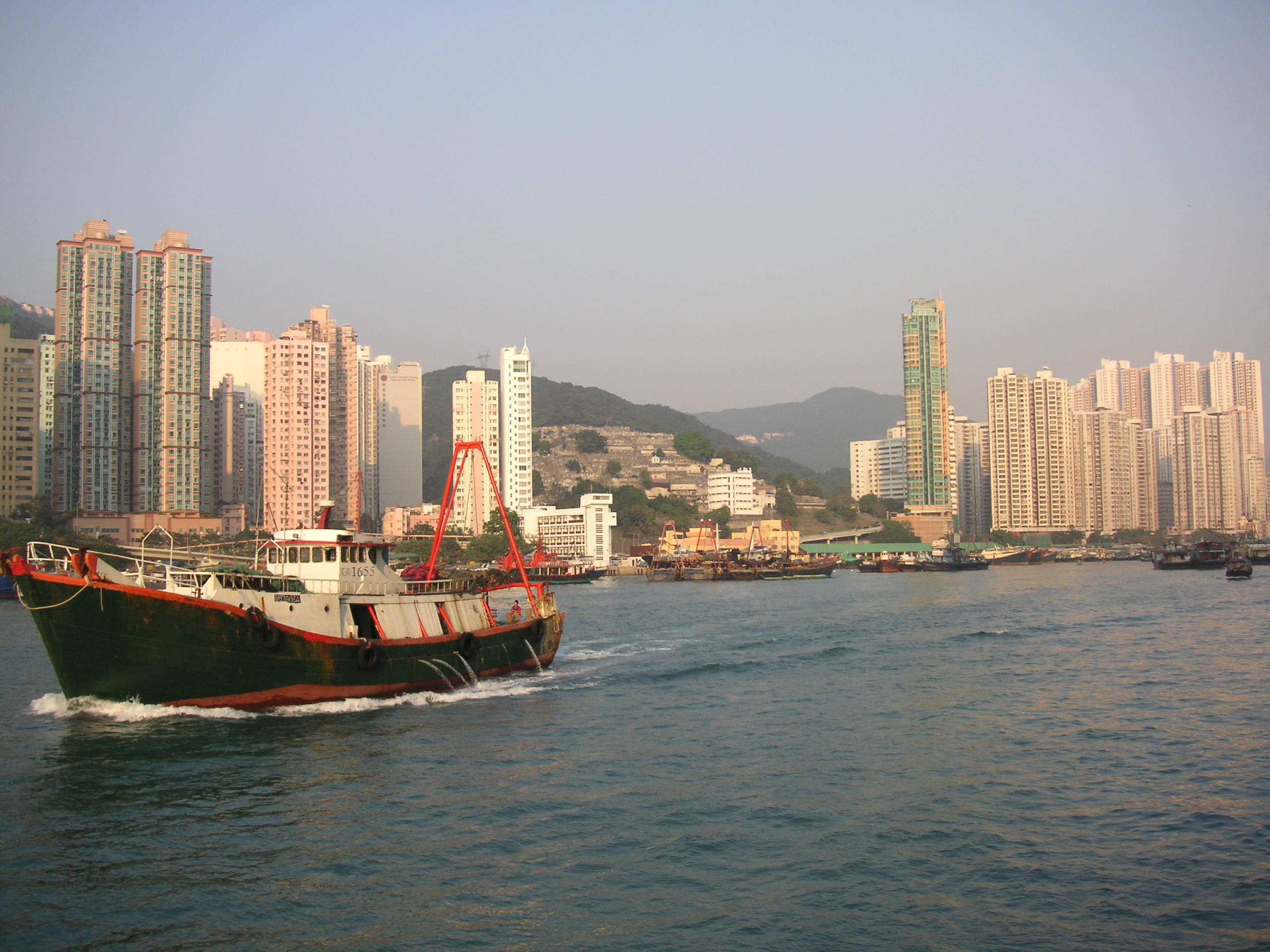
Aberdeen Harbour, Hong Kong

- Aberdeen Harbour
- Aberdeen Street
- Arbuthnot Road
- Argyle Street
- Arran Street
- Berwick Street
- Braemar Hill
- Bute Street
- Dumbarton Road
- Dunbar Road
- Dundas Street
- Edinburgh Place
- Elgin Street
- Fife Street
- Forfar Road
- Gullane Road
- Grampian Road
- Inverness Road
- Jardine's Lookout (William Jardine)
- Lomond Road
- Moray Road
- Pentland Street
- Perth Street
- Piper's Hill
- Renfrew Road
- Selkirk Road
- Stirling Road
- Sutherland Street
- Tweed Street
- Zetland Street

== India ==
- Port Blair (Andaman Islands, named after Archibald Blair)
- McLeod Ganj was named after Sir Donald Friell McLeod, a Lieutenant Governor of Punjab
- Dalhousie, India, a town in Himachal Pradesh, named after Lord Dalhousie (1st Marquess of Dalhousie), Governor-General of India (1848–1856)

== Italy ==
- Sant'Andrea degli Scozzesi

== Indonesia ==
- Jawa Timur (East Java)
  - Glenmore (fr:Glenmore (Indonésie), id:Glenmore, Banyuwangi) - From a Gaelic placename both in Mull and Lismore, it was named by Scottish Highland soldiers serving in the Dutch East India Company of the 18th Century who were garrisoned in the area near Mount Raung and who eventually married locally and settled down.

== Ireland ==
Because Scotland and Ireland have their own Gaelic languages, many of the same placename elements can be found in both countries. However, during the Ulster Plantations, Scottish settlers from the Lowlands who were mostly of Anglo-Saxon stock have left their mark with some place names in Ulster which are distinct to Ireland's predominantly Celtic placenames.

- Bridge End (Donegal)
- Burnfoot (Donegal)
- Burt (Donegal)
- Caledon, County Tyrone from Caledonia
- Crawfordsburn (Down)
- Drumcairn (Donegal)
- Inch (Donegal)
- Scotch Quay (Waterford)
- St. Johnston (Donegal)
- Manorcunningham (Donegal)
- Newtown Cunningham (Donegal)
- Newtownstewart (Lislas)
- Stewartstown (an Chraobh)

== Jamaica ==
- Aberdeen
- Alva
- Berwick Castle
- Clydesdale
- Culloden (two places)
- Dundee
- Elderslie
- Elgin Town (two places)
- Farquhar's Beach
- Glasgow
- Inverness
- Kilmarnoch (sic - from Kilmarnock)
- Suburbs of Kingston (possibly not itself a Scottish name)
  - Balmagie
  - Braeton
  - Dunrobin
  - Pitcairn Valley
  - Portmore
  - Sterling Castle (Stirling Castle)
- Knapdale
- Montego Bay suburbs include Dunbar Pen and Glendevon.
- Perth Town
- Roxborough
- Stewart Town
- Tweedside

== Kerguelen Islands ==
- McMurdo Island/Ile McMurdo
- Ile Murray

== Malawi ==
- Blantyre
- Cape Maclear

== Malaysia ==
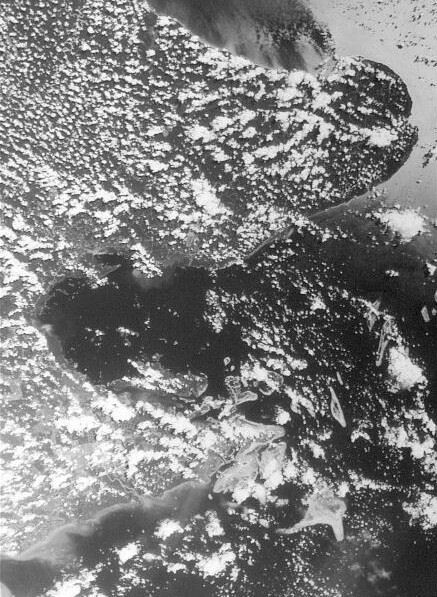
Satellite image of Darvel Bay, 27 July 1980

- Darvel Bay
- Cameron Highlands
- Fraser's Hill
- Port Dickson
- Kinta Kellas, Batu Gajah

== Isle of Man ==
- Atholl Street (financial district of Douglas. Douglas while also a Scottish name, is not of Scottish origin in this case)
- St Ninian's Crossroads (Saint Ninian)

The Isle of Man like Ireland also has its own Gaelic language meaning that Scottish placename elements such as "glen" (Manx: "glione") frequently turn up there, e.g. Sulby Glen, but these are indigenous.

== New Caledonia ==
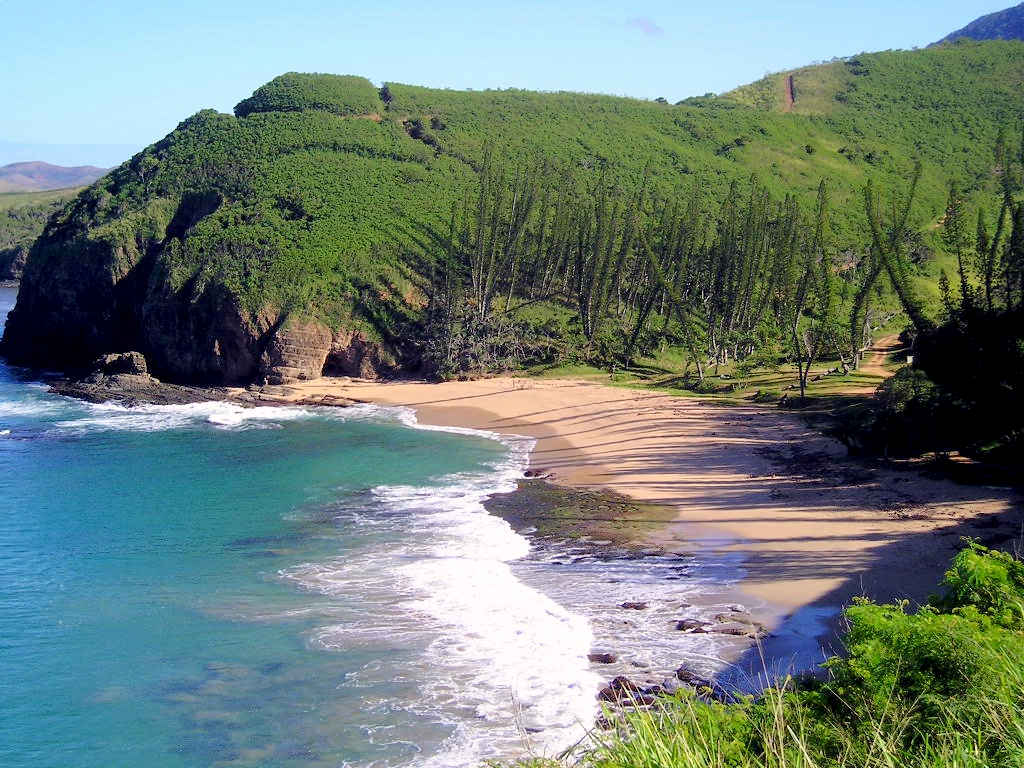
"Baie des Tortues" (Turtle Bay) near "La roche percée" (Pierced Rock) at Bourail in New Caledonia

- New Caledonia

== New Zealand ==
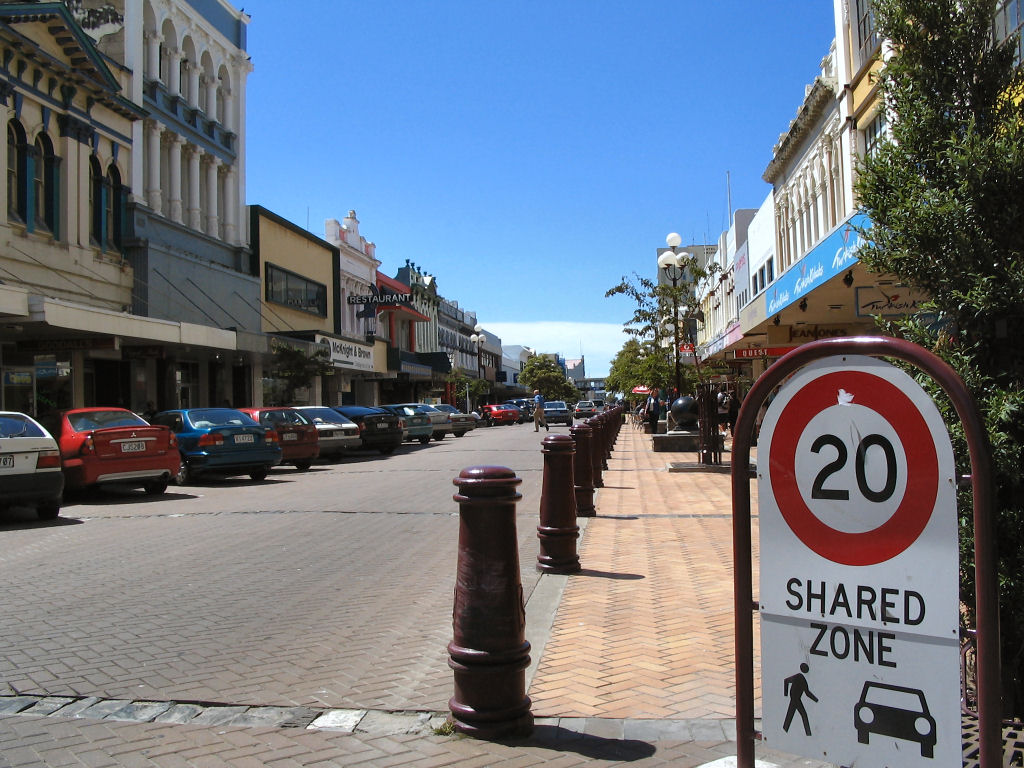
Cnr of Esk and Dee Streets, looking up Esk st, one of the main shopping streets of Invercargill.

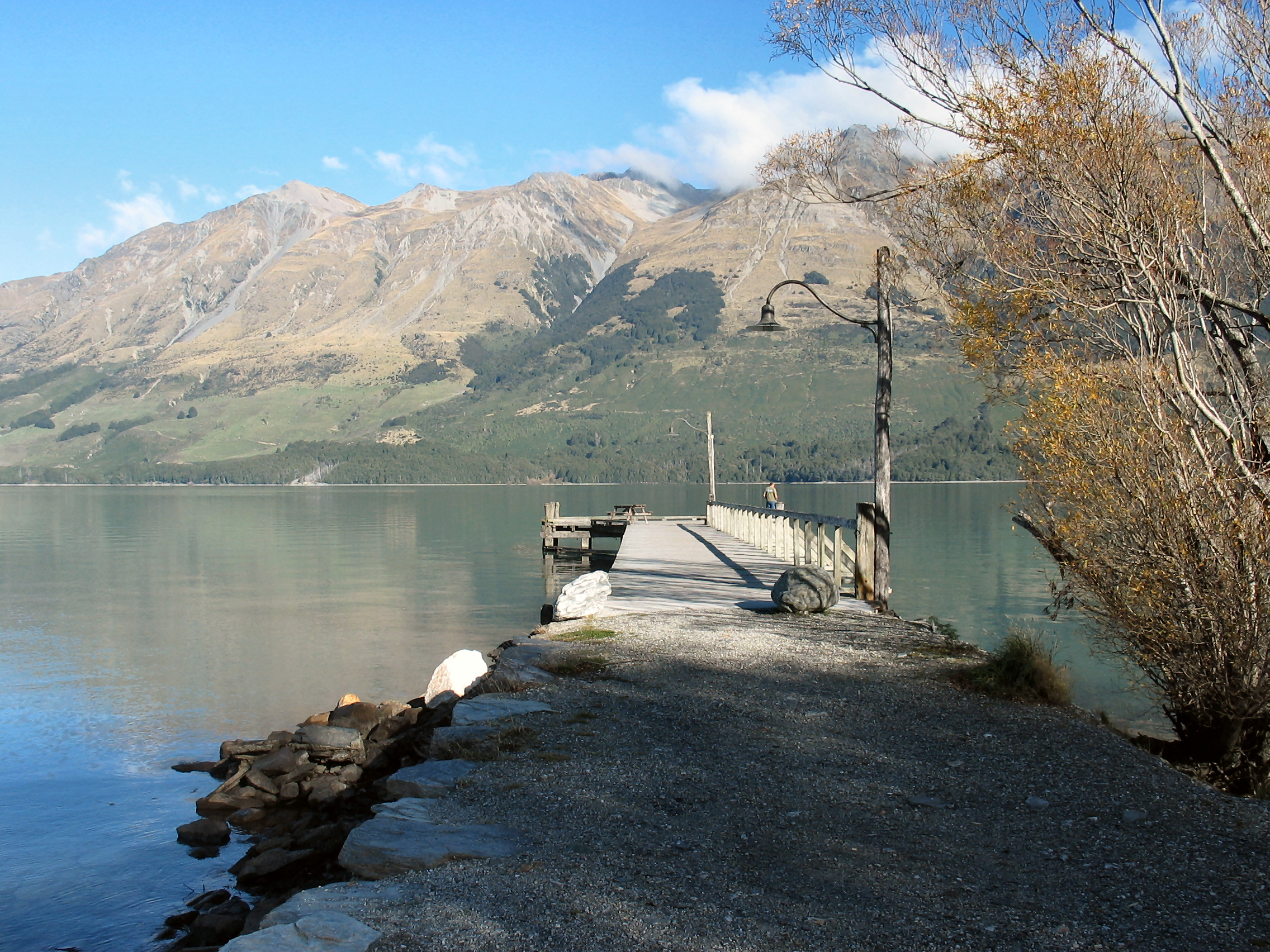
Looking at Lake Wakatipu from Glenorchy

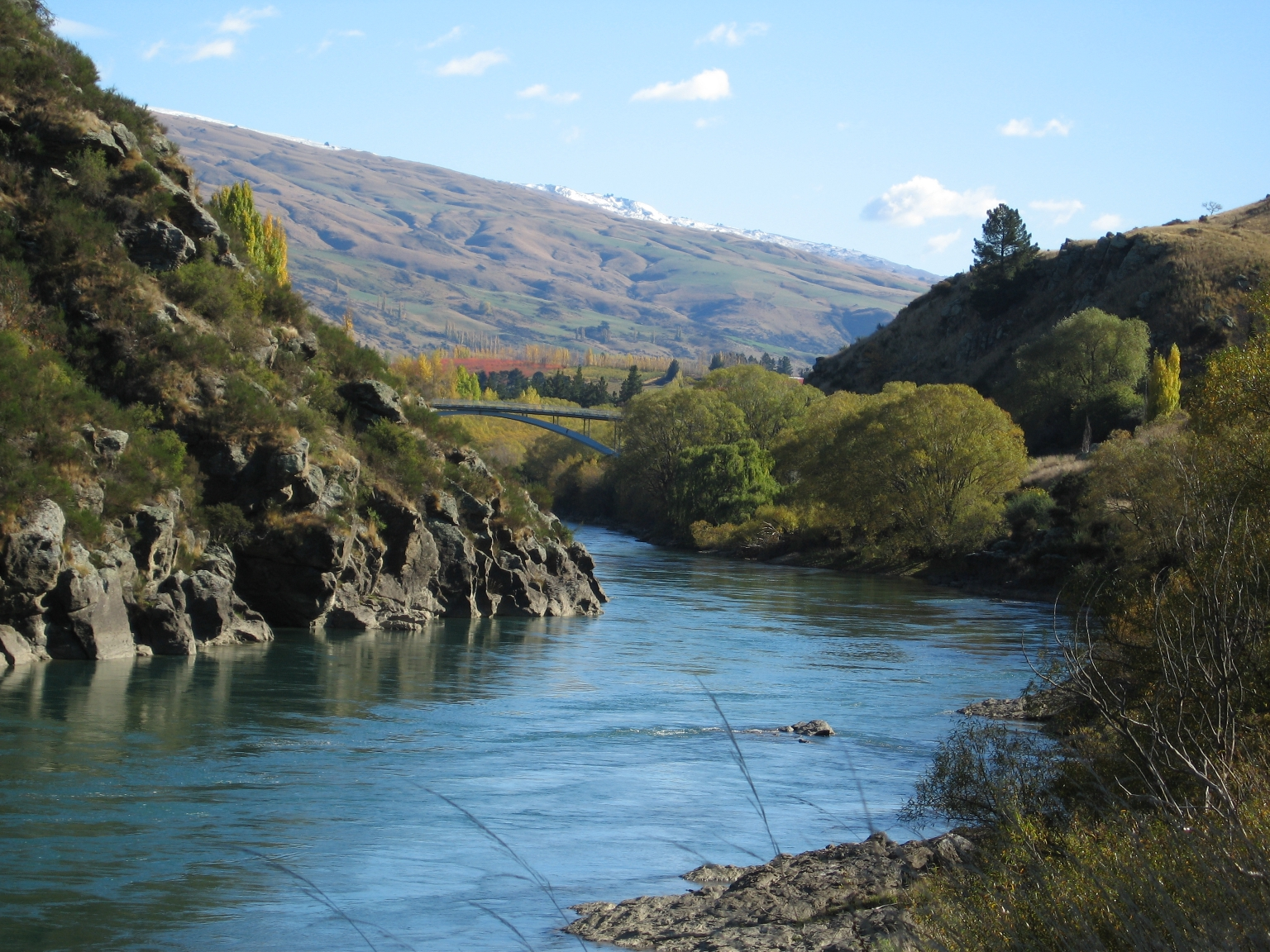
View of the Clutha River towards Roxburgh Bridge.

- North Island
  - Hamilton, New Zealand
  - Napier, New Zealand
- South Island and Stewart Island / Rakiura
  - Balclutha - from the Gaelic for 'Clydetown' (Baile Chluaidh)
  - Dunedin, from Dun Eideann, Scottish Gaelic for Edinburgh
  - Lammerlaw Range (mountains)
  - The Grampians (mountains)
  - Oban, largest settlement in Stewart Island / Rakiura
  - Ulva Island
  - Water of Leith (river)

The South Island also contains the Strath-Taieri and the Ben Ohau Range of mountains, both combining Scots Gaelic and Māori origins. Invercargill has the appearance of a Scottish name, since it combines the Scottish prefix "Inver" (Inbhir), meaning a river's mouth, with "Cargill", the name of a leading early settler, who was born in Scotland. Invercargill's main streets are named after Scottish rivers (Dee, Tay, Spey, Esk, Don, Doon, Clyde, etc.), and many places in Dunedin have names mirroring those in Edinburgh. Inchbonnie is a hybrid of Lowland Scots and Scottish Gaelic

== Norway ==
- Hjeltefjorden, meaning "Shetland Fjord"

== Panama ==
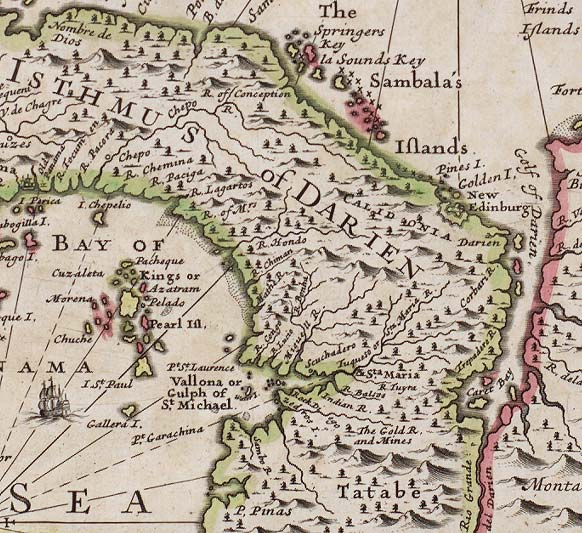
The Scottish Colony in Panama

Due to the Darién scheme, the Caribbean coast of Panama has various names which refer to the Scottish presence. The colony was called "New Caledonia", the settlement "New Edinburgh", the fort "Fort St Andrew" and the bay near it "Caledonia Bay". These names are defunct, although references to the Scottish settlers remain in some of the Spanish language names of the region.

== Pitcairn Islands ==
- Pitcairn
- Henderson Island (Scottish surname)

== Seychelles ==
- Farquhar Group and Farquhar Atoll

== South Africa ==
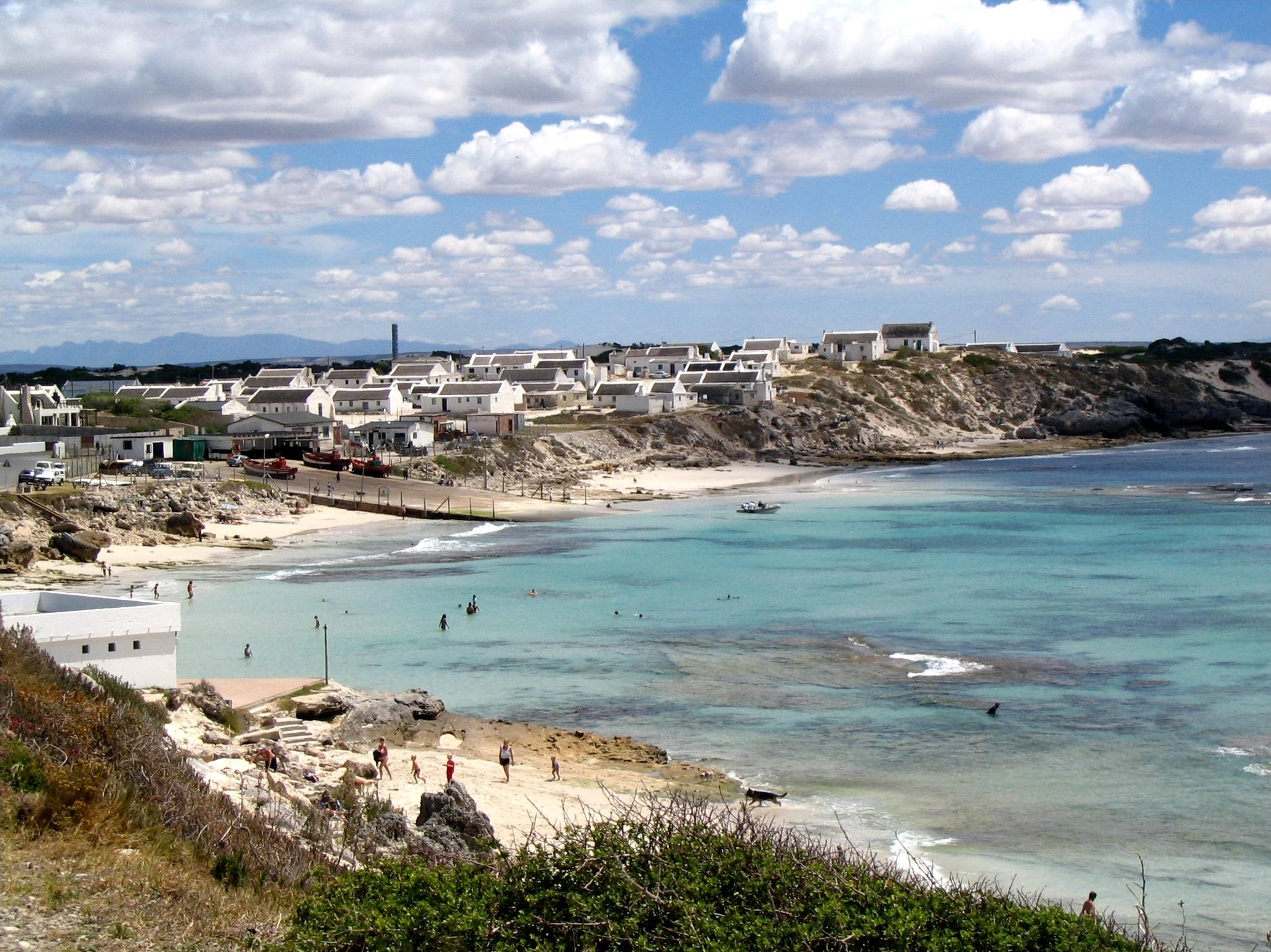
Arniston, South Africa's typical fisherman houses

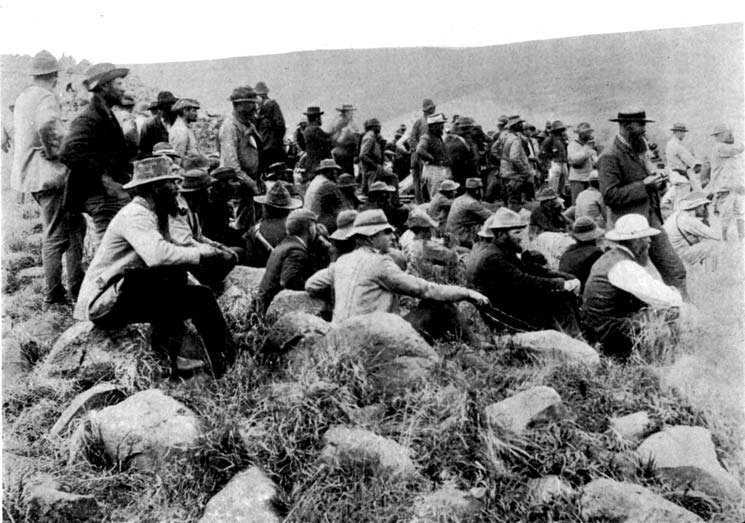
Boers watch the fighting at Dundee in 1899

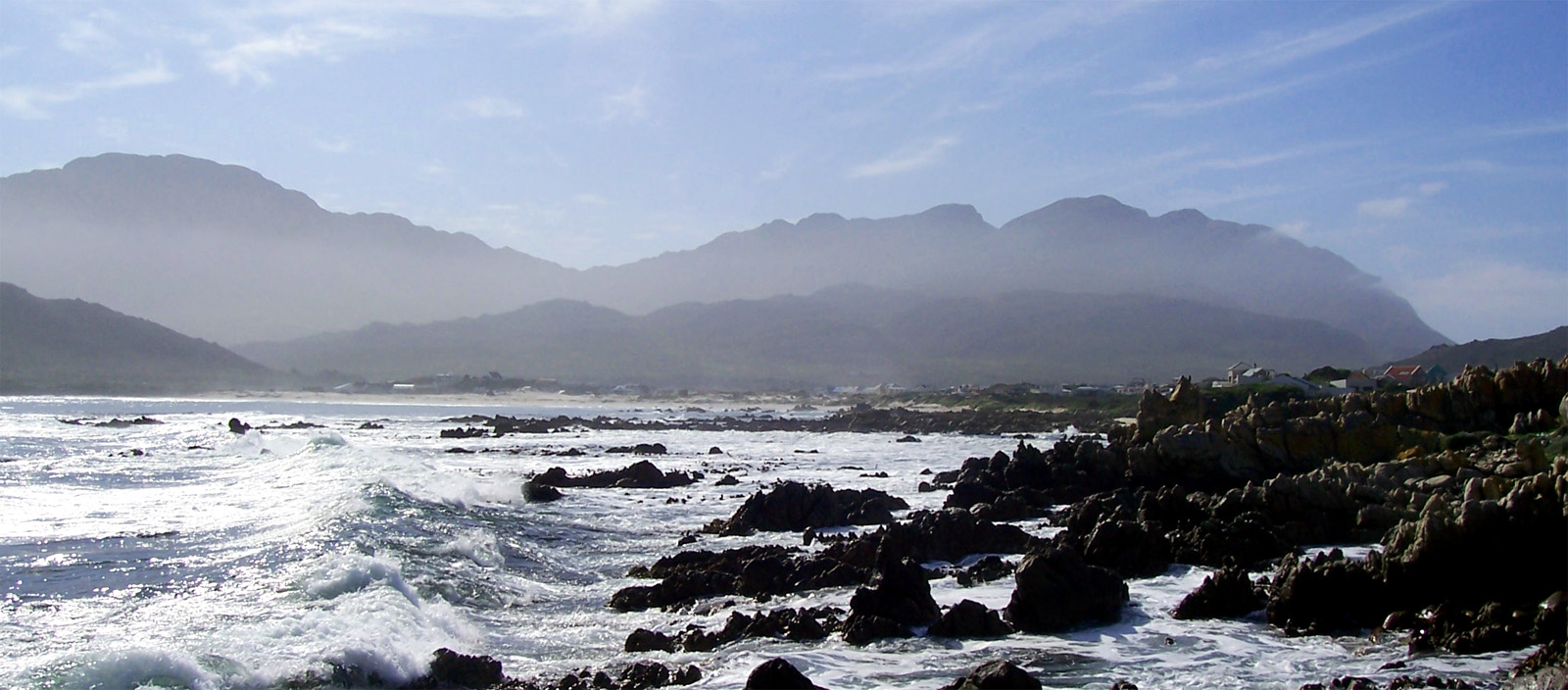
Pringle Bay

- Eastern Cape
  - Aberdeen
  - Albany, South Africa (named after Albany, New York, in turn from an old name for Scotland, Alba)
  - Cathcart (George Cathcart)
  - Grahamstown (John Graham (British Army officer))
- KwaZulu-Natal (native)
  - Balgowan
  - Dundee
  - Glencoe
  - Scottburgh
- Gauteng (native)
  - Suburbs of Johannesburg
    - Abbotsford
    - Argyll
    - Balmoral
    - Birnam
    - Blairgowrie
    - Brushwood Haugh (Haugh being a Lowland Scots word for meadow)
    - Buccleuch
    - Dunkeld
    - Dunnotar
    - Dunvegan
    - Glen Atholl
    - Glen Esk
    - Heriotdale
    - Kelvin
    - Melrose
    - Moffat View
    - Strathavon
    - Wattville
- Mpumalanga
  - Balfour (formerly "McHattiesburg")
- North West Province
  - Orkney
- Northern Cape
  - Alexander Bay (James Edward Alexander)
  - Campbell
  - Sutherland
- Western Cape
  - Arniston (Arniston, Midlothian)
  - Clanwilliam
  - Elgin
  - Gordon's Bay
  - McGregor
  - Napier
  - Pringle Bay
  - Robertson (Rev William Robertson)
  - Suburbs of Cape Town
    - Airlie
    - Balvenie
    - Bellville (after Charles Davidson Bell, Surveyor-General of the Cape from 1848 to 1872)
    - Bonnie Brook (Burn is the normal form in Scotland)
    - Clunie
    - Crawford
    - Crofters' Valley
    - Dunoon
    - Dunrobin
    - Glencairn
    - Kelvingrove
    - Lochiel
    - Schotsche Kloof - Afrikaans for "Scottish Ravine".
    - St Kilda
    - The Glen
  - Finlay's Point
  - Murray's Bay, on Robbin Island, named after John Murray, a Scottish whaler

== South Georgia ==
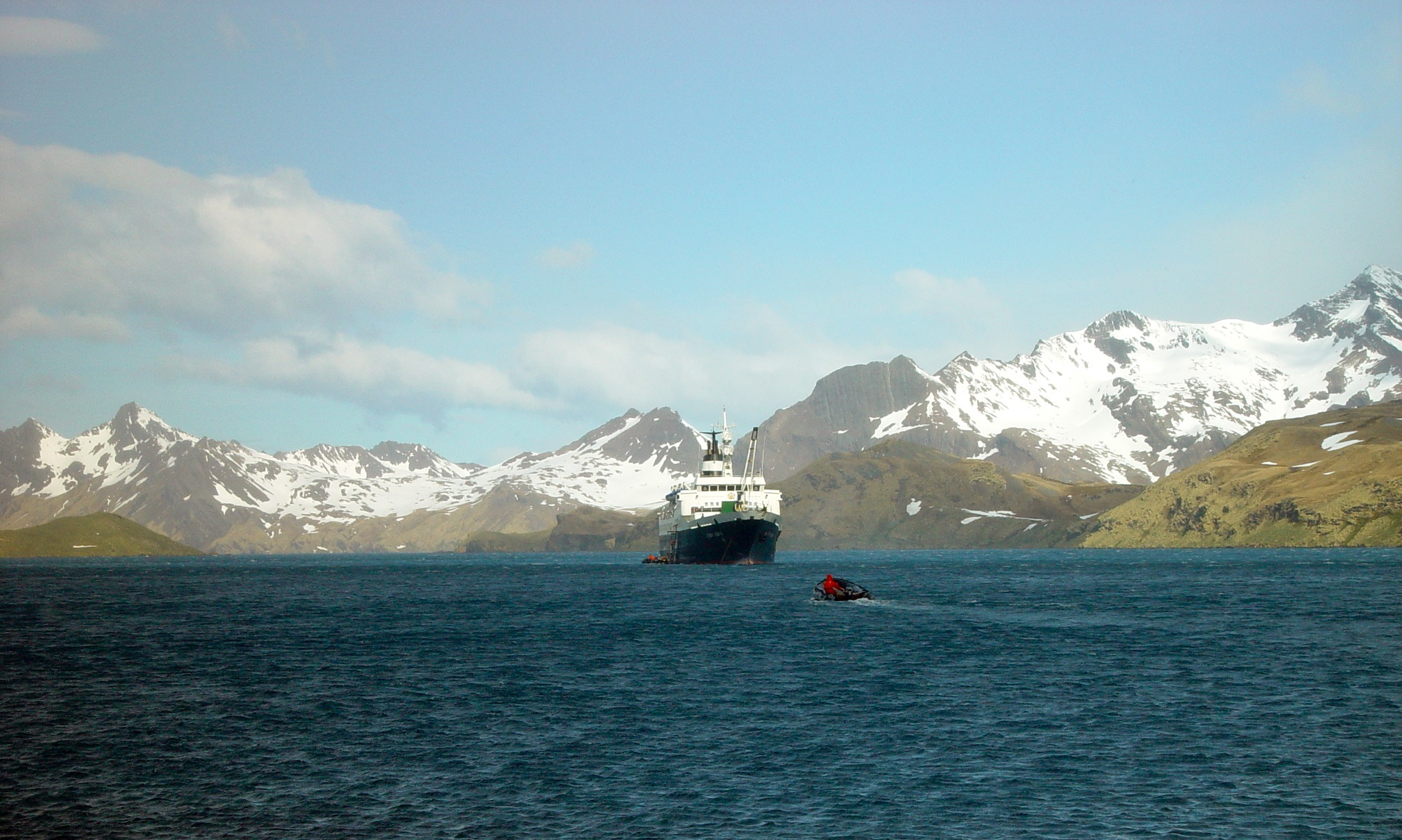
Stromness Bay, South Georgia

- Allardyce Range
- Geikie Glacier (Archibald Geikie)
- Leith Harbour (former whaling base)
- Lyell Glacier, South Georgia (Charles Lyell)
- McNish Island (Harry McNish)
- Mount Carse
- Mount Cunningham (John C. Cunningham)
- Ross Glacier
- St Andrews Bay
- Stromness and Stromness Bay
- Scotia Arc
- Scotia Sea

== Sri Lanka ==
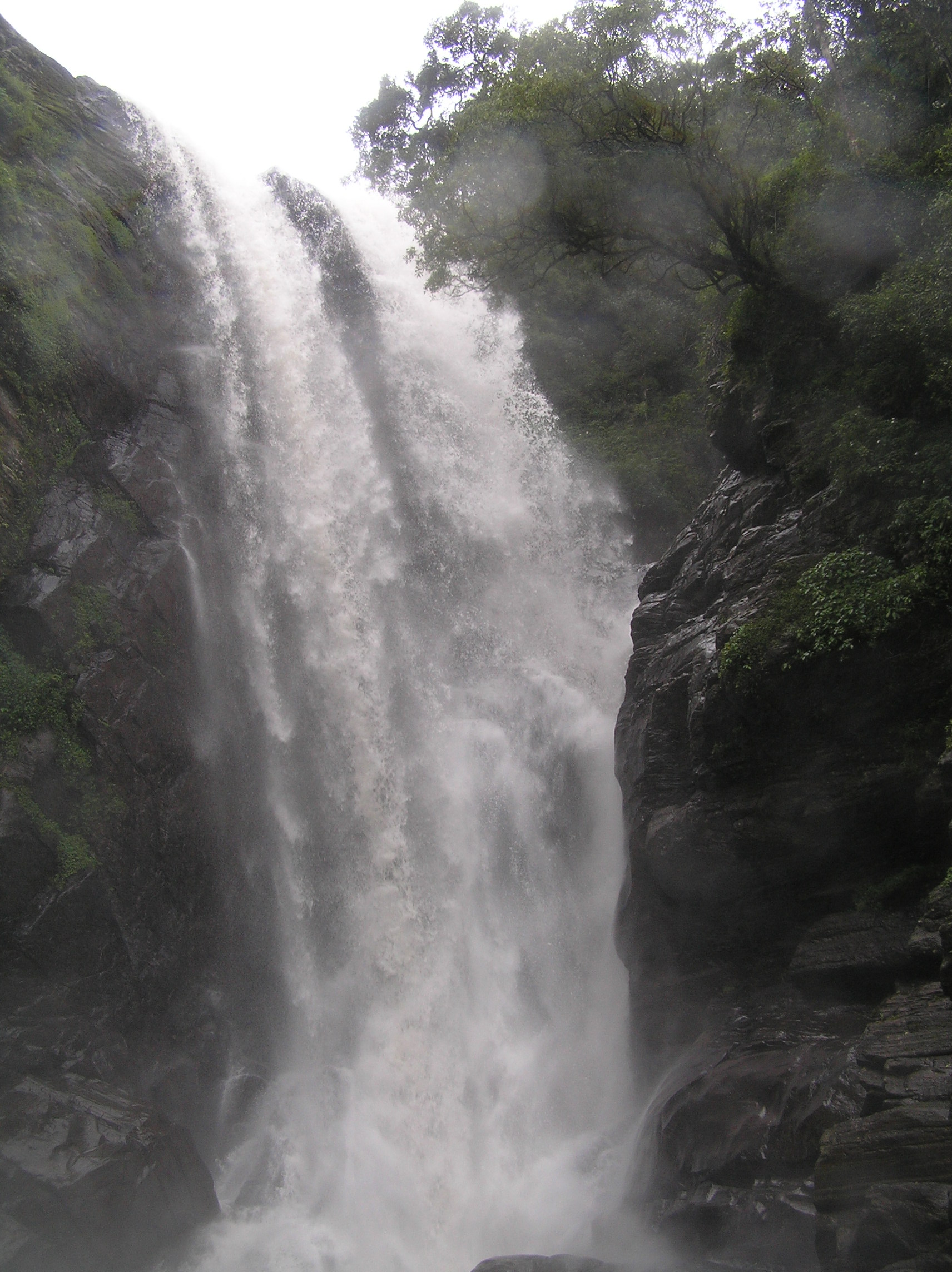
Elgin Falls, Sri Lanka

- Aberdeen Falls
- Balmoral
- Caledonia
- Dalhousie
- Elgin Falls
- Glasgow
- Highland
- Iona
- Macduff
- Maitland Crescent
- St. Andrew's
- Sanquhar

== Sweden ==
- Inverness, a residential area in Danderyd Municipality, Stockholm

== Tristan da Cunha ==
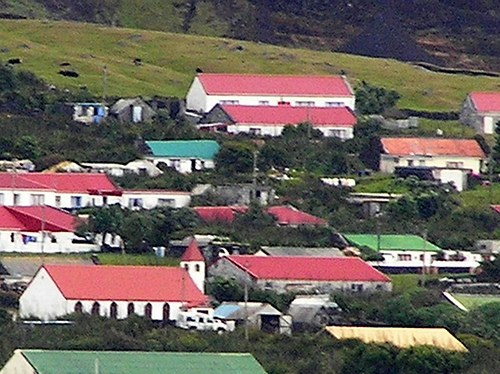
Edinburgh of the Seven Seas

- Edinburgh of the Seven Seas

== Trinidad and Tobago ==
- [Glencoe] (Suburb of Port of Spain)
- Caledonia Island and Craig Island (joined by a reef)
- Culloden Bay
- Mount Irvine
- Roxburgh
- Speyside

== Turks and Caicos Islands ==
- Cockburn Harbour (South Caicos)

== United States ==
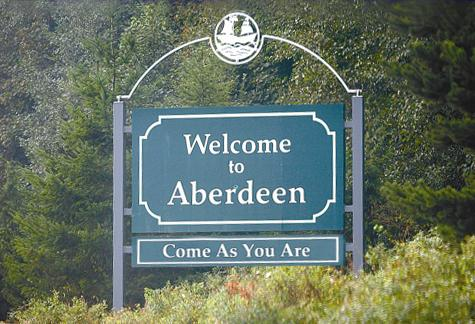
Tribute to Kurt Cobain in Aberdeen, Washington State.

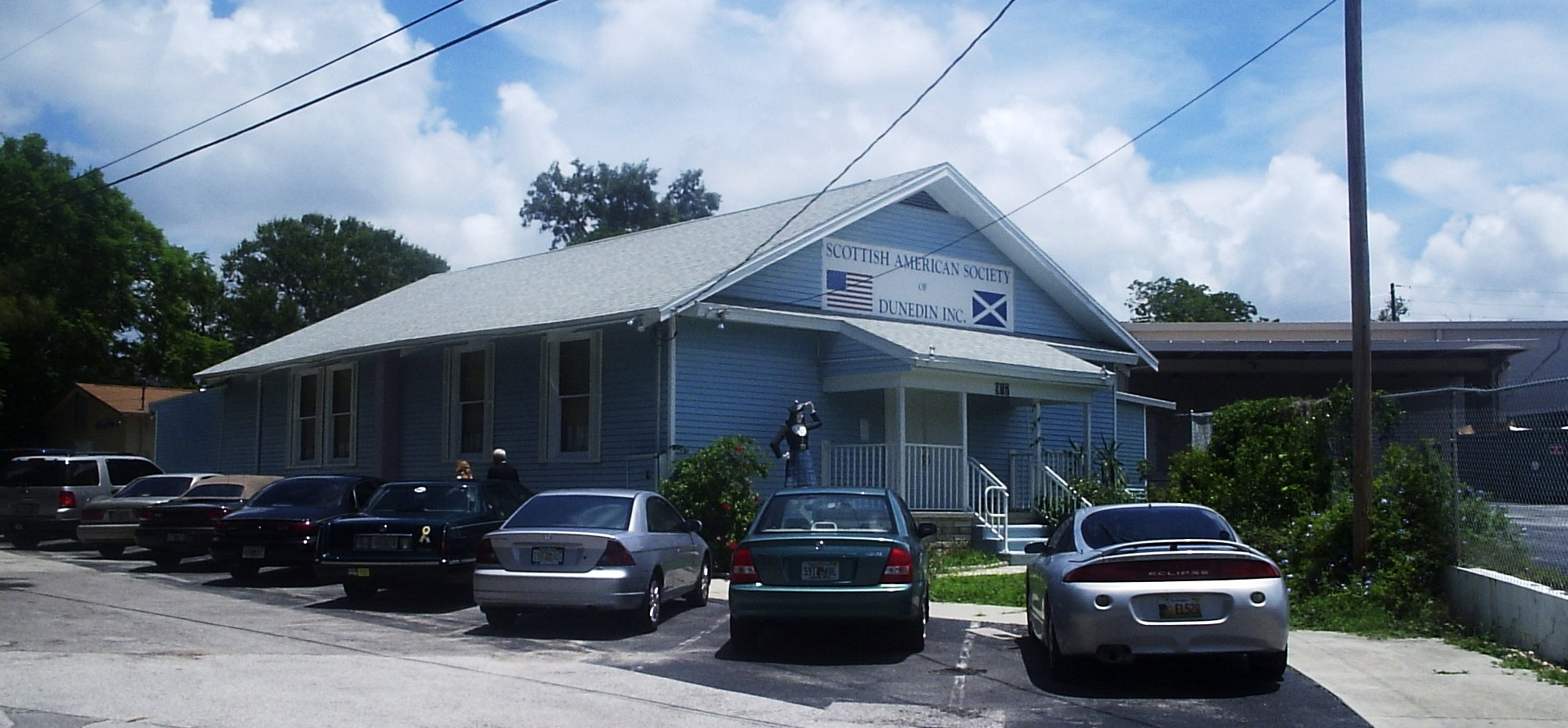
Dunedin's Scottish-American Society maintains Dunedin's Scottish heritage.

== Vanuatu ==
- New Hebrides

== Wales ==
- Butetown ("Tiger Bay"), in Cardiff (named after the Marquess of Bute)
- Wattstown (Cwtch)

== Zambia ==
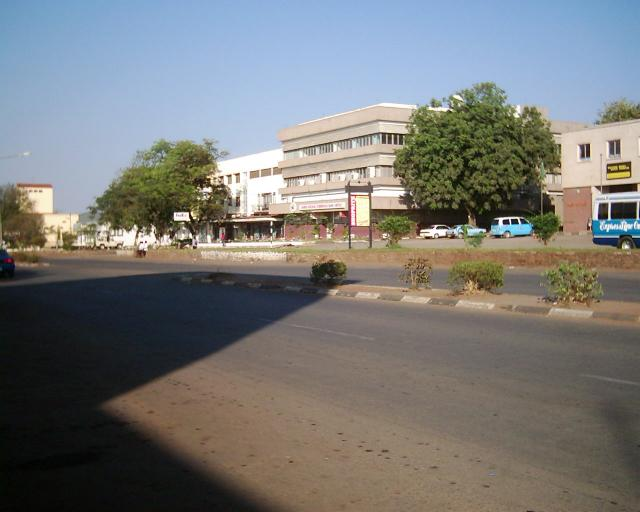
Livingstone, Zambia

- Livingstone, Zambia (David Livingstone)

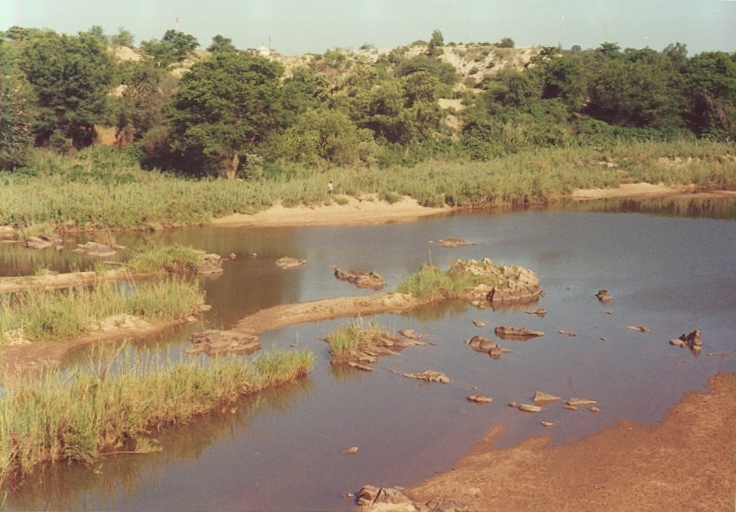
Mzingwane River at West Nicholson, Zimbabwe

== Zimbabwe ==
- Bannockburn
- Craigmore, Zimbabwe
- Glendale, Zimbabwe
- West Nicholson
- Bulawayo is a native name, but 38 of the 156 suburbs have names of some kind of Scottish origin.
  - Barbourfields
  - Burnside
  - Douglasdale
  - Glencoe
  - Glengarry
  - Kelvin, Kelvin East, Kelvin North and Kelvin West (River Kelvin)
  - Lochview - in reference to Lakeside Dam.
  - Montrose Old Church
  - Morningside
  - Paddonhurst
  - Southdale (Shetland Islands).
- Harare also a native name - suburbs include
  - Ardbennie
  - Braeside
  - Glen Lorne
  - Lochinvar
  - Strathaven

Some post-colonial renaming has taken place, e.g. Lake Chivero was formerly known as Lake McIlwaine. It is uncertain whether the "Glen" of Glen Norah is Scottish inspired.

== Outer space ==
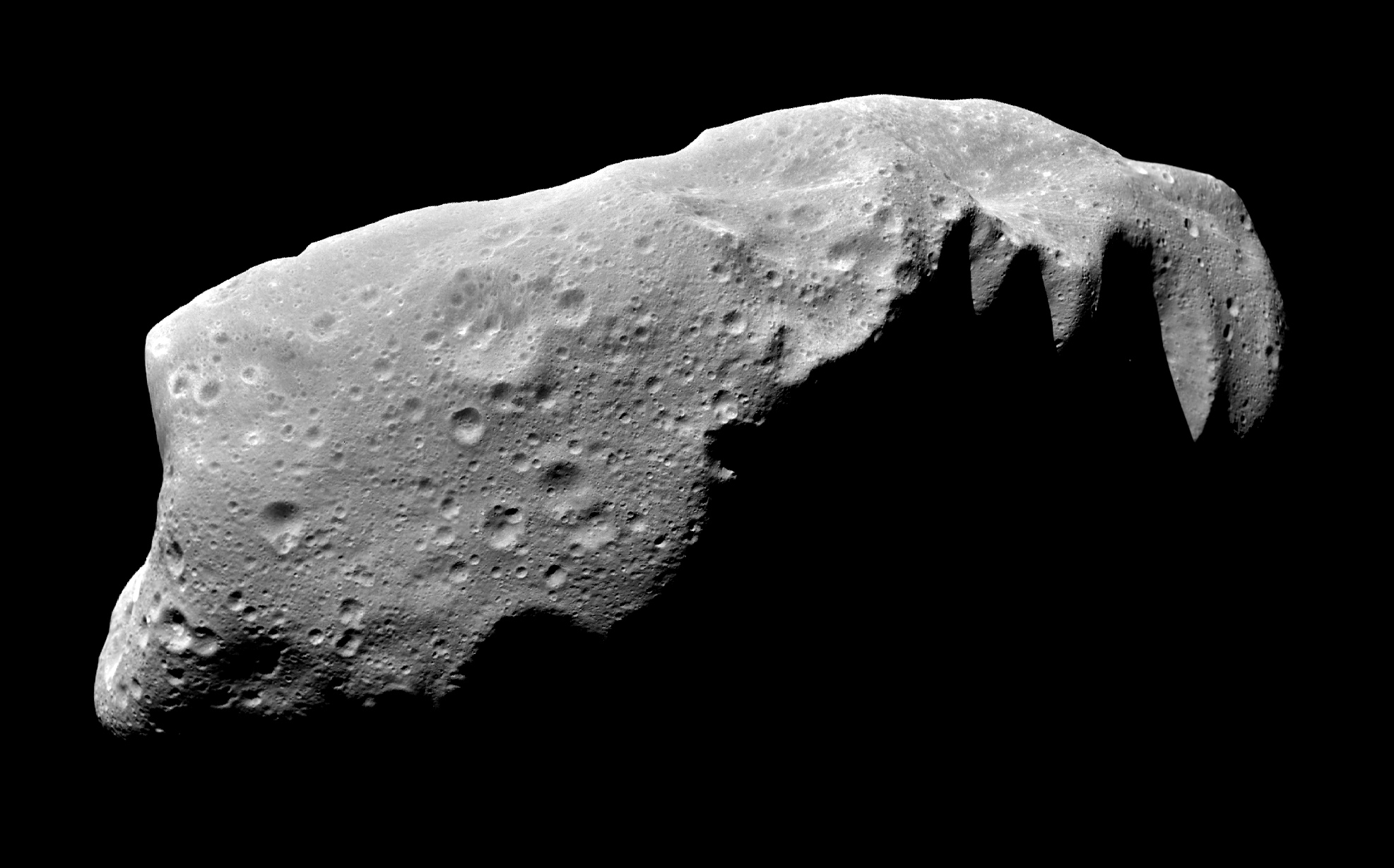
Asteroid 243 Ida which includes a feature named after Fingal's Cave

- The Moon
  - Dorsa Geikie, a wrinkle ridge system on the Moon, is named after Sir Archibald Geikie.
- Europa
  - Arran Chaos
  - Callanish
  - Tormsdale (Tormsdale, Caithness)
- Martian craters
  - Ayr
  - Balvicar
  - Banff
  - Darvel
  - Doon
  - Echt
- 253 Mathilde (asteroid)
  - Clackmannan
- 243 Ida (asteroid)
  - Fingal (features are named after caves, in this case Fingal's Cave on Staffa)
