= Names of Sri Lanka =

Sri Lanka (Sinhala: ශ්‍රී ලංකා, romanized: Śrī Lankā; Tamil: சிறி லங்கா / இலங்கை, romanized: Ilaṅkai), officially the Democratic Socialist Republic of Sri Lanka, is an island country in the northern Indian Ocean which has been known under various names over time.

In the 19th century, it was said that the oldest recorded name of Sri Lanka was Tamraparni (= Taprobane). Sri Lanka was also known in Greek sources as Simoundou and Salike in the 1st and 2nd centuries AD, which some scholars have derived from the Pali Sihalam (or Simhalam, Sihalan, Sihala); which became Saylan from the 9th century, and transcribed as Ceilão by the Portuguese in 1505; and later as Ceylon in English. Ceylon was used until it was replaced by Sri Lanka in 1972; the honorific Sri has been added to Lanka, a place mentioned in ancient texts and assumed to refer to the country between the 10th and the 12th centuries CE.

Other ancient names used to refer to Sri Lanka included Serendip in Arabic, Persian, Turkic (Serendib/Särändib) (written as: سرندیپ) and Eelam in Tamil.

== Taprobana, Tamraparni ==
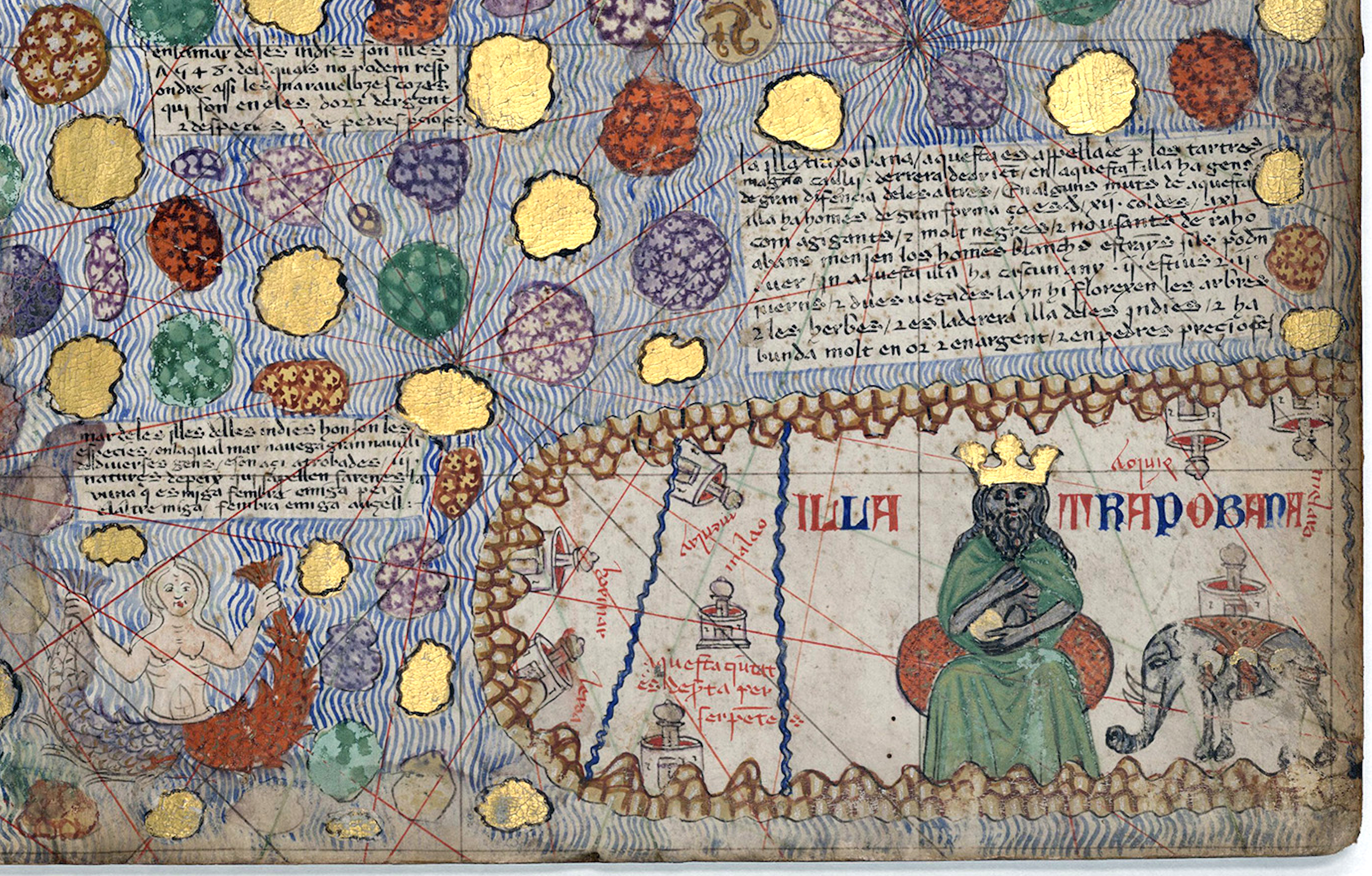
Taprobane in the Catalan Atlas (1375): "Illa Trapobana"

Tamraparni is said to be the oldest recorded name of Sri Lanka, for example as asserted by Robert Caldwell. According to some legends, Tamraparni is the name given by Prince Vijaya when he arrived on the island. The word can be translated as "copper-coloured leaf", from the words Thamiram (copper in Sanskrit) and Varni (colour). Another scholar states that Tamara means red and parani means tree, therefore it could mean "tree with red leaves". Tamraparni is also a name of Tirunelveli, the capital of the Pandyan kingdom in Tamil Nadu. The name was adopted in Pali as Tambaparni.

The name was adopted into Greek as Taprobana, used by Megasthenes in the 4th century BC. The Greek name was adopted in medieval Irish (Lebor Gabála Érenn) as Deprofane (Recension 2) and Tibra Faine (Recension 3), off the coast of India, supposedly one of the countries where the Milesians / Gaels, ancestors of today's Irish, had sojourned in their previous migrations.

The name remained in use in early modern Europe, alongside the Persianate Serendip, with Traprobana mentioned in the first strophe of the Portuguese national epic poem Os Lusíadas by Luís de Camões.

John Milton borrowed this for his epic poem Paradise Lost and Miguel de Cervantes mentions a fantastic Trapobana in Don Quixote.

Some sources also identify Taprobane with Sumatra.

== Salai, Sinhala, Sielediba ==
In the 2nd century CE, Ptolemy called the inhabitants of the island Salai. McCrindle derives Salai from Sihalam (pronounced Silam).

In the Dīpavaṃsa (the Buddhist oldest historical record of Sri Lanka, 3rd to 4th century CE), it is written that "The island of Lanka was formerly called Sihala". Sihala means lion's abode (from Sinha = lion)

In Chinese sources, the Buddhist monk Faxian (3rd and 4th century CE) called the island the Lion Kingdom (師子國) or Sinhala, while the 7th century monk Yijing also used the term Lion country (師子洲).

Xuanzang called the country Sēngjiāluó (僧伽羅) for Sinhala in Records of the Western Regions. Léngjiā (楞伽) for Lanka was also used.

Cosmas Indicopleustes (6th century CE) named it Σιελεδίβα : Sielediba or SieleDiva (Diva, Dwipa meaning Island). McCrindle also derives Siele from Sihalam. In the 9th century, the forms Sailan and Saylan were used.

== From the 9th to the 15th century CE: Sailan, Saylan, Silan, Seilan ==
From Silam came the names:

- Sailan and Saylan, mentioned in the 9th century CE,
- Ilam in Tamil,
- Siyalan and Silan (mentioned in the 10th century CE), etc.

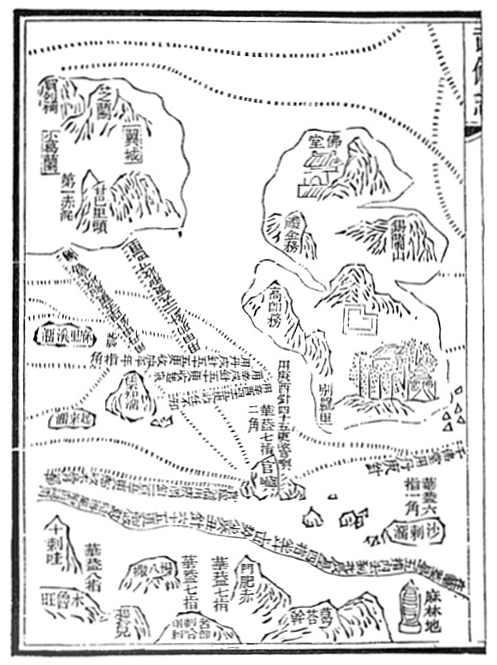
The island of Sri Lanka as depicted in the Mao Kun map

Marco Polo, in 1298 CE, names it Seilan. In the Chinese Mao Kun map (17th century but believed to date from the early 15th century), the name appears as Xilan (锡闌), also Xilan (細蘭) in the 13th century Chinese work Zhu Fan Zhi.

During the 13th and 14th centuries, the forms Sailan, Sílán, Sillan, and Seyllan, were used.

== From the 16th century: Ceilão, Lanka; Zeylan, Ceylon ==
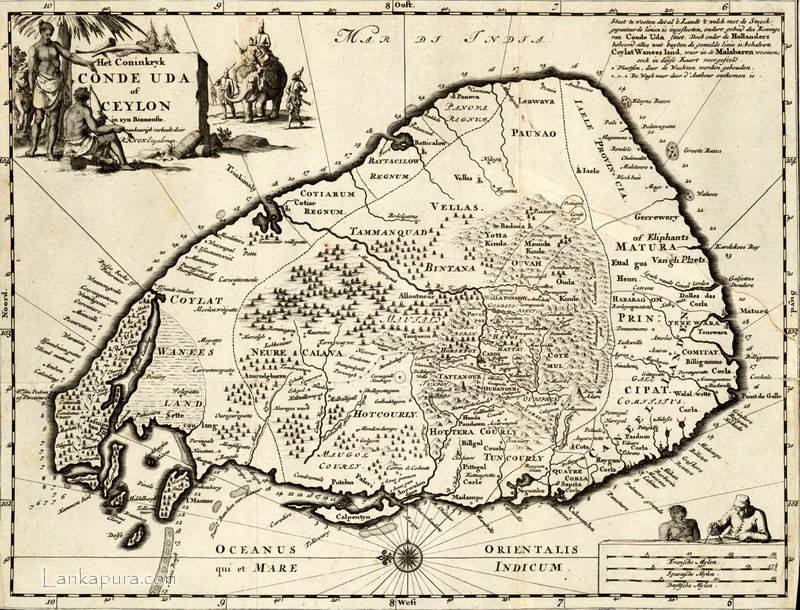
17th century English map of Ceylon, showing the kingdom of Candy Uda

With the Portuguese colonization in the 16th century, the original local names Silam, Sihala and Sailan were adopted as Ceilão in Portuguese (from 1505), and later as Zeilan or Zeylan in Dutch, and Ceylon in English. After independence in 1948, the name Ceylon was still used until 1972.

Lanka appears later and in parallel, between the 10th and the 12th centuries CE. The name Lanka, a Sanskrit word, comes from the Hindu text the Ramayana, where Lanka is the abode of King Ravana.

The Ramayana Lanka began to be considered as the present-day Sri Lanka between the 10th and the 12th centuries CE. Then from the 16th century, in opposition to colonization, the assertion that the Ramayana Lanka was the present-day Sri Lanka became part of the Sinhalese Buddhist mythology, and started to be used by locals in opposition to the Portuguese colonial name Ceilão.

== Sri Lanka ==
The name of Sri Lanka was introduced by the Marxist Lanka Sama Samaja Party founded in 1935.

The Sanskrit honorific Sri was introduced in the name of the Sri Lanka Freedom Party (Sinhala: ශ්‍රී ලංකා නිදහස් පක්ෂය, romanized: Sri Lanka Nidahas Pakshaya) founded in 1952.

In 1972, the Republic of Sri Lanka was officially adopted as the country's name with the new constitution and changed to "Democratic Socialist Republic of Sri Lanka" in the constitution of 1978.

== Other names ==
=== Serendip ===
The names Serendip, Seren-dip, Sarandib or Sarandīp (written as: سرندیپ) are Persian and Arab or Hindustani names for Sri Lanka suggested to have been derived from the words Sinhala-dvipa (Sinhala Isle, dvipa or dipa means Island), or Suvarna-dvipa meaning "golden-isle". Another proposal suggested Cheran (a Tamil tribe) and tivu (island) as the origin. The English word "serendipity" was coined from Serendip.

=== Lakdiva ===
Another traditional Sinhala name for Sri Lanka was Lakdiva, with diva also meaning "island". A further traditional name is Lakbima. In both cases, Lak is derived from Lanka. The same name could have been adopted in Tamil as Ilangai; the Tamil language commonly adds "i" before initial "l".

=== Eelam ===
The earliest use of the word is found in a Tamil-Brahmi inscription as well as in the Sangam literature. The Tirupparankunram inscription found near Madurai in Tamil Nadu and dated on palaeographical grounds to the 1st century BCE, refers to a person as a householder from Eelam (Eela-kudumpikan).

The most favoured explanation derives it from a word for the spurge (palm tree), via the application to a caste of toddy-drawers, i.e. workers drawing the sap from palm trees for the production of palm wine. The name of the palm tree may conversely be derived from the name of the caste of toddy drawers, known as Eelavar, cognate with the name of Kerala, from the name of the Chera dynasty, via Cheralam, Chera, Sera and Kera.

The stem Eela is found in Prakrit inscriptions dated to 2nd century BC in Sri Lanka in personal names such as Eela-Vrata/Ela-Bharat and Eela-Naga. The meaning of Eela in these inscriptions is unknown although one could deduce that they are either from Eela a geographic location or were an ethnic group known as Eela. From the 19th century onwards, sources appeared in South India regarding a legendary origin for caste of toddy drawers known as Eelavar in the state of Kerala. These legends stated that Eelavar were originally from Eelam.

There have also been proposals of deriving Eelam from Simhala (comes from Elam, Ilam, Tamil, Helmand River, Himalayas). Robert Caldwell (1875), following Hermann Gundert, cited the word as an example of the omission of initial sibilants in the adoption of Indo-Aryan words into Dravidian languages. The University of Madras Tamil Lexicon, compiled between 1924 and 1936, follows this view. Peter Schalk (2004) has argued against this, showing that the application of Eelam in an ethnic sense arises only in the early modern period, and was limited to the caste of "toddy drawers" until the medieval period.

Thomas Burrow, in contrast, argued that the word was likely to have been Dravidian in origin, on the basis that Tamil and Malayalam "hardly ever substitute (Retroflex approximant) 'ɻ' peculiarly Dravidian sound, for Sanskrit -'l'-." He suggests that the name "Eelam" came from the Dravidian word "Eelam" (or Cilam) meaning "toddy", referring to the palm trees in Sri Lanka, and later absorbed into Indo-Aryan languages. This, he says, is also likely to have been the source for the Pali '"Sihala". The Dravidian Etymological Dictionary, which was jointly edited by Thomas Burrow and Murray Emeneau, marks the Indo-Aryan etymology with a question mark.

=== Suggested Biblical names ===
- Tarshish. According to James Emerson Tennent, Galle was said to be the ancient city of Tarshish where King Solomon drew ivory, peacocks, and others. Cinnamon was exported from Sri Lanka as early as 1400 BC and as the root of the word cinnamon itself is Hebrew, Galle may have been the port of entry for the spice.
- Ophir. There is a Jewish tradition that associates the land of Ophir with modern-day India and Sri Lanka. David ben Abraham al-Fasi, a 10th-century lexicographer, cites Ophir as Serendip, as the country was known to the Persians.

== See also ==
- Sri Lankan place name etymology

By ISO 639-3 code
Enter an ISO code to find the corresponding language article.
