= Locations in Sri Lanka with a Scottish name =

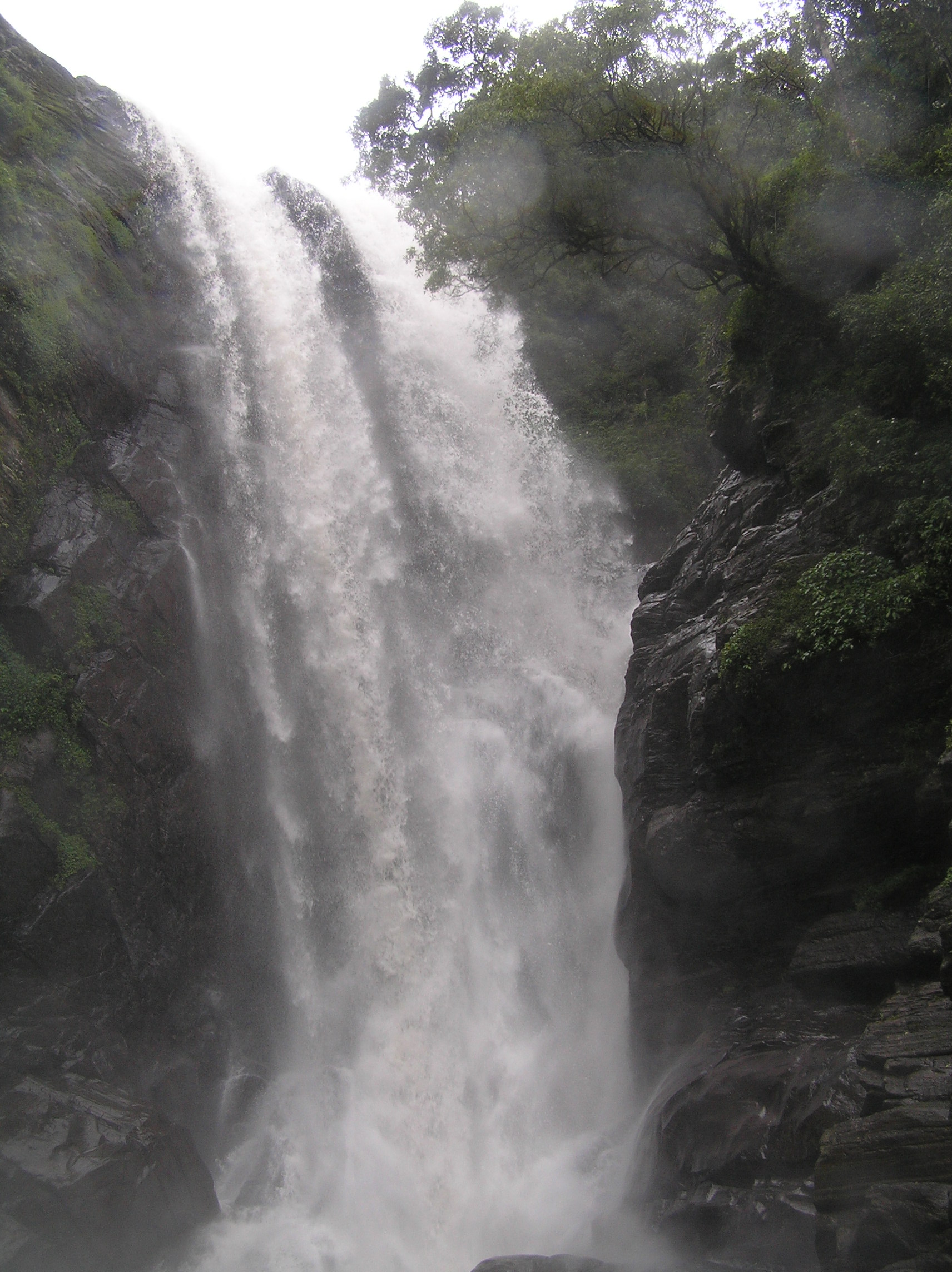
Elgin Falls

This is a list of placenames in Scotland which have subsequently been given to parts of Sri Lanka by Scottish planters. Almost without exception Scottish place names in Sri Lanka occur either in the Hill Country plantations or in Colombo.

As the Scottish coffee and tea planters, including Sri Lanka's first tea planter James Taylor, settled in the country, they named their plantations after their home towns in Scotland. Charles Hay Cameron and his sons named their estates after Lochiel and Erroll their ancestral peerages, as well as Moray, Forres, Glencairn and St Regulus. In Colombo, places were named after Sri Lanka's British governors including Thomas Maitland.

== Hill Country ==
- Abbey Craig
- Aberdeen Falls
- Argyle
- Arthur's Seat
- Balmoral
- Banff
- Barcaple
- Blair Atholl
- Blinkbonney
- Braemore
- Braemar
- Caledonia
- Camnethan
- Caskieben
- Clydesdale
- Craig
- Craigie Lea
- Cullen
- Dalhousie
- Dunbar
- Dunsinane
- Dunkeld
- Edinburgh
- Elgin - named after Elgin, a major town of Moray in Scotland.
- Erroll
- Eskadale
- Fordyce
- Forres
- Frotoft
- Glasgow
- Glassaugh
- Gleneagles
- Goat fell
- Hatton
- Highland
- Holyrood
- Iona
- Kinross
- Kirkoswald
- Leitch
- Lammermoor
- Liddesdale
- Logie
- Lonach
- Macduff
- Mayfield
- Melfort
- Midlothian
- Morar
- Moray
- Mount Vernon
- Nairn
- Newburgh
- Oliphant
- Panmure
- Portree
- Robgill
- Rosneath
- Relugas
- St Andrew's
- St Clair's
- Sanquhar
- Strathdon
- Strathspey
- Sutherland
- Tillicoultry
- Urie
- Ythanside

== Low Country ==
- Clyde
- Culloden
- Dalkeith
- Lauderdale
- Perth

== Colombo ==
- Kinross Avenue
- Maitland Crescent
