= Uda Pussellawa =

Udapussellawa උඩපුස්සල්ලාව
- Town
- Interactive map of Udapussellawa
- Coordinates: 6°59′59″N 80°54′14″E
- Country: Sri Lanka
- Province: Central Province
- Time zone: UTC+5:30 (Sri Lanka Standard Time)

Udapussellawa is a small town in Sri Lanka. It is located in the Walapane Divisional Secretariat of Nuwara Eliya District in Central Province.

== See also ==
- List of towns in Central Province, Sri Lanka
