= Tormsdale =

Coordinates: 58°26′3″N 3°28′42″W

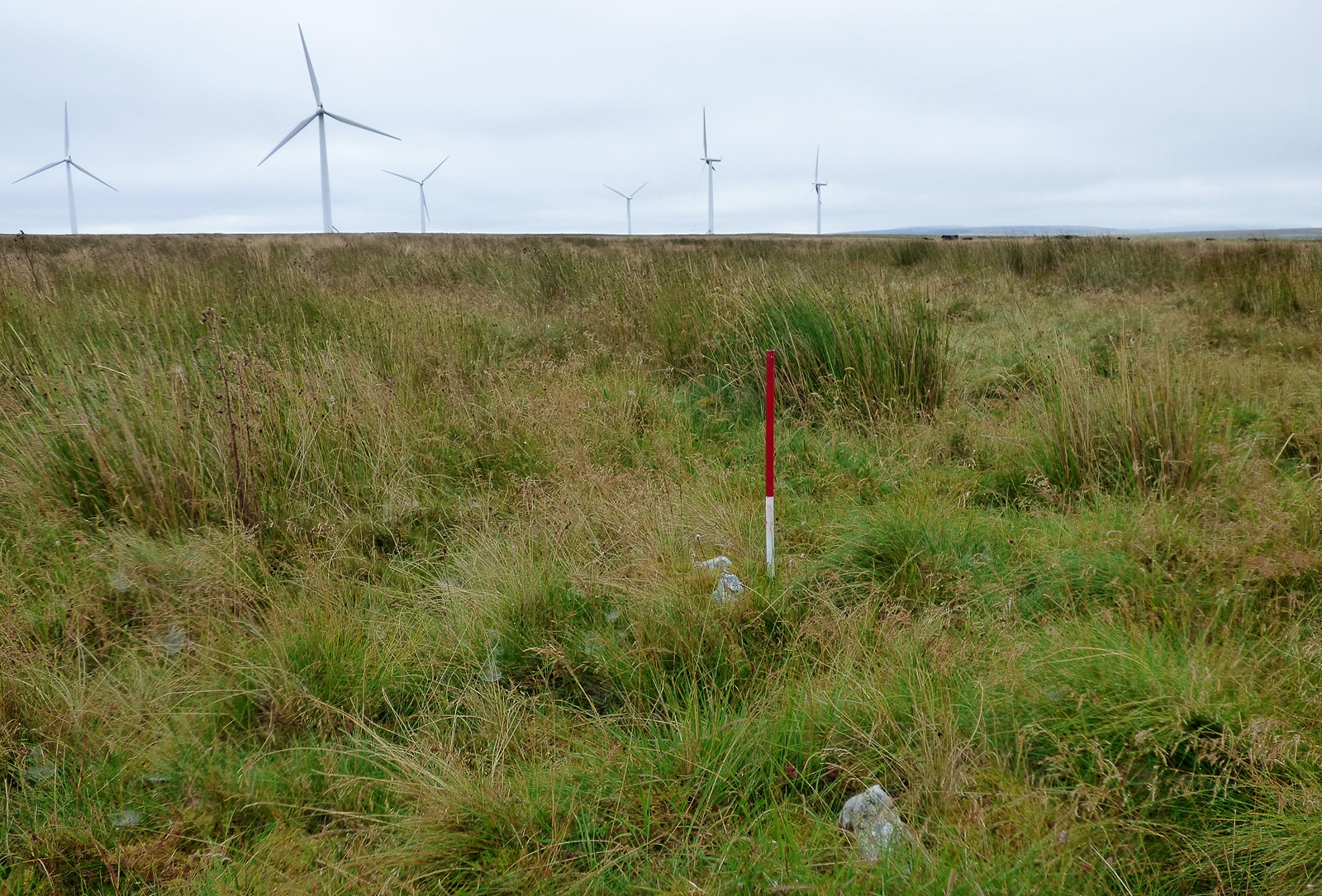
Stones at Tormsdale, with a 1 metre (3 ft 3 in) measuring rod

Tormsdale is a megalithic site on the banks of the River Thurso, in Caithness, Scotland. It is 3 kilometres (1.9 mi) south of Westerdale.

The site consists of some low stone rows which are difficult to trace as the stones are small and have been partly overgrown by grass. Tormsdale is near to another stone row at Dirlot, and is also close to the brochs at Tulach Beag and Tulach Mor.
