= Paranavithana =

Paranavithana is a surname. Notable people with the surname include:

- Dasun Paranavithana (born 1991), Sri Lankan footballer
- Navod Paranavithana (born 2002), Sri Lankan cricketer
- Senarath Paranavitana (1896–1972), Sri Lankan archeologist
