= Elgin Falls =

Coordinates: 6°52′N 80°46′E

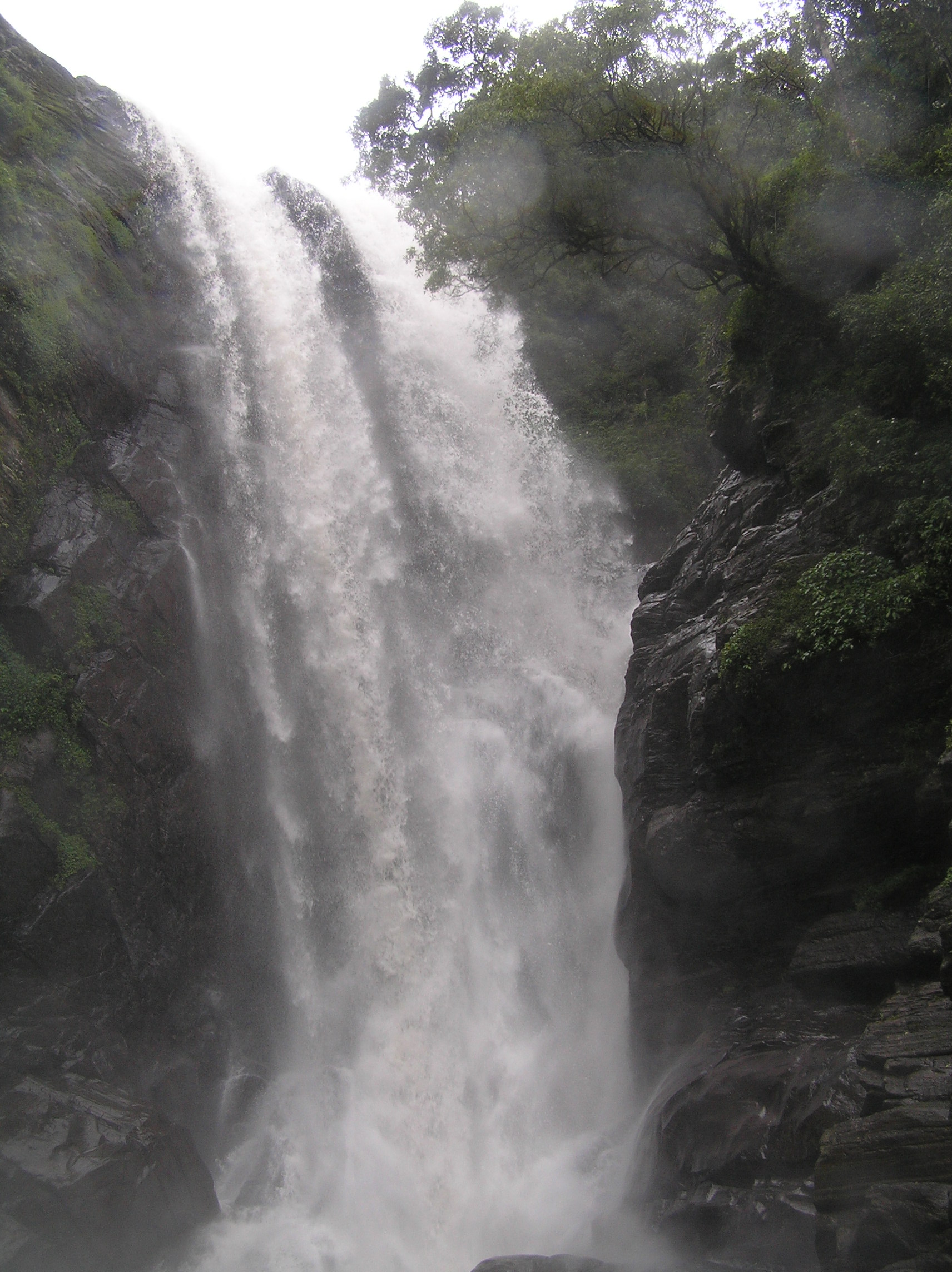
- Interactive map of Elgin Falls
- Location: Ambewela, Sri Lanka
- Elevation: 1,500 m (4,900 ft)
- Total height: 25 m (82 ft)
- Number of drops: 1
- Watercourse: a tributary of Dambagasthalawa Oya

Elgin Falls is a waterfall in Sri Lanka, located in the Elgin tea estate, which is 18 km (11 mi) from Nuwara Eliya, Sri Lanka. The waterfall is 25 m (82 ft) in height. Elgin Falls is named after Elgin, a major town of Moray in Scotland. The falls are at about 1,500 m (4,900 ft) above sea level. There are several ways to access the waterfall. When traveling by railway between Nanu Oya and Ambewela, the falls can be seen picturesquely.

== See also ==
- Locations in Sri Lanka with a Scottish name
- List of waterfalls
- List of waterfalls of Sri Lanka
