= Dalhousie, Sri Lanka =

Town in Central Province, Sri Lanka

Coordinates: 6°49′N 80°31′E

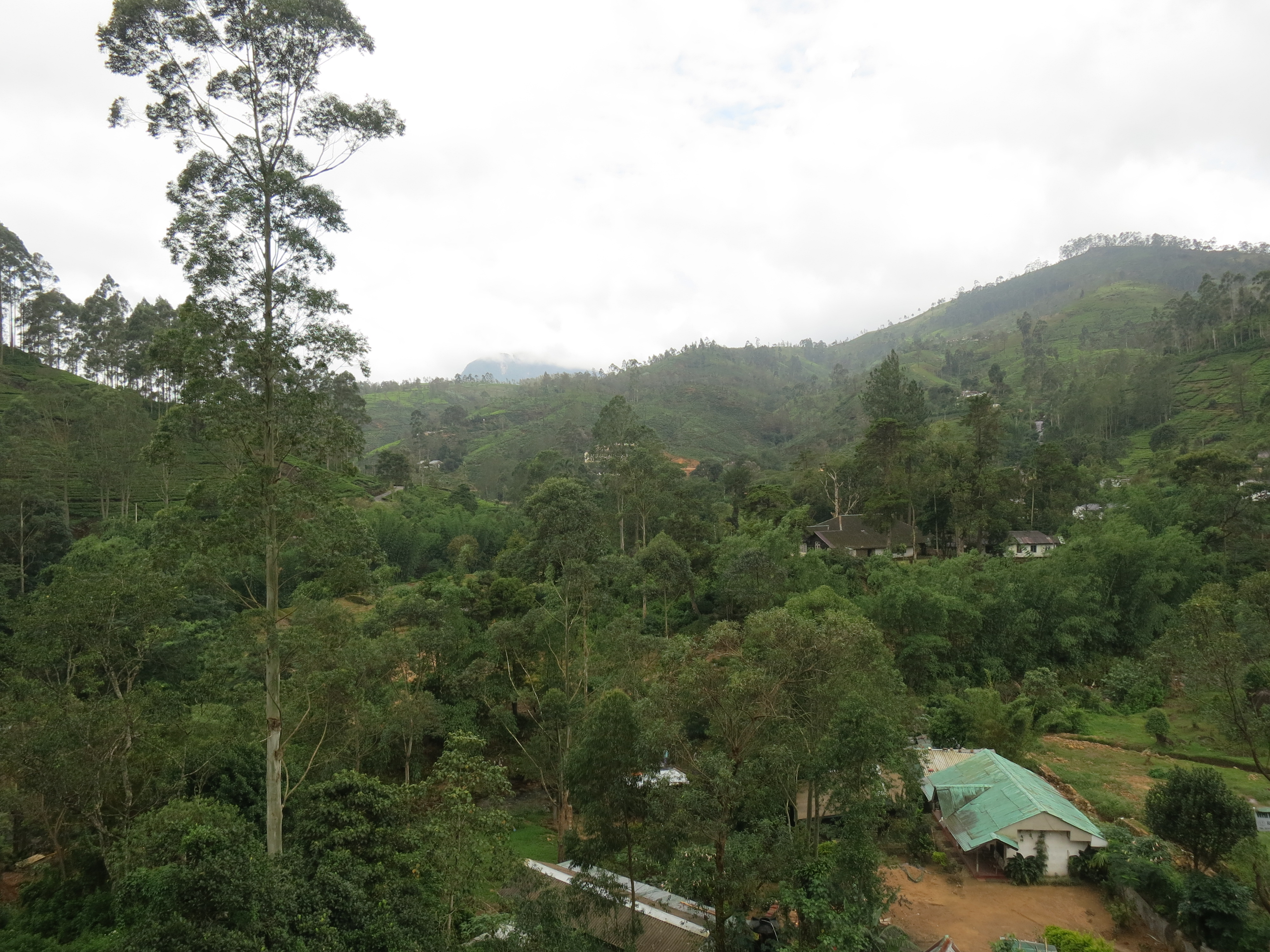
Nature and rain forest around the mountain there

Dalhousie, Nallathanniya or Delhousie is a village in Nuwara Eliya District, Sri Lanka. The village is two hours from Hatton city and situated en route to Adam's Peak. The village borrowed its name from a nearby tea estate.

== See also ==
- Locations in Sri Lanka with a Scottish name
- Sri Pada Peace Pagoda
