= List of Archaeological Protected Monuments in Nuwara Eliya District =

This is a list of Archaeological Protected Monuments in Nuwara Eliya District, Sri Lanka.

Monument	Image	Location	Grama Niladhari Division	Divisional Secretary's Division	Registered	Description	Refs
Aluth Nuwara Devalaya, Liyanwela		Galapitayaya	No. 505 E Madumana	Walapane	22 July 2011		
Ambagamuwa Stone Inscription		Sellipigama	Dagampitiya	Ambagamuwa	6 June 2008	Stone inscription of King Vijayabahu I	
Anilana Craigbank Hotel		No. 48 Waterfield Drive, Nuwara Eliya		Nuwara Eliya	23 February 2007	Colonial cottage known as Craigbank, bearing Assessment No. 10	
Aranthana Raja Maha vihara			No. 494-D Deliwela	Hanguranketha	6 June 2008	The Buddha shrine	
Babarakele Sri Maha Vihara		A5 Peradeniya-Badulla-Chenkalady (PBC) Highway, Nuwara Eliya		Nuwara Eliya	23 February 2007	Buddhist temple, bearing Assessment No 351/1	
Baker's Ward		Hospital Road, Nuwara Eliya	No. 535-G - Hawa Eliya North	Nuwara Eliya	6 February 2009	Baker's Ward at the Nuwara Eliya District Hospital	
Seneviratne building		Badulla Road (cnr Lawson Road), Nuwara Eliya		Nuwara Eliya	23 February 2007	Two-storey office building bearing Assessment No. 01	
British Colonial gravestones		Golf Club Road, Nuwara Eliya	No. 535 of the Nuwara Eliya	Nuwara Eliya	3 December 2011	The tomb stones of the English, Thomas William Rogenson, Lieutenant Colonel Monroe, Sir William Rogith, Henripale and wife of Major Bailey buried near the Golf Club House of Nuwara Eliya	
Brokenest building		Waterfield Drive, Nuwara Eliya Municipal Council		Nuwara Eliya	23 February 2007	Building known as Brokenest, bearing Assessment No. 98	
Bronant Building		St Andrew's Drive, Nuwara Eliya Municipal Council		Nuwara Eliya	23 February 2007	Building known as Bronant, bearing Assessment No. 128	
Burnesike building		Waterfield Drive, Nuwara Eliya		Nuwara Eliya	23 February 2007	Building known as Burnesike, bearing Assessment No. 56	
Ceybank Rest (formerly Heritage Hotel)		No. 119 Badulla Road, Nuwara Eliya		Nuwara Eliya	23 February 2007	Two storey Victorian building known as Ceybank, bearing Assessment No. 114	
Cheltenham Cottage		Haddon Hill Road, Nuwara Eliya		Nuwara Eliya	23 February 2007	Building known as Cheltenam, bearing Assessment No. 16	
Clifton Inn building		No. 154 Badulla Road, Nuwara Eliya		Nuwara Eliya	23 February 2007	Building knows as Clifton Inn, bearing Assessment No. 162	
Collingwood Hotel		No. 128 Badulla Road, Nuwara Eliya		Nuwara Eliya	23 February 2007	Two storey colonial building known as Collingwood bearing Assessment No. 126	
Dan Bungalow (Oakley Cottage)		No. 34 Upper Lake Road, Nuwara Eliya	No. 535-D	Nuwara Eliya	6 February 2009		
Dehadu Kadulla		Kadadora	Mawela-West	Kothmale	6 June 2008	Stone entrance with carved steps	
Devoldevi Devalaya		Liyantota	Dagampitiya	Ambagamuwa	6 June 2008		
Divisional Forest and Range Forest Offices		Old Uda Pussellawa Road, Nuwara Eliya	Nuwara Eliya central	Nuwara Eliya	22 July 2011	The building bearing Assessment Numbers 68, 70, in which the Divisional Forest Office and the Range Forest Office are housed	
Ferncliff building		No. 7-10 Wedderburn Road, Nuwara Eliya		Nuwara Eliya	23 February 2007	Building known as Ferncliff, bearing Assessment No. 7/5	
Freehill Building		St. Andrew's Drive, Nuwara Eliya		Nuwara Eliya	23 February 2007	Building known as Freehill, bearing Assessment No. 150	
Galpalama Old Railway Bridge			Galpalama	Nuwara Eliya	22 July 2011		
Grand Hotel		No. 5 Grand Hotel Road, Nuwara Eliya		Nuwara Eliya	23 February 2007	Building known as Grand Hotel, bearing Assessment No. 17	
Girilenarama Vihara		Morahengama		Ambagamuwa	6 June 2008	A drip-ledged cave	
Hambiliya archaeological site			Kohombagana	Hanguranketha	22 July 2011	The Gallena (rock cave) with a drip-ledged inscription	
Hanguranketha Maha Devalaya		Hanguranketha		Hanguranketha	1 November 1996	Vishnu Devalaya, Aluth Nuwara Devalaya, image house, kitchen, rampart and old Waraqa tree	
Hatton National Bank building		No. 42 Queen Elizabeth Drive (Badulla Drive), Nuwara Eliya		Nuwara Eliya	23 February 2007	Hatton National Bank Building bearing Assessment No. 42	
Holy Emmanuel Church, Hanguranketha		Haragama Road, Hanguranketha	Kottala	Hanguranketha	6 July 2007		
Holy Trinity Church, Nuwara Eliya		Church Road, Nuwara Eliya	No. 535D	Nuwara Eliya	23 February 2007	Building known as Holy Trinity Church bearing Assessment No. 1/6	
Holy Trinity Church Vicarage		Church Road, Nuwara Eliya		Nuwara Eliya	23 February 2007	Building known as Vicarage, bearing Assessment No. 06	
Kandurakade Stone Inscription		Kandurakade		Hanguranketha	1 November 1996	At Dehitennahena land	
Kataragama Devalaya, Morape		Morape	Maswela	Kothmale	10 April 2009	The Morape Sri Kataragam Devale Premises, buildings and other Archaeological remains situated within the limits	
Kotagepitiya Ambalama			Kotagepitiya	Kothmale	3 December 2011	The Kotagepitiya doss house	
Lakshmi Mahal building		Badulla Road, Nuwara Eliya		Nuwara Eliya	23 February 2007	Building known as Lakshimi Mahal, bearing Assessment No. 108	
Lalitha building		Wedderburn Road, Nuwara Eliyal		Nuwara Eliya	23 February 2007	Building known as Lalitha, bearing Assessment No. 09	
Lalith Kotelawala's residence		Wedderburn Road, Nuwara Eliya		Nuwara Eliya	23 February 2007	Building belonging to Lalith Kotelawala, bearing Assessment No. 15	
Land use office building		Queen Elizabeth Drive (Badulla Road) Nuwara Eliya		Nuwara Eliya	23 February 2007	Land use office building bearing Assessment No. 104	
Lihiniyagala Vihara		Lihiniyagala		Hanguranketha	1 November 1996	Vihara and cave	
Loolecondera Tea Estate		Loolkandura	Mawela-West	Deltota	6 June 2008	The well, stone seat, and tea kiln used by James Taylor and belonging to the Loolkandura Tea Estate	
Lynnthorpe building		Badulla Road, Nuwara Eliya		Nuwara Eliya	23 February 2007	Building known as Lynnthorpe, bearing Assessment No. 1/1	
Madanwala Raja Maha Vihara		Madanwala		Hanguranketha	1 November 1996	Len Vihara (Cave temple) and Awasa house	
National Housing Development Authority comprising offices		Hospital Junction	No. 535-F Hawa Eliya West	Nuwara Eliya	6 February 2009	The old buildings of the Explosives Stores of the National Housing Development Authority comprising offices and the Explosives Store at Nuwara-Eliya - Kandapola Road	
New Keena Hotel		Badulla Road, Nuwara Eliya		Nuwara Eliya	23 February 2007	Building known as New Keena Hote, bearing Assessment No. 132A	
Niyamgamdora Raja Maha Vihara/Pattini Devalaya			Niyamgamdora	Kothmale	3 December 2011	The Pattini Devalaya, Aluth Nuwara Devalaya and the old Bodhi Prakaraya situated in the Niyamgamdora Pattini Devala premises and Rajamaha Vihara premises	
Nuwara Eliya Post Office		Queen Elizabeth Drive, Nuwara Eliya		Nuwara Eliya	23 February 2007	Post office building bearing Assessment No. 50	
Nuwara Eliya railway station (closed)		Uda-Pussellawa Road, Nuwara Eliya	No. 535-B Nuwara Eliya Centre	Nuwara Eliya	6 February 2009	The office buildings of the old Nuwara Eliya Railway Station	
Union Church, Nuwara Eliya		Old Uda-Pussellawa Road, Nuwara Eliya		Nuwara Eliya	17 May 2013	Multi-denominational church, established in 1906 by Rev. Arthur Paynter	
Padiyapelella Old Bridge			Padiyapelella	Walapane	24 July 2009	The Bridge built across Belihul Oya	
Palace ruins of inner land and the Fence		Yatihanguranketha		Hanguranketha	1 November 1996		
Pattini Devalaya, Atthanakumbura		Atthanakumbura		Hanguranketha	1 November 1996		
Pattini Devalaya, Hanguranketha		Hanguranketha		Hanguranketha	1 November 1996	Devalaya, rampart and Vahalkada	
Pattipola rail tunnel			No. 477-Pattipola	Nuwara Eliya	6 February 2009	The Pattipola Underground Railway, Track	
Pothgul Maliga Vihara		Udamaluwa	Hanguranketha	Hanguranketha	22 October 2010	Sangawasa (Dwelling House)	
Pothgul Palace		Hanguranketha		Hanguranketha	1 November 1996	Palace buildings	
Prime Minister's Lodge		No's 19-23 Grand Hotel Road, Nuwara Eliya		Nuwara Eliya	23 February 2007	Building known as “Prime Minister’s Lodge” bearing Assessment No. 44	
Princess Bungalows		No. 14 Wedderburn Road, Nuwara Eliya		Nuwara Eliya	23 February 2007	Building known as Princes Guest House,” bearing Assessment No. 14	
Pusulpitiya Raja Maha Vihara		Pusulpitiya	Nawangama	Kothmale		Image house and other ruins	
Queen's Cottage		Grand Hotel Road, Nuwara Eliya		Nuwara Eliya	23 February 2007	Former country residence of Governor of Ceylon building known as Queens Cottage	
Ranamune Pihilla		Mawela	Mawela-West	Kothmale	6 June 2008	Mawela Ranamune Ambalama and water pipe	
Rikillagaskada Ambalama		Rikillagaskada		Hanguranketha	6 June 2008	Ambalama	
Selwood Cottage		St. Andrew’s Drive, Nuwara Eliya		Nuwara Eliya	23 February 2007	Building known as “Selwood” bearing Assessment No. 160St. Andrew's Drive	
Sisters of the Holy Cross Menzingen convent		Wedderburn Road, Nuwara Eliya		Nuwara Eliya	23 February 2007	Building known as Holy Cross Convent, bearing Assessment Nos. 13, 13/1, 13/2	
Sluice at Lake Gregory		Abayapura Road, Nuwara Eliya	No. 435-B, Kalukele	Nuwara Eliya	6 February 2009	The Sluice gate of the Gregory Wewa	
SOS Children's Village, Nuwara Eliya		A5 Peradeniya-Badulla-Chenkalady (PBC) Highway, Nuwara Eliya		Nuwara Eliya	23 February 2007	Building known as 'SOS Building' (bearing Assessment No. 340)	
Sri Sangaraja Purana vihara		Damunumeya	No. 494-D Deliwela	Hanguranketha	6 June 2008	Drip ledged rock cave	
Senior Police Superintendent's Office		Badulla Road, Nuwara Eliya		Nuwara Eliya	23 February 2007	Senior Police Superintendent's Office, bearing Assessment No. 38	
St. Margaret's Church		A7 Avissawella-Nuwara Eliya Highway, Kotagala	No. 475-B, Dimbulla	Nuwara Eliya	23 January 2009	19th-century stone church	
Talawakelle railway station		A7 Avissawella-Nuwara Eliya Highway, Talawakelle	No. 475 E Talawakelle	Nuwara Eliya	6 February 2009	The office buildings and stores	
The Infectious Diseases Ward			No. 475-B, Dimbulla	Nuwara Eliya	6 February 2009	Hospital building	
The official residence of the District Judge			No. 535-G - Hava Eliya North	Nuwara Eliya	6 February 2009		
The Pattipola Explosives Stores			No. 477-Pattipola	Nuwara Eliya	6 February 2009		
Travel Lodge, Nuwara Eliya		No. 130 Badulla Road, Nuwara Eliya		Nuwara Eliya	23 February 2007	Building known as Travel Lodge bearing Assessment No. 140	
Trevene Hotel		No. 17 Park Road, Nuwara Eliya		Nuwara Eliya	23 February 2007	Single-storey colonial bungalow known as Trevin bearing Assessment Nos' 31 and 1/31	
Unique View building		No. 2A/60, Unique View Road, Nuwara Eliya		Nuwara Eliya	23 February 2007	Building known as “Unique View” bearing Assessment No. 2	
Vatarakgoda Stupa			Wathumulla	Walapane	8 September 1967	Stupa	
Villafern building		Wedderburn Road, Nuwara Eliyal		Nuwara Eliya	23 February 2007	Building known as “Villafern” bearing Assessment No. 24	
Vilwala Raja Maha Vihara		Vilwala		Hanguranketha	1 November 1996	Image house, rock inscription	
Walapane Madulla Sri Pathini Temple		Walapane	No. 527-Madulla North	Walapane	6 June 2008		
Wataddara Sri Gnanodaya Pirivena			Wataddara	Kothmale	17 May 2013	Preaching hall (Darmashalawa)	
Watermead building		Badulla Road, Nuwara Eliya		Nuwara Eliya	23 February 2007	Two-storey colonial building known as Watermead, bearing Assessment No. 68	
Wattaranthenne Purana Vihara		Padiyapelella	Ampitigoda	Hanguranketha	12 June 2015	Shrine and Chaitya	
Wegama Vihara		Wegama		Hanguranketha	1 November 1996	Image house and stone inscription	
Yathuru Gasu Liyadde Vihara		Maswela	Maswela	Kothmale	6 June 2008	Buddha shrine, the Dhamma discourse hall and monuments	
