= Hatton, Sri Lanka =

Hatton හැටන් ஹட்டன்
- Town
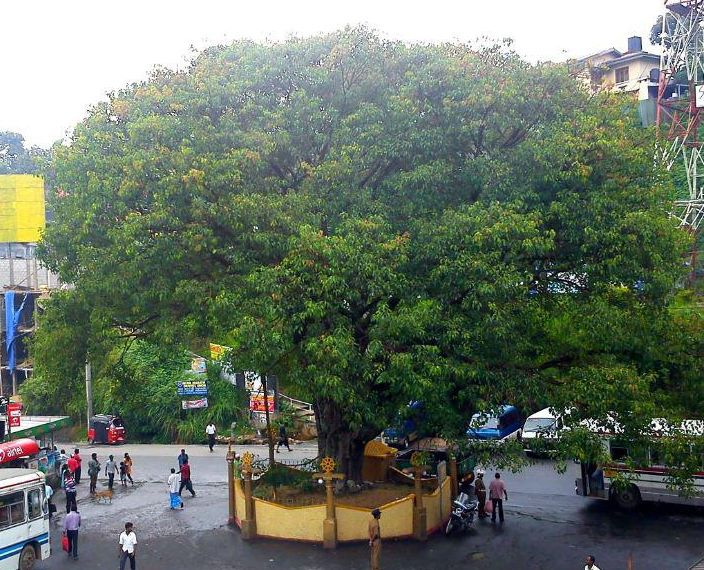

- Location within Sri Lanka
- Coordinates: 6°53′23″N 80°35′53″E
- Country: Sri Lanka
- Province: Central Province
- District: Nuwara Eliya District
- Divisional Secretariat: Nuwara Eliya Divisional Secretariat (Ambagamuwa Divisional Secretariat)
- Established: 1821

Government
  - Type: Urban Council
  - Body: Hatton Dickoya Urban Council
  - Chairman: S. Balachandran (Unofficial Magistrate)
- Elevation: 1,271 m (4,170 ft)

Population (2018)
  - Total: 15,073
- Time zone: UTC+5:30 (Sri Lanka Standard Time Zone)
- Postal code: 22000
- Area code: 051

Hatton (Sinhala: හැටන්, Tamil: ஹட்டன்) is a major town in the Nuwara Eliya District of Central Province, Sri Lanka, governed by the Hatton-Dickoya Urban Council. Hatton is a major centre of the Sri Lankan tea industry.

Hatton is one of the busiest cities in the hill country of Sri Lanka and is colloquially known as the tea capital of the country, as it is the central point for most upcountry tea growing regions, such as Maskeliya, Talawakelle, Bogawantalawa and Dickoya.

Hatton is located approximately 112 km (70 mi) southeast of Colombo and 72 km (45 mi) south of Kandy, at an elevation of 1,271 m (4,170 ft) above sea level.

Hatton was founded during the British colonial times in order to serve the coffee plantations and latter tea estates. The name of the town refers to the village in Aberdeenshire, Scotland. A number of the surrounding tea estates are also named after Scottish villages.

Hatton serves as a gateway to Adam's Peak (Sri Pada) and Sinharaja Forest Reserve, but is better known for its Ceylon tea plantations.

== Transport ==
The Hatton Railway Station is located on the Main Line (Colombo-Badulla) railway line.

The town is located on the A7 highway (Avissawella-Nuwara Eliya) a part of the Avissawella-Nuwara Eliya main road.

== Attractions ==
- Adam's Peak, a 2,243 m (7,359 ft) high mountain, which is major Buddhist pilgrimage destination
- Devon Falls, a 97 m (318 ft) high waterfall
- Dunbar Ground
- Holy Cross Church (Catholic)
- Laxapana Falls, a 126 m (413 ft) high waterfall
- Jummah Masjid / Islamic mosque
- Maanica Pillayaar/Sri Manickapillayar Kovil, a Hindu temple dedicated to Ganesh
- Castlereigh Dam
- St. Clair's Falls, an 80 m (260 ft) high and 50 m (160 ft) wide waterfall
- Shri Nigrodharamaya Buddhist Temple
- Singha Malai Tunnel, the second longest railway tunnel in Sri Lanka and the longest on main line (located between Hatton and Kotagala)
- 60 feet bridge, a 18.3 m (60 ft) long steel railway bridge (located between Hatton and Kotagala)
- Sri Muthu Mariyamman Kovil, a Hindu temple
- Subramaniam Kovil, Hindu temple dedicated to Murugan

== Education ==
- Highlands Central College
- Highlevel International School
- Life-spring English Academy
- Oxbridge International College
- St. Gabriel's Convent
- St. John Bosco's College
- Shannon Tamil Maha Vidyalayam
- Sri Pada Central College
- Univenture international
- Webster International School

An interfaith project supported by the Comboni Missionary Sisters also provides English language learning and communication skills for local women.

== Economy ==
Hatton is the largest town in the Nuwara Eliya District. A number of major corporations have branch offices in Hatton, servicing industries including textiles, tea, furniture and information technology. The Hatton National Bank, the largest privately owned commercial bank in the country, and Brown and Company, a leading engineering firm, were both founded in Hatton.

Over 48% of the town's population employed on tea estates.

== Neighbourhoods ==
- Nuwara Eliya
- Maskeliya
- Bogawantalawa
- Talawakelle
- Dickoya
- Norwood
- Watawala
- Ginigathena
- Kotagala
