= Hapugastalawa =

Hapugastalawa හපුගස්තලාව ஹபுகஸ்தலாவை
- town
- Interactive map of Hapugastalawa
- Country: Sri Lanka
- Province: Central
- District: Nuwara Eliya
- Divisional Secretariat: Kothmale Divisional Secretariat
- Time zone: UTC+5:30 (Sri Lanka Standard Time)
- Postal code: 20668

Hapugastalawa (Sinhala: හපුගස්තලාව, Tamil: ஹபுகஸ்தலாவை) is a rural town in the Nuwara Eliya District, Sri Lanka. Hapugastalawa is located 52.7 km (32.7 mi) west of Nuwara Eliya, in the Divisional Secretariat Division of the Kothmale.

== Geography ==
Hapugastalawa is located at the edge of the Kothmale Valley with the villages of Halgolla, Harangala, Ruwanpura and Gorakaoya. To the east and southeast Hapugastalawa is bounded Halgolla Village which shares the same postcode of 20668. The suburb is predominantly residential with the main shopping area of Hapugastalawa centered between Kothmale, Nawalapitiya Gorakaoya and Gampola roads around the town centre.

== Commercial area ==
The Hapugastalawa commercial area is located near the small lake. The town is organised with specialty stores, supermarkets and many restaurants run by Muslim, Sinhala and Tamil owners. The ethnic background of its shoppers has created a hub of restaurants and eateries in the area.

== Transport ==
Hapugastalawa is relatively well served by public transport. Numerous bus services operate from the small interchange. These include the 720 route between Nawalapitiya and Nuwara-Eliya.

== Landmarks ==
- Kothmale Dam
- Kothmale Mahaweli Maha saya
- Hapugasthalawa Lake

== Schools ==
- Al Minhaj Central College (National School)
- Al Hamidhiyyah Arabic College
- An Noor Primary School (1-5 Grades)
- Harangala Secondary College
- Halgolla Primary School (1-5 Grades)
- Siri Sumana Maha Vidyalaya (1-A/L)
- Kahira Muslim Maha Vidyalaya (up to A/L Arts stream)
- Nanoda Primary School (1-5 Grades)
- Gamini Dissanayake National School, Kotmale
- Al-Arafa Muslim Vidyalaya (1-11 Grades)
- Sri Sanmuga Vidyalaya, Mamippura (1-5 Grades)

== Religion ==
=== Mosques ===
- Masjidhul Minhaj (Jumma Masjidh)
- Masjidhul Noor (Jumma Masjidh)
- Masjidhul Manar (Jumma Masjidh)
- Masjidhul Abubacker (Jumma Masjidh)
- Masjidhul Hijra (Hurihela)
- Masjidhul Falah (Rockhill)
- Masjidhur Rahman (Kaludamada)
- Masjidhul Hudha (Mamippura)
- Masjidhul Munawwara (Aheswewa Gap)

=== Buddhist Temples ===
- Sri Gunarathana Buddhist Center
- Sri Sugatha Bimbharamaya
- Sri Dharmawijayaramaya
- Sri Jayasumanaramaya
- Sri Sudharshanaramaya
- Halgolla2 Buddhist Temple
- Ahaswewa Bhuddhist Temple
- Werellapathana Bhuddhist Temple
- Sri Kalyanawardhanaramaya
- Sri Sambodhi Viharaya
- Sri Gangaramaya Buddhist Temple

=== Hindu Kovils ===
- Ganadevi Temple

=== Catholic Churches ===
- Holy Mount Assembly Church
