= Hollyrood Grama Niladhari Division =

Hollyrood
- Grama Niladhari Division
- Interactive map of Hollyrood
- Coordinates: 6.948636°N 80.664993°E
- Country: Sri Lanka
- Province: Central Province
- District: Nuwara Eliya District
- Divisional Secretariat: Nuwara Eliya Divisional Secretariat
- Electoral District: Nuwara-Eliya Electoral District
- Polling Division: Nuwara Eliya Maskeliya Polling Division

Area
  - Total: 2.69 km^{2} (1.04 sq mi)
- Elevation: 1,235 m (4,052 ft)

Population (2012)
  - Total: 3,393
  - Density: 1,261/km^{2} (3,270/sq mi)
- ISO 3166 code: LK-2312020

Hollyrood

Hollyrood Grama Niladhari Division is a Grama Niladhari Division of the Nuwara Eliya Divisional Secretariat of Nuwara Eliya District of Central Province, Sri Lanka . It has Grama Niladhari Division Code 475S.

Upper Kotmale Dam are located within, nearby or associated with Hollyrood.

Hollyrood is a surrounded by the Barewell, Devon, Great Western, Thalawakele and Watagoda Grama Niladhari Divisions.

== Demographics ==
=== Ethnicity ===
The Hollyrood Grama Niladhari Division has an Indian Tamil majority (67.7%) and a significant Sinhalese population (27.1%) . In comparison, the Nuwara Eliya Divisional Secretariat (which contains the Hollyrood Grama Niladhari Division) has an Indian Tamil majority (70.5%) and a significant Sinhalese population (20.0%)

Ethnicity in Hollyrood
1. Indian Tamil (67.7%)
2. Sinhalese (27.1%)
3. Moor (3.00%)
4. Sri Lankan Tamil (2.20%)
5. Other (0.00%)

=== Religion ===
The Hollyrood Grama Niladhari Division has a Hindu majority (57.7%) and a significant Buddhist population (26.6%) . In comparison, the Nuwara Eliya Divisional Secretariat (which contains the Hollyrood Grama Niladhari Division) has a Hindu majority (67.7%) and a significant Buddhist population (18.7%)

Religion in Hollyrood
1. Hindu (57.7%)
2. Buddhist (26.6%)
3. Roman Catholic (9.90%)
4. Muslim (3.10%)
5. Other Christian (2.70%)
6. Other (0.00%)

== Gallery ==
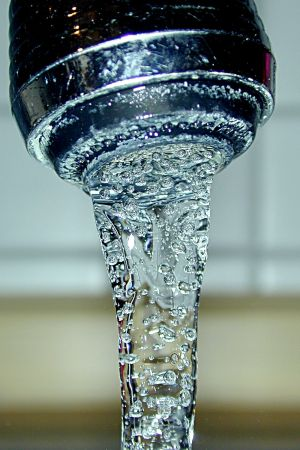
Upper Kotmale Dam
