= Madanwala Grama Niladhari Division =

Madanwala
- Grama Niladhari Division
- Interactive map of Madanwala
- Coordinates: 7.163931°N 80.779609°E
- Country: Sri Lanka
- Province: Central Province
- District: Nuwara Eliya District
- Divisional Secretariat: Hanguranketha Divisional Secretariat
- Electoral District: Nuwara-Eliya Electoral District
- Polling Division: Hanguranketha Polling Division

Area
  - Total: 0.33 km^{2} (0.13 sq mi)
- Elevation: 826 m (2,710 ft)

Population (2012)
  - Total: 695
  - Density: 2,106/km^{2} (5,450/sq mi)
- ISO 3166 code: LK-2306185

Madanwala

Madanwala Grama Niladhari Division is a Grama Niladhari Division of the Hanguranketha Divisional Secretariat of Nuwara Eliya District of Central Province, Sri Lanka. It has Grama Niladhari Division Code 493.

Madanwala is surrounded by the Damunumeya, Diya - Udagama, Dolugala, Kottala and Walalawela Grama Niladhari Divisions.

== Demographics ==
=== Ethnicity ===
The Madanwala Grama Niladhari Division has a Sinhalese majority (98.7%). In comparison, the Hanguranketha Divisional Secretariat (which contains the Madanwala Grama Niladhari Division) has a Sinhalese majority (86.4%)

Ethnicity in Madanwala
1. Sinhalese (98.7%)
2. Sri Lankan Tamil (1.00%)
3. Other (0.30%)

=== Religion ===
The Madanwala Grama Niladhari Division has a Buddhist majority (97.7%). In comparison, the Hanguranketha Divisional Secretariat (which contains the Madanwala Grama Niladhari Division) has a Buddhist majority (86.2%) and a significant Hindu population (12.6%)

Religion in Madanwala
1. Buddhist (97.7%)
2. Roman Catholic (1.30%)
3. Hindu (1.00%)
4. Other (0.00%)
