= Aberdeen Falls =

Waterfall in Sri Lanka

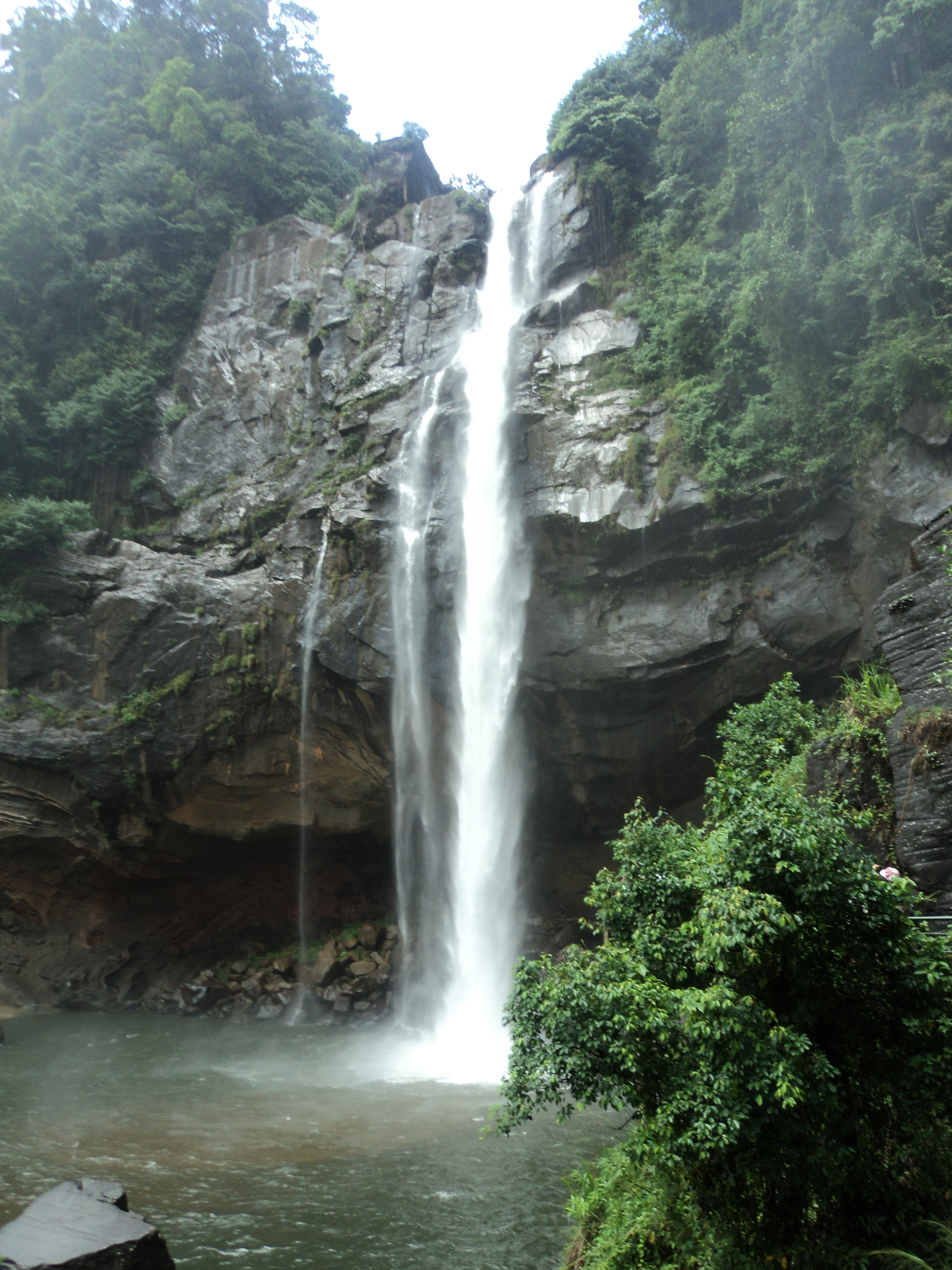

- Location within Sri Lanka
- Location: Ginigathena, Sri Lanka
- Coordinates: 06°56′54″N 80°30′07″E
- Type: Horsetail
- Total height: 98 m (322 ft)
- Number of drops: 1
- Total width: 8 m (26 ft)
- Watercourse: Kehelgamu Oya

Aberdeen Falls (sinhala: ඇබර්ඩීන් දිය ඇල්ල) is a 98 m (322 ft) high waterfall on the Kehelgamu Oya near Ginigathena, in the Nuwara Eliya District of Sri Lanka. Kehelgamu Oya is a major tributary of the Kelani River. The waterfall is ranked as the 18th highest on the Island.

The naturally formed rock formations at the base of the waterfall allow visitors to walk behind the curtain of water. This makes it one of the few waterfalls in Sri Lanka that can be viewed from the inside. The waterfall is characterized by its two-tiered cascade. The water descends over two distinct and closely spaced vertical drops. The upper tier is more gradual, while the lower tier has a more pronounced drop where the water plunges into a pool at the base of the waterfall. A large plunge pool is located at the base of the waterfall.

== Viewing Season ==
The waterfall maintains its flow year-round, but the best time to visit is between September and December. During this period, rainfall increases the volume of the waterfall.

== Etymology ==
The name “Aberdeen Falls” is historically connected to the colonial tea plantations of the region. The waterfall was named after the nearby Aberdeen Tea Estate, which itself was associated with Scottish planters who migrated to Sri Lanka during the British colonial period.

Aberdeen estate is believed to have been named after Aberdeen, the third largest city in Scotland and the capital of Aberdeenshire.

== Location and Access ==
The Aberdeen Falls are located near the town of Ginigathhena in the Nuwara Eliya District. From Ginigathhena, travelers can reach the falls via Ambatale Road. The journey involves passing a Buddha statue and continuing on foot for about 1.2 kilometers along a narrow path through forested terrain. This walk is considered scenic and offers views of the surrounding hills and vegetation.

Visitors traveling from Colombo usually take the Hatton–Colombo Road and turn off at Kalugala Junction. They then drive about 15 kilometers to the entrance near Kalawaldeniya. The drive from Ginigathhena to the base of the waterfall usually takes about 45 minutes, covering roughly 19 kilometers, followed by a short hike.

== Tourism ==
Aberdeen Falls is generally less frequented than major sites like Laxapana Falls. Its proximity to Laxapana makes it a common secondary destination for visitors to the area.

There is no entry fee for the falls. While on-site guided tours are not typically offered, transportation and informational services can be arranged through local tour operators in the region.

This pool is notable for its depth and size. The water is usually cool, and the pool's edges are rocky. Depths can vary throughout the pool, so swimming is not recommended. Several accidents caused by drowning have been reported, and authorities advise visitors to enjoy the falls from a safe distance.

The site is popular for photography and has also gained attention as a destination for recreational cycling. Visitors are advised to exercise caution near the waterfall and pool, and to help preserve the natural environment.

== See also ==
- Locations in Sri Lanka with a Scottish name
- List of waterfalls
- List of waterfalls of Sri Lanka

== Notes ==
- Senanayake, Chanaka (2004). Sri Lankawe Diya Eli (in Sinhala) (1st ed.). Sooriya Publishers. ISBN 955-8892-06-8.
