= Baker's Ward =

- Interactive map of the Baker's Ward area

General information
- Type: Hospital ward
- Architectural style: British
- Location: Hospital Road, Nuwara Eliya, Sri Lanka
- Coordinates: 6.9741°N 80.7802°E
- Estimated completion: 1885; 141 years ago

Technical details
- Floor count: 1

Archaeological Protected Monument of Sri Lanka
- Designated: 6 February 2009

Baker's Ward is an historical hospital ward at the Nuwara Eliya General Hospital. It is a single-storey brick and tile building, built in 1885.

== History ==
John Garland Baker (1822–1883), the brother of Samuel Baker, married Elizabeth (Eliza) Heberden Martin (1821–1896), the sister of Henrietta Ann Bidgood Martin (Samuel Baker's wife) at a double wedding in 1843. Samuel and John travelled Mauritius in 1844 to manage the family's plantations there, before moving to Ceylon in 1846 and in the following year founded an agricultural settlement, Mahagastota, at Nuwara Eliya, a mountain health-resort. In 1866 Samuel left Ceylon however his brother, John, and his wife, Eliza remained. John bred and trained race horses, constructing the Nuwara Eliya Racecourse in 1875. On 29 December 1883 John died after a brief illness. His wife helped raise funds to build a complete hospital ward and gifted it to the hospital in 1885 in remembrance of him. The ward was solely for the use of planters and other Europeans. In October 1929 the issue was raised in the Legislative Council by V. S. de S. Wikramanayake, the member representing the Southern Province Eastern Division, leading to the inclusion of Ceylonese patients.

== Recognition ==
On 6 February 2009 the building was formally recognised by the Government as an Archaeological Protected Monument.

In 2016 following the opening of a new Rs 7 billion, six-storey district general hospital (which included 660 beds, an intensive care unit, accident ward, pharmacy, dialysis unit and nursing housing quarters), the hospital's administration decided to convert Baker's Ward into a museum. In March 2019 a foundation was established to accomplish that goal.

== See also ==
- List of Archaeological Protected Monuments in Nuwara Eliya District
