= Nildandahinna Divisional Secretariat =

- Divisional Secretariat
- Country: Sri Lanka
- Province: Central Province
- District: Nuwara Eliya District

Government
  - Type: Divisional Secretariat
  - Divisional Secretary: Mrs. B.W.M.N.P.M. Weerasooriya

Population (2025)
  - Total: 46,291
- Time zone: UTC+5:30 (Sri Lanka Standard Time)
- Area code: +94
- GN Divisions: 63

Nildandahinna Divisional Secretariat is a Divisional Secretariat of Nuwara Eliya District of Central province, Sri Lanka

== Demography ==
=== Based on Gender ===
Demography based on gender in 2025.
1. Male 22,986 (49.7%)
2. Female 23,305 (50.3%)

=== Based on Nationality ===
Demography based on nationality.
1. Sinhala 34,933 (72.1%)
2. Indian Tamil 10,773 (22.2%)
3. Sri Lankan Tamil 2,196 (4.53%)
4. Muslim 579 (1.19%)
