= Agalakumbura =

- Village
- Location within Sri Lanka
- Coordinates: 7°7′N 80°56′E
- Country: Sri Lanka
- Province: Central Province
- District: Nuwara Eliya
- Time zone: UTC+5:30 (Sri Lanka Standard Time)

Agalakumbura is a village in the Nuwara Eliya District, Central Province, Sri Lanka.

== See also ==
- List of towns in Central Province, Sri Lanka
