= Keenagolla =

- Village
- Location within Sri Lanka
- Country: Sri Lanka
- Province: Central Province
- District: Nuwara Eliya
- Elevation: 1,015 m (3,330 ft)

Population
  - Total: 1,000
- Time zone: UTC+5:30 (Sri Lanka Standard Time)

Keenagolla (Sinhala: කීනගොල්ල) is a village in the Nuwara Eliya District, Central Province of Sri Lanka.

== See also ==
- List of towns in Central Province, Sri Lanka
