= Hatton-Dickoya Urban Council =

Leadership
- Chairman: S. Balachandran

The Hatton-Dickoya Urban Council is the local authority for the town of Hatton in the Nuwara Eliya District, Central Province, Sri Lanka. The HDUC is responsible for providing a variety of local public services including roads, sanitation, drains, housing, libraries, public parks and recreational facilities.
