= Hanguranketha Divisional Secretariat =

Hanguranketha Divisional Secretariat Sangaruwanketha
- Divisional Secretariat
- Nickname: Diyathilakapura
- Country: Sri Lanka
- Province: Central Province
- District: Nuwara Eliya District
- Time zone: UTC+5:30 (Sri Lanka Standard Time)

Hanguranketha Divisional Secretariat is a Divisional Secretariat of Nuwara Eliya District, of Central Province, Sri Lanka.

Poramadulla Central College is located in the Rikillagaskada community in Hanguranketha.

== Demography-Religion ==
Religion in Hanguranketha DS Division (2012)
1. Buddhist (86.2%)
2. Hindu (12.6%)
3. Muslim (0.20%)
4. Roman Catholic (0.60%)
5. Other Christian (0.40%)
6. Other (0.00%)
