= Karandagolla =

- Village
- Country: Sri Lanka
- Province: Central Province
- Time zone: UTC+5:30 (Sri Lanka Standard Time)

Karandagolla is a village in Sri Lanka. It is located within Central Province.

Poramadulla Central College was previously located in Karandagolla. It had opened there in 1901.

== See also ==
- List of towns in Central Province, Sri Lanka
