= Hatton railway station (Sri Lanka) =

Railway station in Hatton, Sri Lanka

Hatton
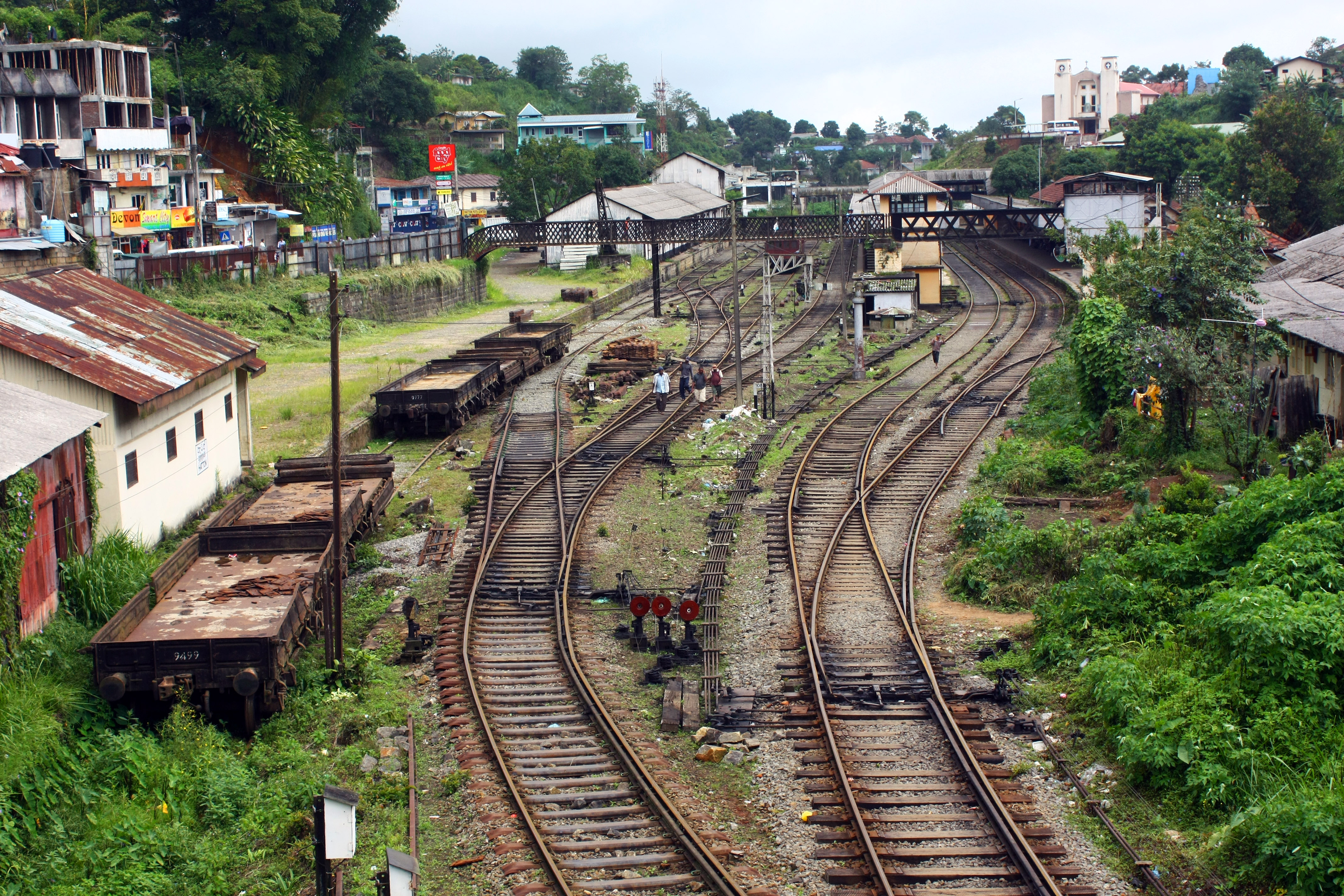
- Hatton railway station

General information
- Location: Hatton, Sri Lanka; Sri Lanka
- Coordinates: 6°53′35″N 80°35′51″E
- Operated by: Sri Lanka Railways
- Line: Main line
- Distance: 173.06 km (107.5 mi) from Colombo
- Platforms: 4 side platforms

Other information
- Station code: HTN

History
- Opened: 4 June 1884
Location

Hatton Station is a railway station on the Main (Colombo-Badulla) railway line in Sri Lanka. It is situated between Rozella and Kotagala railway stations. It is 173.06 kilometres (107.53 mi) along the railway line from the Colombo Fort Railway Station at an elevation of about 1,262.5 m (4,142 ft) above sea level.

The Hatton railway station was opened on 4 June 1884 when the main line was extended from Nawalapitiya to Hatton. The station was the terminus of the main line until the line was extended to Nanu-Oya on 20 May 1885. The station has a reservation and train enquiry section, ticket office, cloak room, waiting hall, book stall, tea stall, toilet blocks and catering area together with a public car parking area.

The railway station has four platforms but normally only three of the platforms serve rail passengers. Platform No. 1 caters for trains to Badulla that come from Colombo Fort or Kandy whilst platform No. 2 is used for down trains which is to Nawalapitiya, Kandy, and to Colombo Fort that trains come from Badulla or Haputale. All trains that run on the main line stop at Hatton and the station handles a total of twelve trains daily.

Hatton railway station is the busiest railway station in the Nuwara Eliya District and the second-busiest railway station in the Central Province. Approximately 1 million passengers use the station during the pilgrimage period to Adam's Peak (Sri Pada) (which begins in December and ends in May). The station provides a large waiting room, located outside of the station, especially for visitors/pilgrims to Adams Peak. This facility is only open during the pilgrimage season. The Sri Lanka Transport Board also manages a joint railway-bus service for pilgrims.

== Timetable ==
Refer the Sri Lanka Railways website for train timetables. (http://www.eservices.railway.gov.lk/schedule/homeAction.action?lang=en)

== Continuity ==
Preceding station	Sri Lanka Railways	Following station
Rozella railway station	Main Line	Kotagala railway station
