= St. Margaret's Church, Kotagala =

St. Margaret's Church
- Location within Sri Lanka
- 6°56′24.4″N 80°37′35.2″E
- Location: Avissawella-Nuwara Eliya (A7) Highway, Kotagala, Sri Lanka
- Denomination: Anglican
- Website: St. Margaret's Church, Kotagala

History
- Consecrated: 15 April 1880

Architecture
- Functional status: Active
- Architectural type: Church
- Style: Victorian Gothic
- Groundbreaking: 1876

Administration
- Metropolis: Archbishop of Canterbury
- Diocese: Diocese of Colombo

Clergy
- Vicar: Rev. Edwin Raj

Archaeological Protected Monument of Sri Lanka
- Designated: 23 January 2009

St. Margaret's Church is a heritage listed 19th Century Anglican stone church in Kotagala, Sri Lanka.

== History ==
As the Dimbula and Dickoya Districts were brought under cultivation by coffee and subsequently tea plantations, church services were conducted in planter's bungalows or their coffee warehouses by visiting chaplains at infrequent intervals. On 25 September 1871, a meeting was held in Dimbula chaired by the Anglican Bishop of Colombo, Piers Claughton. At the meeting a unanimous decision was made that the district must have its own clergy and churches. Plans were them made to raise money for the construction of the churches and the provision for a chaplain's stipend.

Two sites were selected with one at Lindula and the other on top of a small knoll on the Forest Creek Estate, a coffee plantation in Kotagala. The Forest Creek Estate was established in 1870 by George Smith and Neil Gow. In 1898 it was taken over by Anglo-Ceylon and General Estates Co. Ltd.

The foundation stone for the church was laid in 1876 and was based on plans supplied by a London architect. The church, St. Margaret's, was formally dedicated on 15 April 1880 by Rev. William Henry Elton.

The first district chaplain was Rev. John Kemp, who came to Ceylon from State of Sarawak in Borneo, where he had been a chaplain and a missionary under the Society for the Propagation of the Gospel in Foreign Parts (SPG) for three years. He served as the Chaplain for Dimbula from 1873 to 1876. The first resident chaplain was the Rev. Francis W. C. Rigby who served from 1877 to 1889. He was succeeded by Rev. Edwin Bellerby from 1889 to 1890 and then Rev. C. E. Turner from 1891 to 1897.

A cemetery with tombstones of English colonial tea planters is located next to the church.

On 23 January 2009 the building was formally recognised by the Government as an Archaeological Protected Monument.

== See also ==
- List of Archaeological Protected Monuments in Nuwara Eliya District
