= Singha Malai Tunnel =

Railway tunnel in Sri Lanka

- Interactive map of Singha Malai Tunnel

Overview
- Official name: Tunnel No. 14
- Other name: Poolbank Tunnel
- Location: Hatton, Sri Lanka
- Coordinates: 6°53′52.85″N 80°36′16.23″E
- Status: Open
- Route: Main Line
- Start: Hatton
- End: Kotagala

Operation
- Constructed: F. W. Faviell
- Owner: Sri Lanka Railways
- Traffic: rail

Technical
- Design engineer: Guilford Lindsey Molesworth
- Length: 562 m (1,844 ft)
- Max elevation: 1,291 m
- Width: 5.5 m (18 ft)

Singha Malai Tunnel or Poolbank Tunnel is the second longest railway tunnel in Sri Lanka.

There are 46 tunnels along the Main Line between Colombo and Badulla. The longest tunnel is the Poolbank tunnel between Hatton and Kotagala, which is 562 m (1,844 ft) long, 5.5 m (18 ft) wide and has a curvature in the middle so that one end of the tunnel cannot be seen from the other. It was the longest railway tunnel in the county until the construction of Kakunadura tunnel at Nakuttiyagama, as part of the project to extend the railway line from Matara to Beliatta.In the middle of the tunnel the gradient begins to decline, as the Kotagala railway station is approximately 23 m (75 ft) lower than the Hatton railway station.

The tunnel was designed by Sir Guilford Lindsey Molesworth, the first Director-General of Railways in Ceylon (1865-1871) and constructed by F. W. Faviell. The tunnel's construction represented a significant engineering feat at the time, as it was bored from both ends meeting in the middle. The tunnel was named the Poolbank tunnel as it runs under the Poolbank tea estate, which was established in 1880. It is also called Singha Malai tunnel, after a nearby rock formation, Singha is Tamil for 'Lion' and Malai for 'Mountain'.
