= Nanu Oya (town) =

- Town
- Location within Sri Lanka
- Coordinates: 6°56′25″N 80°44′40″E
- Country: Sri Lanka
- Province: Central Province
- Elevation: 5,292 ft (1,613.1 m)
- Time zone: UTC+5:30 (Sri Lanka Standard Time)

Nanu Oya is a village in Sri Lanka, named after the Nanu Oya river. It is located within Nuwara Eliya District in the Central Province and is situated approximately 8 km (5.0 mi) away from Nuwara Eliya.

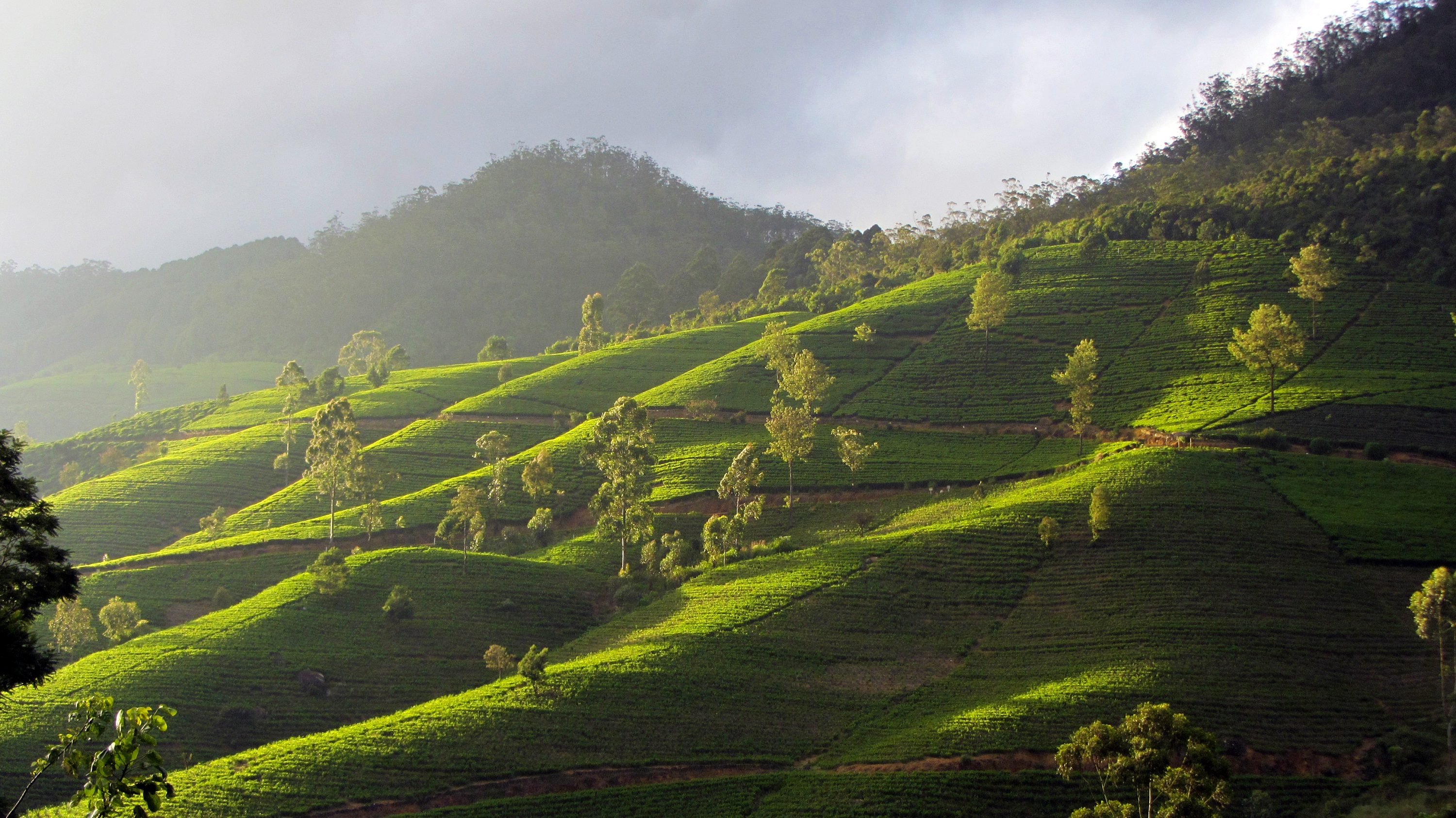
Tea plantations are a common sight in the area.

== See also ==
- Nanu Oya railway station
- List of towns in Central Province, Sri Lanka
