= Walapane Divisional Secretariat =

- Divisional Secretariat
- Country: Sri Lanka
- Province: Central Province
- District: Nuwara Eliya District
- Time zone: UTC+5:30 (Sri Lanka Standard Time)

Walapane Divisional Secretariat is a Divisional Secretariat of Nuwara Eliya District, of Central Province, Sri Lanka.

== Demography-Religion ==
Religion in Walapane DS Division (2012)
1. Buddhist (62.7%)
2. Hindu (33.1%)
3. Muslim (1.00%)
4. Roman Catholic (1.60%)
5. Other Christian (1.60%)
6. Other (0.00%)

== Grama Niladhari Divisions of Walapane ==
Division No.	Name
504	Watagepatha
504 A	Binganthalawa
504 B	Highforest
504 C	Alakolawewa
504 D	HighforestWatta
504 E	Kurunduoya
505	Napatawela
505 A	Padiyapelella
505 B	Ambagaspitiya
505 C	Galabada
505 D	Landupita
505 E	Wetekgama
506	Munwatta
506 A	Unagolla
506 B	LiyanwalaPahalagama
506 C	Mendakandura
506 D	LiyanwalaIhalagama
506 E	Madumana
506 F	Illukpalassa
507	Ukuthule
507 A	Ukuthule East
507 B	Yatiwella
513	Pannala
513 A	Serupitiya
513 B	Serasunthenna
513 C	Wewakale
513 D	IhalaPannala
513 E	Mailagasthanna
513 F	Andawala
514	Kumbalgamuwa
514 A	Naranthalawa
514 B	Kumbalgamuwa East
514 C	Mulhalkele
514 D	Thennehenwala
514 E	Daliwala North
514 F	Daliwala South
515	Batagolla
515 A	Manelwala
515 B	Walapane
515 C	Kandegama
515 D	Wathumulla
515 E	Mahauwa
516	Ketakandura
516 A	Kendagolla
516 B	EgodaKanda
516 C	WerallaPathana
516 D	Mahapathana
517	Thibbatugoda
517 A	Watambe
517 B	Thibbatugoda South
517 C	Rambuke
517 D	Aranpitiya
518	Udamadura
518 A	Kosgolla
518 B	Udamadura North
518 C	Galkadaela
518 D	Yatimadura
518 E	Thunhitiyawa
518 F	DemataArawa
