= Kotagala =

Kotagala කොටගල கொட்டக்கல்
- Town
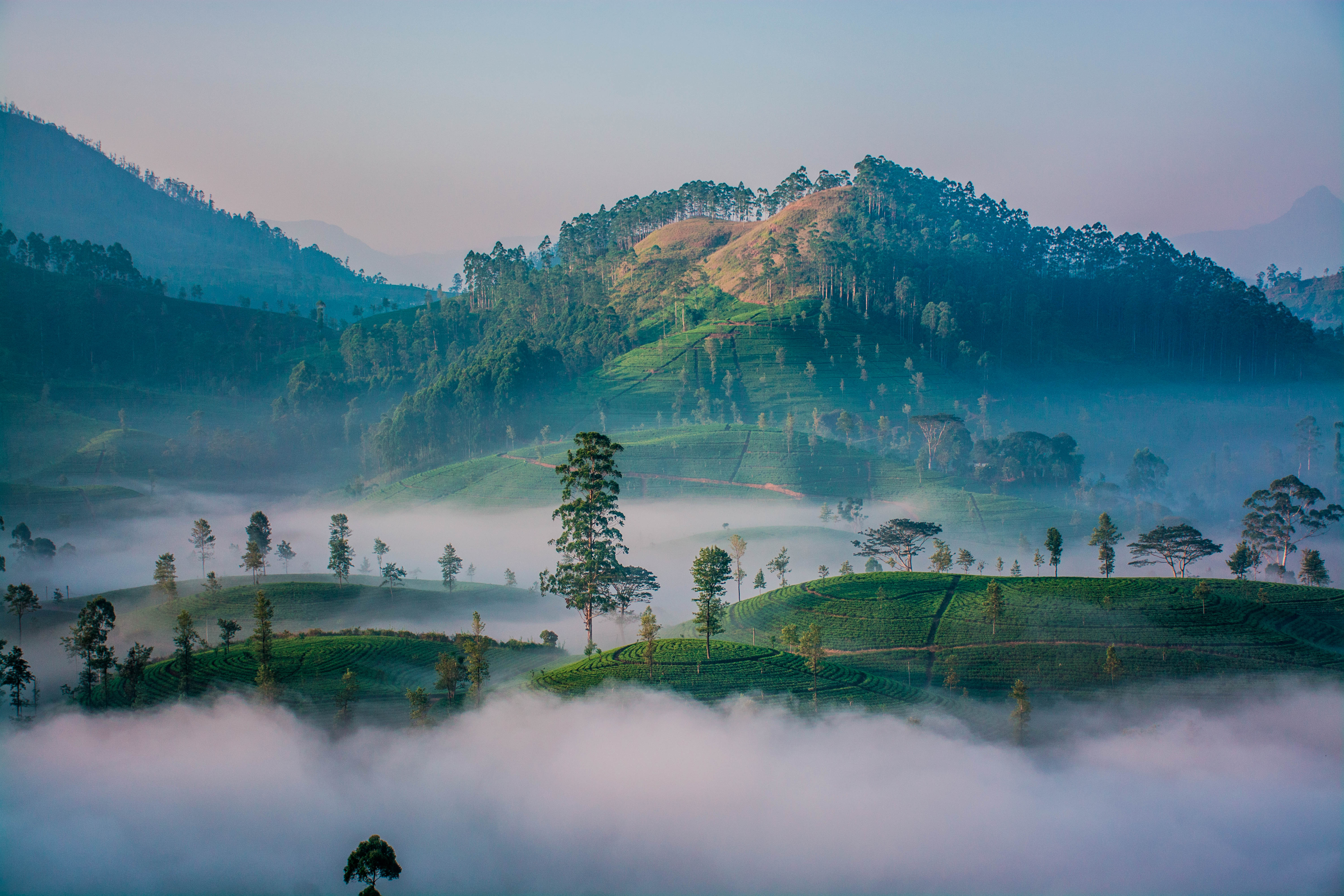
- Interactive map of Kotagala
- Coordinates: 06°55′47″N 80°36′17″E
- Country: Sri Lanka
- Province: Central Province
- District: Nuwara Eliya District
- Elevation: 1,247 m (4,091 ft)
- Time zone: UTC+5:30 (Sri Lanka Standard Time)
- Post code: 22080
- Area code: 051

Kotagala is a small town in the Nuwara Eliya District of the Central Province, Sri Lanka. It is located 35.8 km (22.2 mi) from Nuwara Eliya at an elevation of 1,247 m (4,091 ft) above sea level.

== Transport ==
It is serviced by the Kotagala railway station on the Main (Colombo-Badulla) railway line, which is 179.969 km (111.828 mi) from Colombo.

The town is located on the A7 (Avissawella-Nuwara Eliya highway), at the crossroads with the B406 (Stony Cliff - Kotagala road).

== Attractions ==
- Devon Falls, a 97 m (318 ft) high natural waterfall
- St. Clair's Falls, an 80 m (260 ft) high and 50 m (160 ft) wide waterfall
- Singha Malai Tunnel, the second longest railway tunnel in Sri Lanka (located between Hatton and Kotagala)
- 60 feet bridge, a 18.3 m (60 ft) long steel railway bridge (located between Hatton and Kotagala)
- St. Margaret's Church, a 19th-century stone church

== Education ==
- Kotagala Tamil Maha Vidyalayam
- Cambridge College
- Kotagala Teachers' Training College
- Kaarunya International School
- Smart Friend Academy (Abacus)

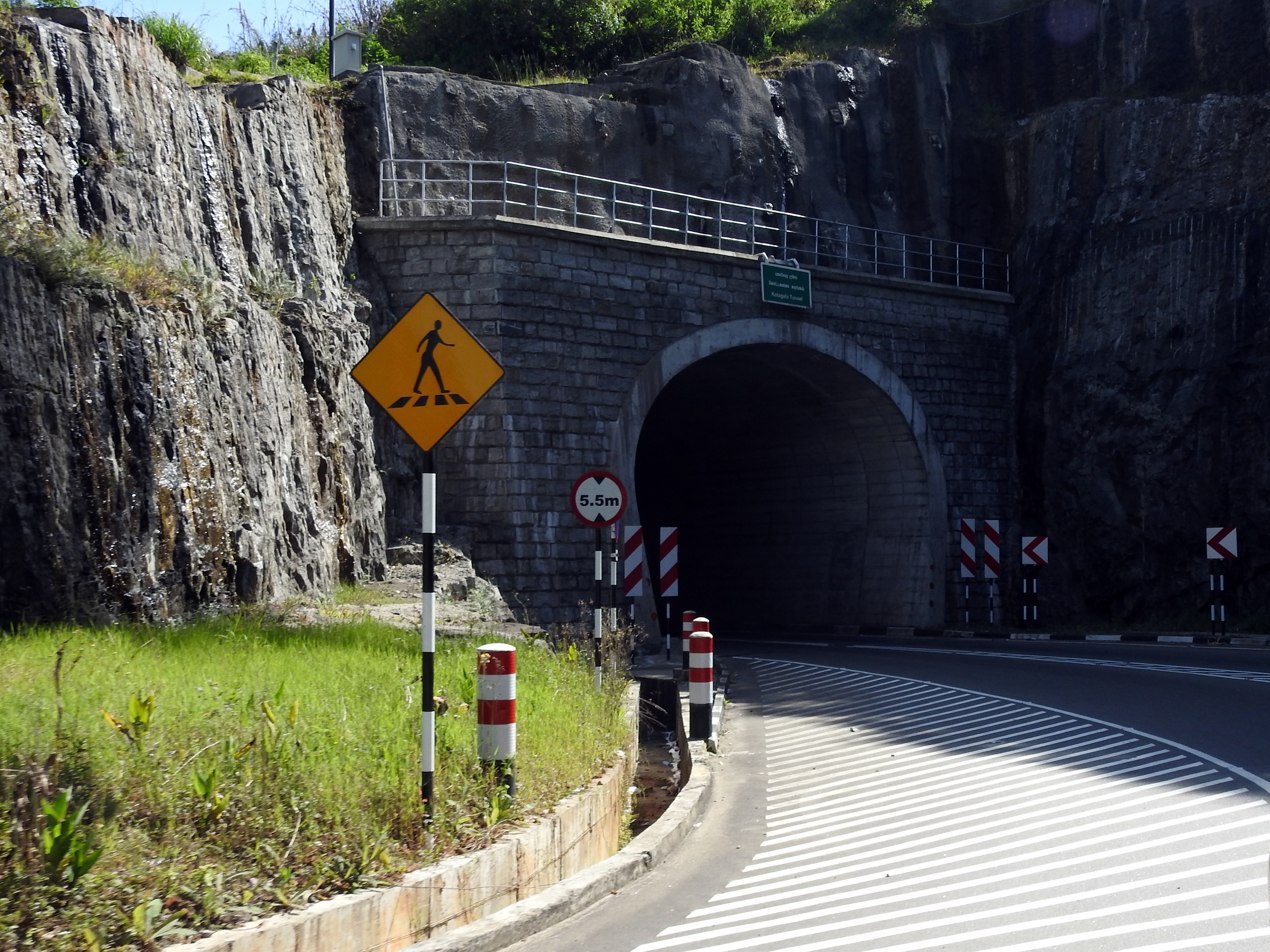
The Kotagala Tunnel in March 2018.

== See also ==
- List of towns in Central Province, Sri Lanka
