= Poramadulla Central College =

Public national school in Sri Lanka

Poramadulla Central College (පොරමඩුල්ල මධ්‍ය විද්‍යාලය)

Location
- Rikillagaskada, Hanguranketha; Central Province; Sri Lanka; 7.1406°N 80.7743°E

Information
- Type: Public
- Motto: පඤ්ඤාහි රතනං සෙට්ඨං paññāhi ratanan setthan (Pāli) Wisdom is the Greatest Jewel (Eng. Translation)
- Established: 1901
- School district: Nuwara Eliya
- Principal: A.C. Perera (From 2024)
- Grades: From Grade 6 to GCE A/L
- Enrollment: 3 000+
- Houses: · Vijaya · Gemunu · Thissa · Perakum
- Colors: Maroon and Yellow
- Website: poramadullacentralcollege.com

Poramadulla Central College (Sinhala: පොරමඩුල්ල මධ්‍ය විද්‍යලය) is a public national school in Rikillagaskada, Hanguranketha, Sri Lanka. Flanked by the Diyatalawa mount on one side and the Kandapola area on the other, the school serves as a sports school that helps train children talented in sports to improve and harness their skills.

The school provides secondary education.

== History ==
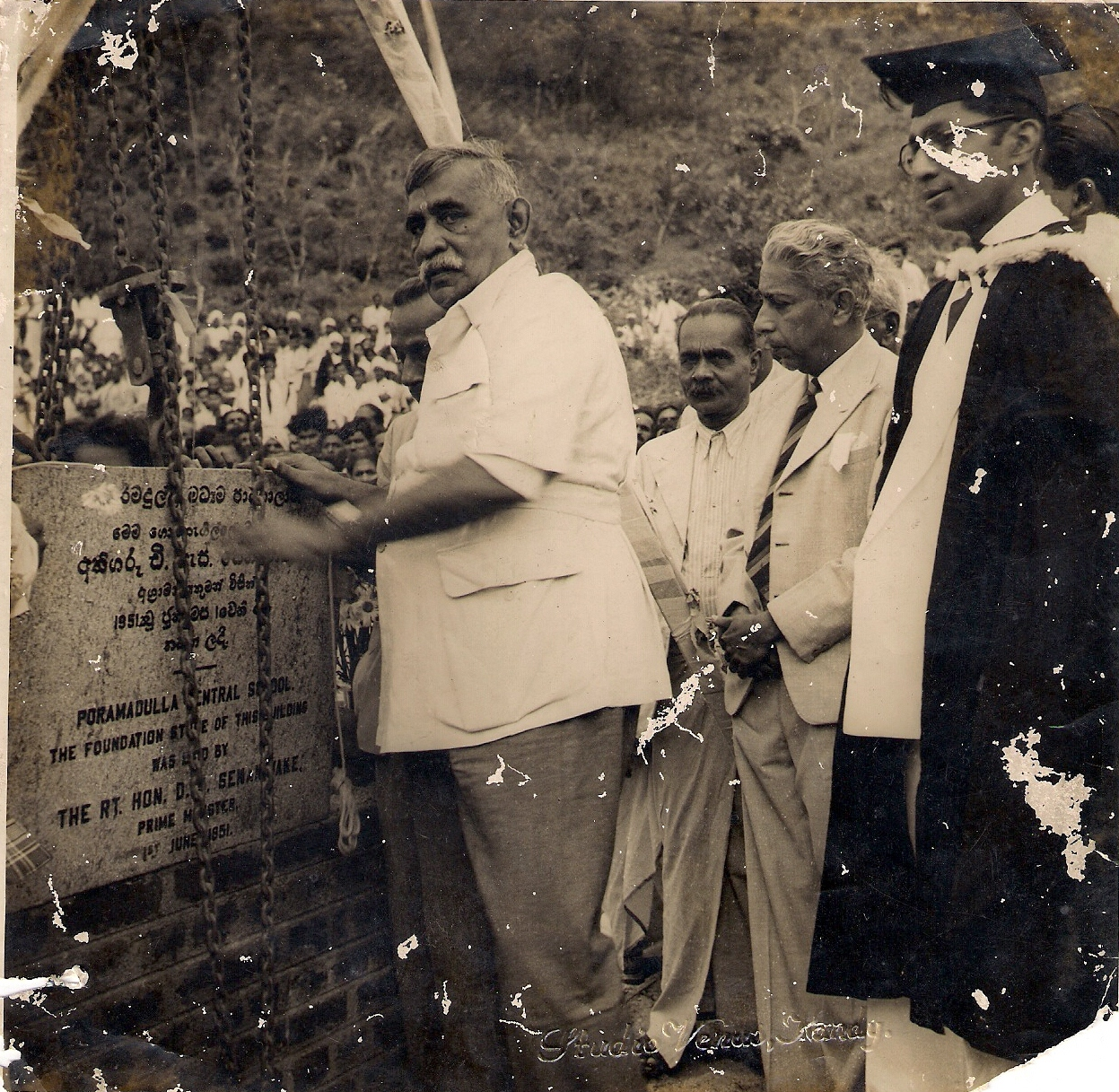
D. S. Senanayake laying the cornerstone.

Poramadulla Central College opened in Karandagolla in 1901. The school became a Bilingual school. At one point it moved to the campus of Poramadulla primary school. On 16 September 1945 the school was designated as a Central College due to a request from the villagers and principal M.D Gunawardhana. On 16 September 1945 the school began holding classes in its current facility. The school's website stated that "it is believed that girls' hostel is the [“Opatha walawwa" (Mahagedara walawwa)] [at present]."

The current main building opened on 15 November 1956. In 1957 the girls' hostel opened in the main building and a boys' hostel opened during the same year. In 1957 the girls' hostel moved to "Opatha walawwa". In 1959, The college's magazine "Vidueliya magazine" (විදු එළිය) began publication,. and a gymnasium and open theatre opened in 1962.

== Athletics, activities, and clubs ==
The school's athletic programs include badminton, basketball, cricket, hockey, karate, netball, volleyball, and wrestling. The school was one of the first in the Nuwara Eliya District to play hard ball cricket.

In October 2010, the Sri Lankan sports minister, C. B. Rathnayake, announced that the ministry would develop and upgrade the sports facilities on the college grounds. The grounds, first developed in 1998 by then sports & youth affairs minister and one of the renowned past pupil of the school, Hon. S. B. Dissanayaka, esq., as it was designed as a national sports ground by him so that all sports could be played, including volleyball, cricket, football, table tennis, badminton, netball, and basketball. and a fully equipped indoor badminton court also constructed by him during his time as a part of the future national level sports complex. the same minister Mr. Dissanayaka went further into put up a school poultry farm as well with the ministry fund to provide nutritious meals for the pupils of the same sports school too. When that field fell into disrepair, the cricket team began to play its home matches at a local prison camp. However, in fairness to the former minister S. B. Dissanayaka it has to be mentioned here that the assistance he provided to the school cricket team with the intention of transforming the college to a leading cricket playing school was commendable and already gone to the history of the school too.

The school offers education in both English and Sinhala Medium

In addition the school has a chess team. Clubs held by the school include the Air Force cadet corps, the Army Cadets corps, Boy Scouts, the Eastern Band, the English Literary Association, the Girl Guiding Group, Mahavali Environment Project Group, the Photographic Association, IT society, AI club, Red Cross Society, Science Society, Sinhala Literary Association, St. John's Ambulance Service Society, and the Western Band.

The Science Society of Poramadulla Central College was officially established on 17 July 2025 by a group of students of the 2026 Advanced Level Science Batch under the guidance of the school's science teachers. The society was founded with the objective of promoting scientific knowledge, practical learning, and student participation in science-related educational activities. Since its establishment, the society has organized a number of academic and outreach programmes aimed at supporting science education within the school and the surrounding community.

Among its early initiatives was "Mehewara", an educational assistance programme conducted for Ordinary Level students. The society has also organized science practical exhibitions to enhance students' understanding of practical components of the O/L Science curriculum. In addition, members of the society have participated in outreach programmes in schools within the region experiencing shortages of science teachers, providing academic support to students in completing subject content. The society has further contributed to the organization and promotion of Science Day activities at Poramadulla Central College. It functions with the approval of the school administration and the Principal and is registered with the All Island Science Society Association.
