= Holy Emmanuel Church, Hanguranketha =

- Location within Sri Lanka
- 7.1722655°N 80.77878°E
- Location: Haragama Road, Hanguranketha, Sri Lanka
- Denomination: Anglican
- Website: The Diocese of Kurunagala

History
- Consecrated: 1886

Architecture
- Functional status: Active
- Architectural type: Church
- Style: Victorian Gothic

Administration
- Metropolis: Archbishop of Canterbury
- Diocese: Diocese of Kurunegala

Archaeological Protected Monument of Sri Lanka
- Designated: 6 July 2007

Holy Emmanuel Church (Sinhala: හඟුරන්කෙත ශුද්ධ එමානුවෙල් දේවස්ථානය) is an Anglican stone church, located in Hanguranketha. The church was constructed in 1886 by Charles Henry de Soysa and is one of the oldest churches in the district. It is located approximately 4 km (2.5 mi) south of the town centre, adjoining Hanguranketha C. C. Vidyalaya.

In 1834 the Church Mission Society established a Christian missionary school in Hanguranketha, the school is now known as Hanguranketha C. C. Vidyalaya (Sinhala: හගුරන්කෙත සීසී විද්‍යාලය). In 1855, Reverend E. T. Higgins, a missionary and representative of the Diocese of Colombo, came to Haguranketha and proposed that a church be built near the school site. The land adjacent to the school was donated by the landowners, Mr. Gammuladani and Mr. Wijeratne. On 4 August 1880, Mudaliyar Susew de Soysa, the brother of Gate Mudaliyar Jeronis de Soysa, built a semi-permanent building, which was used for worshipping by the locals. Following his death in 1881, his nephew, Charles Henry de Soysa, donated sufficient funds to complete the construction of a permanent church building, which was furbished with an altar and wooden pews. Following de Soysa's death in 1890, his wife, Catherine, donated the funds to build and furnish a rectory, to house the church priest. The de Soysa family, whilst Buddhist, were well known for their philanthropic works in the district, financially supporting and establishing hospitals, schools, roads and churches. In 1826 Jeronis de Soysa, purchased his first estate, 195 ha (482 acres), in Hanguranketha, the first Ceylonese to establish a coffee plantation in the district.

In 1938 a new bell tower was built, by Father Don Lewis Welikala, who became the church's first Sinhalese priest. In 1944 C. S. Koraya started a weaving centre near the church.

On 6 July 2007 the church building was formally recognised by the Government as an Archaeological Protected Monument.

== See also ==
- Holy Emmanuel Church, Moratuwa
