= Ginigathena =

Coordinates: 6°59′N 80°29′E

- town
- Interactive map of Ginigathena
- Country: Sri Lanka
- Province: Central
- District: Nuwara Eliya
- Time zone: UTC+5:30 (Sri Lanka Standard Time)

Ginigathena is a small town in Sri Lanka located within Central Province in the Nuwara Eliya District. It is the central point to reach Hatton and Nawalapitiya. The Beauty of Tea Estates of Nuwara Eliya District starts from Ginigathena. Ginigathena is populated with Sinhalese and Tamils. Aberdeen Falls, one of the least known waterfalls of Sri Lanka is situated in Ginigathena. One of the very few real tree houses and the only pine tree house of Sri Lanka, "The Tree House" and Hotel Breeta's Garden also situated in Ginigathena. Ginigathena has the majesty of accumulating the branches of Kelani and Mahaweli rivers.

== Climate ==
Ginigathena receives the highest rainfall in Sri Lanka.

Climate data for Ginigathhena
Month	Jan	Feb	Mar	Apr	May	Jun	Jul	Aug	Sep	Oct	Nov	Dec	Year
Mean daily maximum °C (°F)	26.8 (80.2)	28.4 (83.1)	29.9 (85.8)	29.9 (85.8)	28.8 (83.8)	27.6 (81.7)	27.3 (81.1)	27.5 (81.5)	27.9 (82.2)	27.5 (81.5)	27.2 (81.0)	26.6 (79.9)	28.0 (82.3)
Daily mean °C (°F)	22.3 (72.1)	23.1 (73.6)	24.2 (75.6)	24.6 (76.3)	24.6 (76.3)	23.9 (75.0)	23.6 (74.5)	23.7 (74.7)	23.5 (74.3)	23.3 (73.9)	23 (73)	22.4 (72.3)	23.5 (74.3)
Mean daily minimum °C (°F)	17.8 (64.0)	17.8 (64.0)	18.5 (65.3)	19.4 (66.9)	20.4 (68.7)	20.2 (68.4)	19.9 (67.8)	19.9 (67.8)	19.1 (66.4)	19.1 (66.4)	18.8 (65.8)	18.3 (64.9)	19.1 (66.4)
Average precipitation mm (inches)	109 (4.3)	98 (3.9)	164 (6.5)	282 (11.1)	414 (16.3)	480 (18.9)	411 (16.2)	375 (14.8)	351 (13.8)	408 (16.1)	382 (15.0)	203 (8.0)	3,677 (144.9)
Source: Climate-Data.org

== See also ==
- List of towns in Central Province, Sri Lanka
