= Hanguranketha =

Hanguranketha හඟුරන්කෙත அங்குரன்கெதை
- Town
- Location within Sri Lanka
- Coordinates: 7.1773°N 80.7760°E
- Country: Sri Lanka
- Province: Central Province
- District: Nuwara Eliya
- Divisional Secretariat: Hanguranketha
- Time zone: UTC+5:30 (Sri Lanka Standard Time Zone)
  - Summer (DST): UTC+6 (Summer time)
- Post Code: 20710

Hanguranketha (Sinhala: හඟුරන්කෙත, romanized: Han̆guranketa; Tamil: அங்குரன்கெதை, romanized: Aṅkuraṉketai) is a town in the Nuwara Eliya District, Central Province of Sri Lanka.

It is approximately 29 km (18 mi) southeast of Kandy and 106 km (66 mi) northeast of Colombo and located on the B413 Road.

== History ==
The name of the town is purportedly derived from Sangaruwan Ketha, a thriving paddy field. The location was also known as Diyatillakepura, a camping site of a number of Kings of Kandy during the various Chola invasions. Hanguranketha was used on numerous occasions as the temporary capital of the Kingdom of Kandy

King Senarath was the first king to build a royal palace in Hanguranketha.

His son, King Rajasinghe II, erected a royal palace, audience hall and several other buildings in Hanguranketha, as well as a constructing a lake, Udamaluwa, making it the site of his summer palace. According to Robert Knox's An Historical Relation of the Island Ceylon, the city had been surrounded by a whitewashed protective wall, which encircled the large two-storied palaces. The entrance of the palace had two beautifully carved doors and door panels. Rajasinghe was cremated at Hanguranketha following his death in 1687 and his ashes were deposited at a site near Adahanamaluwa Gedige Viharaya.

In 1814 King Sri Vikrama Rajasinha fled to the safety of Hanguranketha when the Sinhalese aristocracy torched his palace in Kandy.

The palace was completely destroyed in the Uwa Wellassa Great Rebellion in 1818. Only two buildings still exist from that era, the Maha Vishnu Devalaya and the Pothgul Maliga Maha Viharaya. Following the 1818 Rebellion, the remains of the destroyed palace were used in the construction of the present Viharaya, with a large hall for the library built during 1831-1880. The stone carved door frames, moon-stone slab and stone pillars belonging to the royal palace have been incorporated into the Viharaya building. The Devalaya was used as a troop garrison by the British following the rebellion.

== Attractions ==
- Gala Uda fortress
- Pothgul Maliga Maha Viharaya
- Maha Vishnu Devalaya
- Kitulpe Ranpatge Vihara
- Medapitiye Arattanaya
- Holy Emmanuel Church

== See also ==
- List of towns in Central Province, Sri Lanka
