= Kothmale Divisional Secretariat =

- Divisional Secretariat
- Interactive map of Kothmale Divisional Secretariat
- Country: Sri Lanka
- Province: Central Province
- District: Nuwara Eliya District
- Time zone: UTC+5:30 (Sri Lanka Standard Time)

Kothmale Divisional Secretariat is a Divisional Secretariat of Nuwara Eliya District, of Central Province, Sri Lanka.

== Demography-Religion ==
Religion in Kothmale DS Division (2012)
1. Buddhist (52.3%)
2. Hindu (36.5%)
3. Muslim (7.20%)
4. Roman Catholic (2.40%)
5. Other Christian (1.60%)
6. Other (0.00%)
