= Kalaweldeniya =

Coordinates: 6°57′N 80°30′E

- Village
- Interactive map of Kalaweldeniya
- Country: Sri Lanka
- Province: Central Province
- Time zone: UTC+5:30 (Sri Lanka Standard Time)

Kalaweldeniya is a village in Sri Lanka. It is located within the Central Province of Sri Lanka.

== See also ==
- List of towns in Central Province, Sri Lanka
