= Padiyapelella =

- Village
- Interactive map of Padiyapelella
- Coordinates: 7°05′31″N 80°47′53″E
- Country: Sri Lanka
- Province: Central Province
- Time zone: UTC+5:30 (Sri Lanka Standard Time)

Padiyapelella is a town in Sri Lanka. It is located 45 km (28 mi) away from Kandy and situated within Central Province.

== See also ==
- List of towns in Central Province, Sri Lanka
