= Nuwara Eliya Divisional Secretariat =

- Divisional Secretariat
- Location within Sri Lanka
- Country: Sri Lanka
- Province: Central Province
- District: Nuwara Eliya District
- Time zone: UTC+5:30 (Sri Lanka Standard Time)

Nuwara Eliya Divisional Secretariat is a Divisional Secretariat of Nuwara Eliya District, of Central Province, Sri Lanka.

== Demography-Religion ==
Religion in Nuwara Eliya DS Division (2012)
1. Buddhist (18.7%)
2. Hindu (67.7%)
3. Muslim (3.20%)
4. Roman Catholic (7.50%)
5. Other Christian (2.80%)
6. Other (0.00%)
