= Rikillagaskada =

Coordinates: 7°09′N 80°47′E

- Village
- Interactive map of Rikillagaskada
- Country: Sri Lanka
- Province: Central Province
- Time zone: UTC+5:30 (Sri Lanka Standard Time)

Rikillagaskada is a village in Sri Lanka. It is located within Central Province.

Poramadulla Central College is located in the village.

== See also ==
- List of towns in Central Province, Sri Lanka
