= Nuwara Eliya Racecourse =

Horse racing venue in Sri Lanka

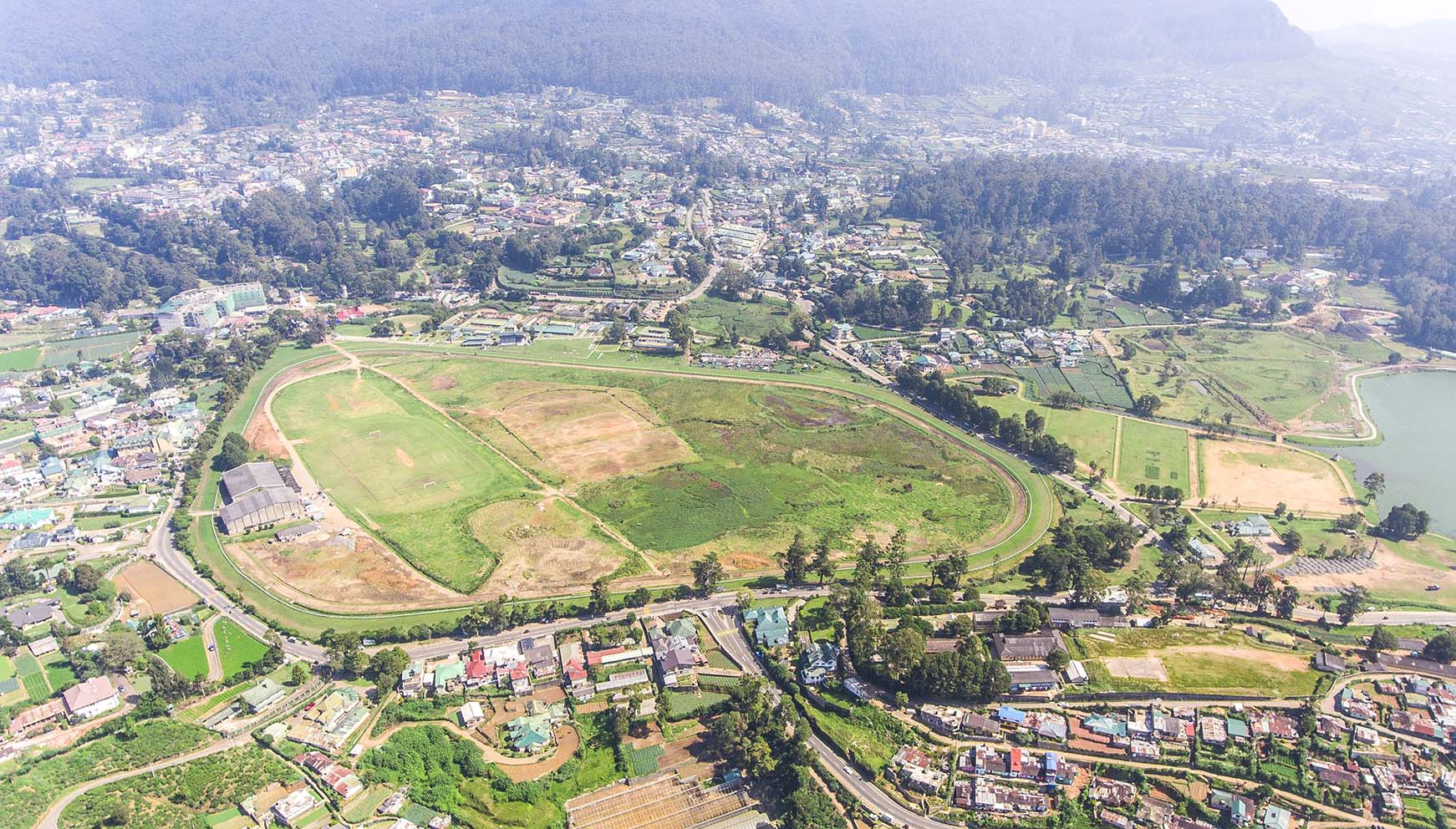
- Nuwara Eliya Racecourse in 2016
- Interactive map of Nuwara Eliya Racecourse
- Location: Nuwara Eliya, Sri Lanka
- Coordinates: 6°57′47″N 80°46′09″E
- Owned by: Sports Ministry
- Date opened: 1875
- Course type: Flat
- Notable races: Governor's Cup; Queen's Cup; Independence Cup; RTC Magic Million Cup

Nuwara Eliya Racecourse in Nuwara Eliya, Sri Lanka is the only remaining horse racing venue in Sri Lanka. Situated 1,868 metres (6,129 ft) above sea level the race course is one of the highest in the world. The track has a circumference of 1,800 metres (5,900 ft) (approx. 9 furlongs) with a 333-metre straight.

== History ==
John Baker, the brother of Samuel Baker, is credited for introducing horse racing to Nuwara Eliya, when in the 1840s he created a training course for his imported English thoroughbreds on a hill close to his home.

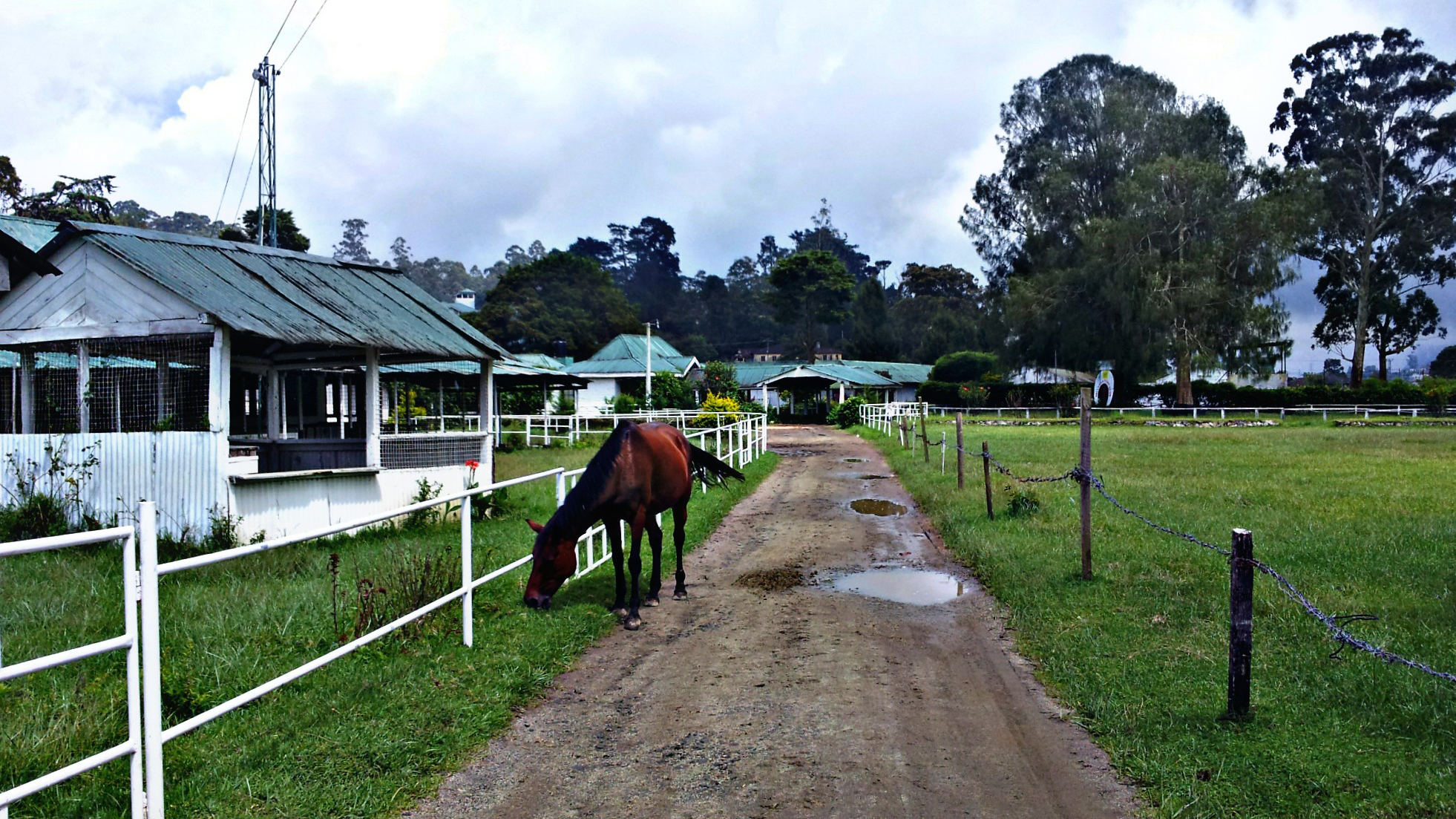
Racecourse, Nuwara Eliya

The inaugural race meeting at Nuwara Eliya was held in 1875 and was organised by the Nuwara Eliya Gymkhana Club. These meetings carried on intermittently until 1900 when the current racecourse was laid out.

In 1910, in a meeting presided over by the Governor of Ceylon, Sir Henry Edward McCallum (1852–1919), it was resolved that the Colombo-based Ceylon Turf Club would be in a better position to manage the Nuwara Eliya course and the race meets, as it had greater financial clout, the ability to offer better prizes and was able to make improvements to the course and its buildings. The upper tiers of the modest but historic grandstand housed the race stewards, members and other assorted VIPs, giving them the best view over the course. Outside of the racing calendar, the town library was located in the ground floor of the grandstand. Horse racing in Sri Lanka peaked in the 1950s.

In 1956 horse racing was banned in Sri Lanka, with the historic Colombo Racecourse in Cinnamon Gardens, Colombo together with the Nuwara Eliya course both closing. The Colombo Racecourse was subsequently converted into an international rugby venue, so when horse racing returned to Sri Lanka in 1981 the Nuwara Eliya Racecourse became the only surviving race track in the country.

In August 2011, the Sports Ministry took over the ownership of the Nuwara Eliya Racecourse from the Sri Lanka Turf Club. The racecourse is now managed by the Sugathadasa National Sports Complex Authority, with race meetings being conducted by the Sri Lanka Turf Club.

== Races ==
Five horse racing meets are held in Nuwara Eliya during the April season. Meets are also held in August and December. The most prestigious race being the Governor's Cup, a 9 furlong race for Class I thoroughbreds, which is held on the Sinhalese New Year (generally 14 April) and was first contested in 1833.

Month	Race	Distance	Category
Feb	Independence Cup	1,800m (9 furlongs)	Class I thoroughbreds
Apr	Governor's Cup	1,800m (9 furlongs)	Class I thoroughbreds
Apr	Queen's Cup	2,000m (10 furlongs)	Class II thoroughbreds
Apr	RTC Magic Million Cup	1,800m (9 furlongs)	Class I thoroughbreds
Aug	Brown's Cup	1,400m (7 furlongs)	Class I thoroughbreds
Dec	Mayor's Cup	1,400m (7 furlongs)	Class I thoroughbreds (handicap)
