= Bogawantalawa =

Coordinates: 6°47′N 80°40′E

Bogawantalawa, also spelt Bhagavanthalava, is a small town in the Central province of Sri Lanka. It is at 1514 m elevation above sea level, about 150 km (93 mi) east of Colombo, famous for its tea estates. Most refer it to as Bogawantalawa - however the correct spelling and pronunciation is Bhagavantalava - meaning place where the blessed lived (Sinhala: බගවන්තලාව - භාග්‍යවතුන් වැඩසිටි තලාව (Bhagyavathun vadasiti thalava).

== Tea ==
The majority of tea estates in the area are managed by Bogawantalawa Tea Estates Ltd (BPL Teas). The prominence of the name of the company may have helped the erroneous spelling and name of the town.

Bogawantalawa Tea Estates PLC engages in the cultivation, processing, manufacture, and sale of tea. The company's products include black, green, white, herbal, organic, and flavored teas. It offers its products in the form of string and tea bags, as well as in tins and wooden boxes. The company was formerly known as Bogawantalawa Plantations Limited and changed its name to Bogawantalawa Tea Estates PLC in April 2008. The company was incorporated in 1992 and is based in Colombo, Sri Lanka. Bogawantalawa Tea Estates PLC is a subsidiary of Metropolitan Resource Holdings PLC.

BPL Teas is the largest Sri Lankan supplier of iced tea to the USA. Since 2004, Walters Bay-BPL Teas has continuously received the best iced tea award at the World Tea Expo.

BPL Teas develops products for private labels in addition to exporting their products under the brand Ceylon Tea Gardens.
