= Nuwara Eliya District =

Nuwara Eliya District நுவரெலியா மாவட்டம் නුවරඑළිය දිස්ත්‍රික්කය
- Administrative District
- Map of Sri Lanka with Nuwara Eliya District highlighted
- Coordinates: 7°00′N 80°45′E
- Country: Sri Lanka
- Province: Central Province
- Largest Town: Nuwara Eliya
- Divisions: List: Divisional Secretariats: 5; Grama Niladhari: 491

Government
  - District Secretary: M. B. R. Pushpakumara
  - Local: List: Municipal Councils: 1; Urban Councils: 2; Pradeishiya Sabhas: 5

Area
  - Total: 1,741 km^{2} (672 sq mi)
  - Land: 1,706 km^{2} (659 sq mi)
  - Water: 35 km^{2} (14 sq mi)

Population (2013)
  - Total: 731,415
  - Density: 428.7/km^{2} (1,110/sq mi)
- Time zone: UTC+05:30 (Sri Lanka)
- ISO 3166 code: LK-23

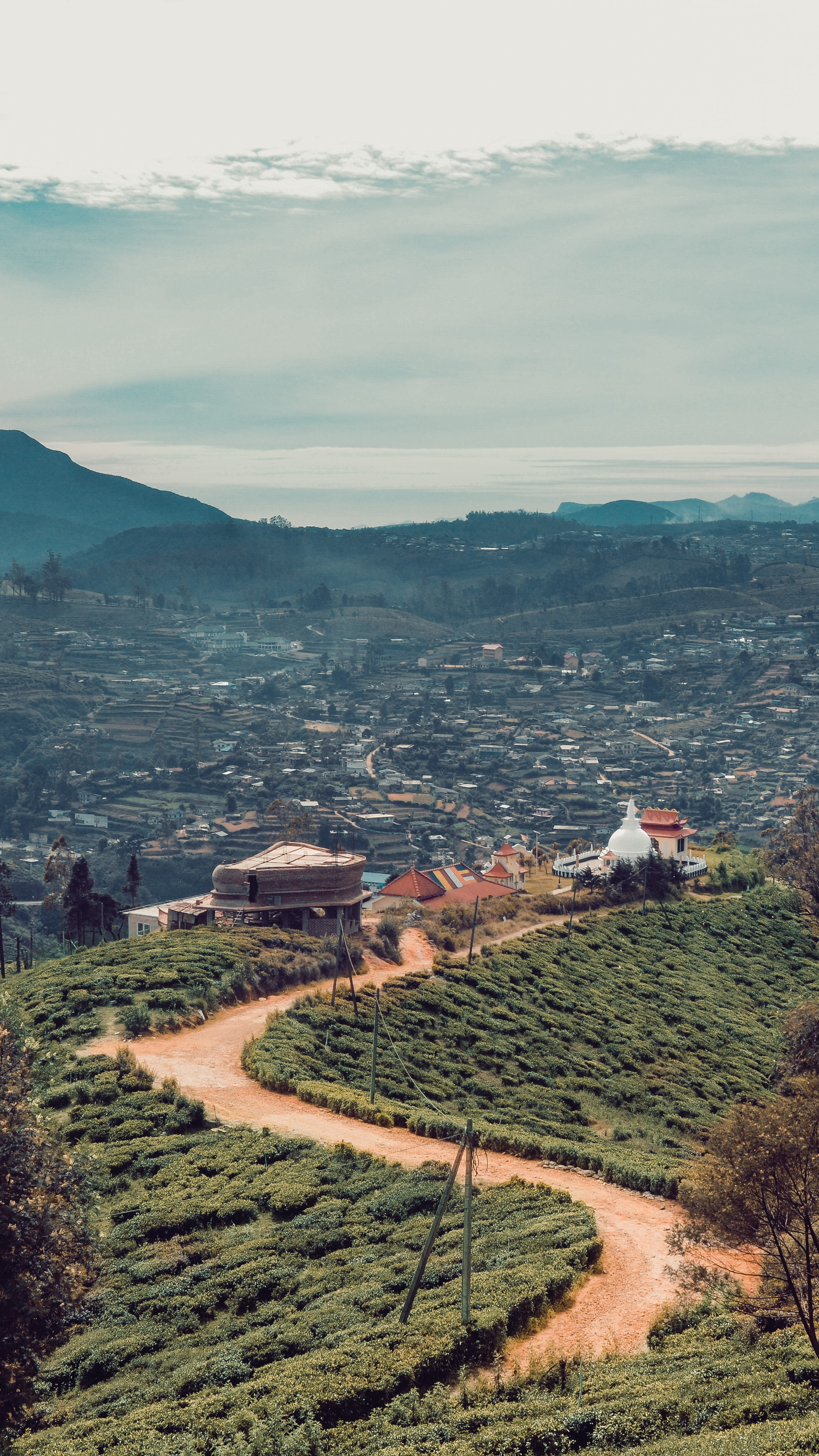
Nuwara Eliya, Sri Lanka

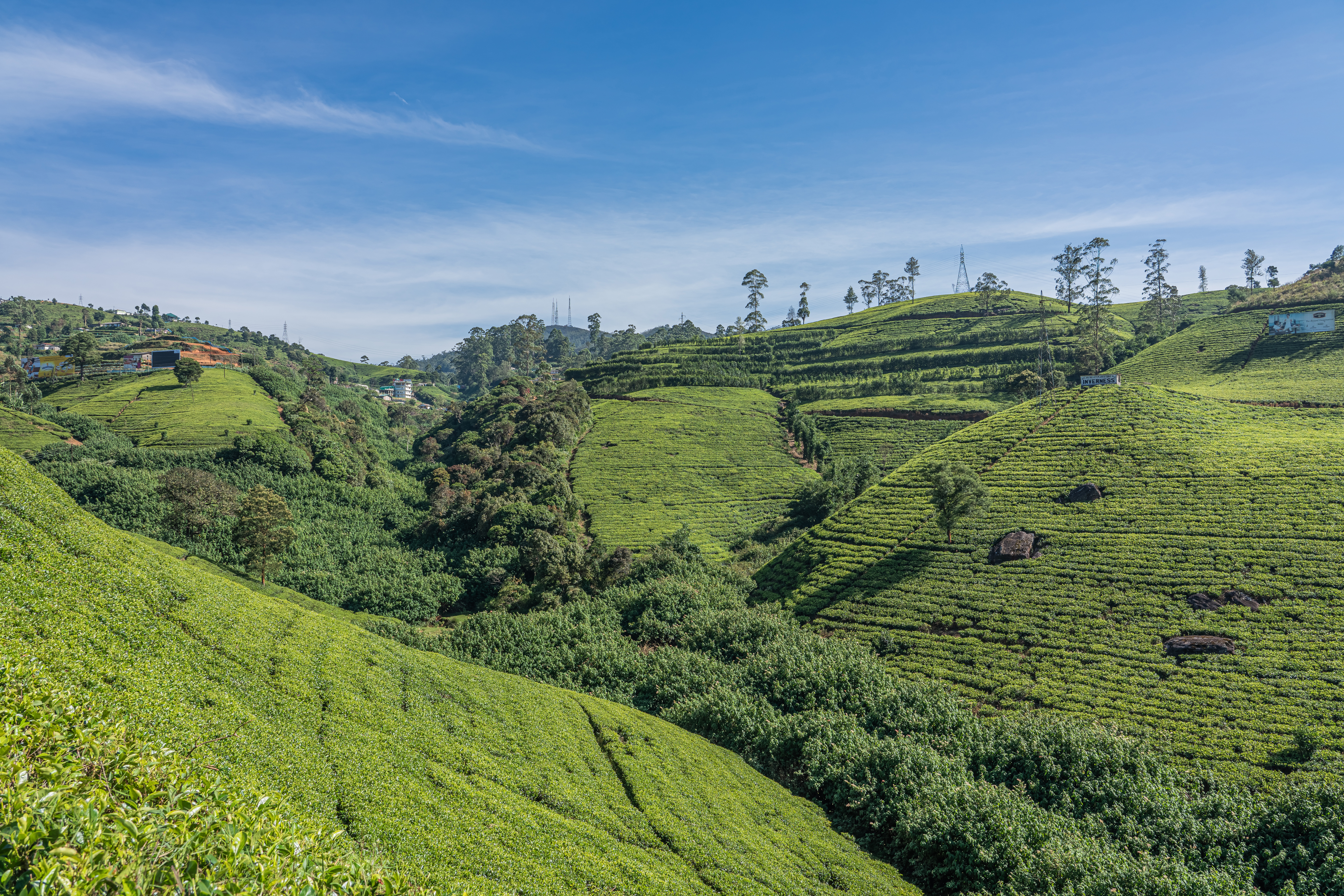
Labukele tea field at Nuwara Eliya District

Nuwara Eliya District (Tamil: நுவரெலியா மாவட்டம், romanized: Nuvareliyā Māvaṭṭam; Sinhala: නුවරඑළිය දිස්ත්‍රික්කය, romanized: Nuvaraeḷiya Distrikkaya) is a district in Central Province, Sri Lanka, centered on the tourist city of Nuwara Eliya.

== Geography ==
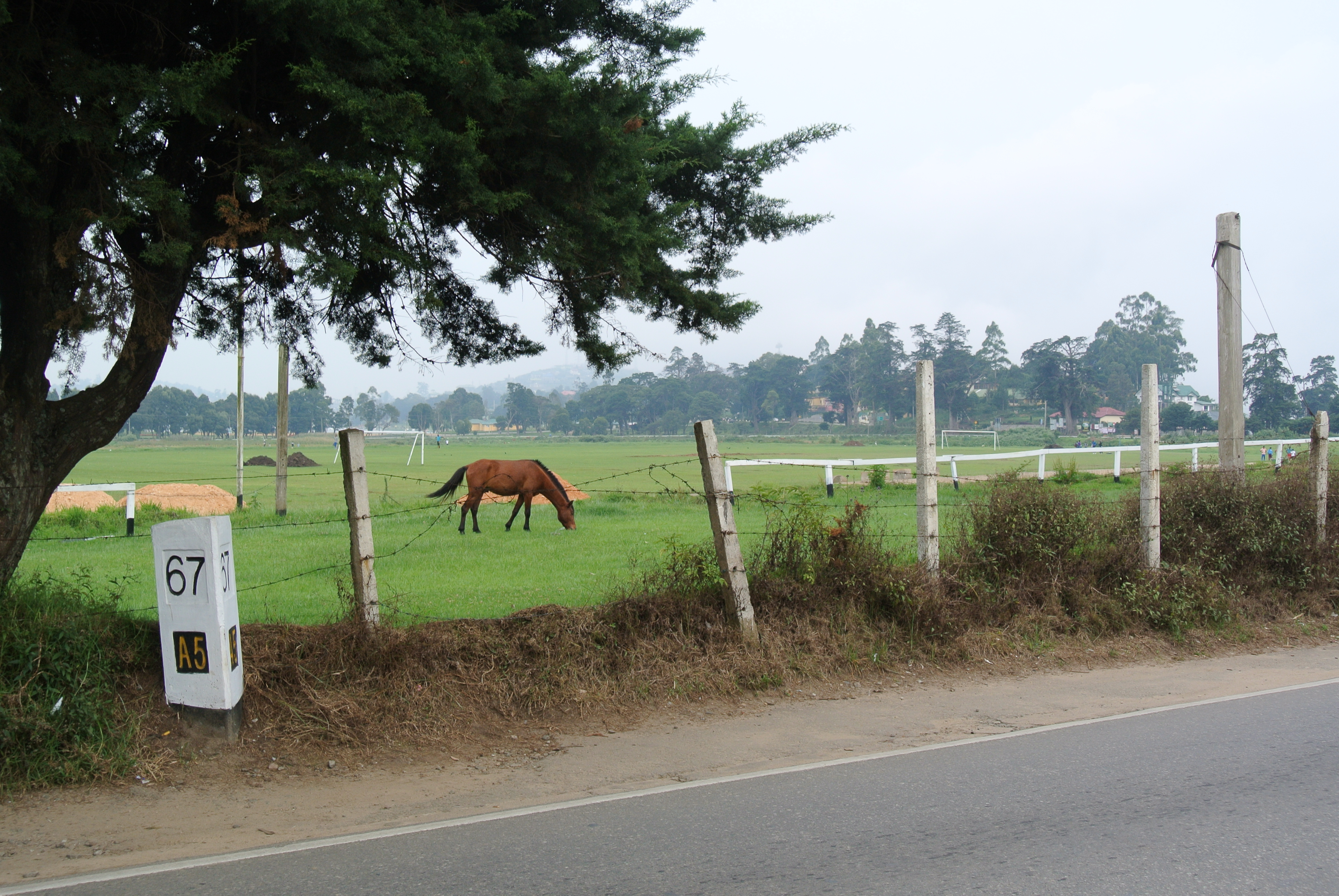
Marker on the A5 highway in Nuwara Eliya, horse and Race Course in the background

Nuwara Eliya district is located in the hill country of Central Province. The terrain is generally mountainous, with deep valleys.

== Cities ==
- Nuwara Eliya (Municipal Council)

== Towns ==
- Agrapatana
- Ambewela
- Bogawantalawa
- Bopattalawa
- Dayagama Pasar
- Ginigathena
- Hapugastalawa
- Haggala
- Hanguranketha
- Hatton-Dikoya UC
- Kotagala
- Kotmale
- Labukele
- Laxapana
- Lindula-Talawakele UC
- Maskeliya
- Nildandahinna
- Nuwara Eliya
- Nanu Oya
- Norton Bridge
- Padiyapelella
- Ramboda
- Ragala
- Rikillagaskada
- Rozella
- Udapussallawa
- Walapane
- Watawala
- Norton
- Koththallena
- Pundaluoya
- Kandapola
- Pattipola

== Demographics ==
Ethnic groups
Indian Tamil	355,830	(50.57%)
Sinhalese	282,621	(40.17%)
Sri Lankan Tamil	46,066	(6.55%)
Sri Lankan Moor	16,555	(2.35%)
Burgher	632	(0.09%)
Sri Lankan Malay	1,059	(0.15%)
Other	847	(0.12%)

Religions
Hinduism	359,135	(51.04%)
Buddhism	279,139	(39.67%)
Islam	19,099	(2.71%)
Roman Catholic	35,008	(4.98%)
Other Christian	10,741	(1.53%)
Other	488	(0.07%)

According to the 2001 census of Sri Lanka, population of Nuwara Eliya district is 703,610, of which 50.57% are Tamils of Indian origin, 40.17% Sinhalese, 6.55% Sri Lankan Tamils and 2.35% Sri Lankan Moors. In terms of religion, 51.04% of the population are Hindu, 39.67% Buddhists, 4.98% Roman Catholics, 2.71% Muslims and 1.53% belong to non-catholic Christian denominations.

== Schools ==
Poramadulla Central College is located in the Rikillagaskada community in Hanguranketha.

Diyathilaka Central College is located in the Hanguranketha community in Hanguranketha.
