= Central Province, Sri Lanka =

Province of Sri Lanka

Central Province මධ්‍යම පළාත மத்திய மாகாணம்
- Province
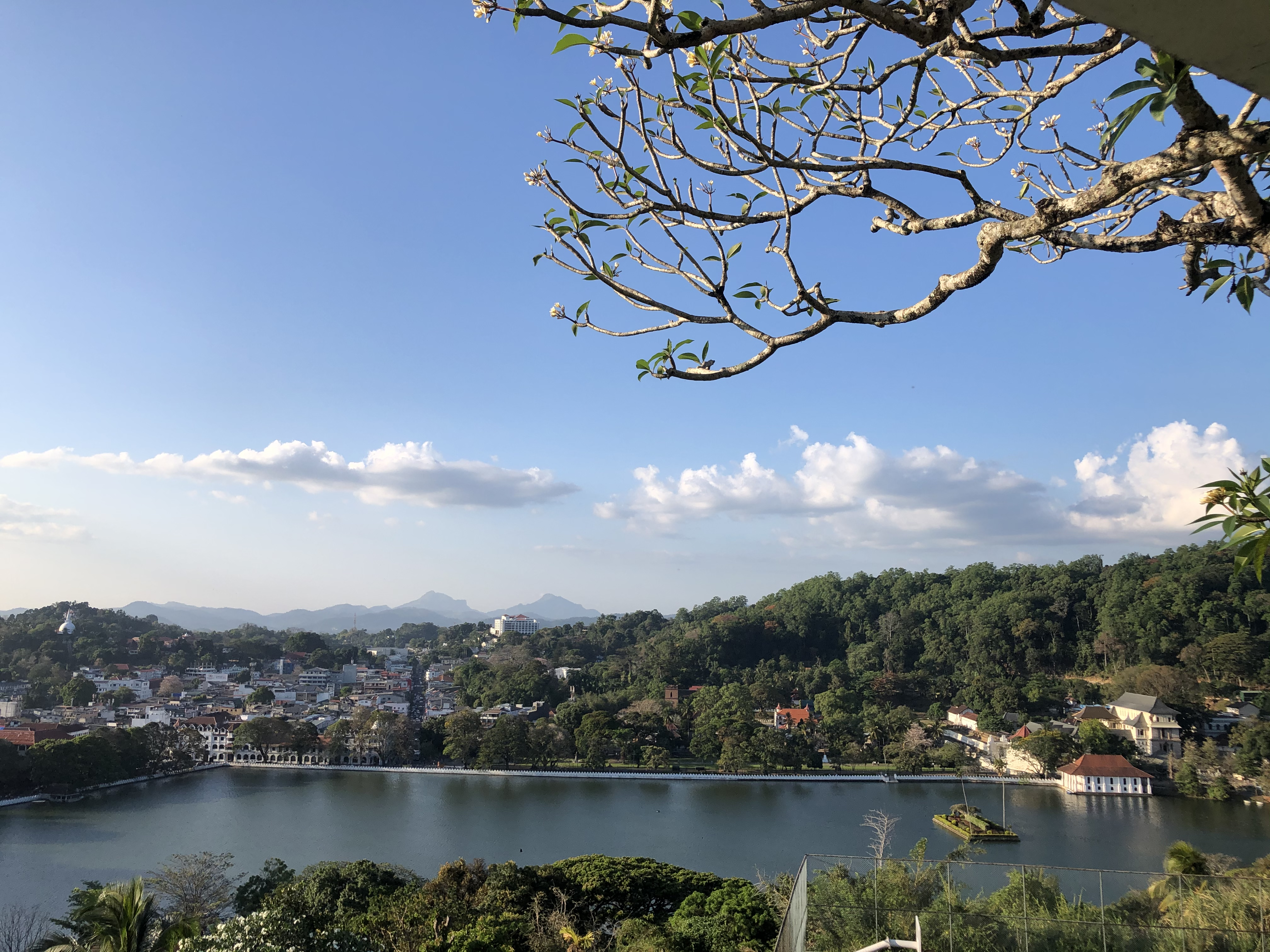
- Kandy (capital city of the province)

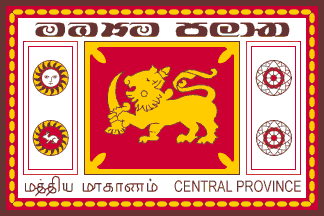
- Flag

- Location within Sri Lanka
- Coordinates: 7°20′N 80°45′E
- Country: Sri Lanka
- Created: 1833
- Admitted: 14 November 1987
- Capital: Kandy
- Major cities: List: Matale; Nuwara Eliya
- Districts: List: Kandy; Matale; Nuwara Eliya

Government
  - Type: Provincial Council
  - Body: Central Provincial Council
  - Governor: Sarath Abeykoon

Area
  - Total: 5,674 km^{2} (2,191 sq mi)
  - Rank: 6th (8.63% of total area)

Population (2024 census)
  - Total: 2,714,045
  - Rank: 2nd (12.97% of total pop.)
  - Density: 478.3/km^{2} (1,239/sq mi)

Gross Regional Product (2021)
  - Total: Rs. 3,202.384 billion
  - Rank: 3rd (10.7% of total)
- Time zone: UTC+05:30 (Sri Lanka)
- ISO 3166 code: LK-2
- Vehicle registration: CP
- Official languages: Sinhalese; Tamil
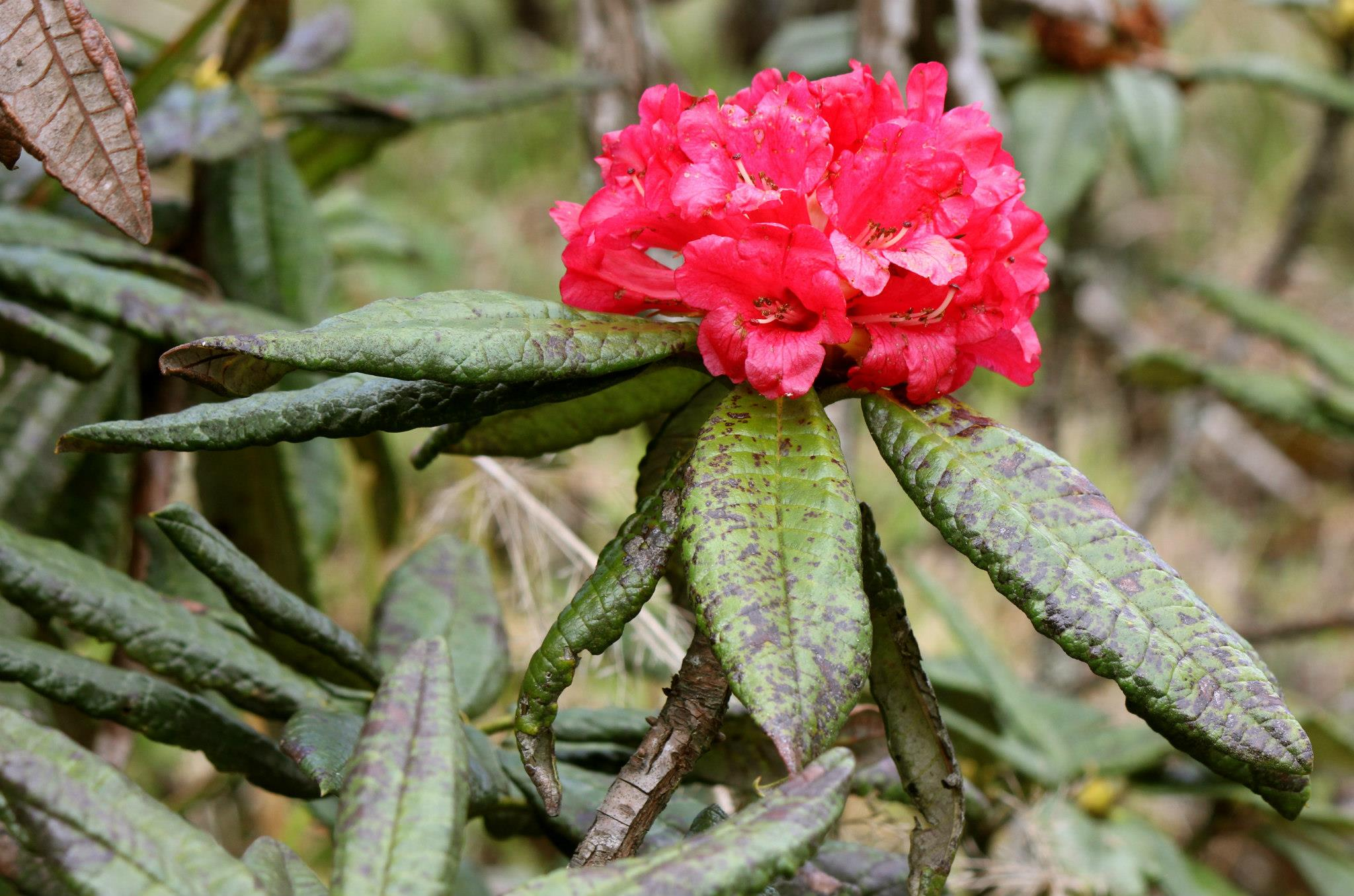
- Flower: Rhododendron arboreum
- Website: www.cp.gov.lk

The Central Province (Sinhala: මධ්‍යම පළාත Madhyama Paḷāta, Tamil: மத்திய மாகாணம் Maddiya Mākāṇam) is one of the nine provinces of Sri Lanka. The province has an area of 567,400 ha (1,402,000 acres) and a population of 2,421,148, making it the second most populated province. The city of Kandy has been its capital since 1469.

The Central Province is located primarily in the central mountainous terrain of Sri Lanka. It is bordered by the North Central Province to the north, the Uva Province to the east, the North Western Province to the west and the Sabaragamuwa Province to the south and west.

The province is famous for its production of Ceylon tea, the cultivation of which was initiated by the British in the 1860s after a devastating disease killed all coffee plantations in the province. The province attracts many tourists, with hill station towns such as Gampola, Hatton and Nuwara Eliya. The province is home to four UNESCO World Heritage Sites.

== History ==
Though three successive European powers invaded and established colonies on the island of Sri Lanka between the 16th and 19th centuries, the central province managed to maintain its independence until 1815, when the British conquered the Kingdom of Kandy. The British then established a colonial headman ranking system in 1824, which came into effect in 1832.

The provinces of Sri Lanka were established by the British in 1833. In independent Sri Lanka, provinces did not have any legal status or power until 1987, when the 13th Amendment to the Constitution of Sri Lanka established provincial councils.

Colonial head mudaliyars

- Sir Christofel de-Silva (1824–1842)
- Don William Gunawardene De-Saram III (1842–1856)
- Sir Hendrick Ekanayake (1856–1860)
- Sir Alexander-James Divakara Mohotti (1860–1888)
- Don Agaris Divakara Mohotti (1888–1924)

The Mudaliyar Office was abolished in 1924 and the last of the colonial headmen retired from their positions and gave up the rule to the British officers in 1926. All headman positions were then passed down to the newly elected governor-general of the Central Province. This was established in 1929 as a way for the British to directly rule the provinces.

The central province is home to many sites historical and cultural importance, such as the historic town of Matale, the Temple of the Tooth, the Dambulla cave temple, the Aluwihare temple and the Sigiriya rock fortress.

== Geography ==
The province has an area of 5,674 km^{2} and a population of 2,421,148. Major towns include Kandy, Matale, Dambulla, Gampola, Nuwara Eliya and Hatton.

=== Mountain ranges ===
The terrain of the Central Province is mostly mountainous, with deep valleys cutting into it. The Knuckles Mountain Range, Adam's Peak and Horton Plains are UNESCO World Heritage Sites located in the Central Highlands of Sri Lanka. The mountain of Pidurutalagala, an ultra-prominent peak and the tallest mountain in Sri Lanka at 2,524 m (8,281 ft), is also located in the Central Province.

=== Climate ===
The Central Province has a relatively cooler climate, and many areas above 1,500 metres often have chilly nights. The western slopes are very wet, some places have almost 7,000 mm of rain per year. The eastern slopes are parts of the mid-dry zone and receives rain only from the North-Eastern monsoon. Temperatures range from 24 °C in Kandy to 16 °C in Nuwara Eliya, which is 1,889 m above sea level.

== Administrative divisions ==
The Central Province is divided into three districts and 36 divisional secretariats.

=== Districts ===
Administrative Divisions of Central Province
District	Capital	Area (km^{2})	Population
Kandy District	Kandy	1,940	1,279,028
Matale District	Matale	1,993	441,328
Nuwara Eliya District	Nuwara Eliya	1,741	703,610

=== Divisional secretariats ===
The districts of the Sri Lanka are divided into administrative sub-units known as divisional secretariats. These were originally based on the feudal counties, the korales and ratas. They were formerly known as 'DRO Divisions' after the 'Divisional Revenue Officer'. Later the DROs became 'Assistant Government Agents' and the Divisions were known as 'AGA Divisions'. Currently, the divisions are administered by a 'Divisional Secretary' and are known as a 'DS Divisions'.

There are 36 divisional secretariats in Central Province. There are 20 in the Kandy District, 11 in the Matale District and 5 in the Nuwara Eliya District.

=== Major population centres ===
Largest cities or towns in Central Province, Sri Lanka As per the 2012 Census
Rank		District	Pop.
1	Kandy	Kandy	125,182
2	Matale	Matale	48,225
3	Gampola	Kandy	37,871
4	Nuwara Eliya	Nuwara Eliya	35,081
5	Dambulla	Matale	26,000
6	Hatton	Nuwara Eliya	14,585
7	Nawalapitiya	Kandy	13,338
8	Kadugannawa	Kandy	12,654
9	Wattegama	Kandy	8,157
10	Talawakele	Nuwara Eliya	4,691

== Demographics ==
The Central Province is an ethnically diverse province, with a mixture of Sinhalese, Tamil and Moor communities. Many tea plantation workers are Indian Tamils, brought over to Sri Lanka by the British in the 19th century.

=== Ethnicity ===
Ethnicity in Central Province (2024)
1. Sinhala (65.7%)
2. Hill Tamils (15.0%)
3. Sri Lankan Moors (10.7%)
4. Sri Lankan Tamils (8.30%)
5. Others (0.22%)

Ethnic group	Population	%
Sinhalese	1,584,100	65.35%
Indian Tamils	482,945	19.92%
Sri Lankan Moors	223,076	9.2%
Sri Lankan Tamils	122,438	5.05%
Burghers	3,589	0.15%
Others	7,818	0.32%
Total	2,423,966	100.00%

=== Religion ===
Religion in Central Province (2024)
1. Buddhism (64.9%)
2. Hinduism (20.9%)
3. Islam (11.0%)
4. Catholicism (2.14%)
5. Other Christianity (1.05%)
6. Others (0.01%)

As per the 2012 Sri Lankan census, there were 1,672,625 Buddhists, 540,339 Hindus, 263,874 Muslims, 94,402 Christians and 317 people following other faiths in the Central Province.

== See also ==
- List of settlements in Central Province (Sri Lanka)
- Provinces of Sri Lanka
- Districts of Sri Lanka
- Tea production in Sri Lanka

== Maps ==
- Searchable Map of Sri Lanka
