= List of locations in the world with an English name =

This is a list of place names originally used in England and then later applied to other places throughout the world via English settlers and explorers.

== Argentina ==
- Hurlingham
- Londres (Spanish for London)
- Ranelagh

== Australia ==
See English place names in Australia

== Bangladesh ==
- American Camp
- Char Alexander
- Cox's Bazar
- Green Road
- New Market
- St. Martin's Island
- Tiger leg Island

== Barbados ==
See English place names in Barbados

== Bolivia ==
- Manchester

== Bermuda ==
- Somerset
- Somerset Island

== Canada ==
See English place names in Canada

== Chile ==
- Punta Dúngeness
- Wellington Island

== Costa Rica ==
- Liverpool

== Hong Kong ==
- Kennedy Town
- Stanley
- Prince Edward
- Cape Collinson
- Fortress Hill
- Victoria Peak
- Aberdeen, Hong Kong

== India ==
- Dalhousie, Himachal Pradesh (after Earl (later Marquess) of Dalhousie, Governor-General of India (1848–1856))
- McLeod Ganj, Himachal Pradesh (after Sir Donald Friell McLeod, KCSI CB, Lieutenant Governor of the Punjab (1865–1870))
- Forsythganj, Himachal Pradesh (after TD Forsythe, Esq, Civil Service, Asst Commissioner Simla District (1850))
- Wellington, Tamil Nadu (after Arthur Wellesley, 1st Duke of Wellington)
- Forbesganj (after Alexander John Forbes British District Collector and Municipal Commissioner of East India Company)
- Canning, South 24 Parganas (after Lord Canning, Governor-General of India (1856–1858), and Governor-General & Viceroy (1858–1862))
- Lansdowne, Uttarakhand (after Lord Landsdowne, Viceroy and Governor-General of India (1888–1894)
- Lucknow, Uttar Pradesh (The anglicised term of Lakhnau in Hindi)

Places in Andaman & Nicobar Islands

- Port Blair (after Archibald Blair, Esq, Captain in the Maritime Establishment of the East India Company at Bombay)
- Ritchie's Archipelago (after John Ritchie, 18th-century British marine surveyor)
- Napier Bay Island Group (likely after Field Marshal Robert Cornelis Napier, C-in-C India (1870 – 1876))
- Henry Lawrence Island (after Brigadier-General Sir Henry Montgomery Lawrence KCB, Chief Commissioner Oudh)
- John Lawrence Island (after Sir John Laird Mair Lawrence, Viceroy and Governor-General of India (1864–1869)
- Wilson Island (after Sir Archdale Wilson, Commandant Bengal Artillery Meerut, lead the action in Delhi and Lucknow, 1857)
- Outram Island (after Lieutenant General Sir James Outram, capture of Lucknow, 1857)
- Peel Island (after Captain Sir William Peel, Victoria Cross, wounded in the Relief of Lucknow)
- James Island
- Kyd Island
- Smith Island
- Pocock Island
- Montgomery Island
- Patric Island
- Clyde Island
- Elizabeth Bay
- Campbell Bay
- Macpherson's Strait
- Mount Harriet National Park (after Harriet Tytler, wife of Capt Robert Tytler of the 38th Native Infantry (1857), Supdt of Cellular Jail (1862). To be renamed "Mount Manipur")
- Stewart Island
- Stewartgunj
- Anderson Island
- Bennett Island (after Capt Bennett, Marine)
- Colebrook Island

Places in cities

- Churchgate, in Mumbai
- Whitefield, in Bengaluru
- Hastings, in Kolkata

Renamed places

- Daltongunj, Jharkhand (renamed Medininagar, 2004)
- Ross Island (renamed Netaji Subhas Chandra Bose Island, Dec 2018)
- Neill Island (renamed Shaheed Dweep, Dec 2018)
- Havelock Island (renamed Swaraj Dweep, Dec 2018)

Renamed places in cities

- Connaught Place (renamed Rajiv Chowk 1995),

== Ireland ==
- Chichester Park
- Sydenham
- Windsor
- Woodstock
- Athlone

== Israel ==
- Airport City

== Jamaica ==
- Kingston
- Manchester
- Middlesex
- Surrey
- Cornwall

== Malaysia ==
- Butterworth, Penang
- Brickfields, Kuala Lumpur
- George Town, Penang
- Cameron Highlands, Pahang
- Port Dickson, Negeri Sembilan
- Slim River, Perak
- Victoria, Labuan
- Fraser's Hill, Pahang

== Montserrat ==
- Plymouth

== Pakistan ==
- Abbottabad
- Campbellpur
- Jacobabad
- Jamesabad
- Lawrencepur
- Warburton

== Serbia ==
- Little London

== South Africa ==
- Arlington
- Bedford
- Boston
- Bramley
- Derby
- Epsom Downs
- Everton
- Kensington
- Kenton-on-Sea
- Lindley, Free State
- Lindley, Gauteng
- Malmesbury
- Margate
- New Brighton
- Newcastle
- Pennington
- Richmond
- Sandhurst
- Somerset East
- Somerset West
- Sydenham
- Worcester
- York
- Wellington

== Sri Lanka ==
See Place names in Sri Lanka with an English name

- Alton
- Brampton
- Bray
- Devon Falls
- Harrow
- Hatton
- Hythe
- Kenilworth
- Marlborough
- Norton Bridge
- Norwood
- Preston

== Trinidad and Tobago ==
- Plymouth

== United Kingdom ==
See List of British place names and their meanings

== United States ==
See List of locations in the United States with an English name

== See also ==
- English toponymy
