= Dimbula =

- Village
- Map of Sri Lanka showing the location of Dimbula
- Coordinates: 6.9491584°N 80.6281905°E
- Country: Sri Lanka
- Province: Central Province
- District: Nuwara Eliya
- Established: 1880

Area
  - Land: 4.662 km^{2} (1.800 sq mi)
- Elevation: 1,289 m (4,229 ft)

Population (2024)
  - Total: 5,093
  - Density: 1,092/km^{2} (2,830/sq mi)
- Time zone: UTC+5:30 (Sri Lanka Standard Time)
- Postal code: 22080

Dimbula is a village located in the Central Province, Sri Lanka. It is about 130 km (81 mi) east of Colombo, 60 km (37 mi) south of Kandy and 35 km (22 mi) west of Nuwara Eliya.

== Etymology ==
Dimbula means 'land of figs' in Sinhalese and is thought to refer to the indigenous hairy fig (kotadimbula) found in the area.

== Transport ==
Dimbula is located at the junction of B317 (Nawalapitiya - Dimbula) Road and the A7 (Talawakelle) Road.

== Institutions ==
- Dimbula Lodge. On 26 January 1874 a group of local freemasons resolved to form a lodge at Dimbula. A warrant was obtained from the Grand Lodge of Ireland and Dimbula Lodge 298 was established, becoming the only masonic lodge in the country outside of Colombo. It was known as the 'moonlight lodge' as the monthly meetings were held on Saturdays closest to the full moon, so that the brethren could safely ride back through the jungle to their respective remote tea plantations. In 1895 lodge meetings were moved to Adam’s Peak Hotel in Hatton, with the lodge returning to Dimbula in 1908, with meetings held at Talawakelle, until 1986 when meetings moved to Maskeliya. In 1999 the lodge celebrated its 125th anniversary.

== Landmarks ==
- Devon Falls, a 97 m (318 ft) high waterfall, the 19th highest waterfall in the country, is located 650 m (2,130 ft) north of Dimbula.
- Dimbula War Memorial, a large granite Celtic cross, with the names of those individuals who served and died in World War 1. It was erected on 15 October 1922.

== See also ==
- List of towns in Central Province, Sri Lanka
- Dimbula Athletic & Cricket Club
- Dimboola
- Devon Falls
