= Halgolla Grama Niladhari Division =

Halgolla
- Grama Niladhari Division
- Interactive map of Halgolla
- Coordinates: 7.046594°N 80.580258°E
- Country: Sri Lanka
- Province: Central Province
- District: Nuwara Eliya District
- Divisional Secretariat: Kothmale Divisional Secretariat
- Electoral district: Nuwara Eliya Electoral District
- Polling division: Kothmale Polling Division

Area
  - Total: 2.99 km^{2} (1.15 sq mi)
- Elevation: 143 m (469 ft)

Population (2012)
  - Total: 1,202
  - Density: 402/km^{2} (1,040/sq mi)
- ISO 3166 code: LK-2303165

Halgolla

Halgolla Grama Niladhari Division (codename 461C) is a Grama Niladhari division of the Kothmale Divisional Secretariat in the Nuwara Eliya District of Central Province, Sri Lanka.

Harangala and Kaludemada are located within, nearby or associated with Halgolla.

Halgolla is surrounded by the Kaludemada, Harangala South, Hunugaloya, Thelissagala, Ketabulawa, Werella Pathana, Ruwanpura and Harangala Grama Niladhari divisions.

== Demographics ==
=== Ethnicity ===
The Halgolla Grama Niladhari Division has a Sinhalese majority (92.8%). In comparison, the Kothmale Divisional Secretariat (which contains the Halgolla Grama Niladhari Division) has a Sinhalese majority (52.6%) and a significant Indian Tamil population (36.4%)

Ethnicity in Halgolla
1. Sinhalese (92.8%)
2. Moor (4.10%)
3. Sri Lankan Tamil (2.80%)
4. Other (0.20%)

=== Religion ===
The Halgolla Grama Niladhari Division has a Buddhist majority (92.8%). In comparison, the Kothmale Divisional Secretariat (which contains the Halgolla Grama Niladhari Division) has a Buddhist majority (52.3%) and a significant Hindu population (36.5%)

Religion in Halgolla
1. Buddhist (92.8%)
2. Muslim (4.10%)
3. Hindu (2.80%)
4. Other (0.20%)
