= Pusulpitiya Raja Maha Vihara =

Pusulpitiya Raja Maha Vihara (English: Pusulpitiya Great Royal Temple)
- පුසුල්පිටිය රජ මහා විහාරය
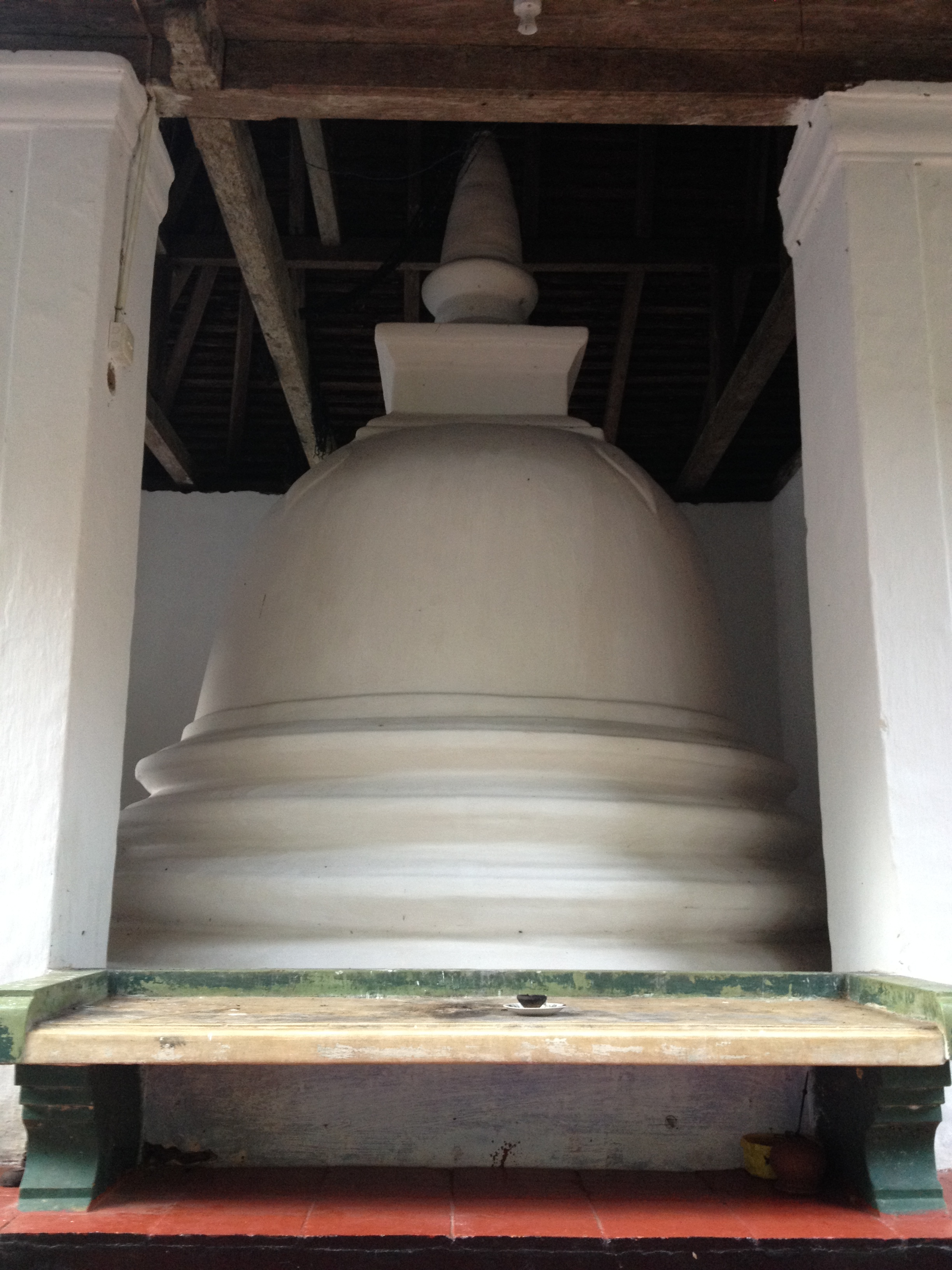
- The Stupa at Pusulpitiya Raja Maha Vihara

Religion
- Affiliation: Buddhism
- District: Nuwara Eliya
- Province: Central Province

Location
- Location: Pusulpitiya, Sri Lanka
- Interactive map of Pusulpitiya Raja Maha Vihara (English: Pusulpitiya Great Royal Temple)
- Coordinates: 7.0554°N 80.6482°E

Architecture
- Type: Buddhist Temple
- Archaeological Protected Monument of Sri Lanka

Pusulpitiya Raja Maha Vihara (Sinhala: පුසුල්පිටිය රජ මහා විහාරය, English: Pusulpitiya Great Royal Temple) is an ancient Buddhist temple which is located in Pusulpitiya village, Nuwara Eliya District, Sri Lanka. It is situated in Kotmale about 3 miles from Morape on the banks of the Kotmale Oya. Currently this temple has been recognized as an archaeological protected site in Sri Lanka. As part of the name of several temples, Raja Maha Vihara means in English: Great Royal Temple or Great Royal Monastery. It designates ancient Sri Lankan Buddhist temples that historically received royal patronage and donations from the king.

This temple is believed to be where Prince Dutugemunu spent his childhood when Elara was ruling Anuradhapura. Pusulpitiya Vihara is also said to have one of the four valuable Dambaran Buddha statues which has been brought to Sri Lanka from India by Arahat Maliyadeva.

== History ==
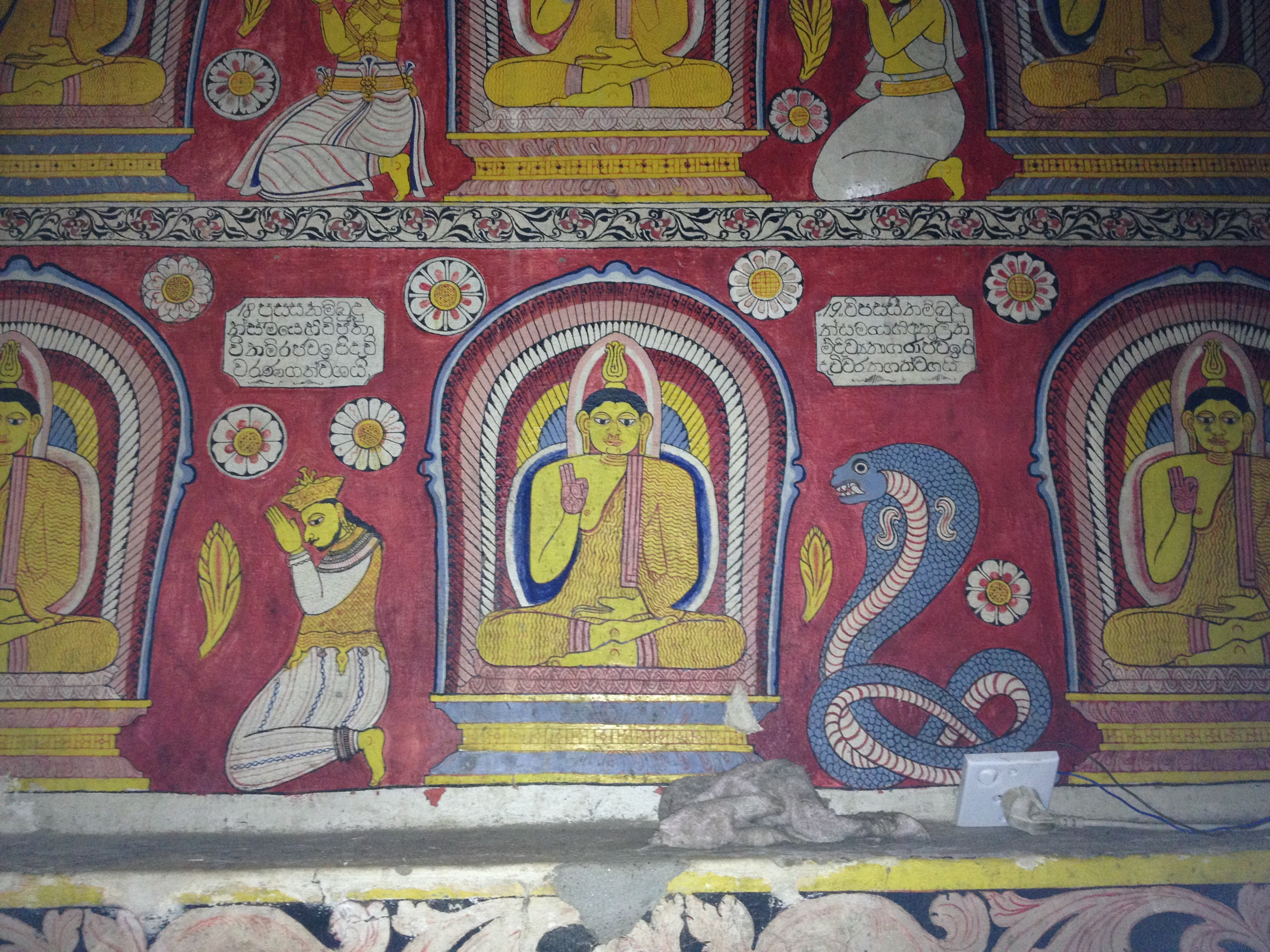
Paintings at new image house

The history of this temple is dated back to the 3rd century or before. The bo tree at the temple has been planted in the period of King Devanampiya tissa.

=== Legends ===
According to the legend, an Indian Brahmin who has come to Sri Lanka after heard about a golden ash pumpkin in Nain Kelina Thota in Kotmale area. To obtain that golden ash pumpkin he married a village girl from that area and gave a birth to a son. When the suitable time is reached, he scarified his son and obtained the pumpkin. While running with it, he kept the pumpkin on a rocky plain to get little rest. It is said that the golden ash pumpkin was dipped into the rock. Due to this incident, the area was known as Pusulpitiya and it is believed that the Pusulpitiya Rajamaha Vihara was constructed on the ground where the Golden ash pumpkin was dipped into the rock.

=== Tooth Relic of the Buddha ===
According to the chronicles Pusulpitiya Rajamaha Vihara has given refuge for Sacred Tooth Relic of Buddha for three times during the times of political unrest.
