= St. Clair's Falls =

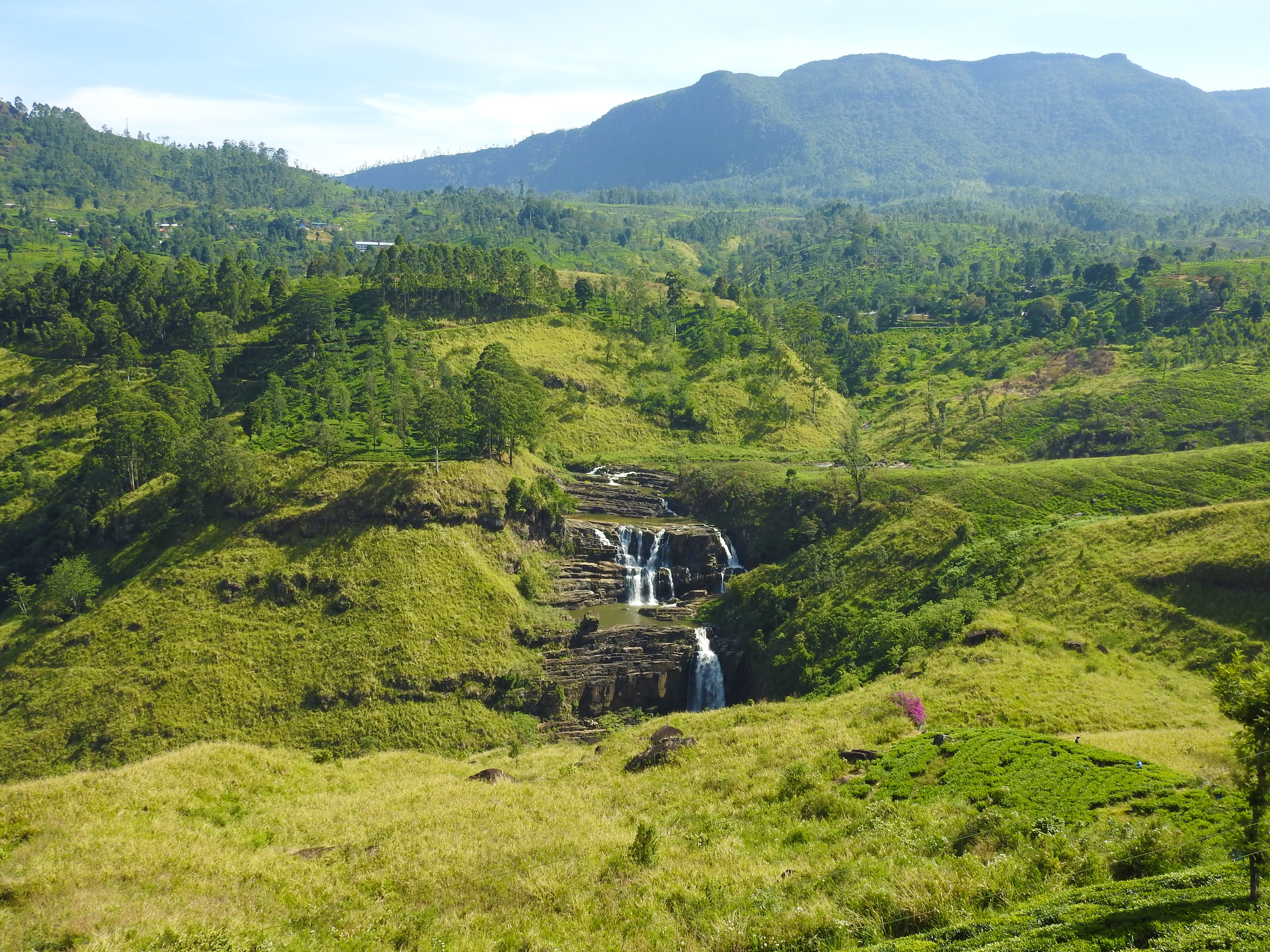
- Interactive map of St. Clair's Falls
- Location: Talawakele, Sri Lanka
- Coordinates: 6°57′04″N 80°38′52″E
- Type: Cascade
- Total height: 80 m (260 ft)
- Number of drops: 2
- Total width: 50 m (160 ft)
- Watercourse: Kotmale Oya

St. Clair's Falls (Sinhala: සාන්ත ක්ලෙයාර් ඇල්ල) is one of the widest waterfalls in Sri Lanka and is commonly known as the "Little Niagara of Sri Lanka". It is one of six waterfalls affected by the Upper Kotmale Hydropower Project.

The falls are situated 3 kilometres (1.9 mi) west of the town of Talawakele on the Hatton-Talawakele Highway in Nuwara Eliya District.

The falls are located along the Kotmale Oya, a tributary of the Mahaweli River, as it cascades over three rock outcrops into a large pool, running through a tea estate, after which the falls are named. The waterfalls consist of two falls called "Maha Ella" (Sinhalese "The Greater Fall"), which is 80 metres (260 ft) high and 50 metres (160 ft) wide and "Kuda Ella", (Sinhalese "The Lesser Fall"), which is 50 metres (160 ft) high and located immediately downstream of the main fall. St Clair's falls are the 20th highest waterfall in Sri Lanka.

== Environmentalists' concerns ==
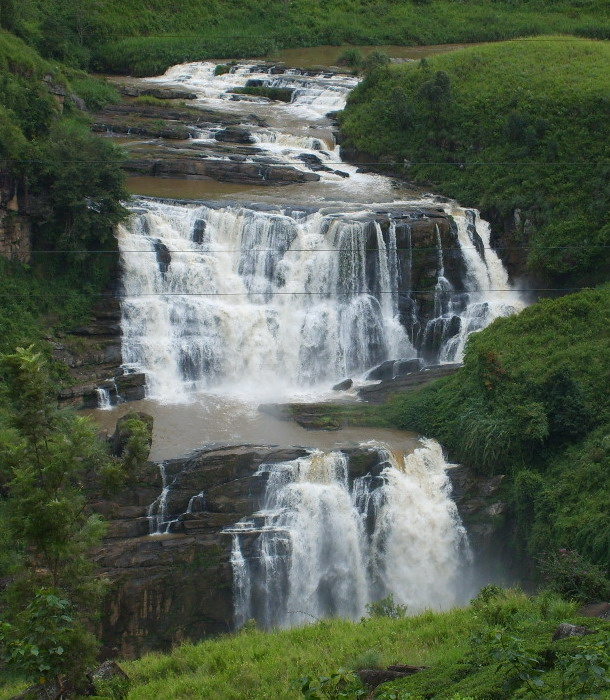
The volume of water pre-construction of the dam (2008)

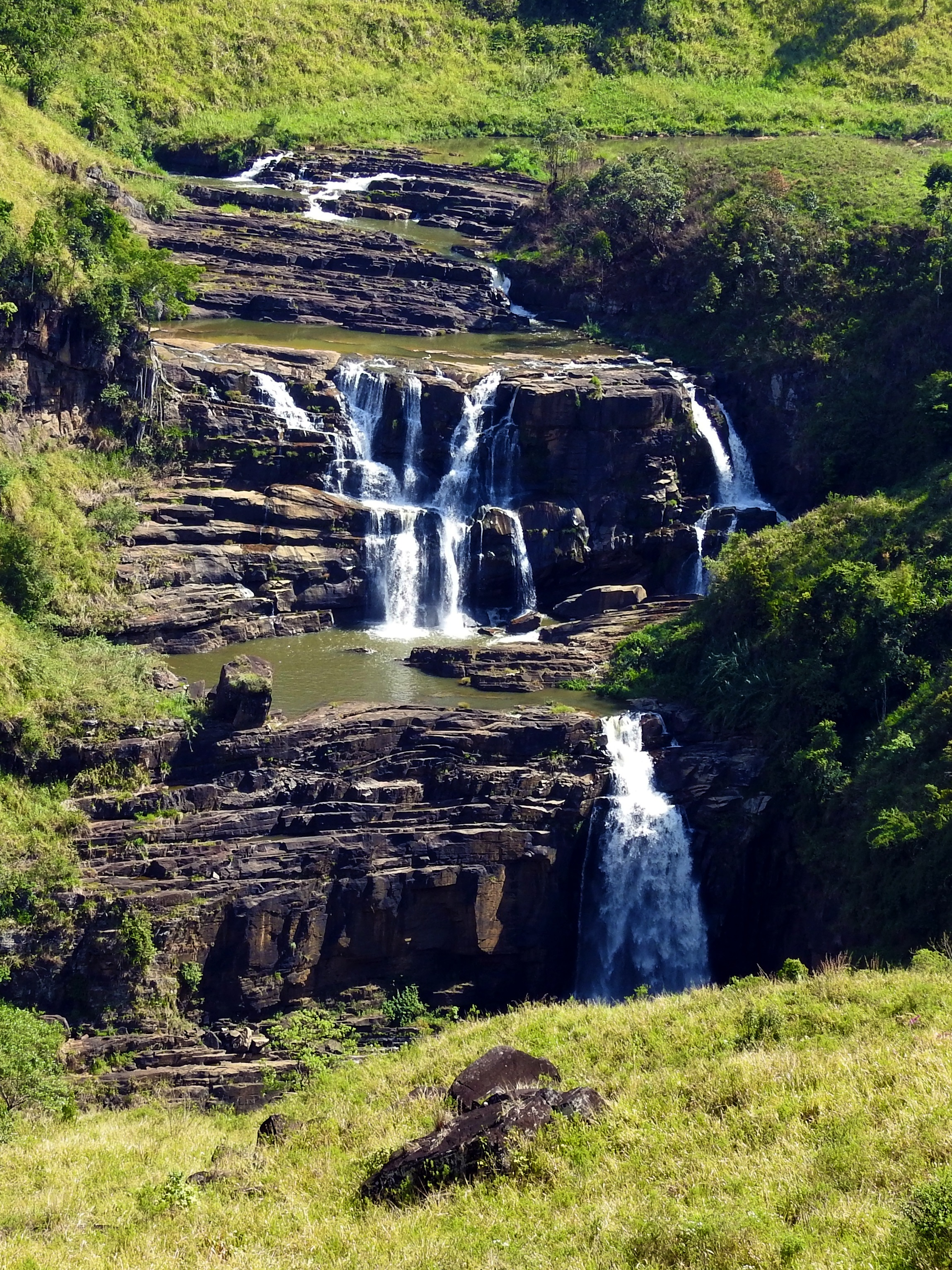
A significant drop in volume can be observed after the construction of the dam (2018)

From the inception of the Upper Kotmale Project, the environmentalists protested concerning that the waterfall is threatened by the Upper Kotmale Dam. The falls are located 2.2 km (1.4 mi) downstream from the dam. The Government however has stated that they will release a limited quantity of water to ensure a continuous flow of 47,250 cubic metres (1,669,000 cu ft) water over the falls for 10 hours and 30 minutes daily, between sunrise and sunset.

== See also ==
- List of waterfalls
- List of waterfalls of Sri Lanka
