= Nanu Oya =

Coordinates: 06°56′39″N 80°44′44″E

Location
- Country: Sri Lanka
- Province: Central Province

Physical characteristics
- Source: Pidurutalagala
  - location: Central Province
  - coordinates
  - elevation: 2,000 m (6,600 ft)
- Mouth: Kotmale Oya
  - elevation: 1,200 m (3,937 ft)
- Length: 27 km (17 mi)

Basin features
- Waterbodies: Lake Gregory

Nanu Oya is a 27 km (17 mi) long stream in the Central Province of Sri Lanka. It originates at an elevation of over 2,000 m (6,562 ft) on Pidurutalagala, the highest mountain in Sri Lanka, flowing into the Kotmale Oya at an elevation of approximately 1,200 m (3,937 ft). The Kotmale Oya is a tributary of the Mahaweli River, the longest river in Sri Lanka, which finally discharges at Trincomalee after a combined distance of nearly 350 km (217 mi). The river was dammed in 1873 to create the popular Lake Gregory in Nuwara Eliya. The Nanu Oya discharges into the Kotmale Oya 2.5 km (1.6 mi) upstream of the Upper Kotmale Dam.

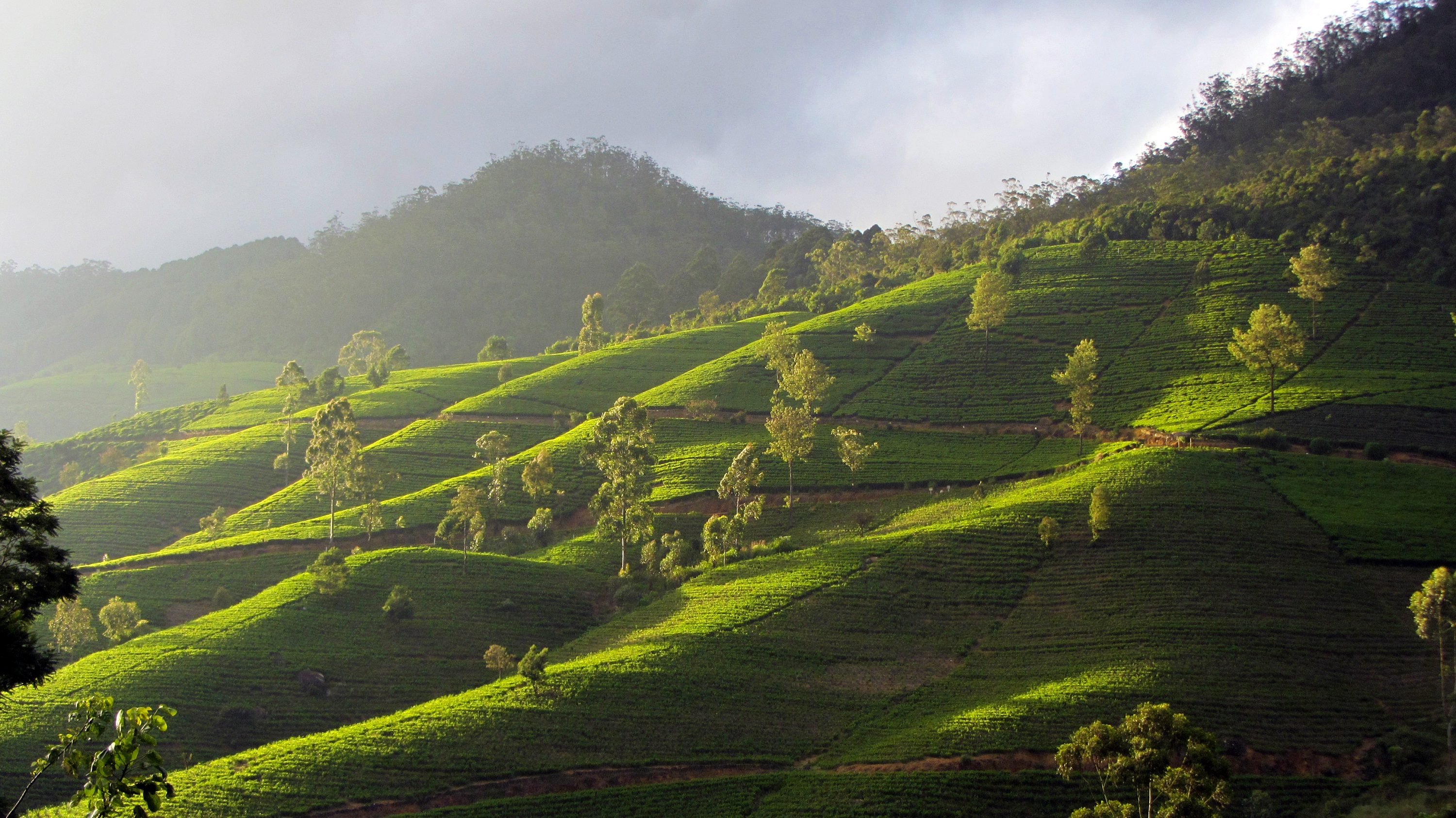
Hills at the banks of Nanu Oya.

== See also ==
- Nanu Oya (town)
- List of dams and reservoirs in Sri Lanka
- List of rivers of Sri Lanka
