= Pallegama =

- Village
- Location within Sri Lanka
- Coordinates: 7°9′50″N 80°43′32″E
- Country: Sri Lanka
- Province: Central Province
- Elevation: 2,000 ft (610 m)
- Time zone: UTC+5:30 (Sri Lanka Standard Time)

Pallegama is a village in Sri Lanka. It is located within Central Province. The Kotmale Oya drains into the Mahaweli River at this location.

== See also ==
- List of towns in Central Province, Sri Lanka
