= Kadadora Vihara =

Buddhist temple in Sri Lanka

- කඩදොර විහාරය
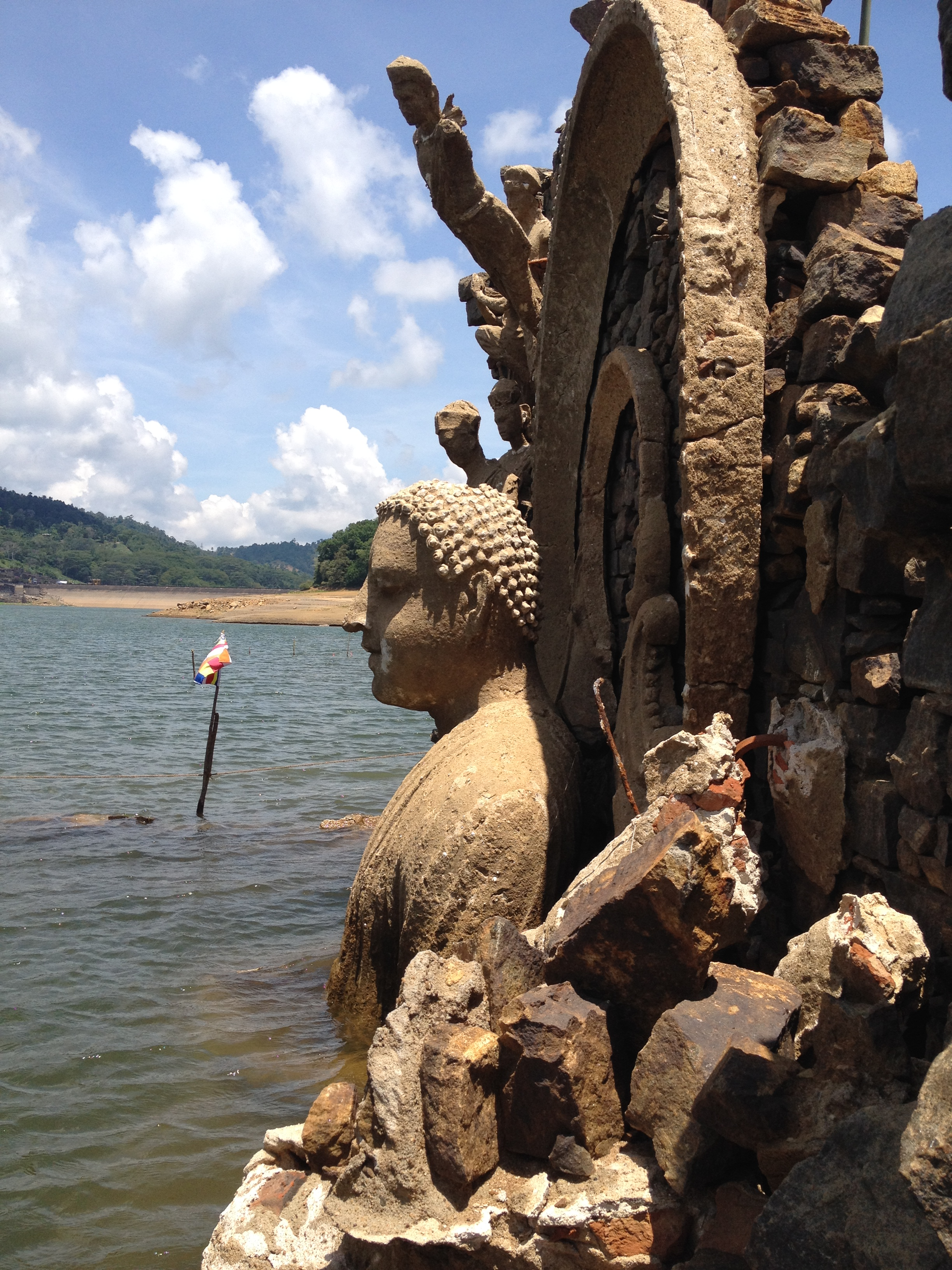
- Sculptured statues of the Buddha and other deities. (The dam of Kotmale reservoir can be seen left side)

Religion
- Affiliation: Buddhism
- District: Nuwara Eliya
- Province: Central Province
- Status: Abandoned

Location
- Location: Kadadora, Sri Lanka
- Interactive map of Kadadora Vihara
- Coordinates: 07°03′39″N 80°35′50″E

Architecture
- Type: Buddhist Temple

Kadadora Vihara (Also known as Kadadora Sri Priyabimbaramaya Vihara) was a Buddhist temple, situated in Kadadora, Nuwara Eliya District, Sri Lanka. The temple was abandoned and ruined as the construction of Kotmale Dam in 1979 by Mahaweli Development programme. The temple was designed with a central sanctuary known as the 'Garbhagriha,' which contained the primary Buddha statue. Surrounding this main chamber were smaller rooms and open spaces intended for both community gatherings and religious ceremonies. The walls of the central shrine featured paintings and frescoes illustrating significant events from the life of Buddha and scenes from the Jataka stories. The ruins of Vihara still can be seen when the water level of Kotmale Reservoir is low, but the sight is very rare.

It is said that about 57 villages and 54 religious places in Kotmale were submerged with the completion of the reservoir in 1985. Except Kadadora Vihara other shrines including Thispane Vihara, Morape Devalaya, Othalawa Vihara, Pattini Devalaya and Medagoda Vihara were said to have gone under water when the reservoir was built. However, many of these temple ruins no longer exist.

In order to compensate the loss of these religious shrines those were submerged in the reservoir, the Mahaweli authorities started the construction of bubble shaped Stupa, Mahaweli Maha Seya which only second to the great Ruwanwelisaya of Anuradhapura in height.
