= Lovers Leap Falls =

Scenic waterfall near Nuwara Eliya

Lover’s Leap Falls
- පෙම්වතුන්ගේ දියඇල්ල, ලවර්ස් ලීප් ඇල්ල
- Interactive map of Lover’s Leap Falls
- Location: Nuwara Eliya, Central Province, Sri Lanka
- Coordinates: 6.966667°N 80.783333°E
- Type: Cascade
- Total height: 30 m (98 ft)
- Watercourse: Stream from Pidurutalagala

Lover’s Leap Falls (also spelled Lovers’ Leap Falls) (Sinhala: පෙම්වතුන්ගේ දියඇල්ල, ලවර්ස් ලීප් ඇල්ල) is a waterfall located near Nuwara Eliya, in the Central Province of Sri Lanka. The fall is about 30 metres (98 feet) in height and lies close to the Pedro Tea Estate, approximately 5 kilometres (3 miles) from the town centre.

== Geography and hydrology ==
The waterfall is fed by streams originating from the slopes of Pidurutalagala, the tallest mountain in Sri Lanka. The cascade drops over granite ledges into a pool at the base, and water from the falls contributes to the supply for Nuwara Eliya town. The approach to the falls passes through tea plantations and offers panoramic views of the surrounding hill country.

== Legend and name ==
The name “Lover’s Leap” is derived from a local legend. According to tradition, a prince from the region fell in love with a village girl, but their relationship was forbidden by his family. In despair, the couple leapt to their deaths from the top of the waterfall. Variations of the tale exist, with some accounts describing the prince becoming lost while hunting before meeting the young woman.

== Tourism and access ==
Lover’s Leap Falls is a well-known attraction for both local and international visitors. It can be reached on foot through the Pedro Tea Estate, and trekking paths lead to viewing points near the base and summit of the falls and also through the Lake Gregory.
