= Talawakelle =

Talawakelle තලවාකැලේ தலவாக்கலை
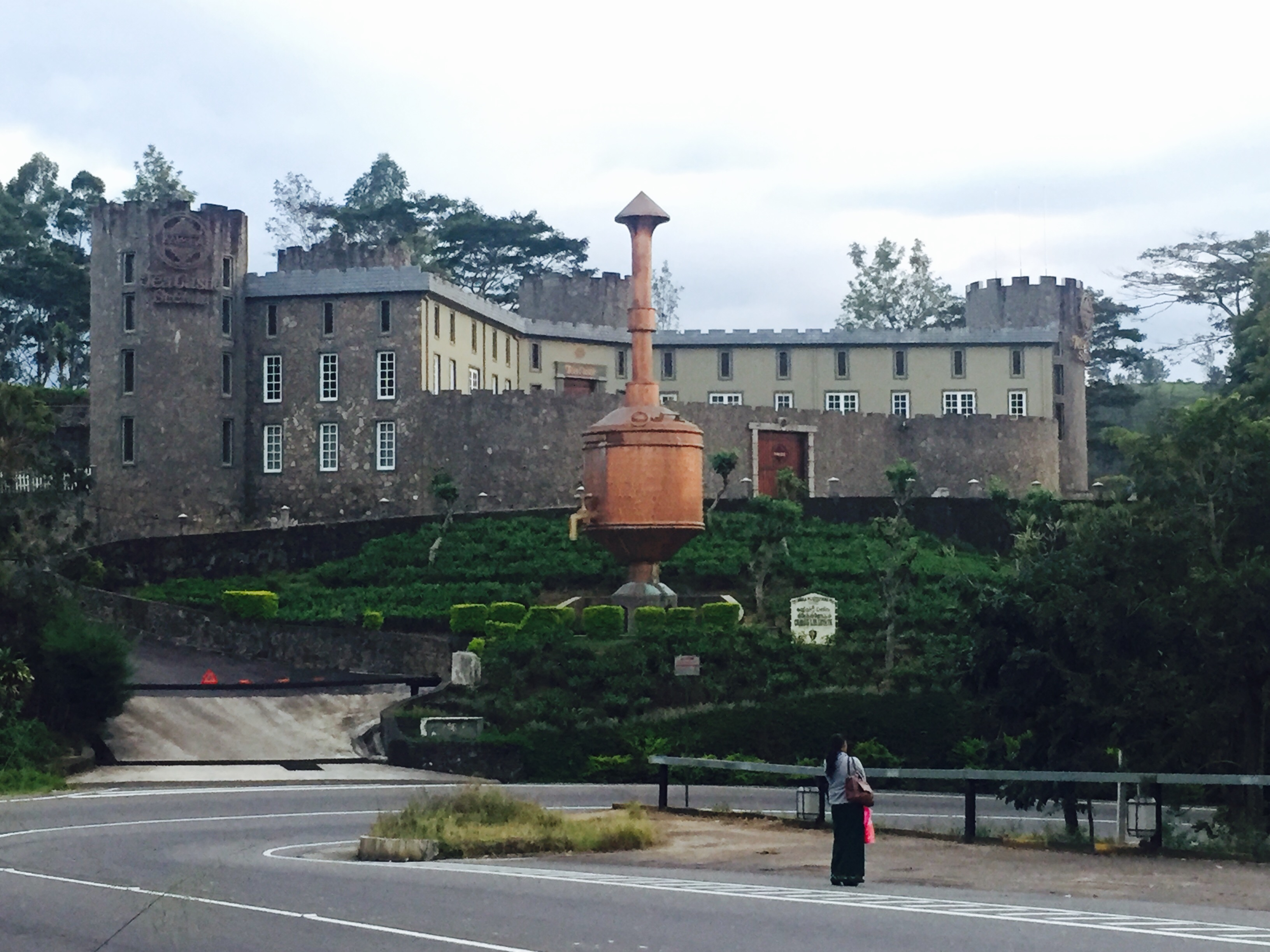
- Mlesna tea castle, Talawakelle

- Location within Sri Lanka
- Coordinates: 6°56′00″N 80°39′00″E
- Country: Sri Lanka
- Province: Central Province
- Time zone: UTC+5:30 (Sri Lanka Standard Time Zone)
  - Summer (DST): UTC+5:30 (Summer time)

Talawakelle (Sinhala: තලවාකැලේ, Tamil: தலவாக்கலை) is a town in Nuwara Eliya District in the Central Province, Sri Lanka, governed by an Urban Council. It is the centre of the Dimbula tea planting district, the largest tea growing area in Sri Lanka. It is situated on A7 Colombo-Nuwara Eliya highway. The altitude of Talawakelle is 1,198 metres (3,930 ft). Talawakelle railway station is one of the major stops of Udarata (Sinhala "Hill Country") or Main railway line. The town is administered by Talawakelle-Lindula urban council.

Located in the Colombo-Badulla railway line, and Avissawella - Nuware Eliya main Road (A7) the town serves as a gateway to Tea Research Institute of Sri Lanka, Nuwara Eliya and tourists.

== Climate ==
The mean annual temperature is around 18°C in the area and this climate is described as the perfect "tea-climate".

== Demography ==
Majority of the population of Talawakelle is Indian Tamils who are workers of neighboring tea estates. The town considered the focal point of Indian Tamil politics in Sri Lanka. Small portion of Sinhalese also live in the town.

== Education ==
Schools in Talawakelle are part of the Nuwara-Eliya school district.

- Talawakelle Tamil Maha Vidyalayam - Tamil Medium
- Sumana Secondary School is a provincial school for grades 6 through 13. It has an Advanced Science track. Instruction is provided in both Sinhala and English.
- St. Patrick's College, Talawakelle - Tamil Medium

The Diocese of Kandy invited the Comboni Missionary Sisters to establish a missionary presence in Talawakelle in 2012 to support the education of the local Tamil people.

== Visitor attractions ==
There are two waterfalls situated around Talawakelle area. Both the waterfalls formed by Kothmale Oya, which runs through the town.

- Devon Falls
- St. Clair's Falls

== Post and telephone ==
- Sri Lanka 00 94
- Area code 052
- Postal code 22100

== Upper Kothmale Project ==
The last major hydro-electricity project in Sri Lanka, Upper Kotmale Dam, is currently underway near the town of Talawakelle. The project drew many a protests from environmentalists and local residents. Owing to threatened existence of St. Clair's Falls and fear of losing or submerging their homes to the dam.

== Notes ==
=== References ===
- W.Cave, Henry (2003). Ceylon along the Rail Track (2nd Visidunu ed.). Visidunu Publishers. ISBN 955-9170-46-5.
