= Kotmale =

Coordinates: 7°01′N 80°35′E

Kotmale කොත්මලේ கொத்மலை
- Village
- Interactive map of Kotmale
- Country: Sri Lanka
- Province: Central Province
- District: Nuwara Eliya District

Area
  - Total: 225 km^{2} (87 sq mi)

Population
  - Total: 107,523
  - Density: 478/km^{2} (1,240/sq mi)
- Time zone: UTC+5:30 (Sri Lanka Standard Time)

Kotmale (Sinhala: කොත්මලේ, romanized: Kotmalē; Tamil: கொத்மலை, romanized: Kotmalai) is a village in Sri Lanka in Central Province. Kotmale forms part of a mountainous region that the Sinhalese kings left forested to generate sufficient rainfall for rice cultivation in the valleys below.

The Sinhalese prince Dutugamunu is said to have taken refuge in Kotmale to escape the wrath of his father, King Kavantissa. Kotmale is also where the Kandyan Kings hid the sacred tooth relic during periods of political instability, the last occasion being during the British occupation in 1815.

== Attractions ==
- Kotmale Dam, a 87 m (285 ft) high hydroelectric and irrigation dam. Construction of the dam commenced in 1977 and was completed in 1995.
- Kotmale Mahaweli Maha Seya, a 84 m (276 ft) high stupa, with a 61 m (200 ft) diameter, overlooking the Kotmale Dam. It is the largest stupa constructed in the country in over 1,300 years. It serves as a reminder of the eighteen shrines/temples that were submerged with the construction of the Kotmale reservoir. It cost approximately Rs. 300 million to build.
- Kotmale Hanging Bridge, a wooden suspension bridge. The bridge spans 100 m (330 ft) over the Mahaweli River.

== See also ==
- Upper Kotmale Dam
- List of towns in Central Province, Sri Lanka
