= Upper Kotmale Dam =

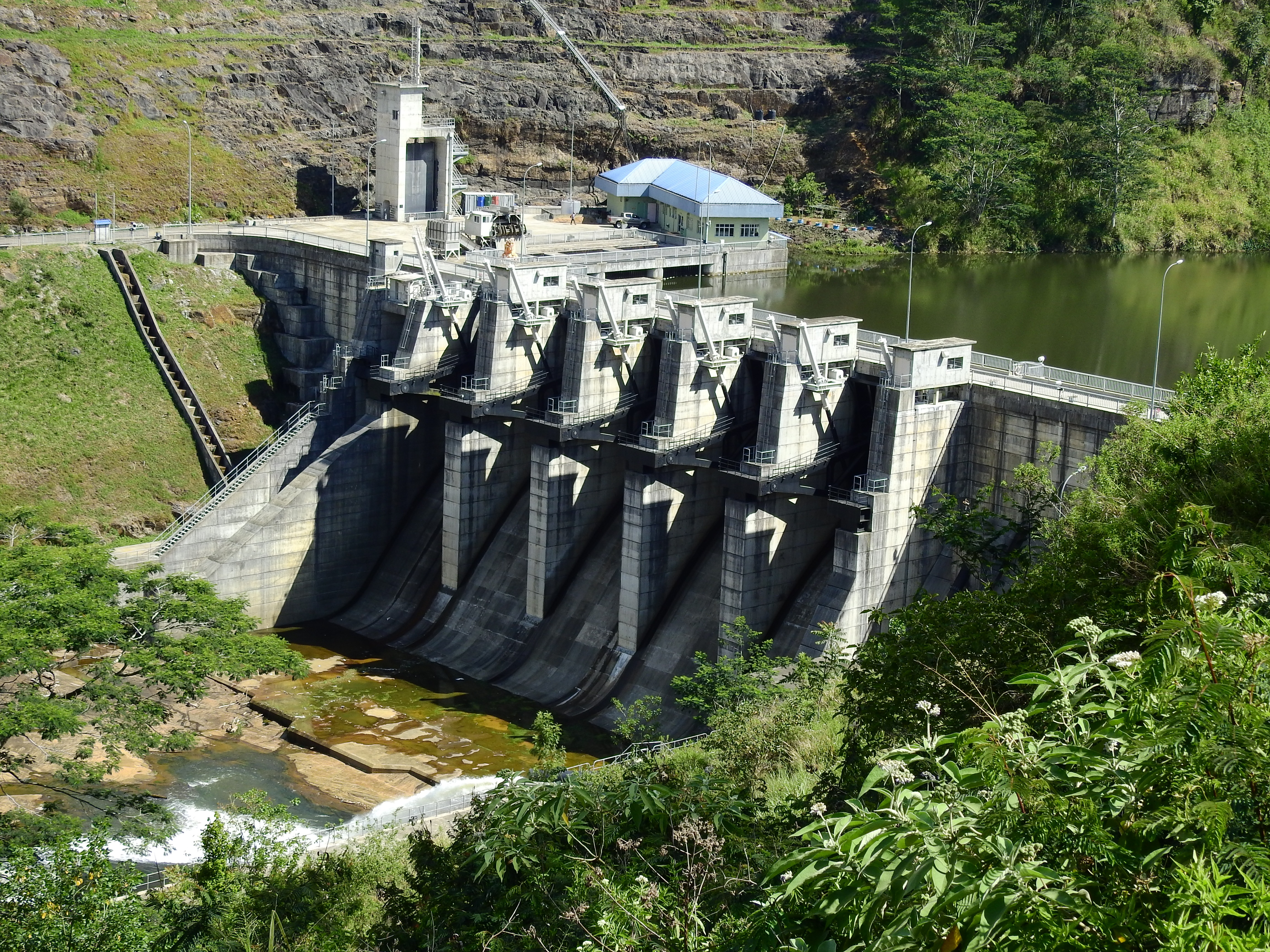
- The dam in March 2018.

- Location within Sri Lanka
- Official name: Upper Kotmale Dam
- Country: Sri Lanka
- Location: Talawakele, Nuwara Eliya
- Coordinates: 06°56′48″N 80°39′29″E
- Purpose: Power Generation
- Status: Operational
- Construction began: 2003
- Opening date: 2012
- Construction cost: Rs. 44 billion
- Owner: Ceylon Electricity Board

Dam and spillways
- Type of dam: Gravity dam
- Impounds: Kotmale River
- Height (foundation): 35 m (115 ft)
- Length: 180 m (591 ft)
- Width (crest): 7 m (23 ft)
- Spillways: 5
- Spillway capacity: 3,300 m^{3}/s (116,538.4 cu ft/s)

Reservoir
- Creates: Upper Kotmale Reservoir
- Total capacity: 800,000 m^{3} (28,000,000 ft^{3})
- Surface area: 250,000 m^{2} (2,690,978 ft^{2})

Upper Kotmale Power Station
- Coordinates: 07°02′32″N 07°12′00″E
- Commission date: 14 July 2012
- Type: Run-of-the-river
- Turbines: 2 × 75 MW Francis-type
- Installed capacity: 150 MW
- Annual generation: 409 GWh
- Website https://ceb.lk/

The Upper Kotmale Dam (also known as the Upper Kotmale Hydropower Project, or UKHP) is located in Talawakele, within the Nuwara Eliya District, in the Central Province of Sri Lanka. The dam feeds the third largest hydroelectric power station in the country.

== History ==
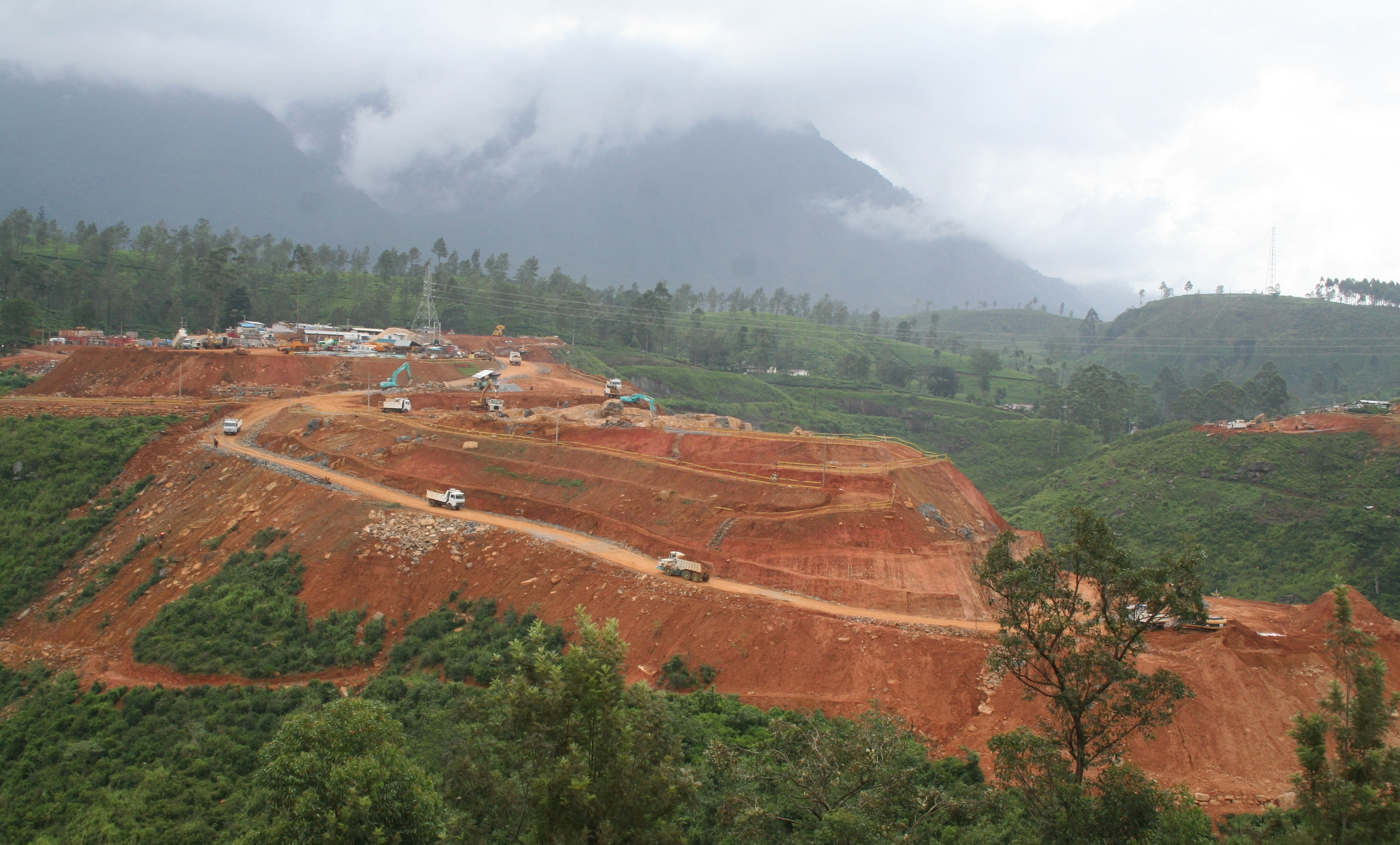
The dam under construction in 2007

The project was initially planned in 1968 by the local authorities, before the Government of Japan funded a study between 1985 and 1987 to further examine the hydroelectric potential in the upper reaches of Kotmale River. The feasibility study included five sites and eight alternative development schemes, and concluded with two sites which were technically and economically more feasible.

The two sites were a conventional type at Caledonia, and a run-of-the-river type at Talawakele. The project at Caledonia involved the displacement of over 2,700 families and inundation of large areas of land used for tea plantations, and thus the Caledonia site was dropped. Further funding was then provided by Japan for the engineering study, which included a review of the feasibility study, selection of an optimal development plan, development of the detailed design, and the preparation of tender documents and an environmental impact assessment report.

The environmental impact assessment report was completed in September 1994, with the final design report completed in March 1995. The environmental assessment identified key issues associated with the project, which includes impact on St. Clair's Falls aesthetics due to stream flow reductions, social impacts due to resettlement of affected people, possible effects on ground water due to tunnelling, impacts on downstream water uses due to de-watering of streams, and impacts on biodiversity. These impacts led large delays in project development.

As per the National Environmental Act of 1998, the environmental clearance was then granted to the project. The project initially faced several objections, before being officially permitted by courts of law. Construction work on the project then began in 2006, and is expected to be completed by the end of 2011.

== Construction and development ==
This project is estimated to cost a total of up to Rs.44 billion, of which Rs.5.931 billion was funded by the Ceylon Electricity Board, and ¥33.265 billion by the Japan Bank for International Cooperation. The entire project covers an area of approximately 540 km^{2} (208 mi^{2}), and is developed in five phases:

- Phase 1: Site preparations, construction of employers and workers living quarters, construction of access roads, and relocation of affected people.
- Phase 2: All key civil engineering works, such as construction of tunnel, dam, underground power house etc. This takes about 50% of the project cost.
- Phase 3: Hydro-mechanical works such as construction of spillways, penstocks, intake gates, etc.
- Phase 4: Electro-mechanical works such as generation installations, construction of the switchyard, fire fighting system, communication system, etc.
- Phase 5: Construction of the 15.5 km (10 mi) 220-kV double-circuit power transmission line.

A total of 2,250 construction workers are employed at the site, of which 2,100 are locals, and 150 are foreign.

== Dam and reservoir ==
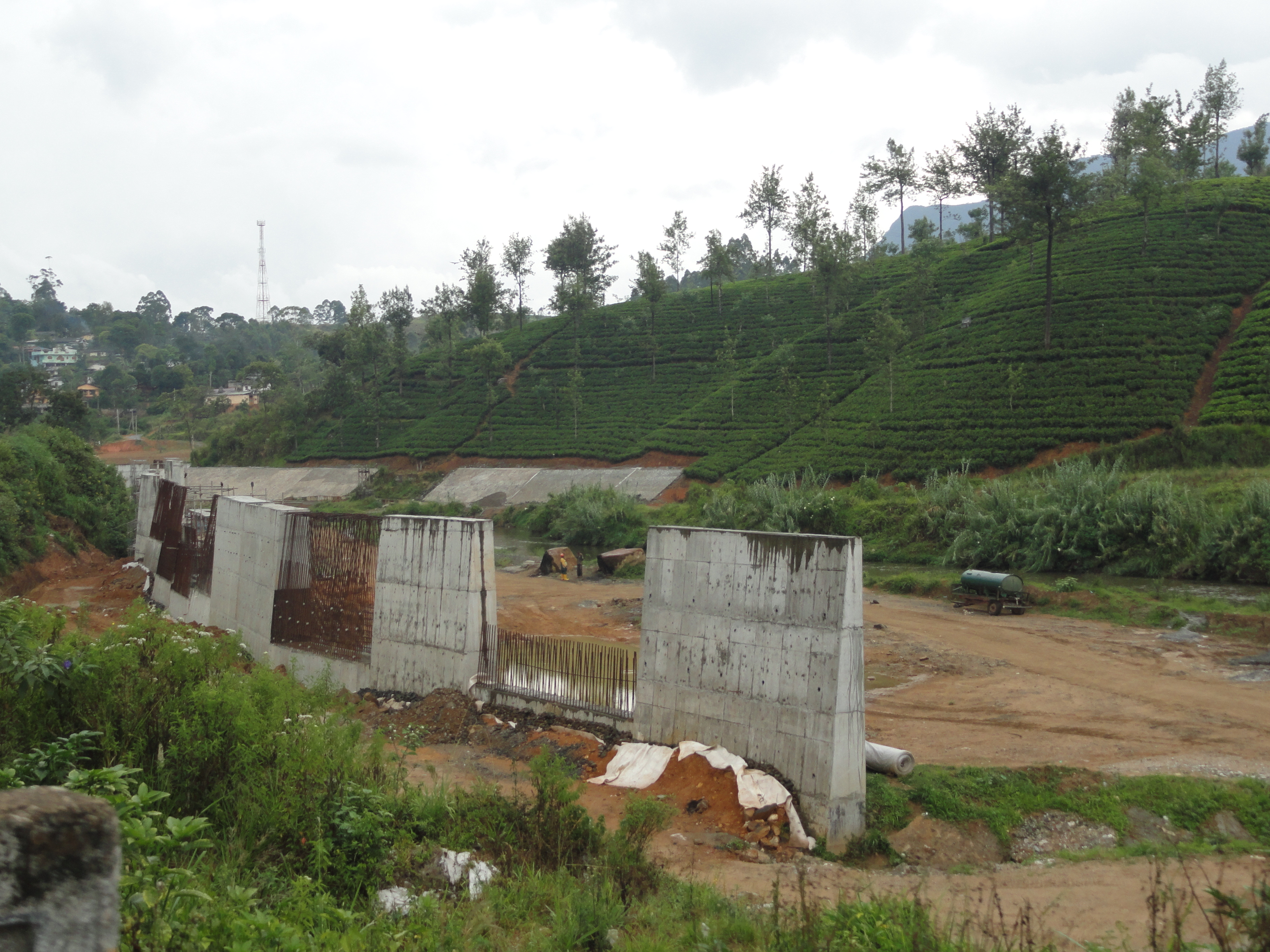
Preparations upstream for the creation of the Upper Kotmale Reservoir

The gravity dam measures 35.5 m (116.5 ft) tall, and 180 m (591 ft) wide, impounding the Kotmale River and creating the Upper Kotmale Reservoir. Once filled, the reservoir will have a surface area of 250,000 m^{2} (2,700,000 ft^{2}) with an average storage capacity of 800,000 m^{3} (28,000,000 ft^{3}). The minimum and maximum operating water levels are 1,190 m (3,904 ft) and 1,194 m (3,917 ft) AMSL respectively, while the tailwater level is 703 m (2,306 ft) AMSL. Water from the reservoir will be used for both irrigation development and hydroelectric power generation.

== Tunnel ==
During the construction work of Headrace tunnel

The 4.5–5.2 m (14.8–17.1 ft) diameter, 12.89 km (8.0 mi) long Upper Kotmale Tunnel, the longest excavated tunnel in Sri Lanka, will be used to deliver the water to the powerhouse. The tunnel begins at the dam site, and stretches north at a distance of approximately 7.4 km (4.6 mi) towards Pundaluoya, before stretching a further 5.5 km (3.4 mi) north-west towards Kumbaloluwa and ending up at its powerhouse at the Kotmale River near Niyamgamdora, at approximately 07°02′33″N 80°39′23″E, 2 km (1.2 mi) downstream of the confluence of Pundal River and the Kotmale River. Excavation on the tunnel was completed and ceremonially opened by President Mahinda Rajapaksa on 4 November 2010.

== Powerhouse ==
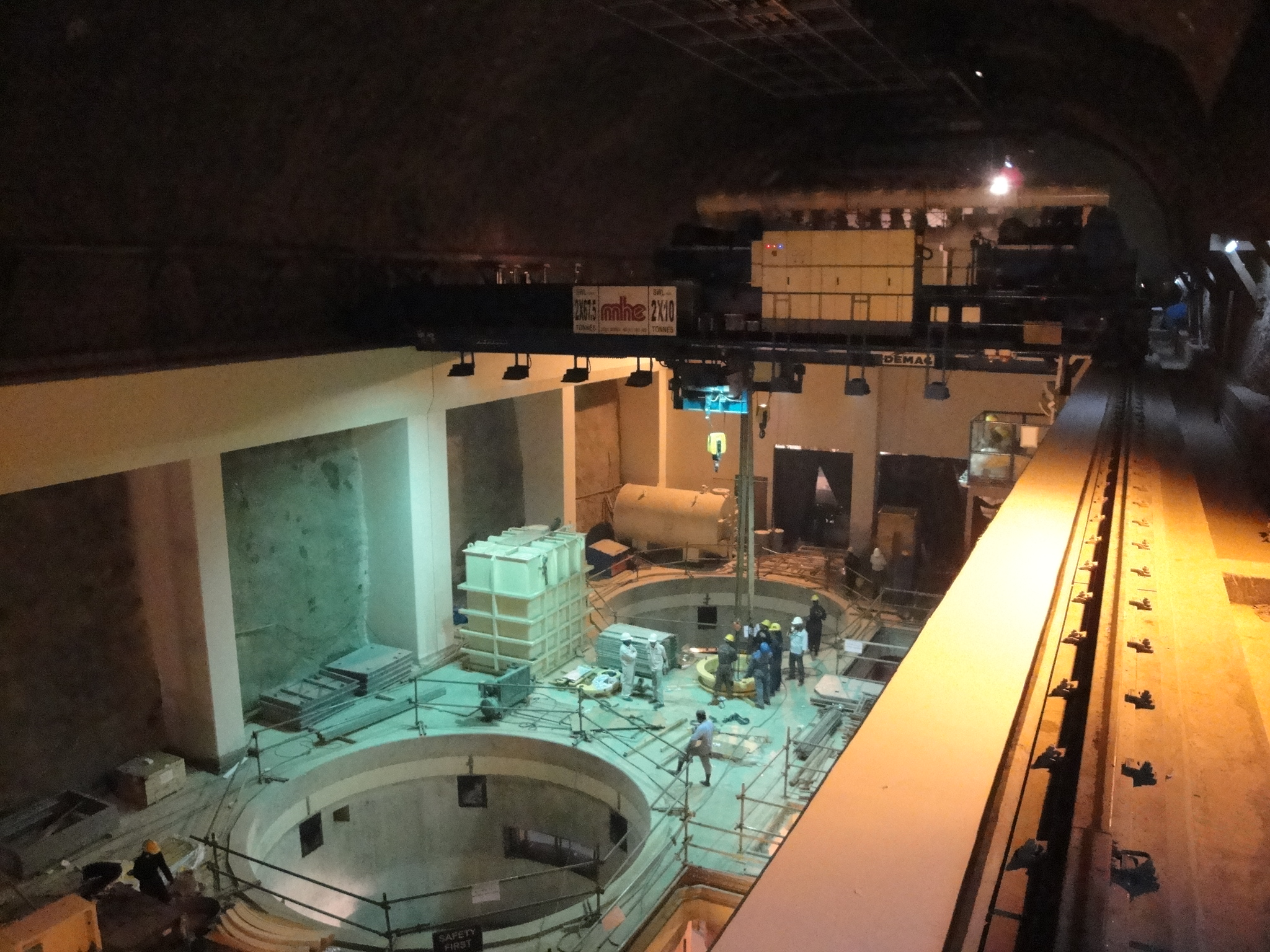
Underground Powerhouse during construction

The powerhouse measures 66.3 m (217.5 ft) long, 18.8 m (61.7 ft) wide, and 36.5 m (119.8 ft) tall, and is located underground at Niyamgamdora. It has installed electrical capacity of 150 MW from two 75 MW turbines, capable of producing up to 409 GWh of power annually. Water arrives at the powerhouse from the dam via the 12.89 km (8.0 mi) long Upper Kotmale Tunnel, which then feeds the 793 m (2,602 ft) penstock. The initial 745 m (2,444 ft) of the penstock is single-lane, while the latter 48 m (157 ft) splits into two lanes, feeding the two 75 MW generators respectively.

The powerhouse consists of the two three-phase 77 MW, 88,000 kVA vertical-axis Francis turbine-generators, two three-phase transformers, and a 220kV Gas Insulator Switchgear (GIS) substation. An outdoor switchyard measuring 36.5 m (119.8 ft) by 130 m (426.5 ft).

== Transmission line ==
The 220kV transmission line of the Upper Kotmale Hydro-power Project connects the power station located at Niyamgamdora, Kotmale, to the national grid via Kotmale switch yard located in Atabage, Gampola. The line consists of 45 towers and has a length of 15.5 km. The double circuit transmission line has a capacity of 220 MW per circuit.

== Social and environmental impact ==
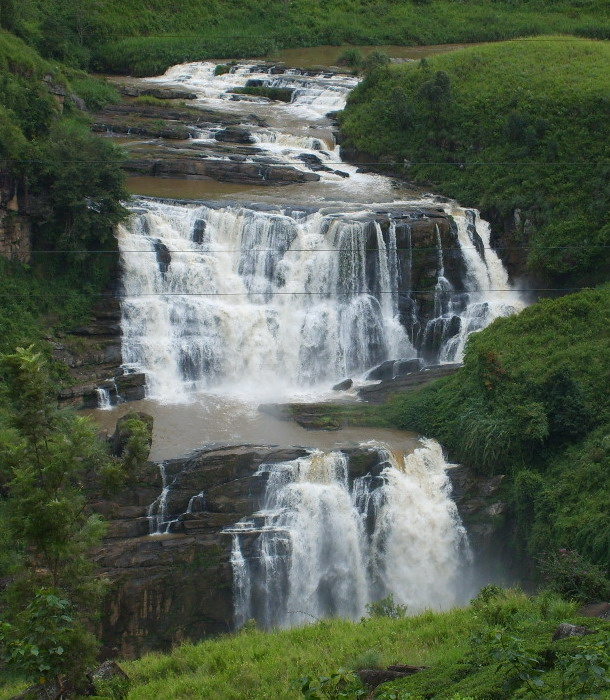
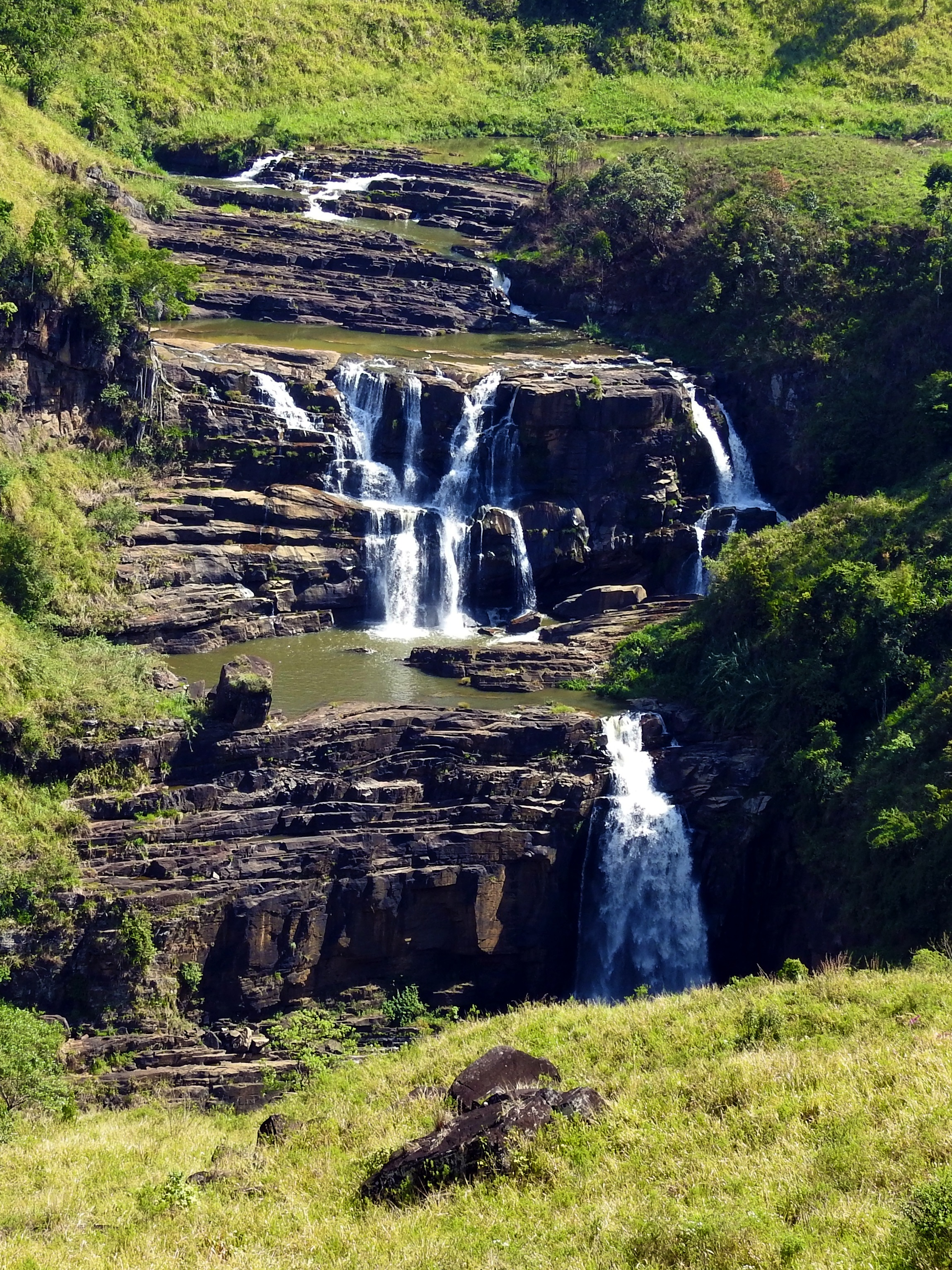
A significant difference in volume can be observed before the dam was built (left) and after (right). Note: The variance may be exaggerated, as the pictures were taken during different seasons.

The construction of the dam, tunnel, and powerhouse, required the relocation of families from 495 houses. New homes were built away from the site with access to vital facilities such as water and power. The relocated families are provided with concessionary loans to start new self-employment ventures, while additional facilities such as the Talawakele Central College, places of worship, a cinema hall, a library, and a community centre, are being established.

Similar most other dam's impacts on rivers around the world, the Upper Kotmale Dam will periodically stop the St. Clair's Falls, located 2.2 km (1.4 mi) downstream of the dam, and a further 2.9 km (1.8 mi) of the Kotmale River downstream of St. Clairs Falls, before the river is restored by water from the Devon River, the river forming the picturesque Devon Falls. As ordered by the Government Extraordinary, the St. Clair's waterfall will maintain a continuous flow of 47,250 m^{3} (1,668,618 ft^{3}) of water for 10 hours and 30 minutes daily, between sunrise and sunset.

== See also ==
- Electricity in Sri Lanka
- Kotmale Dam
- List of dams and reservoirs in Sri Lanka
- List of power stations in Sri Lanka
