= Kotmale Mahaweli Maha Seya =

Buddhist stupa in Sri Lanka

Kotmale Mahaweli Maha Seya කොත්මලේ මහාසෑය
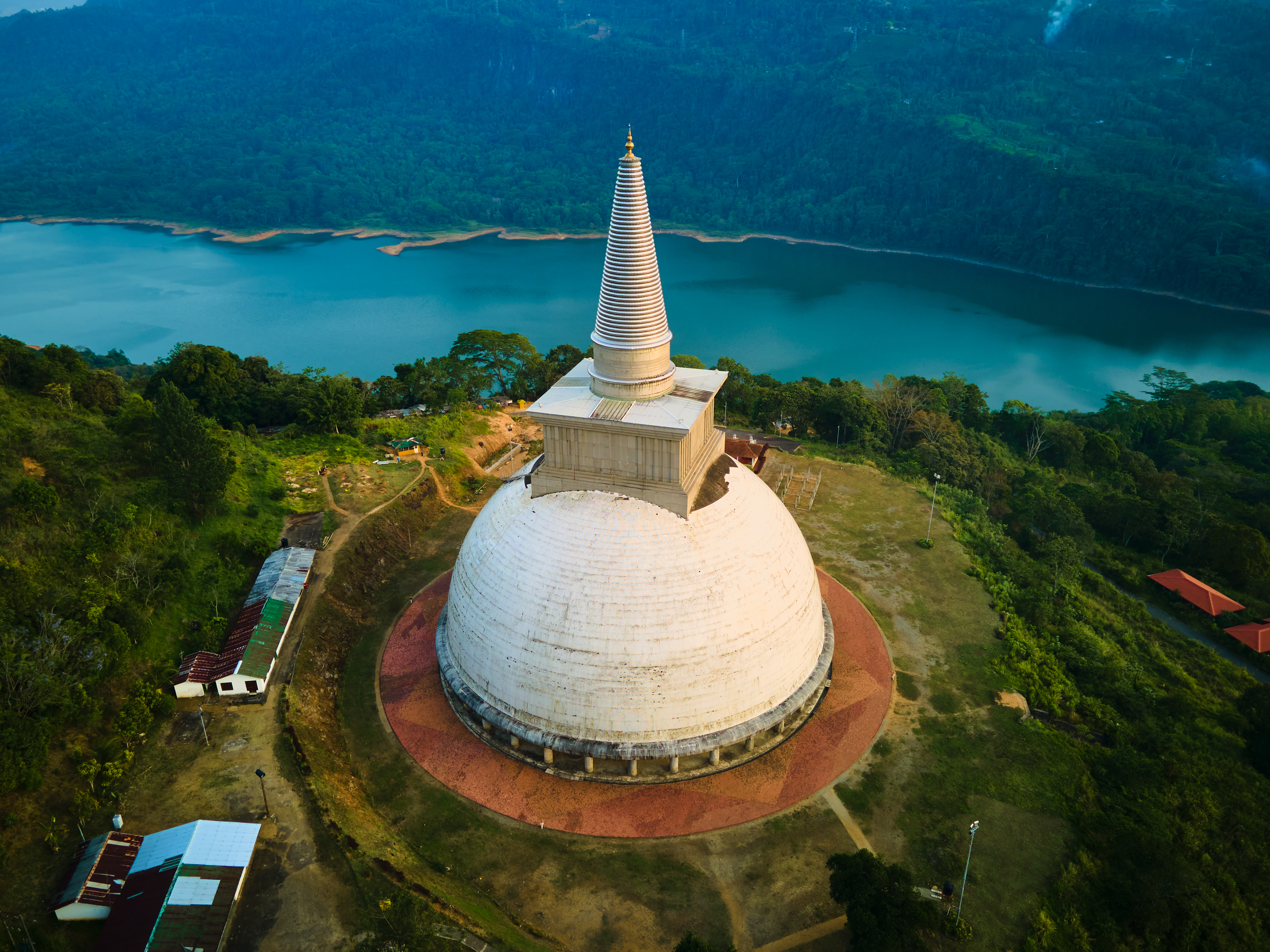

- Location in Sri Lanka

Religion
- Affiliation: Theravada Buddhism

Location
- Country: Sri Lanka
- Interactive map of Kotmale Mahaweli Maha Seya කොත්මලේ මහාසෑය
- Coordinates: 7°04′10.5″N 80°36′16.5″E

Architecture
- Founder: Gamini Dissanayake
- Completed: 1983

Kotmale Mahaweli Maha Seya is a stupa located in Kotmale, Sri Lanka.

== History ==
The stupa came from an idea by the former Minister of Mahaweli Development and then Leader of the Opposition, Gamini Dissanayake.

The stupa was built in commemoration of over 50 submerged temples and the people who lost their properties as a consequence of the Mahaweli Development programme in the early 1980s. The Mahaweli Development Project was the largest development project conducted in Sri Lanka after the country obtained independence.

The foundation stone was laid by President J. R. Jayewardene on 20 March 1983. The work was completed and the stupa was opened by President Maithripala Sirisena and Prime Minister Ranil Wickramasinghe on 20 June 2016.

The stupa is 88 m (289 ft) tall, making it the second-largest stupa in Sri Lanka, second to Ruwanweli Maha Seya in Anuradhapura, built in 140 BC. Its structure was designed by Vidya-Jyothi Dr. A.N.S. Kulasinghe.
