= Kotmale Dam =

Dam in Kotmale, Sri Lanka

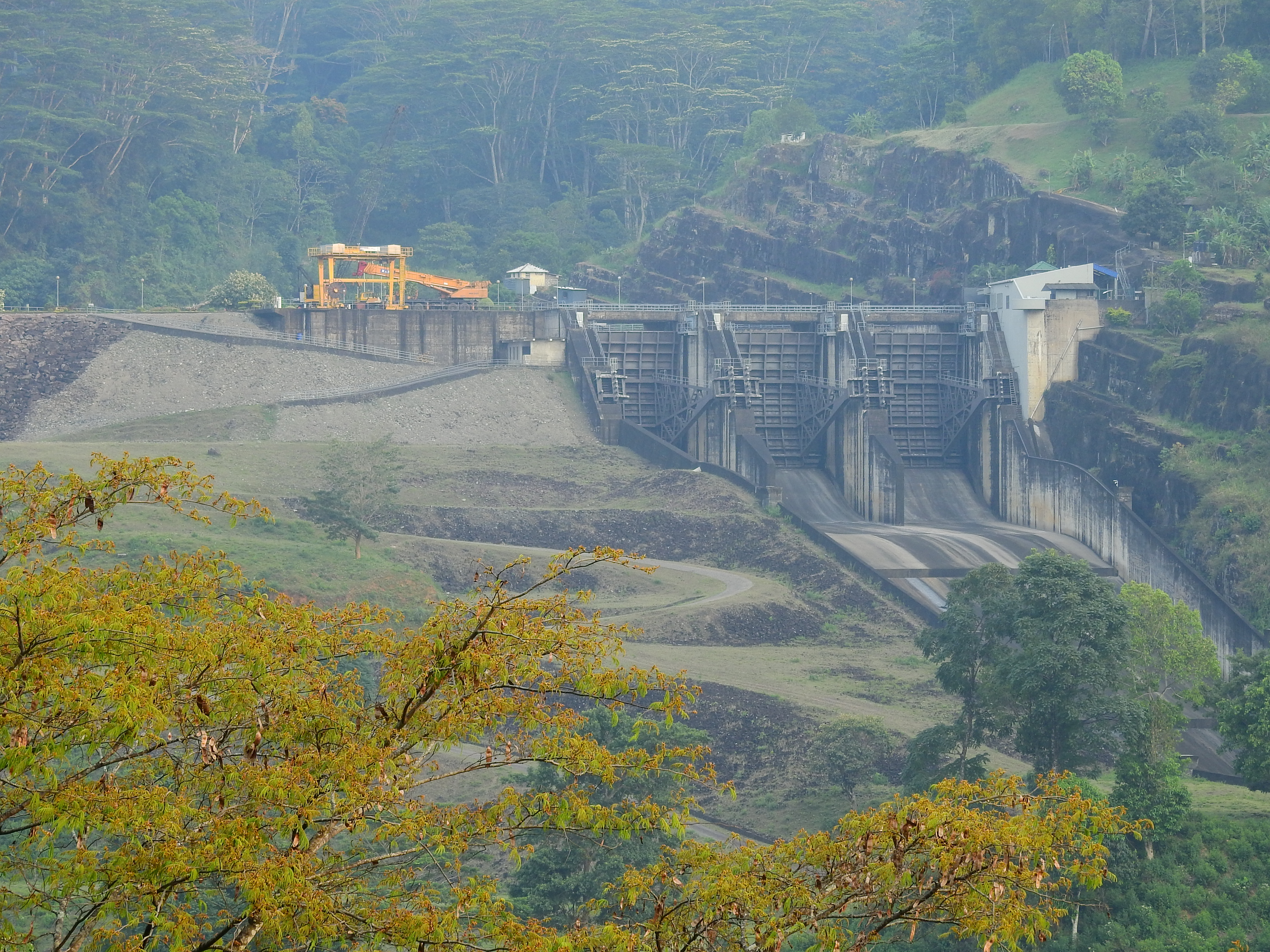
- Right bank of the dam, with spillways

- Location within Sri Lanka
- Country: Sri Lanka
- Location: Kotmale
- Coordinates: 07°03′39″N 80°35′50″E
- Purpose: Power
- Status: Operational
- Construction began: February 1979
- Opening date: August 1985
- Owner: Mahaweli Authority

Dam and spillways
- Type of dam: Embankment dam
- Impounds: Kotmale Oya
- Height (foundation): 87 m (285 ft)
- Length: 600 m (1,969 ft)
- Spillways: 3

Reservoir
- Creates: Gamini Dissanayake Reservoir

Kotmale Power Station
- Coordinates: 07°07′41″N 80°34′42″E
- Operator: Ceylon Electricity Board
- Turbines: 3 × 67 MW
- Installed capacity: 201 MW
- Annual generation: 450 GWh
- Website https://www.mahawelicomplex.lk/power-stations/kot/

The Kotmale Dam is a large hydroelectric and irrigation dam in Kotmale, Sri Lanka. The dam generates power from three 67 MW turbines, with a total installed capacity to 201 MW, making it the second largest hydroelectric power station in Sri Lanka. Construction on the dam began in August 1979 and was ceremonially completed in February 1985. The dam forms the Kotmale Reservoir, which was renamed to Gamini Dissanayake Reservoir on 11 April 2003 following a request by Prime Minister Ranil Wickramasinghe.

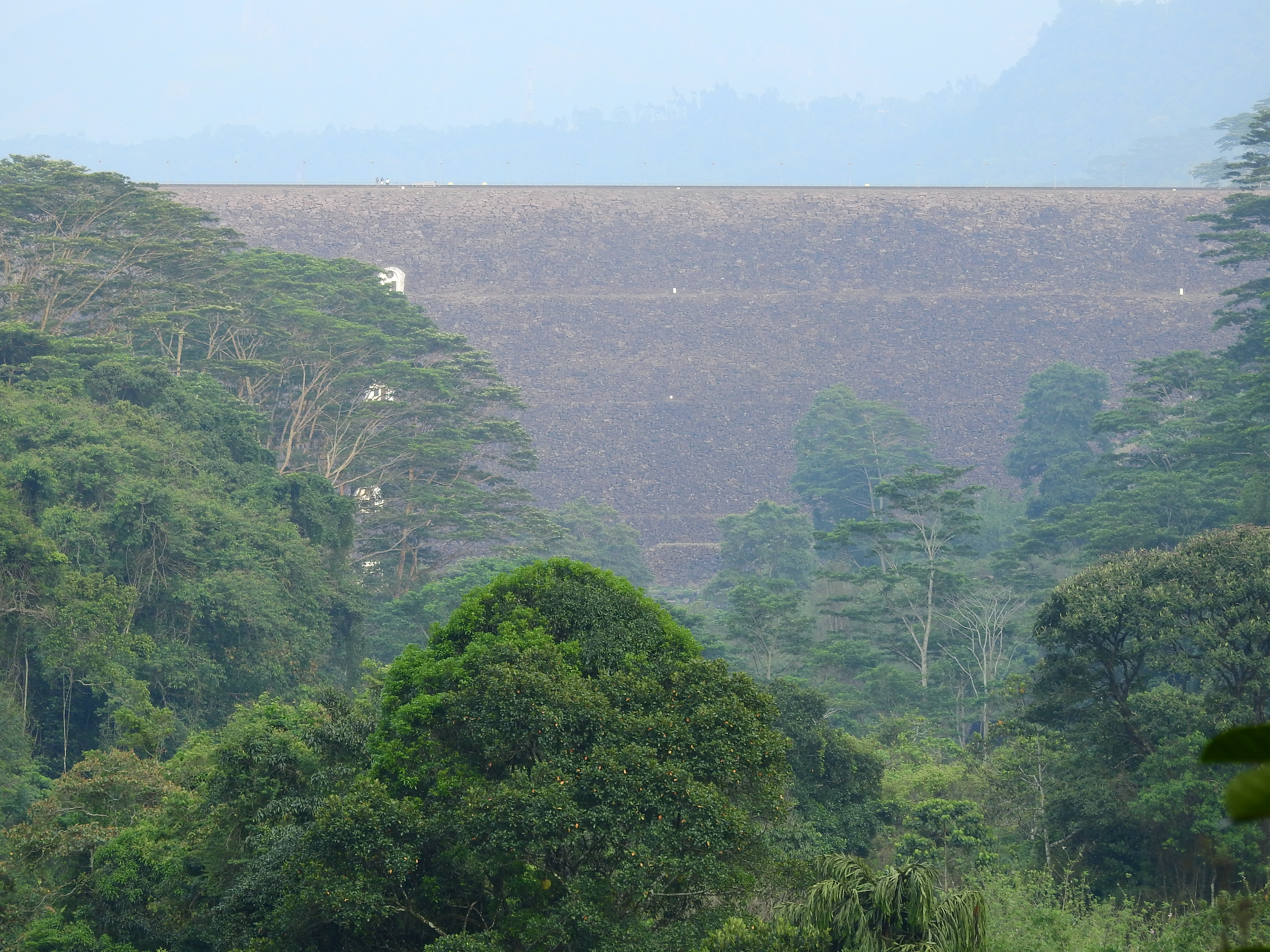
Downstream view of the 87m tall dam

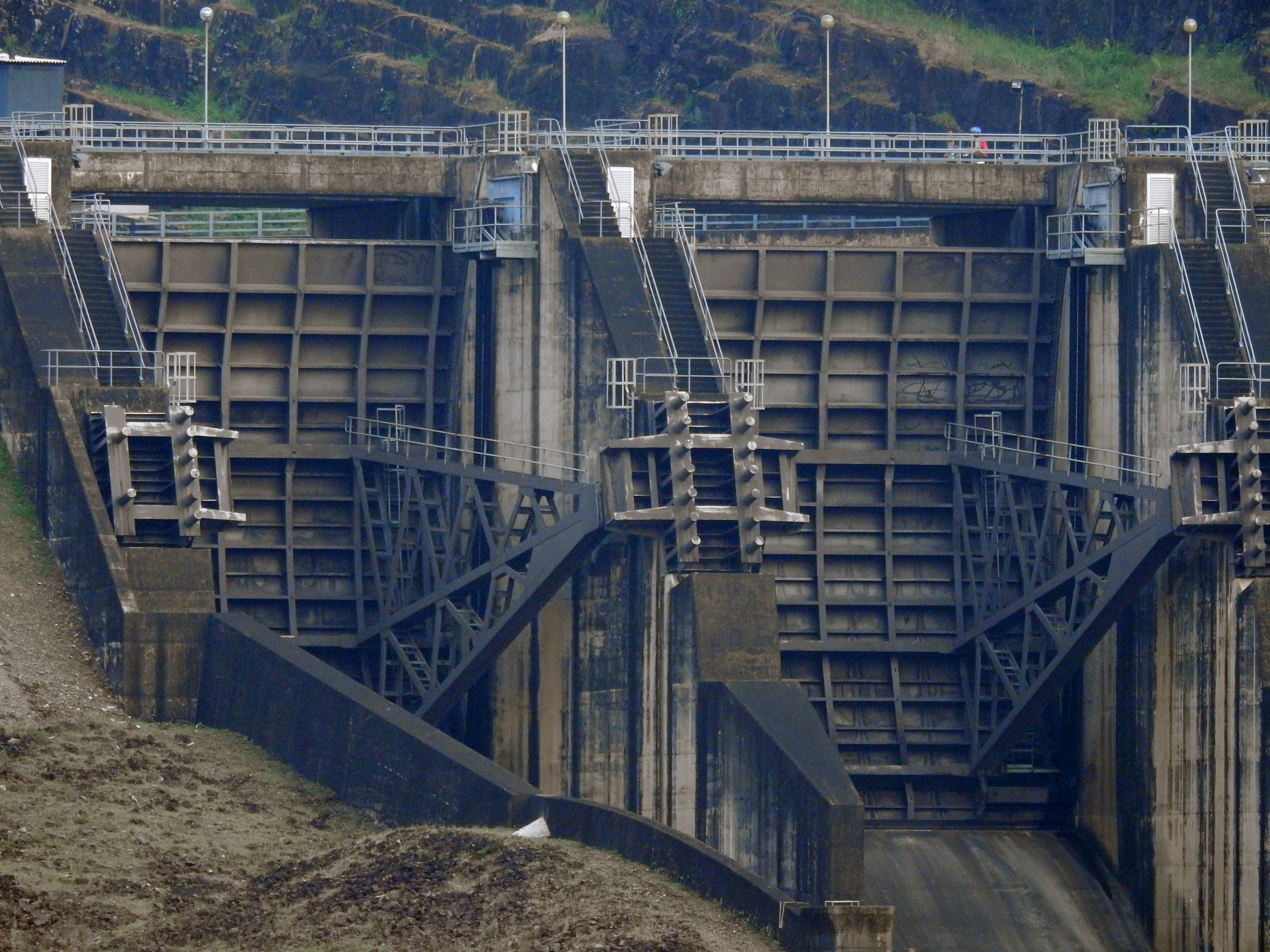
Closeup of spillways

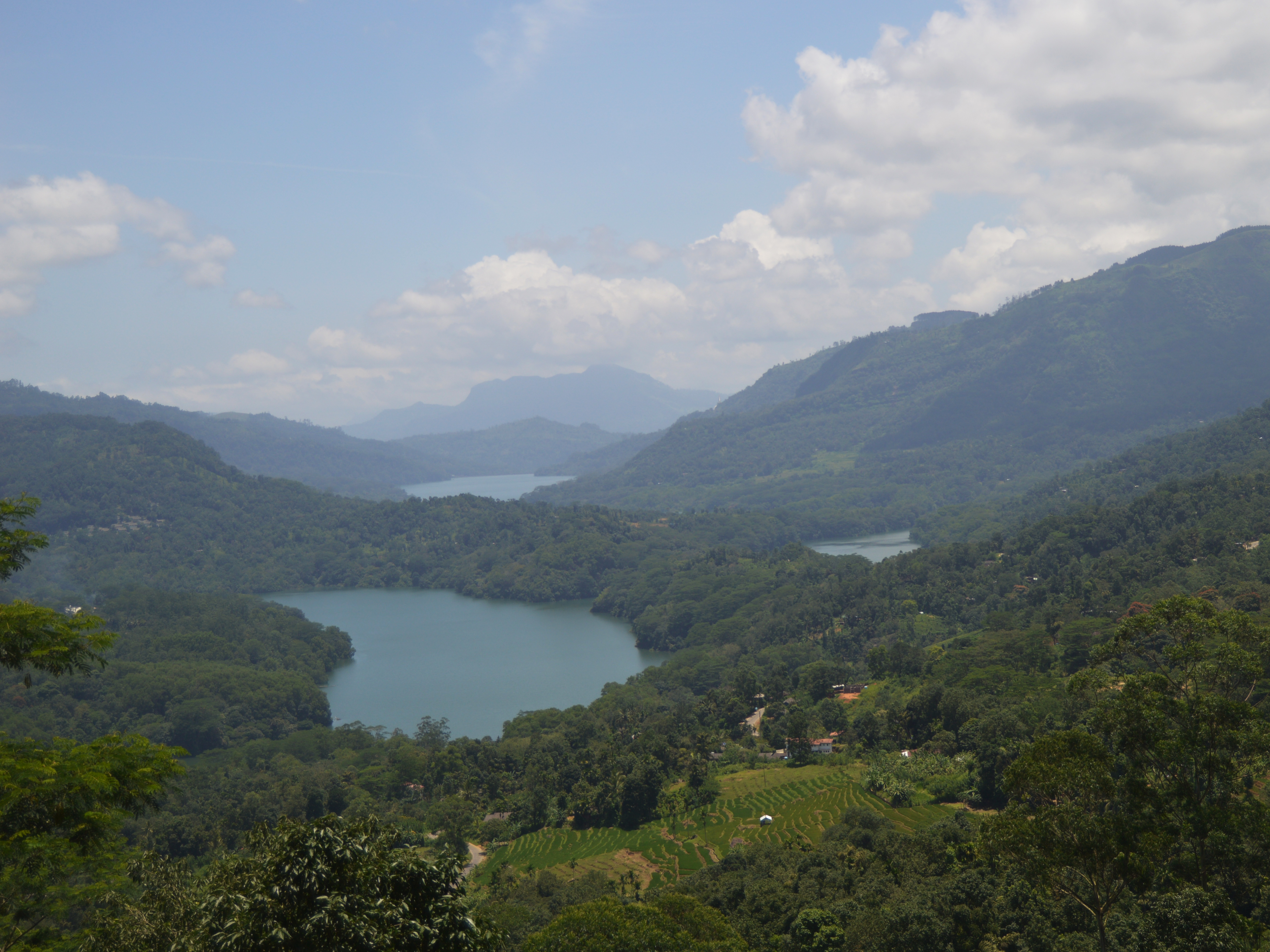
Gamini Dissanayake Reservoir

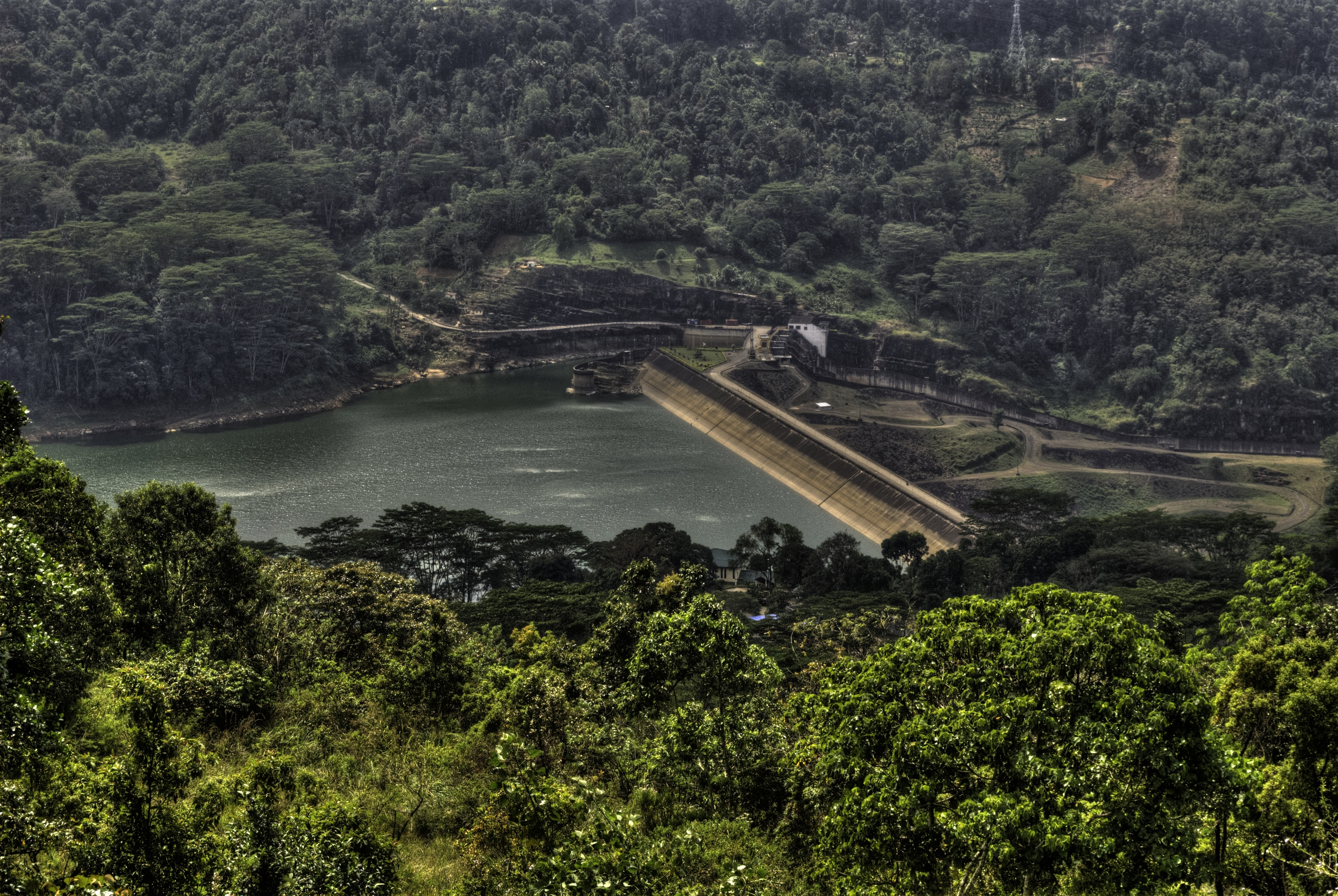

== See also ==
- List of power stations in Sri Lanka
- List of dams and reservoirs in Sri Lanka
- Upper Kotmale Dam
- Kadadora Vihara
