= Manchester, Bolivia =

Manchester
- Town
- Location in Bolivia
- Coordinates: 11°33′S 68°04′W
- Country: Bolivia
- Department: Pando Department
- Province: Nicolás Suárez Province
- Elevation: 604 ft (184 m)
- Time zone: UTC-4 (BOT)

Manchester is a remote town in the Pando Department of northern Bolivia, on the banks of the Manuripi River in Bolivian Amazonia. Manchester is about 60 miles (97 km) from the Department capital, Cobija. It was named after Manchester, England which was the hometown of an Englishman who created the settlement as a base for a rubber manufacturing industry in the area.

== History ==
The town was named after its founder Anthony Webster-James's hometown. Webster-James, whom was a metallurgical engineer from Manchester, England. He originally came to Bolivia to Potosí in order to invest in the silver mines there. He later moved up the country to set up a rubber refinery in the Pando area. He did this in association with Simon Patino towards the end of the 19th century. A workers' settlement grew up around the rubber refining facility, which Webster-James named Manchester, after his hometown. The project was considered unsuccessful and Webster-James left the rubber refining industry equipment and buildings there as well as the Manchester settlement where the former workers continued to reside. As there are few metalled roads in the region, most goods and people are transported by river.

Manchester is in a remote part of Bolivia, with no direct roads to the town. All transport is done via the Manuripi River, with it taking several days to reach the town. The town consists of huts being constructed around a football pitch, though it lacks a school and basic utilities of electricity and running water. Some tourist groups do fly over the town.
