= New Brighton, Johannesburg =

New Brighton
- Location within Gauteng Location within South Africa
- Coordinates: 26.088°S 28.029°E
- Country: South Africa
- Province: Gauteng
- Municipality: City of Johannesburg
- Main Place: Sandton

Area
  - Total: 0.50 km^{2} (0.19 sq mi)

Population (2011)
  - Total: 468
  - Density: 940/km^{2} (2,400/sq mi)

Racial makeup (2011)
  - Black African: 32.5%
  - Coloured: 4.3%
  - Indian/Asian: 11.8%
  - White: 51.1%
  - Other: 0.4%

First languages (2011)
  - English: 63.1%
  - Afrikaans: 11.8%
  - Zulu: 7.7%
  - Northern Sotho: 4.9%
  - Other: 12.5%
- Time zone: UTC+2 (SAST)
- PO box: 2196

New Brighton is a suburb of Johannesburg, South Africa. It is located on the border between Sandton and Randburg mainplaces.
