= Epsom Downs, Gauteng =

Epsom Downs
- Location within Gauteng Location within South Africa
- Coordinates: 26.044°S 28.006°E
- Country: South Africa
- Province: Gauteng
- Municipality: City of Johannesburg

Area
  - Total: 0.50 km^{2} (0.19 sq mi)

Population (2001)
  - Total: 611
  - Density: 1,200/km^{2} (3,200/sq mi)
- Time zone: UTC+2 (SAST)
- Postal code (street): 2191
- PO box: 2152

Epsom Downs is a suburb of Johannesburg, South Africa. It is located in Region E of the City of Johannesburg Metropolitan Municipality.
