= List of locations in Sri Lanka with an English name =

This is a list of places in Sri Lanka with an English name – i.e. names that were originally placenames in England later applied in Sri Lanka by English emigrants and explorers.

== Places where the corresponding place name in England is well known ==
- Abbotsleigh
- Adisham
- Alton
- Atherton
- Beaconsfield
- Blackpool
- Brampton
- Brookside
- Bray
- Carlabeck
- Chelsea
- Dalhousie
- Devon
- Drayton
- Great Western
- Hadley
- Harrow
- Hatherleigh
- Hatton – named after Hatton Garden
- Hayes
- Horton Plains
- Hopton
- Highforest
- Hythe
- Ingestre
- Kenilworth
- King's Lynn
- Kirkoswald
- Marlborough
- Middleton
- Norton
- Norwood
- Orwell
- Preston
- Rushbrook
- Rye
- Sherwood
- Somerset
- Springwood
- Stafford
- Stubbs
- Upcot
- Usk Valley
- Wavenden
- Waverly
- Westhall
- Westward Ho
- Wigton
