= Lake Gregory (Nuwara Eliya) =

Freshwater lake in Sri Lanka

Lake Gregory, Nuwara Eliya
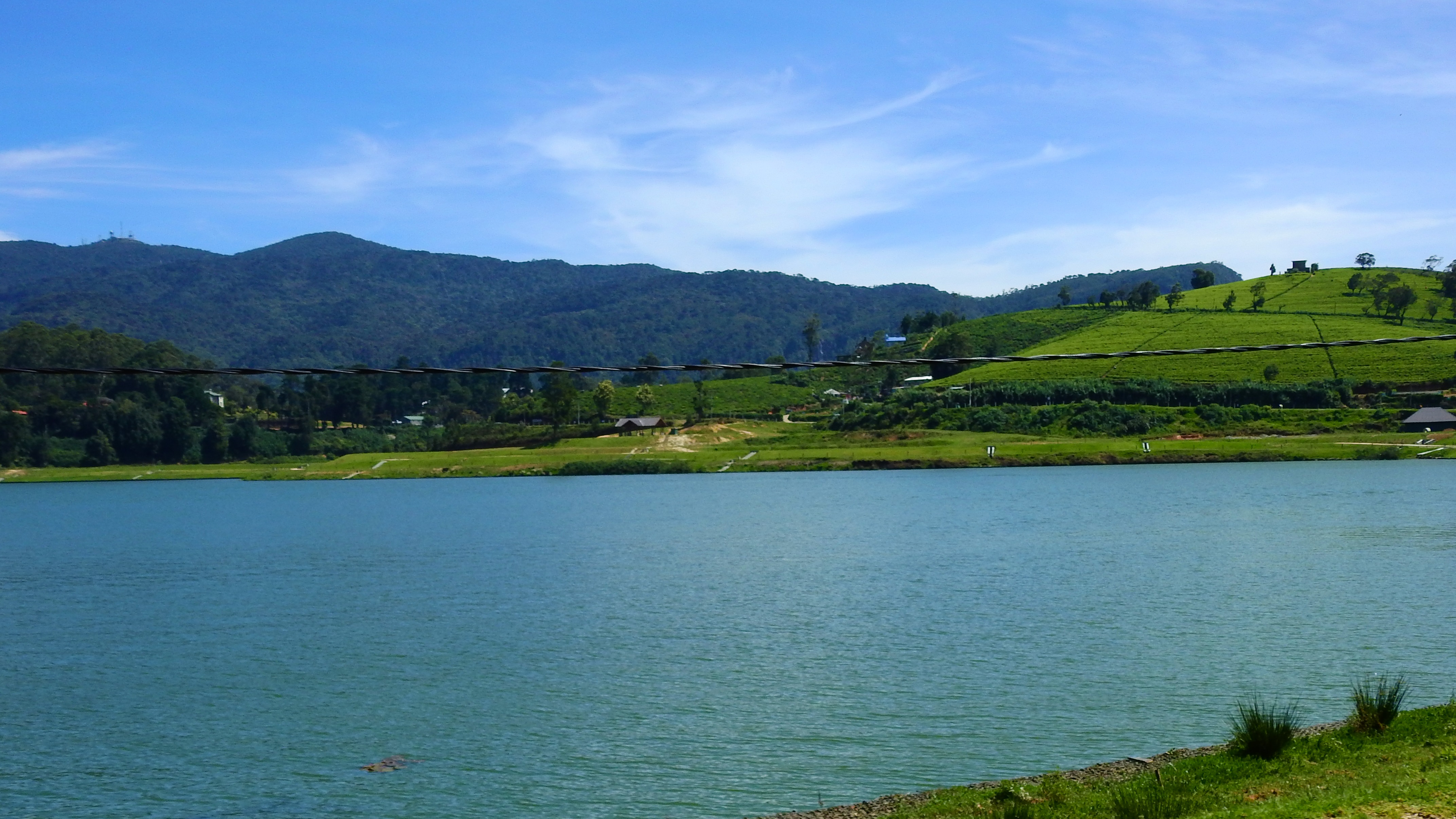

- Location within Sri Lanka
- Location: Nuwara Eliya
- Coordinates: 6.957°N 80.780°E
- Type: Reservoir
- Basin countries: Sri Lanka
- Built: 1873
- Surface area: 91.2 ha (225 acres)
- Surface elevation: 1,874 m (6,148 ft)
- Islands: One
- Settlements: Nuwara Eliya

Lake Gregory sometimes also called Gregory Lake or Gregory Reservoir, is a reservoir in the heart of the tea country hill city of Nuwara Eliya in Sri Lanka. Lake Gregory was created during the period of British Governor Sir William Gregory in 1873. The lake and the surrounding area make up the Gregory Lake Area.

== History ==
The area was originally a swampy bog at the foot of the small hills that border the town. In 1873 Sir William Gregory authorised the damming of the Thalagala stream, which originates from Mount Pidurutalagala, in order to make more land available for the expansion of the town. In 1881 the lake was stocked with trout by C. J. R. Le Mesurier (Assistant Government Agent for Nuwara Eliya).

In 1913 the waters of the lake were directed into a tunnel which flows to a hydro power station at 'Blackpool' between the town and Nanu Oya. The power station continues to supply electricity to the town to this day. In British times Lake Gregory was used for water sports and recreational activities.

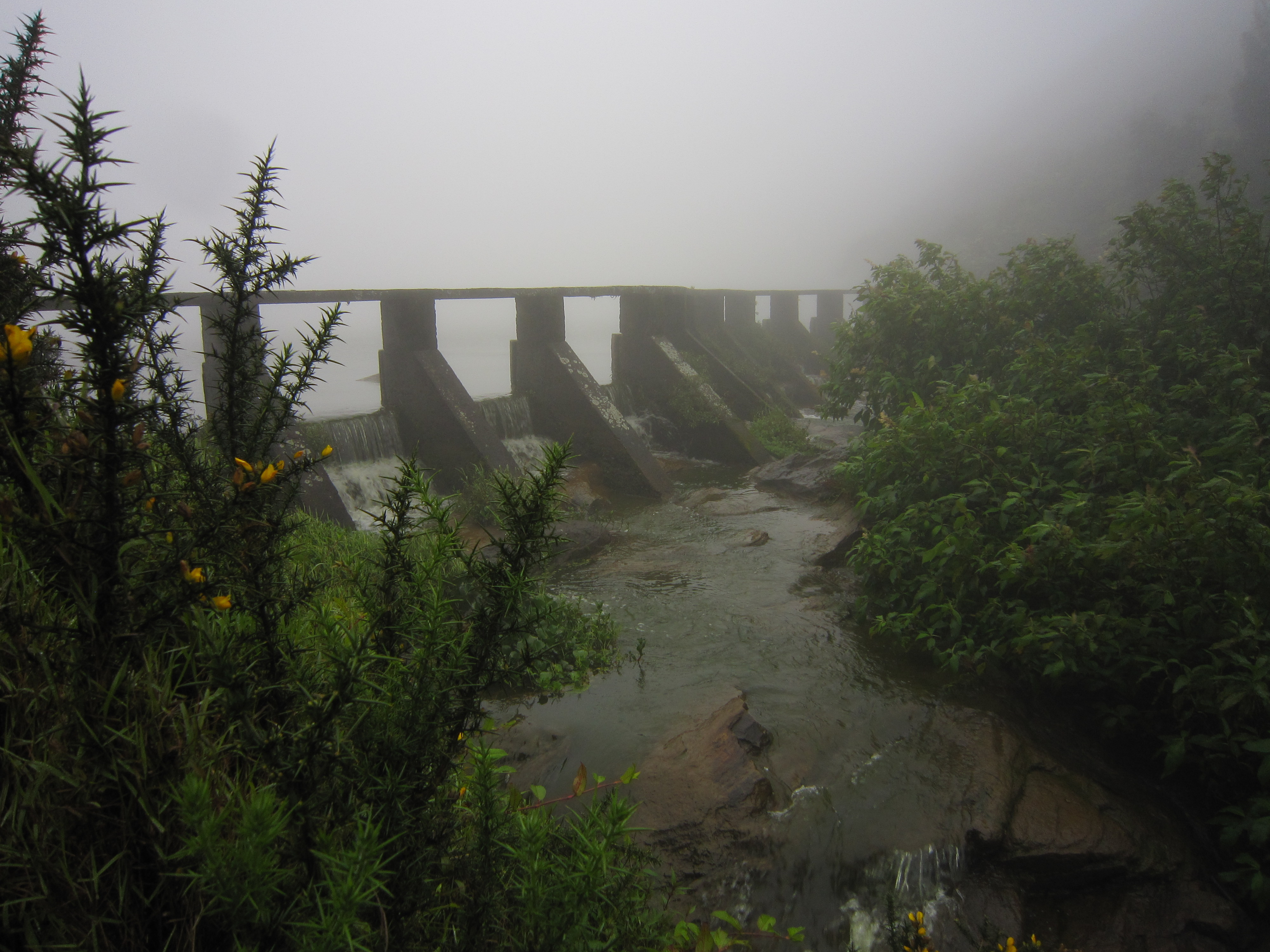
Part of the structure that supports the Gregory Reservoir.

== See also ==
- List of dams and reservoirs in Sri Lanka
