= Devon Falls =

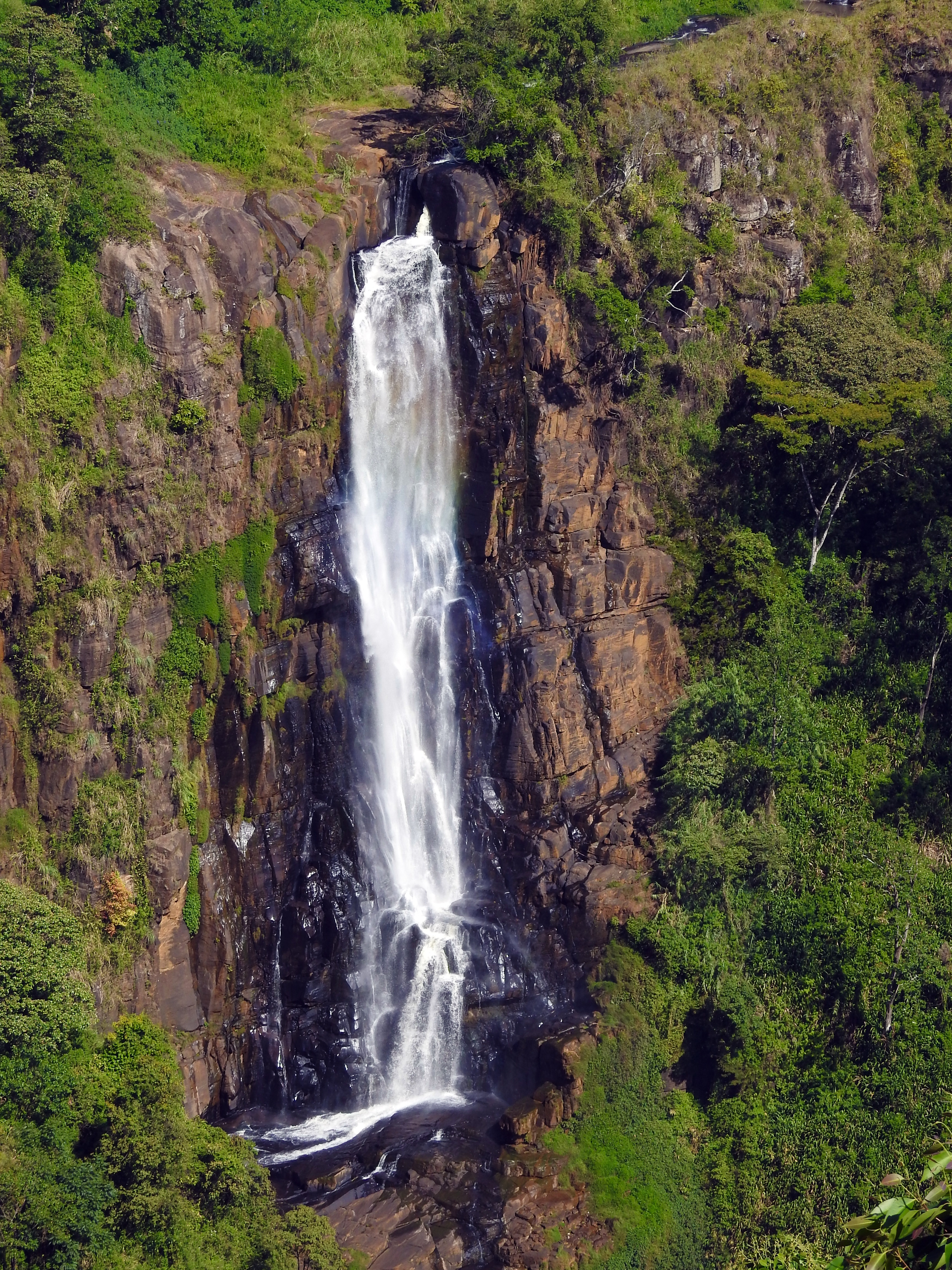
- Interactive map of Devon Falls
- Location: Talawakele, Sri Lanka
- Coordinates: 06°57′06″N 80°37′47″E
- Type: Tiered
- Elevation: 1,140 m (3,740 ft)
- Total height: 97 m (318 ft)
- Number of drops: 3
- Watercourse: A tributary of Kothmale Oya

Devon Falls, known as the 'Veil of the Valley', is a waterfall in Sri Lanka, situated 6 km (3.7 mi) west of Talawakele, Nuwara Eliya District on the A7 highway. The falls is named after a pioneer English coffee planter called Devon, whose plantation was situated nearby. The waterfall is 97 m (318 ft) high and is the 19th highest in the country. The falls are formed by a tributary of Kothmale Oya, which is a tributary of Mahaweli River. The elevation of Devon Falls is 1,140 m (3,740 ft) above sea level.

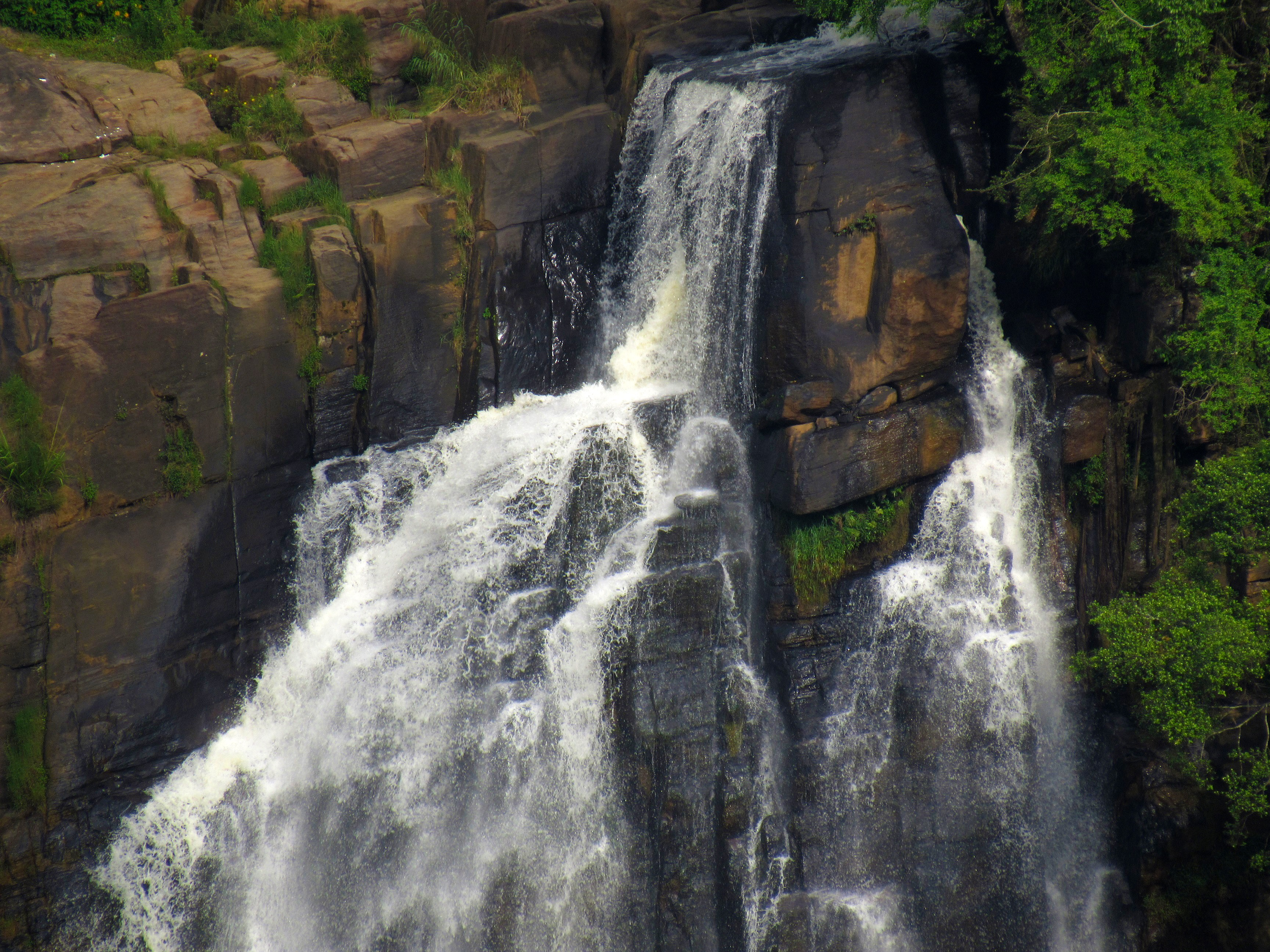
The waterfall in March 2018

== See also ==
- List of waterfalls
- List of waterfalls of Sri Lanka
- Place names in Sri Lanka with an English name
