= Kotmale Oya =

Coordinates: 06°57′15″N 80°36′26″E

Kotmale Oya Kotmale River
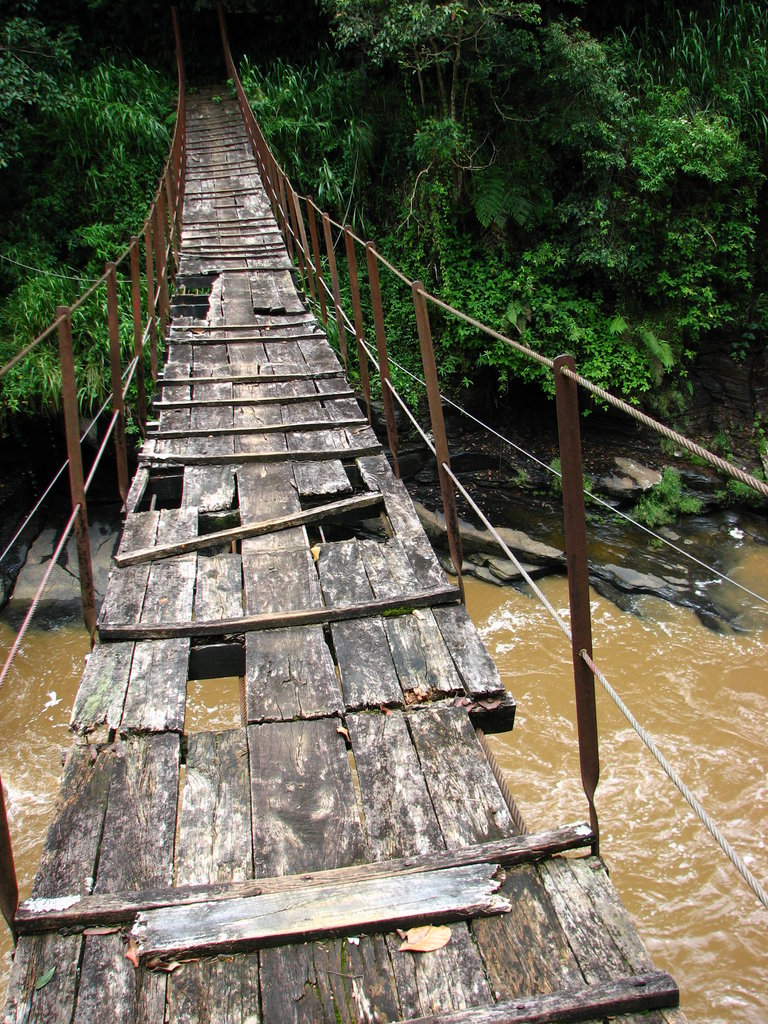
- Footbridge over the Kotmale Oya
- Native name: කොත්මලේ ඔය (Sinhala)

Location
- Country: Sri Lanka
- Towns: Kotmale, Nawalapitiya

Physical characteristics
- Source: Horton Plains National Park
  - location: Central Province, Sri Lanka
- Mouth: Mahaweli River
  - location: Pallegama
- Length: 70 km (43 mi)

The Kotmale River (Sinhala: කොත්මලේ ඔය) is the longest tributary of Mahaweli River. The river begins as the Agra Oya, in the Horton Plains. The Central Plains have an annual rainfall of between 125 and 200 inches a year. The river is approximately 70 km (43 mi) long and drains a basin of about 58,534 ha (226 square miles). The river flows through a traditional area of ancient villages and tea plantations. King Dutugemunu spent his youth here. The Kotmale Oya flows into the Mahaweli at Polwathura Pallegama. Tributaries of the Kotmale Oya include the Nanu Oya, the Pundalu Oya, the Puna Oya, and the Dambagastalawa Oya.

The river was dammed between 1979 and 1985 as part of a hydro-electric project within the Accelerated Mahaweli Ganga scheme. The opening ceremony took place in August 1985. Some 3,000 families had to be relocated to higher ground. The area has a history of geological instability.

== See also ==
- List of rivers of Sri Lanka
- St. Clairs Falls
- Devon Falls
- Kotmale Dam
- Upper Kotmale Dam
