= Mahaweli River =

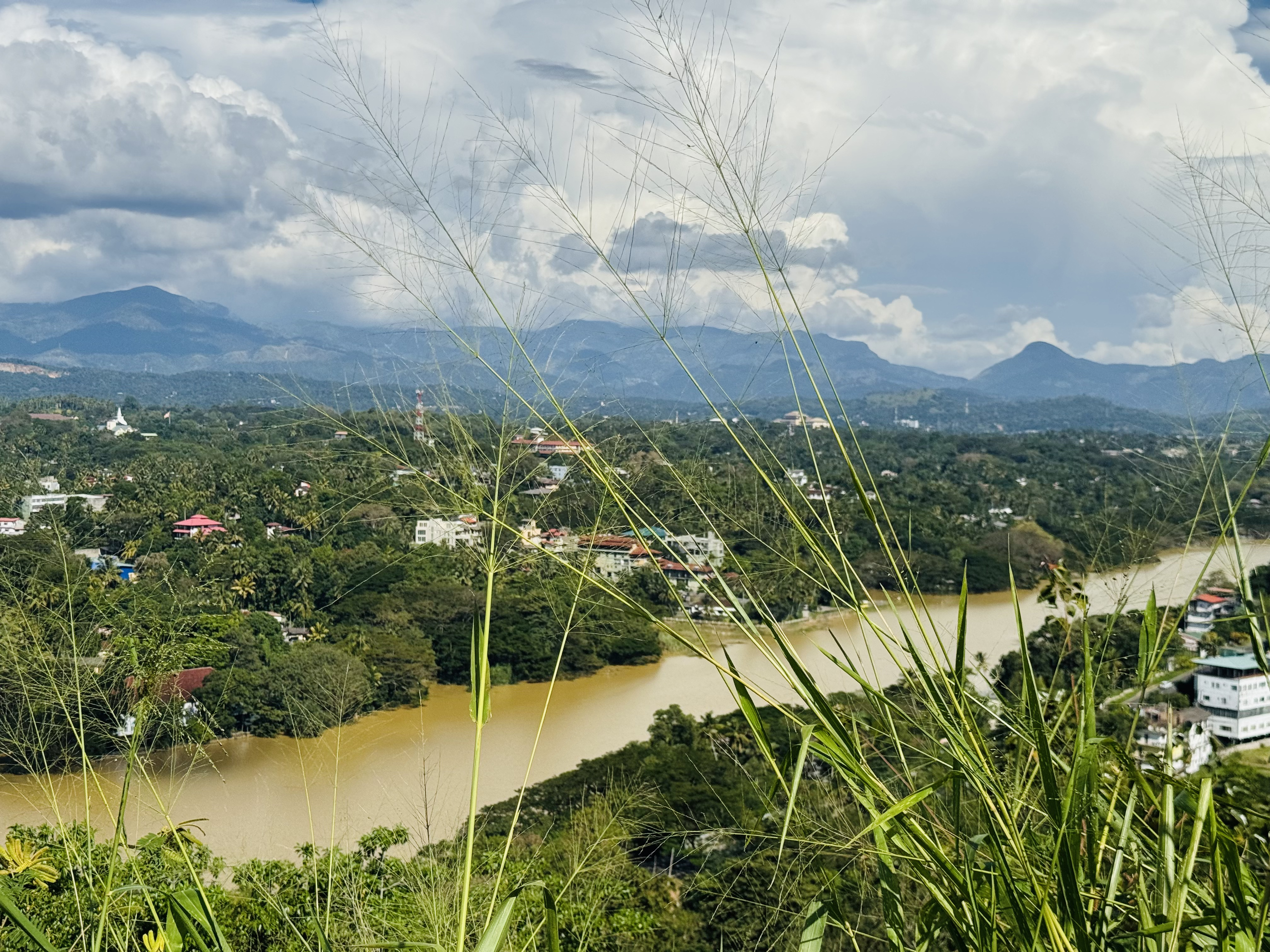
- Mahaweli River flowing through Thennakumbura
- Native name: මහවැලි ගඟ (Sinhala); மகாவலி ஆறு (Tamil)

Location
- Country: Sri Lanka

Physical characteristics
- Source
  - location: Horton Plains National Park
- Mouth: Bay of Bengal
  - location: Trincomalee Bay
  - coordinates: 08°27′34″N 81°13′46″E
- Length: 335 km (208 mi)
- Basin size: 10,448 km2

Basin features
- Tributaries
  - left: Amban Ganga
  - right: Kotmale Oya

The Mahaweli River (Sinhala: මහවැලි ගඟ, literally "Great Sandy River"; Tamil: மகாவலி ஆறு [mahawali gangai]), is a 335-kilometre-long (208-mile) river, ranking as the longest river in Sri Lanka. It has a drainage basin of 10,448 km^{2} (4,034 sq mi), the largest in the country, which covers almost one-fifth of the total area of the island. Though the Mahaweli Ganga originated beginning at Horton plains Kirigalpoththa, the namely starts at Polwathura (in the Mahawilla area), a remote village of Nuwara Eliya District in bank Nawalapitiya of Kandy District by further joining of Hatton Oya and Kotmale Oya. The river reaches the Bay of Bengal on the southwestern side of Trincomalee Bay. The bay includes the first of a number of submarine canyons, making Trincomalee one of the finest natural deep-sea harbours in the world.

As part of Mahaweli Development programme, the river and its tributaries are dammed at several locations to allow irrigation in the dry zone, with almost 1,000 km^{2} (390 sq mi) of land irrigated. The production of hydroelectricity from six dams in the Mahaweli system supplies more than 40% of Sri Lanka's electricity needs. One of the many sources of the river is the Kotmale Oya.

There is a misconception in Sri Lanka that the Mahaweli starts at Sri Pada Mountain. The Mahaweli gets its source waters from Horton Plains in Kirigalpoththa and the Thotupola mountain range.

== Tributaries ==
- Nanu Oya
- Puna Oya
- Pundalu Oya
- Kotmale Oya
- Hatton Oya
- Atabage Oya
- Nilamba Oya
- Nanu Oya (Peradeniya)
- Thalathu Oya
- Hulu Ganga
- Heen Ganga
- Beli Ul Oya
- Kirindi Oya
- Loggal Oya
- Uma Oya
- Badulu Oya
- Kalu Ganga (Tributary)
- Amban Ganga
- Gin Oya

== Starting of Mahaweli ==
The Mahaweli River starts from Polwathura/Mahavila area with its water source starting from the Horton Plains National Park.

== Gallery ==
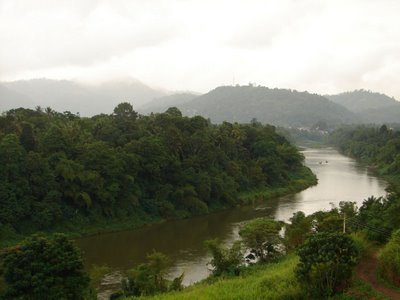
Mahaweli river flowing through Gampola

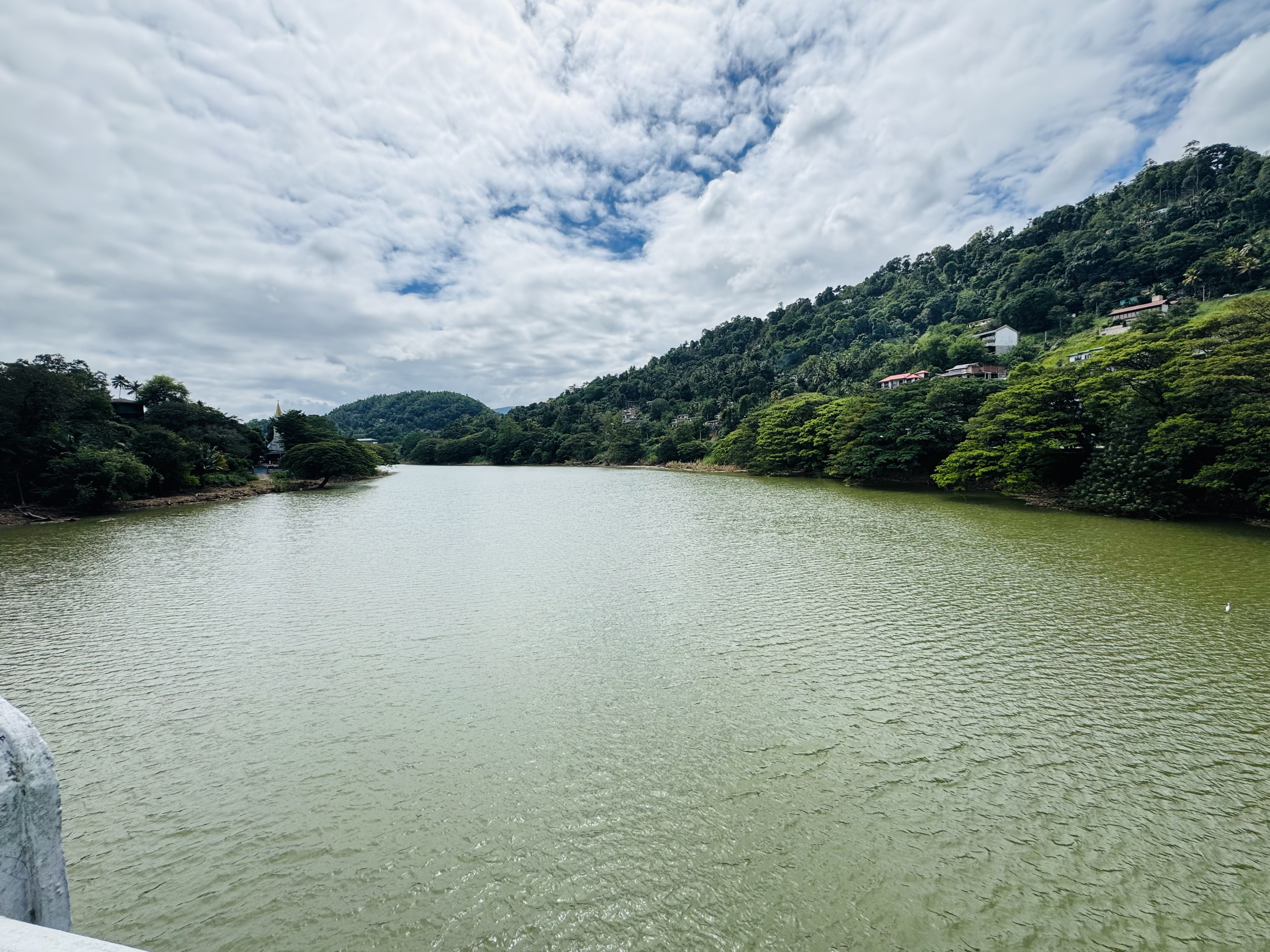
Mahaweli river at Thennekumbura bridge

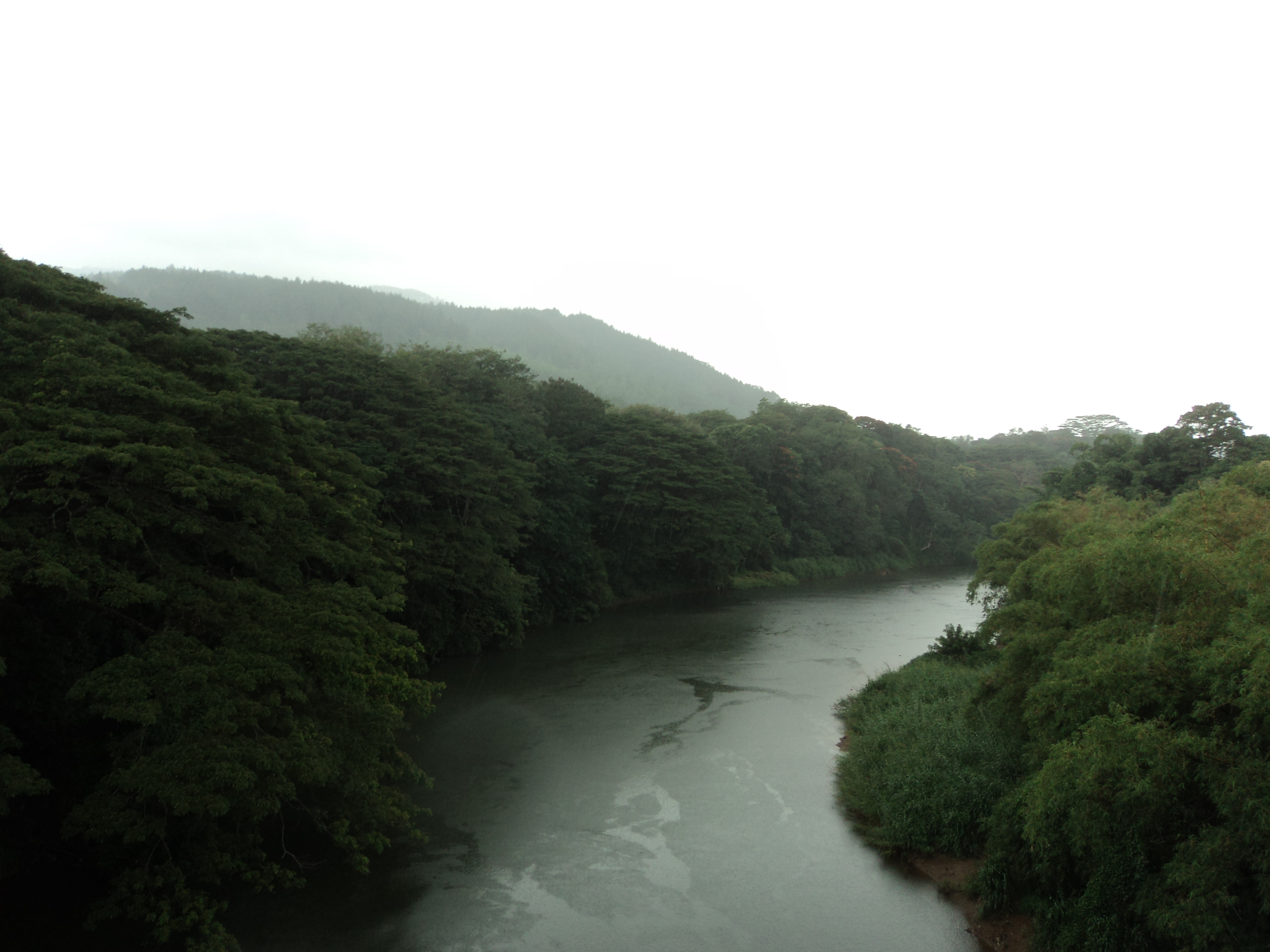
Mahaveli River near university of Peradeniya

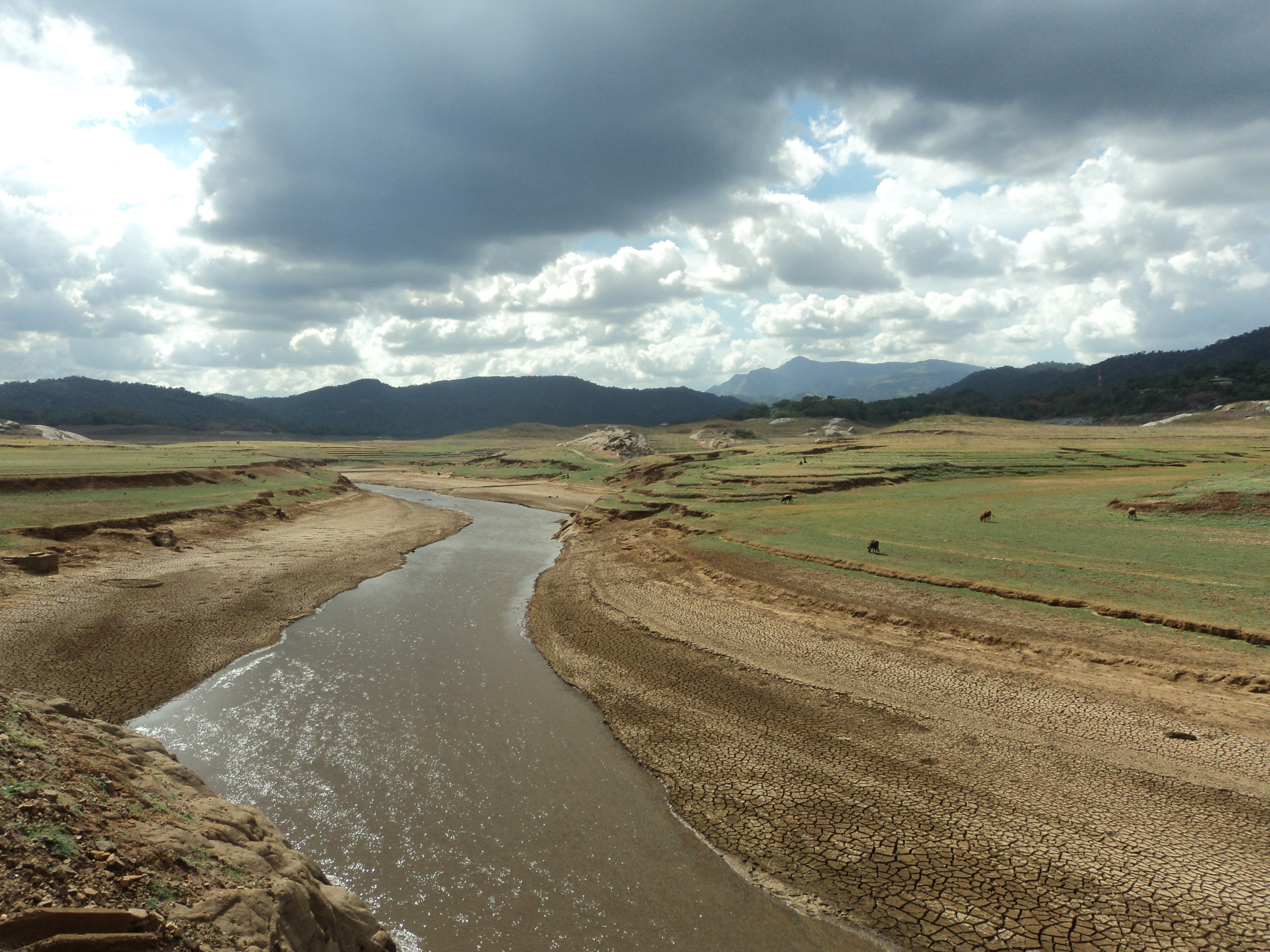
Mahaweli River at sunken city of Teldeniya victoria reservoir sri lanka

Thennekumbura Bridge over the Mahaweli river

== See also ==
- List of rivers in Sri Lanka
- Mahaweli Development programme
