= Vanni (Sri Lanka) =

Geographic area in Sri Lanka

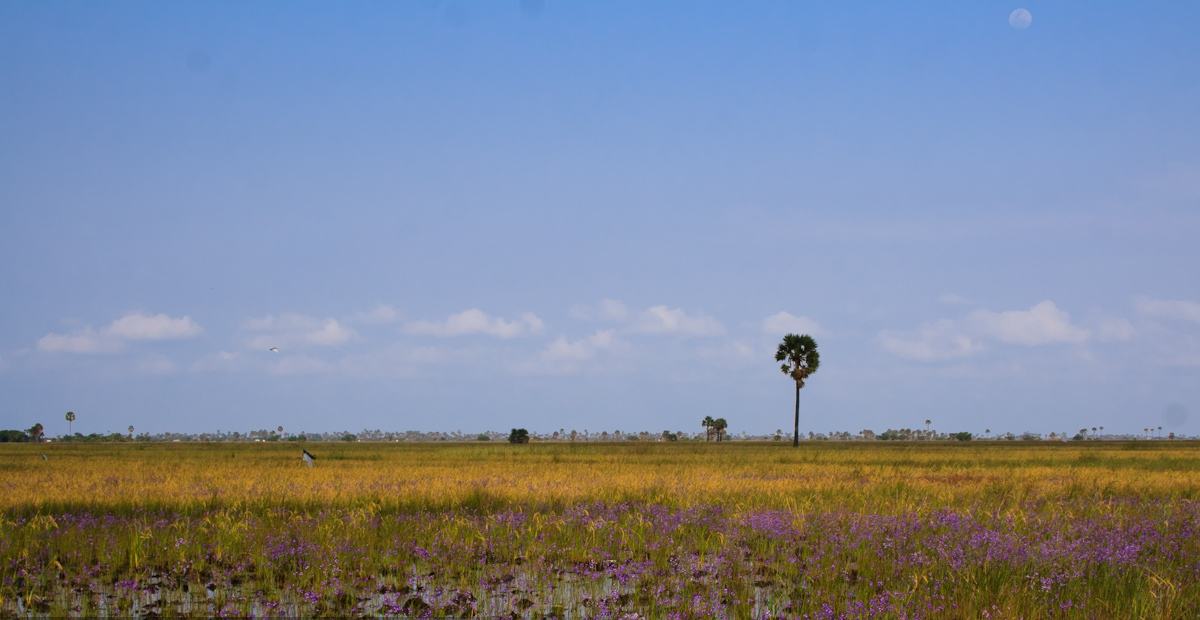
A typical Vanni landscape

The Vanni, also spelled Wanni, is the name given to the mainland area of the Northern Province of Sri Lanka. It covers the entirety of Mannar, Mullaitivu and Vavuniya Districts, and most of Kilinochchi District. It has an area of approximately 7,650 square kilometres (2,950 sq mi). The population and infrastructure of the Vanni were devastated by the Sri Lankan Civil War.

== History ==
Tamil feudal chiefs called Vanniar chiefs cultivated the Vanni in the first millennium of the Common Era governing what were called Vannimai, the Jaffna Kingdom's land divisions located south of the Jaffna Peninsula in the present-day Northern, North Central and Eastern provinces of Sri Lanka.

The Vanni was further irrigated and cultivated under British rule in the 1930s. Due to overcrowding in Jaffna, people were moved into the Vanni to farm the newly-irrigated land.

The Vanni was the LTTE stronghold during the civil war, especially after the recapture of Jaffna by government forces in 1995. After 2009, the fighting had resulted in the destruction of three quarters of all houses in the region. Fields were destroyed and documentation was lost, making it difficult for families to prove they had a right to occupy the land. As a result, poverty continues to be an ongoing problem in the region, despite a reduction in poverty in most other parts of Sri Lanka. Militarisation of the area also hinders development and local livelihoods.

As of 2018, most of the land in the Vanni is owned by the government, and residents are given permits to occupy and farm the land.

== Geography ==
Geographically, the Vanni is distinct from the Jaffna Peninsula, the other area of the Northern Province. The Jaffna peninsula is irrigated by wells fed by aquifers whereas the Vanni has irrigation tanks fed by perennial rivers. Major rivers include: Akkarayan Aru, Aruvi Aru, Kanakarayan Aru, Kodalikkallu Aru, Mandekal Aru, two called Nay Aru, Netheli Aru, Pali Aru, Pallavarayankaddu Aru, Parangi Aru, Per Aru, Piramenthal Aru, Theravil Aru. There are also a number of lagoons around the Vanni, the largest being Jaffna Lagoon, Nanthi Kadal, Chundikkulam Lagoon, Kokkilai Lagoon, Nai Aru Lagoon and Chalai Lagoon.

Much of the Vanni is covered by dry zone evergreen forest.

== Demographics ==
The Vanni had a population of nearly 700,000 in 2007, making it one of the most sparsely populated areas of Sri Lanka. However, the area's population figures have been highly volatile due to massive displacement caused by the Sri Lankan Civil War. In 2018, the population of the area had decreased to 475,000. At the end of 2017 there were still 4719 internally-displaced persons in the Vanni, compared with 34,000 in Jaffna.
