= List of rivers of Sri Lanka =

Places of tourists' interest

Map showing the locations of river mouths

The following table lists most rivers of Sri Lanka. Since Sri Lanka is a trilingual country, some rivers may have a Sinhala name (i.e. Kalu Ganga), while other have an English or a Tamil name (i.e. Kelani River). There are two words meaning "river" in the Sinhala language, namely Ganga (ගඟ) and Oya (ඔය), of which the usage of both terms is arbitrary. At 335 km (208 mi), the Mahaweli River is the longest river on the island, its drainage basin covering more than one-fifth of the island. It is estimated that there are 103 rivers in Sri Lanka.

== List of major rivers (over 100km in length) ==
Name	Map	Length	Source	Drainage	Image	Location of mouth	Ref
Mahaweli River		335 km (208 mi)	Horton Plains	Trincomalee		08°27′34″N 81°13′46″E	
Malvathu River	Map of Malwathu Oya	164 km (102 mi)	Inamaluwa Mountains	Vankalai		08°48′08″N 79°55′40″E	
Kala Oya	Map of Kala Oya	148 km (92 mi)	Matale Hills near Nalanda	Gangevadiya Wilpattu		08°17′41″N 79°50′23″E	
Kelani River	Map of Kelani River	145 km (90 mi)	Horton Plains	Colombo		06°58′44″N 79°52′12″E	
Yan Oya	Map of Yan Oya	142 km (88 mi)	Ritigala	Pulmoddai		08°55′04″N 81°00′58″E	
Deduru Oya	Map of Deduru Oya	142 km (88 mi)	Gommuna Mountains	Chilaw		07°36′50″N 79°48′12″E	
Walawe River	Map of Walawe River	138 km (86 mi)	Horton Plains	Ambalantota		06°06′19″N 81°00′57″E	
Maduru Oya		135 km (84 mi)	Akurugala Mountains	Kalkudah		07°56′24″N 81°33′05″E	
Maha Oya		134 km (83 mi)	Rakshawa Mountains	Kochchikade		07°16′21″N 79°50′34″E	
Kalu Ganga		129 km (80 mi)	Peak Wilderness Sanctuary	Kalutara		06°34′10″N 79°57′44″E	
Kirindi Oya		117 km (73 mi)	Namunukula	Bundala		06°11′39″N 81°17′34″E	
Kumbukkan Oya		116 km (72 mi)	Lunugala	Kumana		06°48′36″N 81°49′25″E	
Menik Ganga		114 km (71 mi)	Namunukula	Yala		06°21′49″N 81°31′45″E	
Gin Ganga		113 km (70 mi)	Kabaragala Mountains	Gintota		06°03′47″N 80°10′27″E	
Mi Oya		109 km (68 mi)	Kuda Madagala Mountains	Puttalam North		08°05′44″N 79°48′37″E	
Gal Oya		108 km (67 mi)	Hewa Eliya Mountains	Oluvil		07°18′01″N 81°51′54″E	

== List of minor rivers (up to 100km in length) ==
Name	Length	Source	Drainage	Location of mouth	Ref
Attanagalu Oya	76 km (47 mi)	Kegalle District	Negombo Lagoon		
Nilwala Ganga	72 km (45 mi)	Rakwana Mountains	Indian Ocean	5°57′N 80°32′E	
Kanakarayan Aru	70 km (43 mi)	Semamadu Kulam	Chundikkulam Lagoon		
Kotmale River	70 km (43 mi)	Horton Plains National Park	Mahaweli River		
Parangi Aru	60 km (37 mi)	Vavuniya District	Palk Strait		
Kehelgamu Oya	50 km (31 mi)	Horton Plains	Kelani River		
Pali Aru	50 km (31 mi)	Puliyankulam	Palk Strait		
Maskeliya Oya	40 km (25 mi)	Peak Wilderness Sanctuary	Kelani River		
Nay Aru	40 km (25 mi)	Vavuniya District	Palk Strait		
Per Aru	32 km (20 mi)	Vavuniya District	Nanthi Lagoon		
Mandekal Aru	30 km (19 mi)	Mullaitivu District	Palk Strait		
Nanu Oya	27 km (17 mi)	Pidurutalagala	Kotmale River		
Pallavarayankaddu Aru	27 km (17 mi)	Mullaitivu District	Palk Strait		
Akkarayan Aru	25 km (16 mi)	Mullaitivu District	Jaffna Lagoon		
Netheli Aru	24 km (15 mi)	Mullaitivu District	Chundikkulam Lagoon		
Theravil Aru	23 km (14 mi)	Mullaitivu District	Chundikkulam Lagoon		
Nay Aru	20 km (12 mi)	Mullaitivu District	Nai Aru Lagoon		
Piramenthal Aru	20 km (12 mi)	Mullaitivu District	Chundikkulam Lagoon		
Kodalikkallu Aru	19 km (12 mi)	Mullaitivu District	Nanthi Lagoon		
Valukkai Aru	16 km (10 mi)	Jaffna District	Jaffna Lagoon		
Kukule River				06°39′10″N 80°05′42″E	
Madu Ganga					
Mavil Aru					
Pusweli Oya					
Verugal Aru					

Malala oya - Hambanthota District karanda Oya - Potuvil Ampara District Heda Oya - Arugambay (Arunagamthota), Ampare District wil oya - Ampara District

== Gallery ==
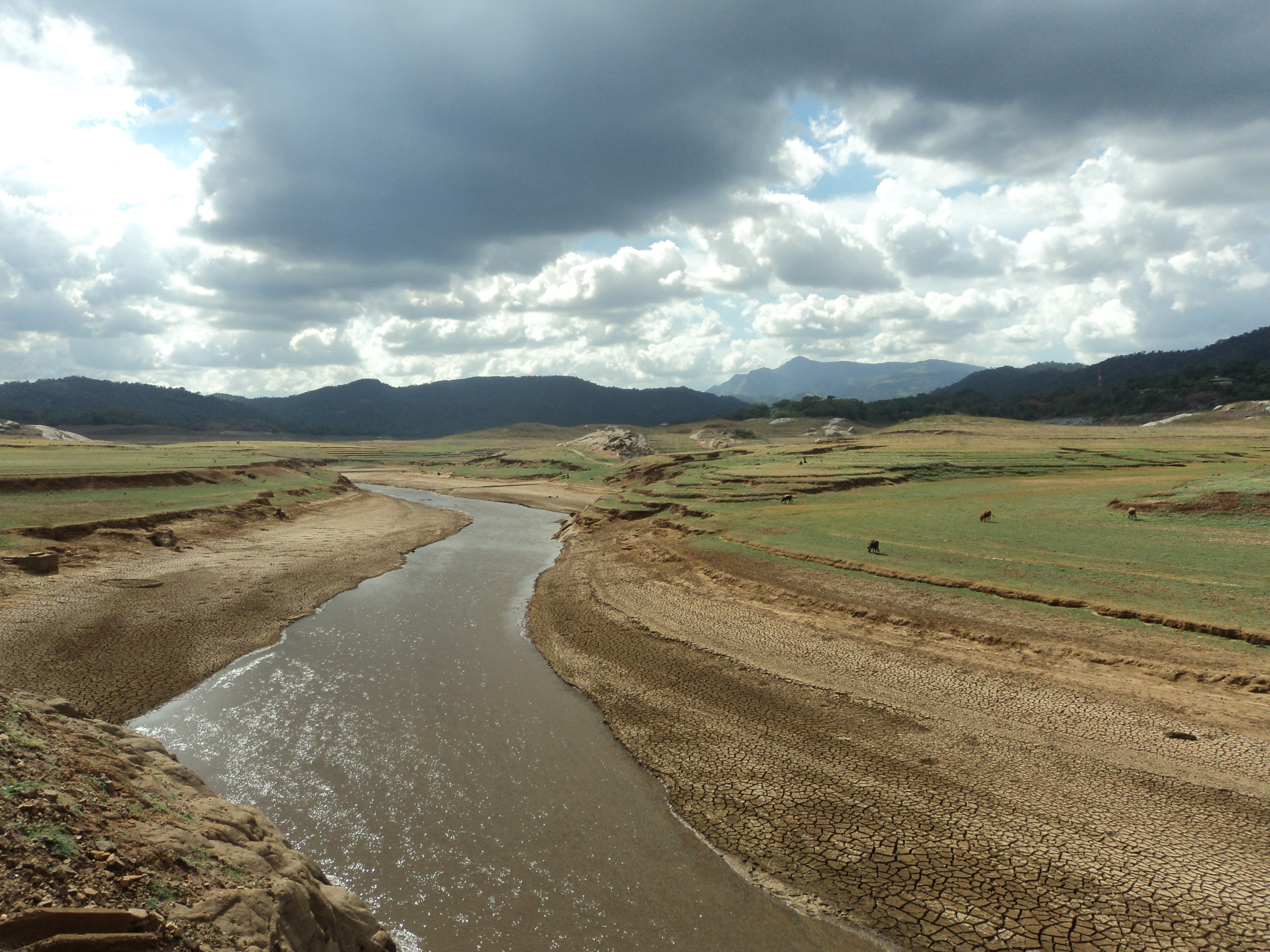
Mahaweli River, Teldeniya

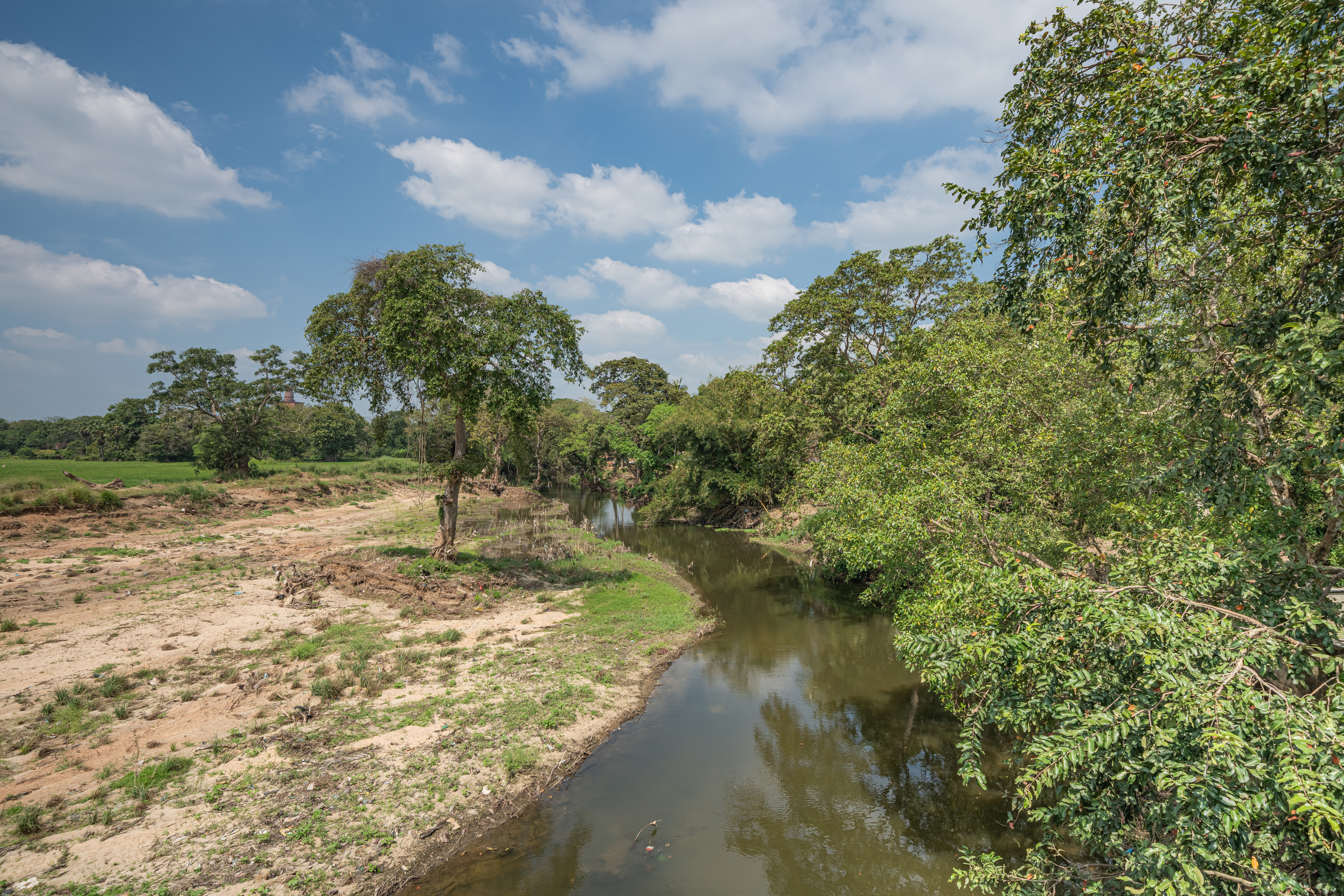
Malvathu River, Anuradhapura

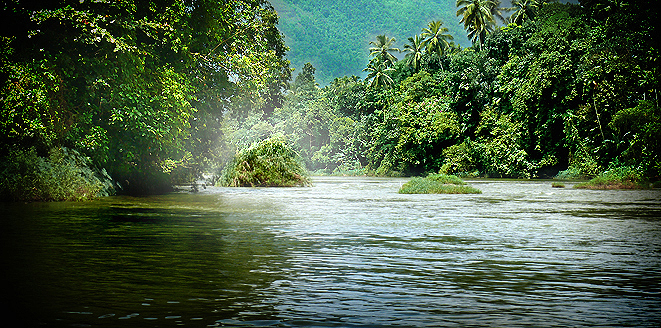
Kelani River, Kitulgala

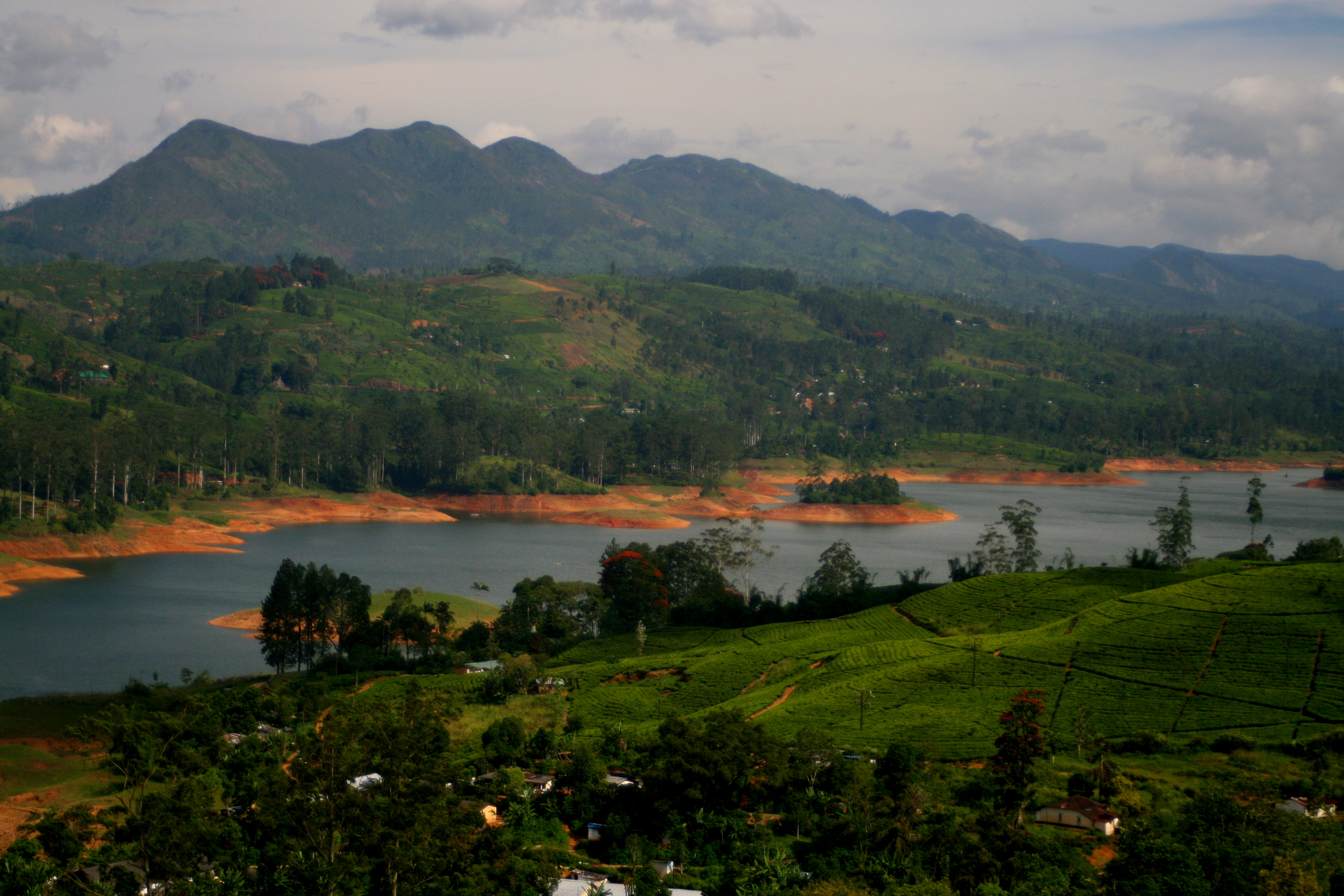
Castlereigh Reservoir on Kehelgamu Oya, a tributary of Kelani River

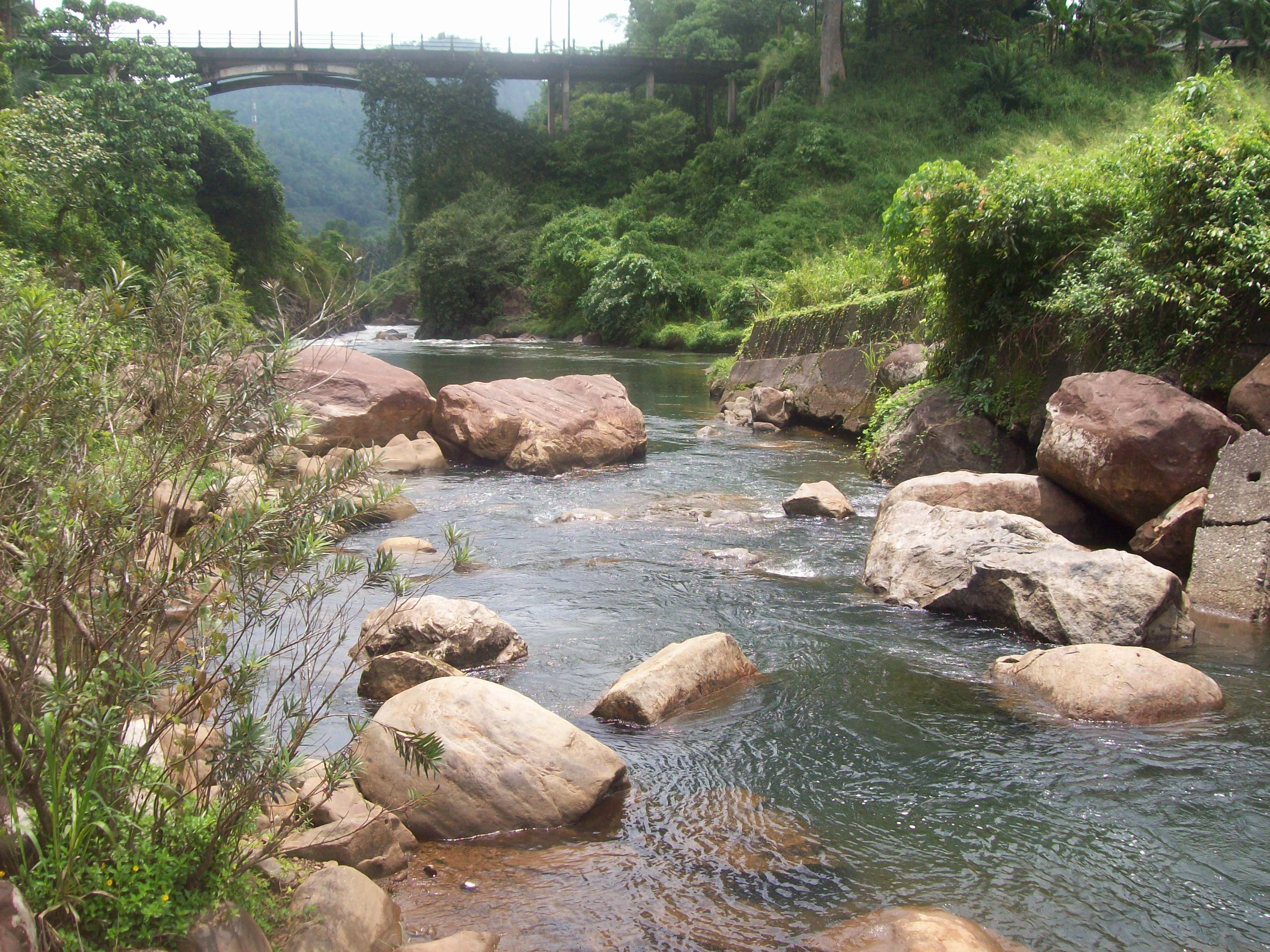
Maskeliya Oya, a tributary of Kelani River

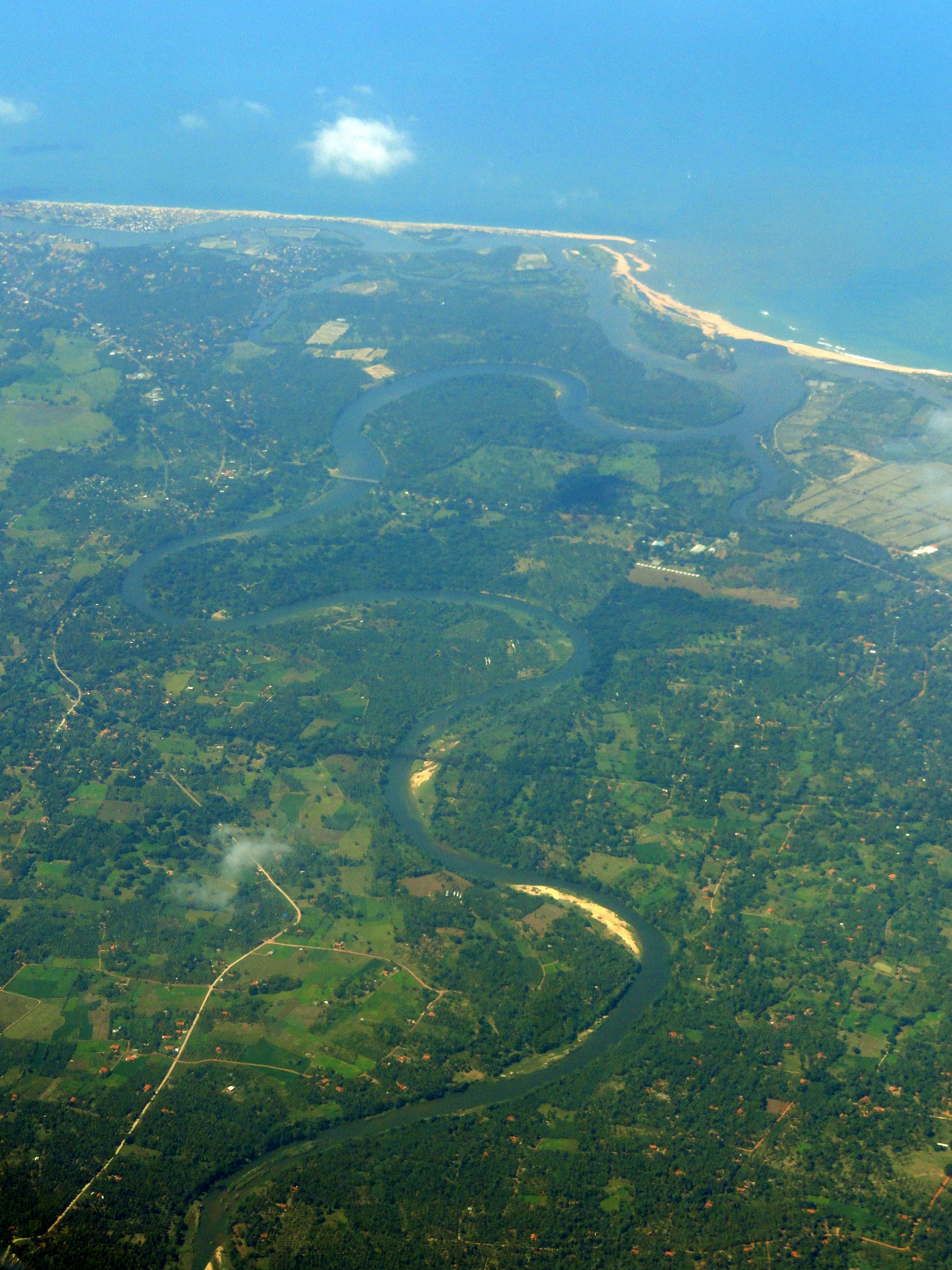
Deduru Oya, Chilaw

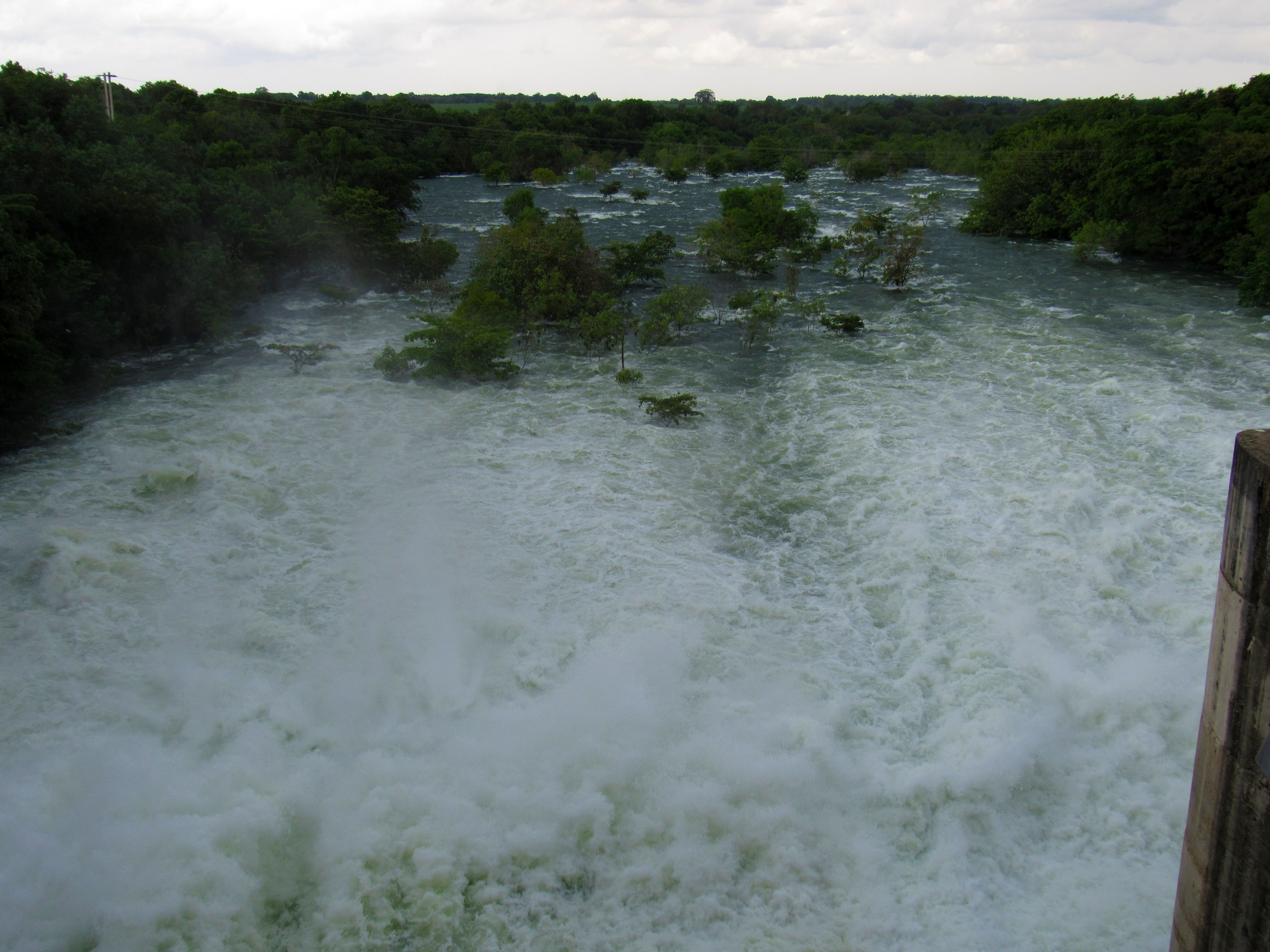
Walawe River, Udawalawe Dam

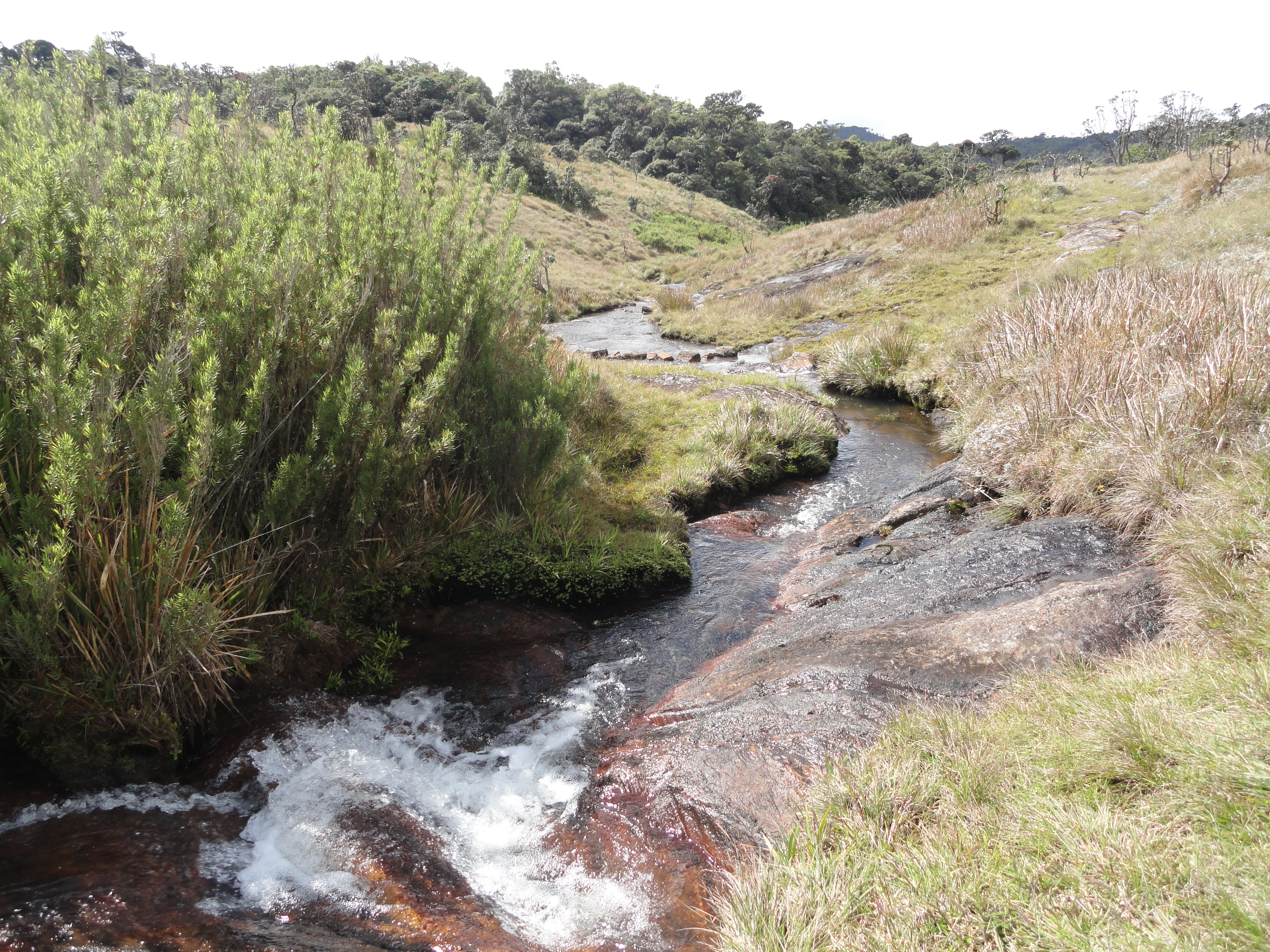
Belihul Oya, a tributary of Walawe River

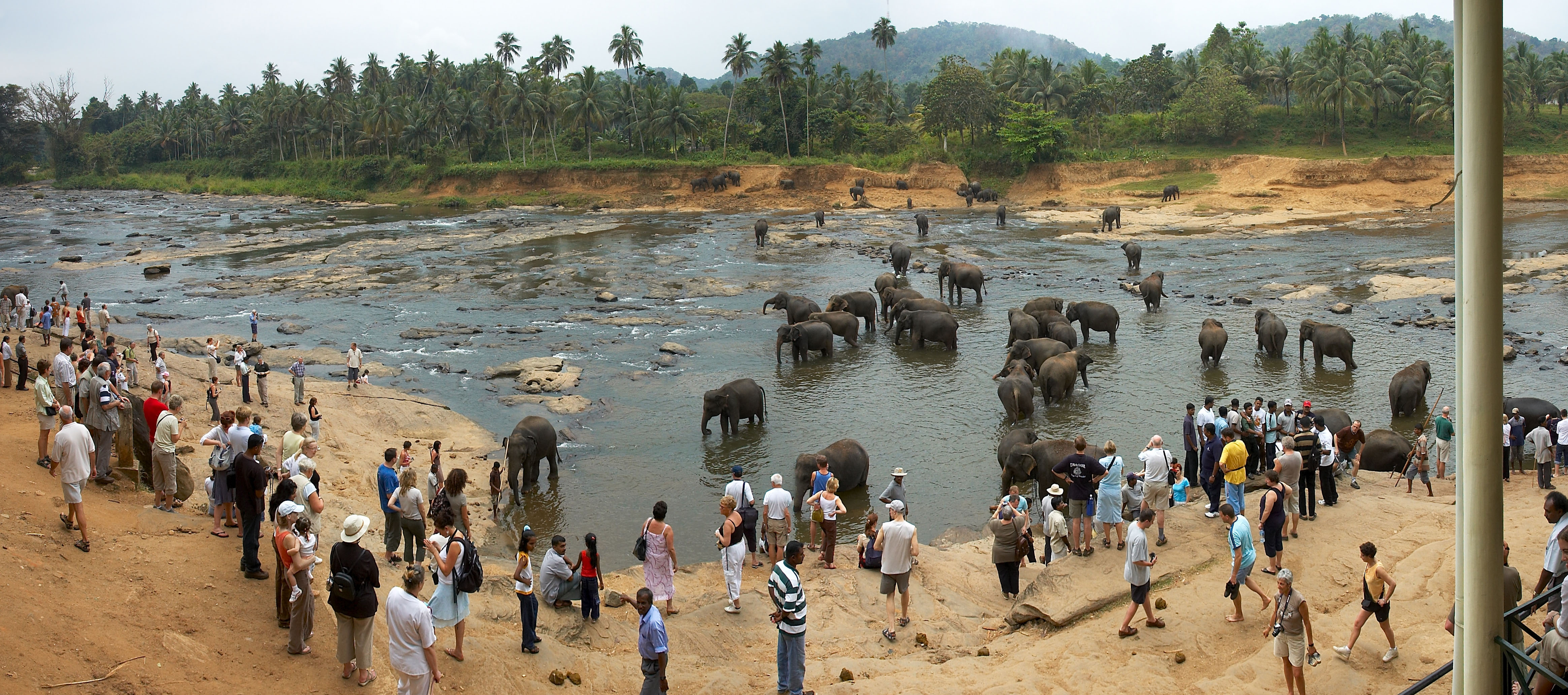
Maha Oya, Pinnawala

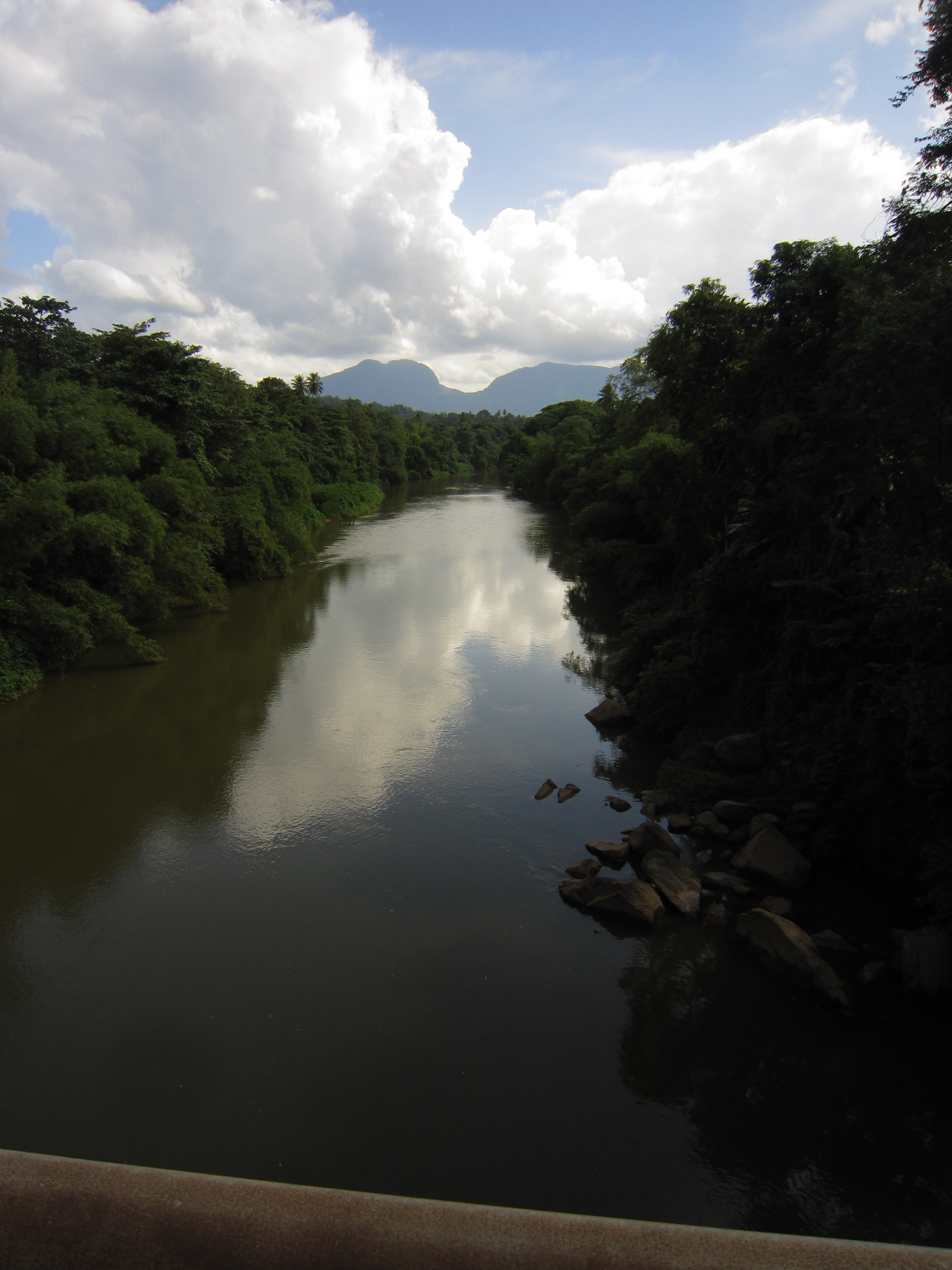
Kalu Ganga, Ratnapura

== See also ==
- List of dams and reservoirs in Sri Lanka
- List of waterfalls in Sri Lanka
