= Northern Province, Sri Lanka =

Province of Sri Lanka

Northern Province வட மாகாணம் උතුරු පළාත
- Province
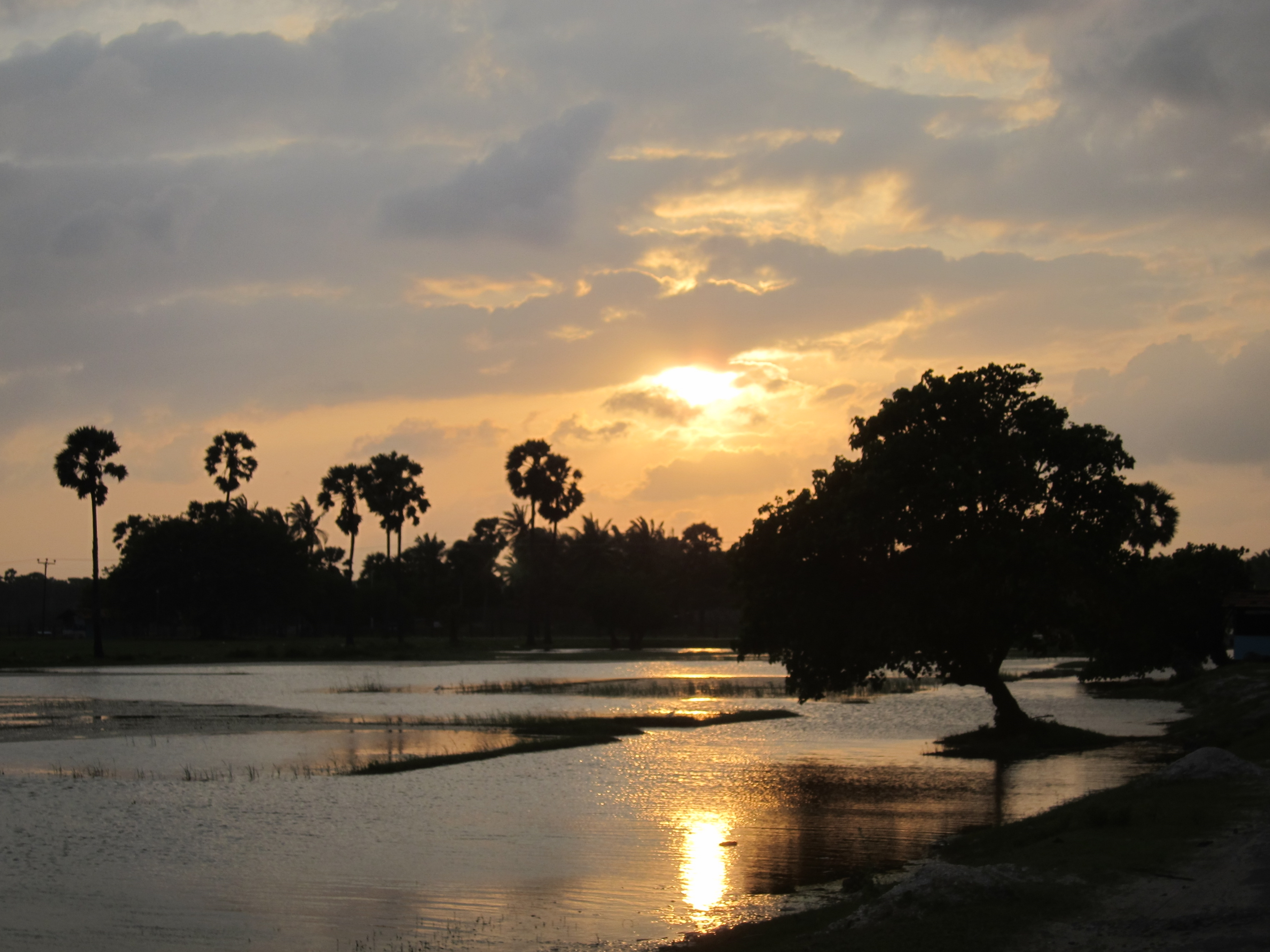
- Sunset over a lagoon

- Flag Emblem

- Location within Sri Lanka

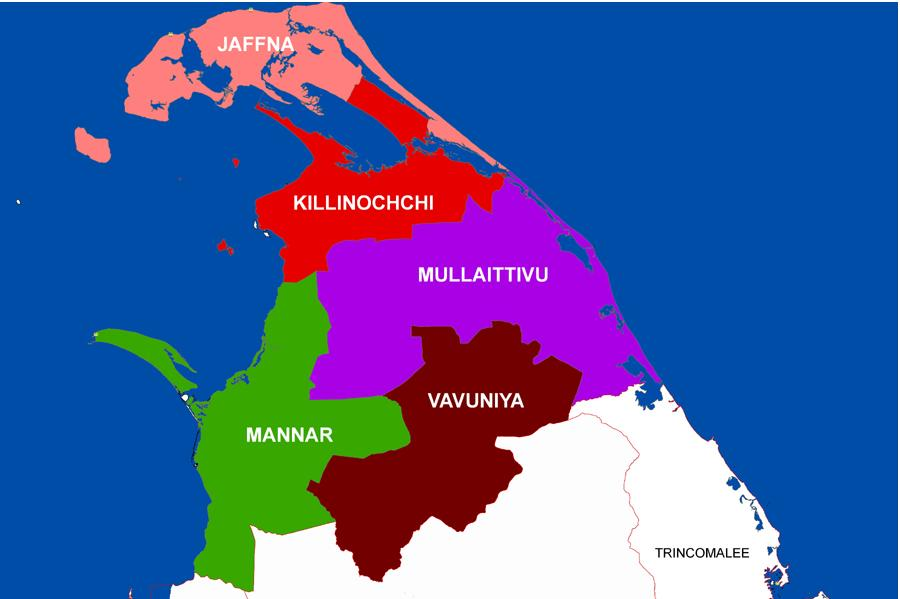
- Districts of the Northern Province
- Coordinates: 09°12′N 80°25′E
- Country: Sri Lanka
- Created: 1 October 1833
- Provincial council: 14 November 1987
- Capital: Jaffna
- Largest City: Vavuniya
- Districts: List: Jaffna; Kilinochchi; Mannar; Mullaitivu; Vavuniya

Government
  - Type: Provincial council
  - Body: Northern Provincial Council
  - Governor: Nagalingam Vedanayagam
  - MPs: List: Selvam Adaikalanathan; Silvestri Alantine; Sivasakthy Ananthan; Risad Badhiutheen; Murugesu Chandrakumar; Douglas Devananda; Hunais Farook; Muthali Bawa Farook; Vijayakala Maheswaran; Vino Noharathalingam; Suresh Premachandran; E. Saravanapavan; Mavai Senathirajah; S. Sritharan; A. Vinayagamoorthy

Area
  - Total: 8,884 km^{2} (3,430 sq mi)
  - Land: 8,290 km^{2} (3,200 sq mi)
  - Rank: 3rd (13.54% of total area)

Population (2024 census)
  - Total: 1,150,148
  - Rank: 9th (5.22% of total pop.)
  - Density: 139/km^{2} (359/sq mi)

Ethnicity (2024 census)
  - Sri Lankan Tamil: 1,052,752 (91.53%)
  - Sri Lankan Moors: 57,706 (5.02%)
  - Sinhalese: 35,542 (3.09%)
  - Indian Tamil: 3,634 (0.32%)
  - Other: 326 (0.03%)

Religion (2024 census)
  - Hindu: 829,235 (72.10%)
  - Christian: 226,824 (19.72%)
  - Muslim: 60,683 (5.28%)
  - Buddhist: 33,288 (2.87%)
  - Other: 118 (0.01%)
- Time zone: UTC+05:30 (Sri Lanka)
- Post Codes: 40000-45999
- Telephone Codes: 021, 023, 024
- ISO 3166 code: LK-4
- Vehicle registration: NP
- Official Languages: Tamil; Sinhalese
- Flower: White Lotus (Nymphaea lotus)
- Tree: Maruthu (Terminalia arjuna)
- Bird: Seven sisters (Turdoides striata)
- Animal: Male deer (axis axis)
- Website: www.np.gov.lk

The Northern Province (Tamil: வட மாகாணம் Vaṭa Mākāṇam; Sinhala: උතුරු පළාත Uturu Paḷāta) is one of the nine provinces of Sri Lanka. The province has an area of 8,884 km^{2}, making it the 3rd largest province by area, and a population of 1,150,148 making it the least populated province. Jaffna is the capital city of the province.

Between 1988 and 2006, the province was temporarily merged with the Eastern Province into one province, the North Eastern Province. Due to its large Tamil population, the Northern Province is sometimes referred to as "Sri Lanka's Tamil country". The majority of the fighting in the Sri Lankan Civil War took place in the Northern province.

== History ==
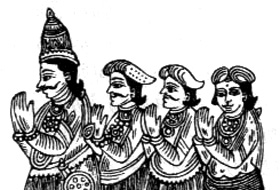
The Jaffna royal family

Parts of present-day Northern Province were part of the pre-colonial Jaffna kingdom. Other parts were ruled by Vanniar Chieftains who paid tribute to the Jaffna kingdom. The province then came under Portuguese, Dutch and British control. In 1815 the British gained control of the entire island of Ceylon. They divided the island into three ethnic based administrative structures: Low Country Sinhalese, Kandyan Sinhalese and Tamil. The Northern Province was part of the Tamil administration. In 1833, in accordance with the recommendations of the Colebrooke-Cameron Commission, the ethnic based administrative structures were unified into a single administration divided into five geographic provinces. The districts of Jaffna, Mannar, Nuvarakalaviya (present day Anuradhapura District) and Vanni formed the new Northern Province. Nuvarakalaviya was transferred to the newly created North Central Province in 1873.

The Indo-Lanka Accord signed on 29 July 1987 required the Sri Lankan government to devolve powers to the provinces and, in the interim, to merge the Northern and Eastern provinces into one administrative unit. The accord required a referendum to be held by 31 December 1988 in the Eastern Province to decide whether the merger should be permanent. Crucially, the accord allowed the Sri Lankan president to postpone the referendum at his discretion.

On 14 November 1987 the Sri Lankan Parliament passed the 13th Amendment to the 1978 Constitution of Sri Lanka and the Provincial Councils Act No 42 of 1987, establishing provincial councils. On September 2 and 8 1988 President Jayewardene issued proclamations enabling the Northern and Eastern provinces to be one administrative unit administered by one elected Council. The North Eastern Province was born.

The proclamations were only meant to be a temporary measure until a referendum was held in the Eastern Province on a permanent merger between the two provinces. However, the referendum was never held and successive Sri Lankan presidents issued proclamations annually extending the life of the "temporary" entity.

The merger was bitterly opposed by Sinhalese nationalists. The new province made up about one fourth of the total area of Sri Lanka. The thought of the rebel Liberation Tigers of Tamil Eelam controlling this province, directly or indirectly, alarmed them greatly. On 14 July 2006, after a long campaign against the merger, the Janatha Vimukthi Peramuna political party filed three separate petitions with the Supreme Court requesting a separate provincial council for the East. On 16 October 2006 the Supreme Court ruled that the proclamations issued by President Jayewardene were null and void and had no legal effect. The North Eastern Province was formally de-merged into the Northern and Eastern provinces on 1 January 2007.

Much of the Northern Province was under the control of rebel Liberation Tigers of Tamil Eelam for many years during the civil war. The province was fully recaptured by the Sri Lankan military in 2009 with the Battle of Mullaitivu.

While the Northern province has seen an era of peace after the end of the war, the scars left by the war still remain. Despite the large amount of infrastructure projects undertaken by the Mahinda Rajapaksa government, at the cost of over $3 billion, the projects have been unable to create new jobs and as a result the province suffers from extreme levels of unemployment.

In late 2014, then-incumbent President Mahinda Rajapaksa imposed a travel ban to prevent foreigners from traveling to the former war zone in the province. The ban was lifted three months later by the newly elected president Maithripala Sirisena.

== Geography ==
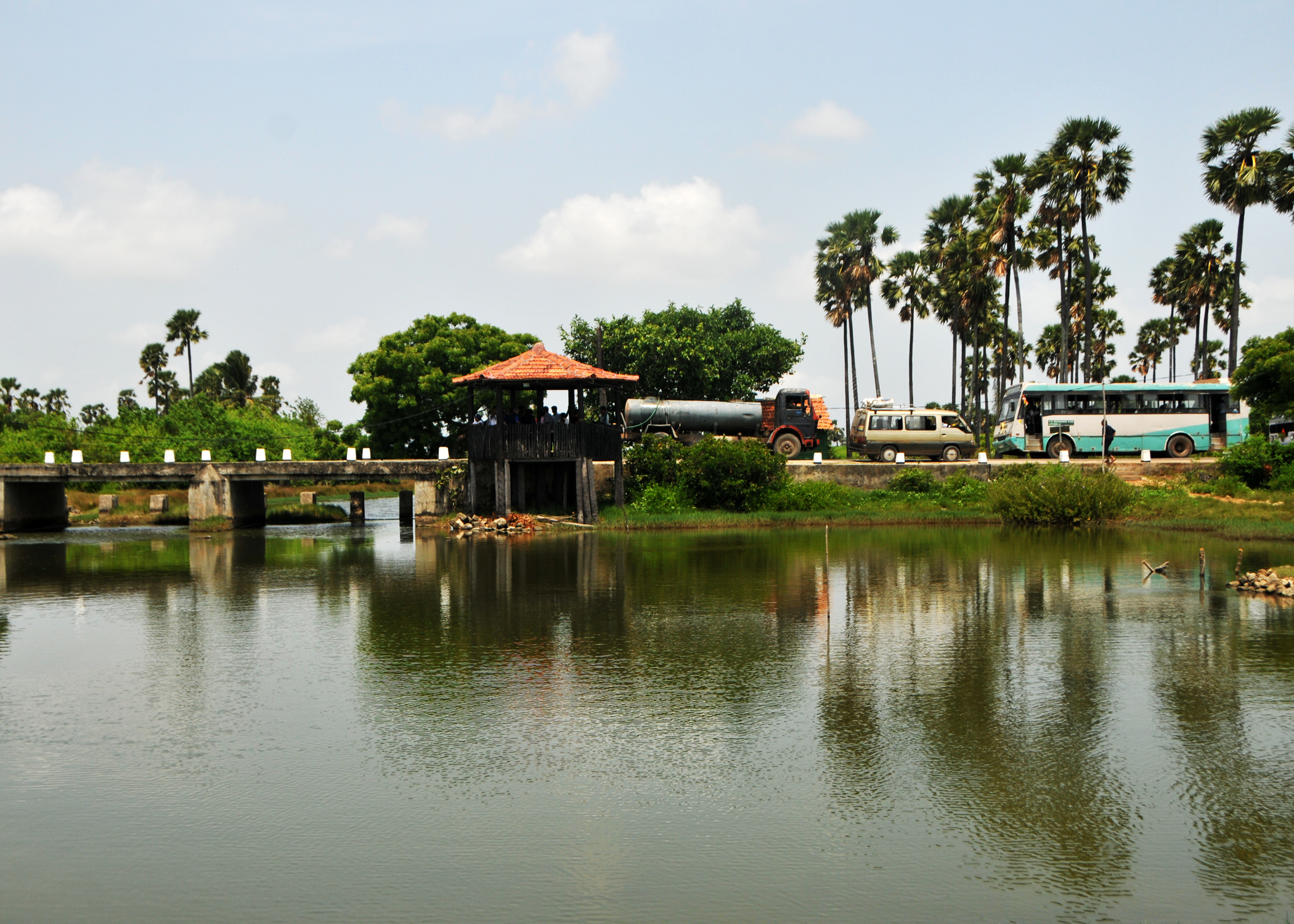
A bridge over a lagoon

Northern Province is located in the north of Sri Lanka and is just 22 miles (35 km) from India at its nearest point. It is nearly connected with the Indian mainland by Adam's Bridge (also known as Sethu Paalam or Rama's Bridge) which is a series of rocky limestone islets.

The province is surrounded by the Gulf of Mannar and Palk Bay to the west, Palk Strait to the north west, the Bay of Bengal to the north and east and the Eastern, North Central and North Western provinces to the south.

The province is divided into two distinct geographic areas: Jaffna Peninsula and the Vanni. Jaffna Peninsula is irrigated by underground aquifers fed by wells whereas the Vanni has irrigation tanks fed by perennial rivers. Major rivers include: Akkarayan Aru, Aruvi Aru, Kanakarayan Aru, Kodalikkallu Aru, Mandekal Aru, Nay Aru, Netheli Aru, Pali Aru, Pallavarayankaddu Aru, Parangi Aru, Per Aru, Piramenthal Aru, Theravil Aru.

The province has a number of lagoons, the largest being Jaffna Lagoon, Nanthi Kadal, Chundikkulam Lagoon, Vadamarachchi Lagoon, Uppu Aru Lagoon, Kokkilai lagoon, Nai Aru Lagoon and Chalai Lagoon.

Most of the islands around Sri Lanka are to be found to the west of the Northern Province. The largest islands are: Velanaitivu (Kayts), Neduntivu (Delft), Karaitivu, Pungudutivu and Mandativu.

Northern Province is covered in tropical forests, with numerous rivers flowing through them. The north-west coast is part of the deep Cauvery (Kaveri) River Basin of south-east India, which has been collecting sediments from the highlands of India and Sri Lanka since the breakup of Gondwanaland.

=== Climate and weather ===
Sri Lanka enjoys a typical tropical monsoonal climate. The Northern Province tends to be hot and dry in the dry season (February to September), and moderately cool and wet in the wet season (October to January). In the lowlands, the climate is typically tropical with the average temperature is around 28 °C to 30 °C throughout the year. January is typically the coolest month and May is the hottest month. Relative humidity varies from 70% during the day to 90% at night. The Dry Zone of the Sri Lanka is the north and east of the island, this region is affected by the north east monsoon (December to March) and southwest monsoon (June to October). It is thought to be dry because most of the rains fall during the north-east monsoon.

Annual rainfall is less than 1250 mm in the north west and south east of the Inland. It has two rainy seasons South West Monsoon- May to August, North East Monsoon- November to February.

== Administrative divisions ==
=== Districts ===
The Northern Province is divided into five districts, 34 divisional secretariats and 921 Grama Niladhari divisions.

District	Capital	District Secretary	DS Divisions	GN Divisions	Total Area (km^{2})	Land Area (km^{2})	Population	Population Density (/km^{2})
Jaffna District	Jaffna	M.Piiratheepan	15	435	1,025	929	594,751	580
Kilinochchi District	Kilinochchi	S.Muralitharan	4	95	1,279	1,205	136,710	106
Mannar District	Mannar	K.Kanakeshwaran	5	153	1,996	1,880	123,756	62
Mullaitivu District	Mullaitivu	A.Umamaheswaran	6	136	2,617	2,415	122,619	47
Vavuniya District	Vavuniya	P.A. Sarathchandra	4	102	1,967	1,861	172,312	88
Total			34	921	8,884	8,290	1,150,148	129

=== Major cities and towns ===
City/town	District	Population (2012 est)
Vavuniya	Vavuniya	99,653
Jaffna	Jaffna	88,138
Chavakacheri	Jaffna	41,407
Mannar	Mannar	35,817
Point Pedro	Jaffna	31,351
Valvettithurai	Jaffna	27,210

== Demographics ==
The population of the northern province was 1,150,148 in 2024. The majority of the population are Sri Lankan Tamil, with sizeable Sri Lankan Moor and Sinhalese minorities.

The population of the province, like that of the Eastern Province, was heavily affected by the civil war. The war killed an estimated 100,000 people. Several hundred thousand Sri Lankan Tamils, possibly as much as one million, emigrated to Western countries during the war. Many Sri Lankan Tamils also moved to the relative safety of the capital city Colombo. Most of the Sri Lankan Moors and Sinhalese who lived in the province fled to other parts of Sri Lanka, though most of them have returned to the province since the end of the civil war.

=== Ethnicity ===
Population of Northern Province by ethnic group 1881 to 2024
Year	Tamil (Note: Sri Lankan Tamil and Indian Tamil.)		Muslim (Note: Sri Lankan Moors and Indian Moors.)		Sinhalese		Other		Total No.
Year	No.	%	No.	%	No.	%	No.	%	Total No.
1881 Census	289,481	95.70%	10,416	3.44%	1,379	0.46%	1,224	0.41%	302,500
1891 Census	304,355	95.32%	11,831	3.71%	1,922	0.60%	1,188	0.37%	319,296
1901 Census	326,379	95.73%	11,862	3.48%	1,555	0.46%	1,140	0.33%	340,936
1911 Census	352,698	95.41%	12,818	3.47%	2,890	0.78%	1,245	0.34%	369,651
1921 Census	356,801	95.19%	13,095	3.49%	3,795	1.01%	1,138	0.30%	374,829
1946 Census	449,958	93.82%	18,183	3.79%	9,602	2.00%	1,829	0.38%	479,572
1963 Census	689,470	92.93%	30,760	4.15%	20,270	2.73%	1,410	0.19%	741,910
1971 Census	799,406	91.07%	37,855	4.31%	39,511	4.50%	996	0.11%	877,768
1981 Census	1,021,006	92.03%	50,991	4.60%	35,128	3.17%	2,279	0.21%	1,109,404
2000 Estimate	n/a	n/a	n/a	n/a	n/a	n/a	n/a	n/a	1,085,478
2001 Estimate (Note: 2001 Census was only carried out partially in the Northern province.)	n/a	n/a	n/a	n/a	n/a	n/a	n/a	n/a	1,111,741
2002 Estimate	n/a	n/a	n/a	n/a	n/a	n/a	n/a	n/a	1,109,182
2003 Estimate	n/a	n/a	n/a	n/a	n/a	n/a	n/a	n/a	1,118,753
2004 Estimate	n/a	n/a	n/a	n/a	n/a	n/a	n/a	n/a	1,131,854
2005 Estimate	n/a	n/a	n/a	n/a	n/a	n/a	n/a	n/a	1,206,326
2006 Estimate	n/a	n/a	n/a	n/a	n/a	n/a	n/a	n/a	1,350,961
2007 Estimate	1,277,567	97.39%	20,583	1.57%	13,626	1.04%	0	0.00%	1,311,776
2008 Estimate (Note: Excludes Maritimepattu, Puthukudiyiruppu and Thunukkai divisions - no data available.)	1,022,431	96.90%	19,184	1.82%	13,492	1.28%	50	0.00%	1,055,157
2009 Estimate (Note: Excludes Maritimepattu and Puthukudiyiruppu divisions - no data available.)	943,312	95.68%	26,304	2.67%	16,240	1.65%	0	0.00%	985,856
2011 Enumeration	942,824	94.49%	32,659	3.27%	21,860	2.19%	411	0.04%	997,754
2012 Census	993,741	93.86%	32,364	3.06%	32,331	3.05%	326	0.03%	1,058,762
2024 Census	1,056,386	91.85%	57,706	5.02%	35,542	3.09%	514	0.04%	1,150,148

=== Religion ===
Population of Northern Province by religion 1981 to 2024
Year	Hindu		Christian (Note: Roman Catholic and Other Christian.)		Muslim		Buddhist		Other		Total No.
Year	No.	%	No.	%	No.	%	No.	%	No.	%	Total No.
1981 Census	860,281	77.54%	169,004	14.19%	54,534	4.92%	25,281	2.28%	304	0.03%	1,109,404
2011 Enumeration	755,066	75.68%	187,663	18.81%	33,185	3.33%	20,451	2.05%	1,389	0.14%	997,754
2012 Census	789,362	74.56%	204,005	19.27%	34,040	3.22%	30,387	2.87%	968	0.09%	1,058,762
2024 Census	829,235	72.10%	226,824	19.72%	60,683	5.28%	33,288	2.89%	118	0.01%	1,150,148

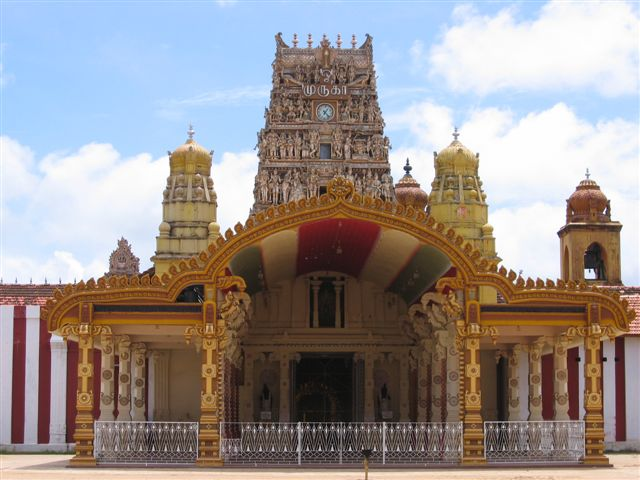
Nallur Kandaswamy temple

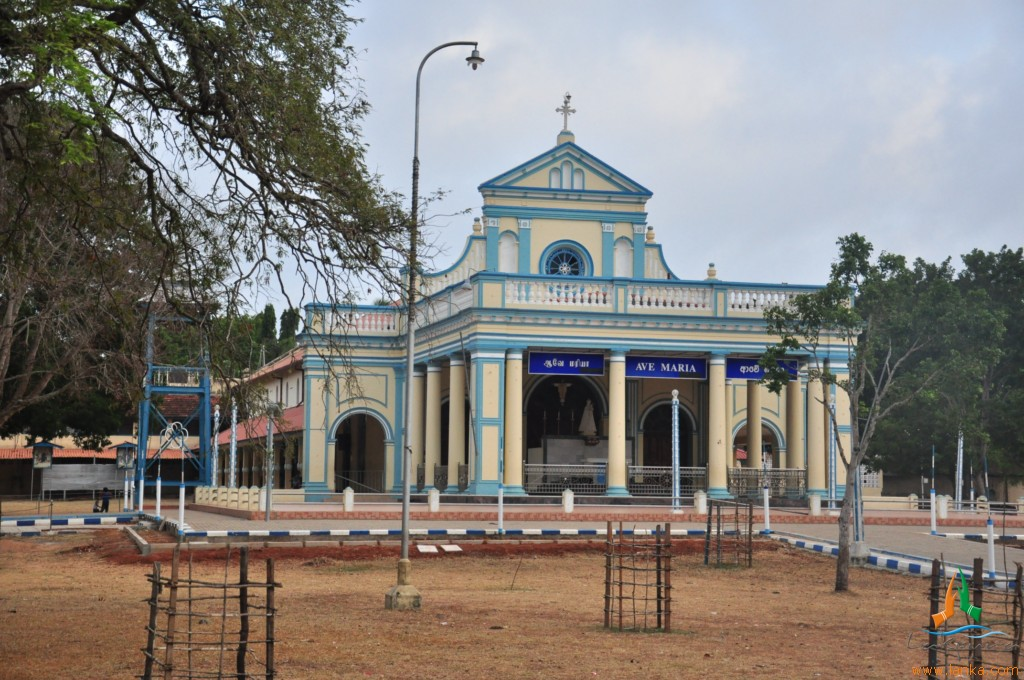
Shrine of Our Lady of Madhu

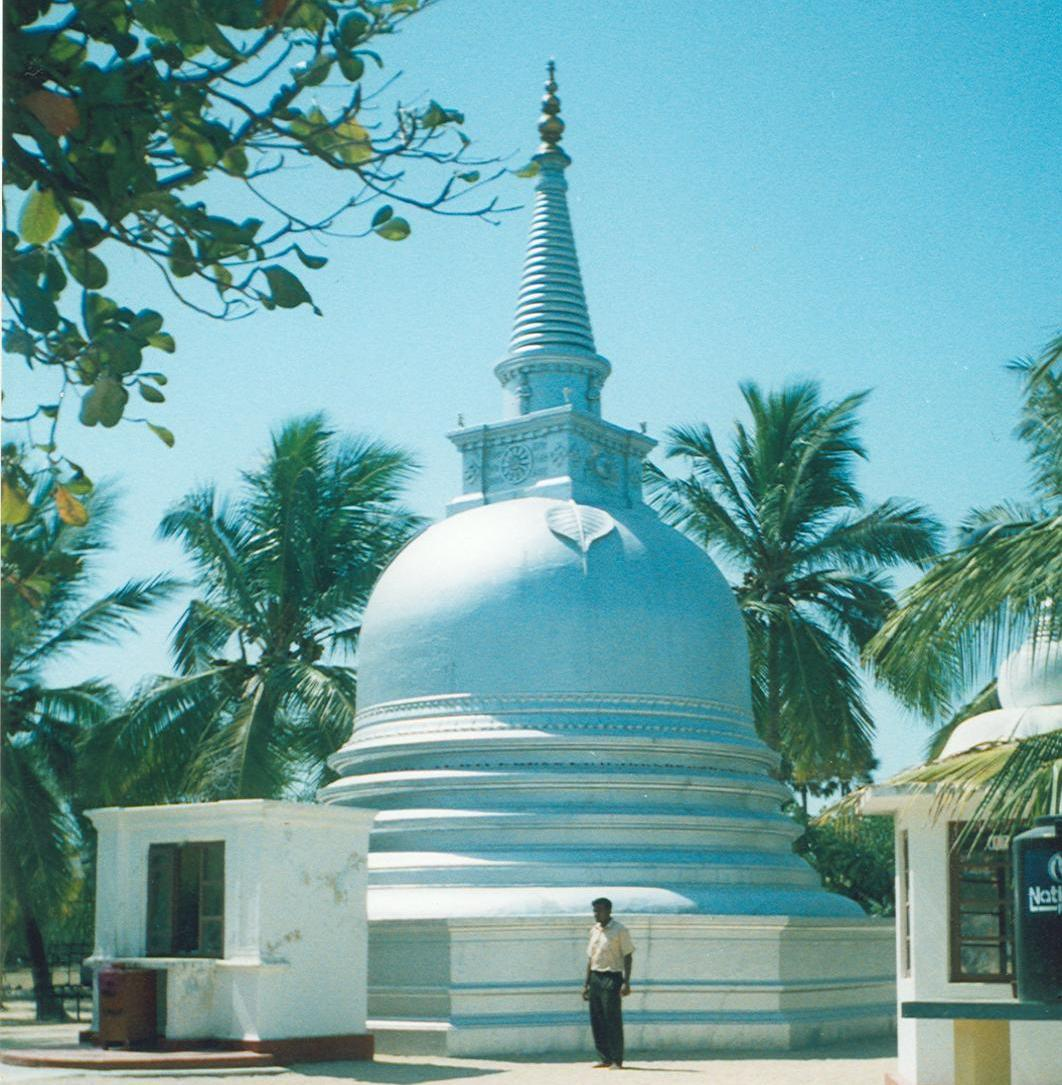
The Nagadeepa Purana Viharaya, one of the 16 Solosmasthana

== Governance and politics ==
=== Sri Lankan Parliament ===
First elected representation at provincial level to a legislative came about after the Second Manning Reforms of the Legislative Council of Ceylon which assigned a seat to the Northern Province. With universal adult suffrage been enabled through the Donoughmore Constitution, representatives from the province were elected to parliament. Currently Two Electoral Districts, namely Jaffna Electoral District and Vanni Electoral District which elects 15 of the 225 members of the Sri Lankan Parliament.

=== Provincial council ===
Until 1978, the administration of the provinces in Sri Lanka where mainly carried out by the Government Agents of the districts. Through the 13th Amendment to the 1978 Constitution of Sri Lanka and the Provincial Councils Act, No. 42 of 1987, Provincial council were established in the Provinces.

The 13th Amendment to the 1978 Constitution of Sri Lanka established provincial councils. The first elections for provincial councils took place on 28 April 1988 in North Central, North Western, Sabaragamuwa, and Uva provinces.

Elections in the newly merged North-East Province were scheduled for 19 November 1988. However, the Indian Peace Keeping Force (IPKF), which at that time occupied the North-East Province, rigged the elections in the north so that the Eelam People's Revolutionary Liberation Front (EPRLF) and Eelam National Democratic Liberation Front (ENDLF), two Indian backed paramilitary groups, won all of the 36 seats in the north uncontested. However, elections did take place for the 35 seats in the east. The Sri Lanka Muslim Congress won 17 seats, EPRLF 12 seats, ENDLF 5 seats and the United National Party 1 seat. On 10 December 1988 Annamalai Varatharajah Perumal of the EPRLF became the first Chief Minister of the North-East Provincial Council.

On 1 March 1990, just as the IPKF were preparing to withdraw from Sri Lanka, Permual moved a motion in the North-East Provincial Council declaring an independent Eelam.

Since the early 1990s parts of the north-east provinces were controlled by the LTTE, which according to the Sri Lankan government owned Sunday Observer newspaper, prevented elections. The north-east was governed directly from Colombo until May 2008 when elections were held in the demerged the Eastern Province which was followed by elections in the Northern Province in September 2013.

Following the end of the civil war, G.A. Chandrasiri was sworn in as the Governor of Northern Province with effect 12 July 2009 and C. V. Vigneswaran was appointed Chief Minister of the Northern Province following the provincial council elections 2013.

Major political parties in the province are Tamil National Alliance led by Illankai Tamil Arasu Kachchi, DTNA, United National Party, Sri Lanka Freedom Party and EPDP.

== Economy ==
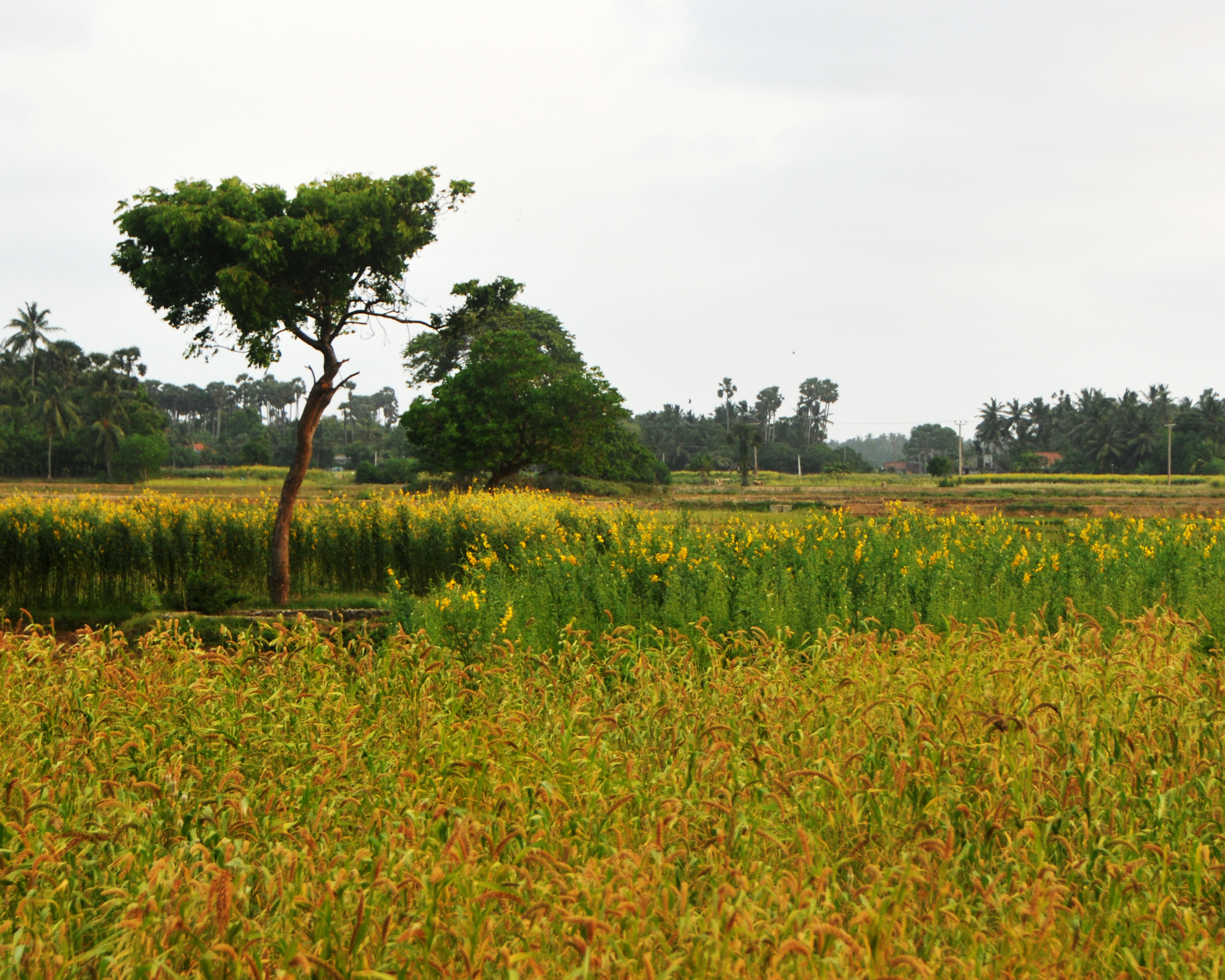
Farm land in Kandarodai

The majority of the people earn their livelihood as farmers, fishers, and professionals in the civil and business sectors. Before the civil war cement and chemical industries along with fishing made a major contribution to the economy. With the destruction and closure of these industries during the civil war, unemployment has increased. The population that fled the fighting provides foreign remittances to their relatives in the province. However, with the election victory of President Maithripala Sirisena and the removal of restrictions that prevented foreigners from visiting the north contributed to the sense of economic renewal alongside the development of Kankesanthurai Harbor the renovated Jaffna International Airport at Palaly. Investments have also started to flow into an industries such chemical and cement factories, hotels, apparel factories, power plants and aquaculture farms. As of 2018 the apparel industry of the province employed 7,917 staff and represented an investment of US$65 million with factories in Vavuniya, Killinochchi, Mannar and Mullaitivu.

The Northern Province's contribution the gross domestic product is the lowest among the nine provinces representing only 3.5% of the overall GDP in 2015 however the provincial gross domestic product nominal growth rate was 12.1% in 2015 and is the fastest growing province alongside the North Central Province.

Northern Province being an agricultural dominant province, where agricultural sector is 25.9% and trade sector comes next to it is 19.3%. Most workers however are engaged in the service sector covering 31.2% of the total.

Gross State Domestic Product in Rs. Crores and Current Prices

Year	GSDP	Change	Share of Sri Lanka
2001	29,490	▲ %	▲2.37%
2002	37,400	▲ %	▲2.67%
2003	43,123	▲ %	▲2.76%
2004	52,988	▲ %	▲2.94%
2005	64,004	▲ %	▲3.05%
2006	72,722	▲ %	▼2.93%

== Transport ==
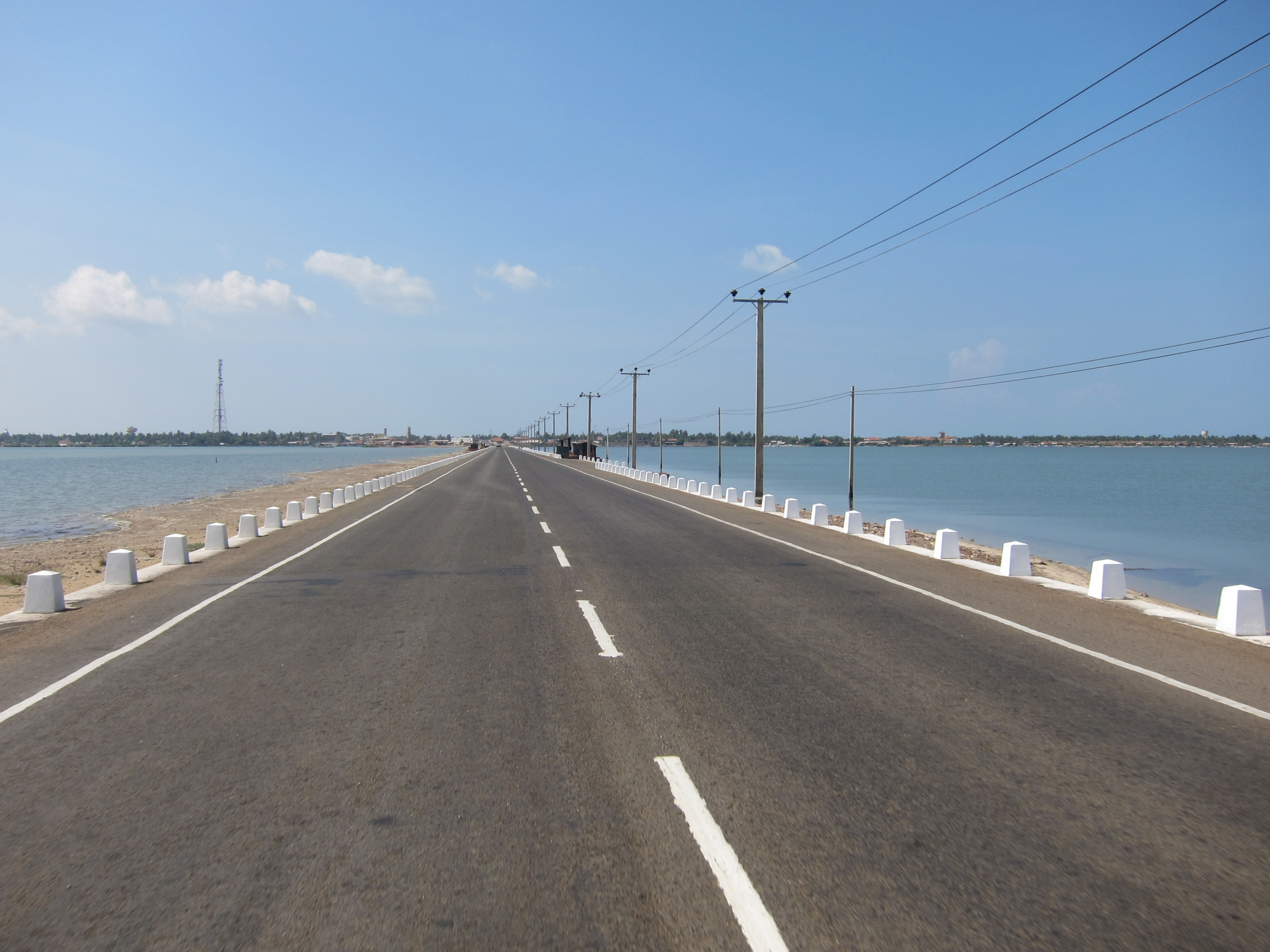
Causeway linking Mannar Island with the mainland

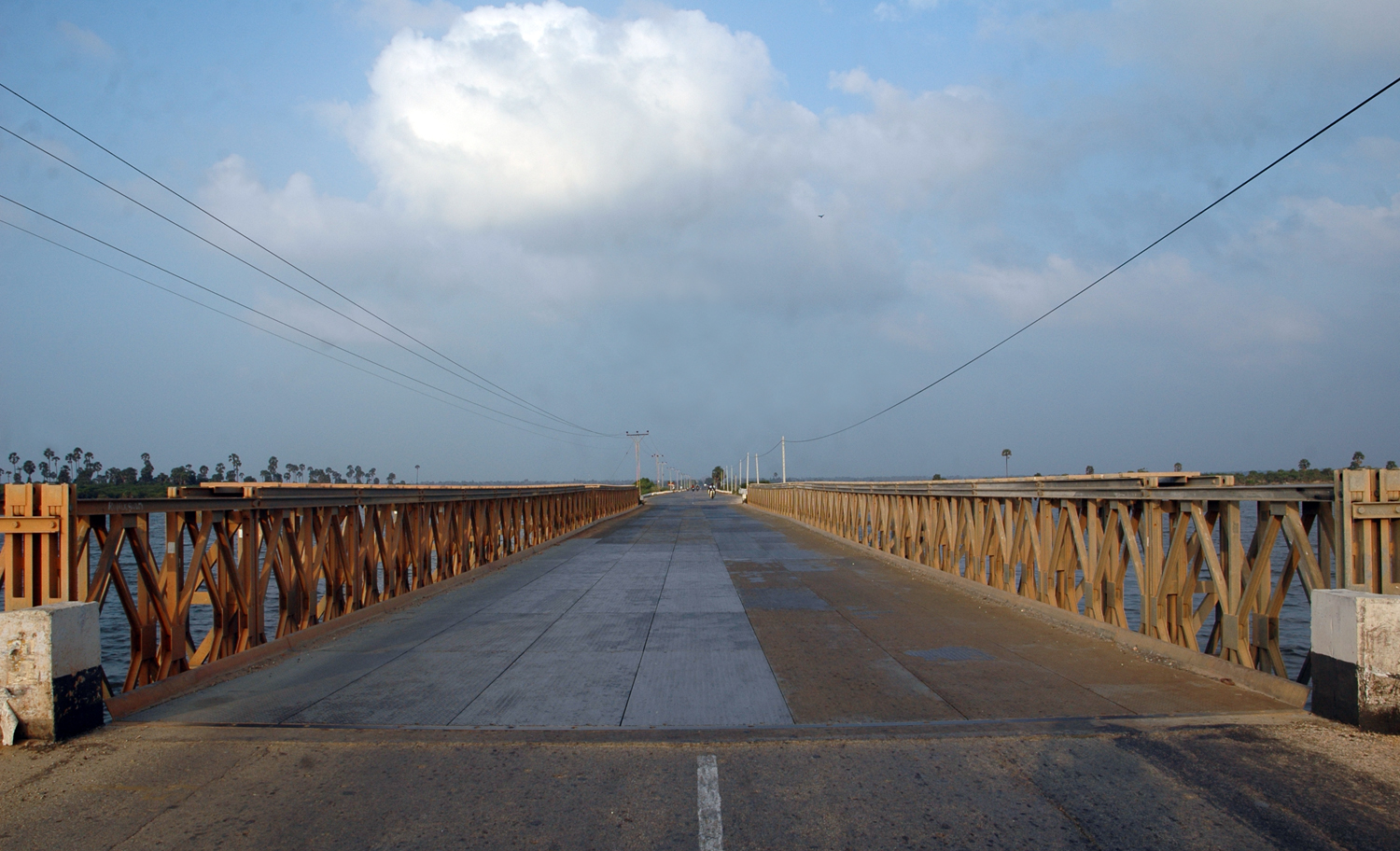
Vallai bridge

Transport infrastructure in the province is poorly developed and limits economic activity.

=== Road ===
Major roads in the province are divided into two categories:

- A Class roads or National Highways - Maintained and controlled by Central Government.
- B Class roads or Provincial Highways - Maintained and controlled by Provincial Government.

There are number of underdeveloped C and D Class roads in the province.

=== Rail ===
Sri Lanka Railways operates the country's railway network, including the Northern Line and the Mannar Line, in the Northern Province.

Most of the railways were developed during the British colonial period.

The railway lines between Vavuniya, Jaffna, and Kankesanthurai and between Medawachchiya and Talaimannar were destroyed during the civil war. For a time during reconstruction the Northern Line operated south of Pallai, while the Mannar Line operates between Medawachchiya and Madhu Road, but by 2015 it was reconstructed past Jaffna to its terminus at Kankesanthirai. Both lines are under reconstruction to restore the original network and upgrade the operating technology used.

=== Air ===
Airways and airports are underdeveloped in this province. Jaffna International Airport is the primary airport in the province, once an international airport that had regular passenger flight service to Colombo and Tiruchirappalli, India. It had been under the control of the Sri Lanka Navy and now has been turned into an international airport again with the help of India. Daily flights between Chennai, India and Jaffna are available, as well as flights to Tiruchirappalli. There are a few small airports and airstrips in Vavuniya and Iranamadu.

== Education ==
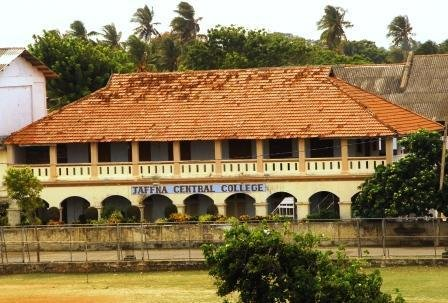
Founded in 1817 Jaffna Central College is one of the oldest schools in the Northern Province

The Northern Province has one university, the University of Jaffna which became independent in 1979, previously having been a campus of the University of Sri Lanka since 1974. The university has approximately 7,000 students. The province is known for its institutions of education, many of which were established by Christian missionaries.

Total Schools of Northern Province (1981) and (2006)
Districts	No. of Schools (1981)	No. of Schools (2006)
Jaffna	488	410
Kilinochchi	85	96
Mannar	105	95
Vavuniya	183	188
Mullaitivu	100	103

== Media ==
The first newspaper in Jaffna, Uthayatharakai (Morning Star) was published in 1841 by C.W. Thamotharampillai Other daily newspapers included Eelakesari and Virakesari which began in 1930 and Thinakaran in 1932. Journals committed to the growth of modernistic, socially purposive literature like Bharati and Marumalarchi were started in 1946.

What few newspapers are published in the province now are in Tamil, none are in English or Sinhala. Before the Civil war, dozens of newspapers and magazines were published. Press freedom was limited and censored by the Government and Pro-government paramilitaries. Now most of the Tamil, English, Sinhala magazines come from Colombo and Chennai, India.

== See also ==
- List of settlements in Northern Province (Sri Lanka)
- Provinces of Sri Lanka
- Districts of Sri Lanka

== Bibliography ==
- Peninsular Jaffna from ancient to medieval times, Its significant historical and settlement aspects, Fernando, A. D. N., Journal of the Royal Asiatic Society, 1987
- Ancient Jaffna, Being a research into the History of Jaffna from Very Early Times to the Portuguese Period, Rasanayagam, Mudaliyar C., Asian Educational Services (AES), New Delhi, 1984
- The laws and customs of the Tamils of Jaffna, Tambiah, H. W., Women's Education and Research Centre, Colombo, 2004
- the Essential guide for Jaffna and its region, Fabry, Philippe; Lisa Fabry-Bewley, Alexandra Fabry & Emmanuel Fabry, Viator Publications (Pvt) Ltd, Negombo, 2003
- Notes on Jaffna, Chronological, historical, biographical, Martyn, John H., Asian Educational Services (AES), New Delhi, 2003
- Jaffna and Colombo, A century of relationships in three plays, Ludowyk, E. F. C. & Ernest MaCintyre, Vijitha Yapa Publications, Colombo, 2006
