= Muthuiyankaddu Kulam =

- முத்துஐயன்கட்டு குளம் (Tamil)
- Location within Northern Province
- Location: Northern Province
- Coordinates: 09°12′07″N 80°36′31″E
- Type: Artificial lake
- River sources: Per Aru
- Catchment area: 66 sq mi (171 km^{2})
- Managing agency: Department of Irrigation, Northern Provincial Council
- Water volume: 41,000 acre⋅ft (50,572,755 m^{3})

Muthuiyankaddu Kulam (Tamil: முத்துஐயன்கட்டு குளம் Muttu'aiyaṉkaṭṭu Kuḷam) is an irrigation tank in northern Sri Lanka, approximately 4 mi (6 km) north west of Oddusuddan.

== History ==
The tank on Per Aru was earlier knowns as Muthu Rayan Kaddu Kulam and Man Malai. Restoration of the tank, which had a catchment area of 66 sq mi (171 km^{2}), commenced in 1959.

By the late 1960s the tank's bund was 5,850 ft (1,783 m) long and 27 ft (8 m) high whilst the tank's storage capacity was 41,000 acre⋅ft (50,572,755 m^{3}) and its water spread area was 3,100 acres (1,255 ha). There was a 500 ft (152 m) spill on the right bank. The left and right bank sluices were each 3 ft 3 in by 4 ft 6 in. By 2014 the tank was capable of irrigating 6,100 acres (2,469 ha).
