= S. Arumugam =

S. Arumugam FICE FIE
- Born: 31 August 1905; Nallur, Ceylon
- Died: 6 March 2000 (aged 94)
- Education: St. John's College, Jaffna; S. Thomas' College, Mount Lavinia; Ceylon University College; King's College, London
- Occupation: Engineer

Sanmugam Arumugam (31 August 1905 – 6 March 2000) was a Ceylon Tamil irrigation engineer and writer.

== Early life and family ==
Arumugam was born on 31 August 1905 in Nallur in northern Ceylon. He was the son of Vairavanther Sanmugam. He was educated at St. John's College, Jaffna from where he passed the Cambridge Junior Examinations in 1921. In 1922 he joined S. Thomas' College, Mount Lavinia from where he passed the Cambridge Senior Examinations with honours in 1923.

After school Arumugam joined the Ceylon University College in 1923, graduating in 1927 with a General Bachelor of Science degree. He then went to study civil engineering at King's College, London, graduating in 1930.

Arumugam was married and had three sons (Thiru, Sri and Sakthi) and four daughters (Sushila, Vimala, Praemala and Ahila).

== Career ==
After university Arumugam worked for the Manchester Corporation Waterworks as an engineer at Haweswater Reservoir. He lived in Butterwick. He returned to Ceylon in 1932 and started working as an engineer for the Irrigation Department. For over 20 years he worked at various places in Ceylon.

In 1948, when Arumugam was Divisional Irrigation Engineer based in Vavuniya, he built a dam at Palavi, providing a water tank for Thiruketheeswaram temple. He was actively involved in the restoration of the temple. Arumugam carried out various investigations at the Nilavarai "bottomless" well near Puttur the results of which enabled a Hercules Windmill pump to be built at Urellu Pokkunai well in 1952, providing irrigation water for the surrounding fields at minimal cost. Arumugam also developed the River for Jaffna project (known as the Arumugam plan), which involved diverting the freshwater discharged by the Kanakarayan Aru into the heart of the Jaffna Peninsula via the Vadamarachchi Lagoon. Whilst parts of the projects were completed in the 1950s and 1960s, the crucial Mulliyan channel linking Chundikkulam Lagoon with Vadamarachchi Lagoon was never built and therefore the project was never completed.

Arumugam was Deputy Director of Irrigation for ten years and acted as Director of Irrigation. He retired from the Irrigation Department in 1965. However, he continued to be Chief Engineer and Director of the Water Resources Board until 1972. He was president of the Institution of Engineers Ceylon in 1966–67 and president of the engineering section of the Ceylon Association for the Advancement of Science.

Arumugam spent his retirement researching and writing books on Tamil culture and Hindu civilisation in Sri Lanka. He moved the United Kingdom and died on 6 March 2000.

== Works ==
Arumugam wrote several books and technical papers during his life:

- Development of Village Irrigation Works (1957)
- Maintenance of Major Irrigation Works
- Ground Water in the Jaffna Peninsula
- Development of Water Resources of Ceylon (1969)
- Some Ancient Hindu Temples of Sri Lanka (1980)
- Lord of Thiruketheeswaram (1981)
- Stone Sculptures in Colombo Hindu Temple (1990)
- Thiru Koneswaram (1990)
- Lombok and its Temples (1991)
- More Hindu Temples of Sri Lanka
- Dictionary of Biography of the Tamils of Ceylon (1997)
- Hundred Hindu Temples of Sri Lanka: Ancient, Medieval and Modern (2014) ISBN 978-0957502345
- Thiruketheeswaram: One of the Pancha-Iswarams of Ancient Sri Lanka (2020) ISBN 979-8695669268
