= Nay Aru (Mannar) =

Coordinates: 9.0000°N 80.1667°E

Location
- Country: Sri Lanka
- Province: Northern Province
- Districts: Vavuniya, Mannar

Physical characteristics
- Source
  - location: Vavuniya District
- Mouth: Palk Bay
  - location: Mannar District
- Length: 40 km (25 mi)
- Basin size: 560 km^{2} (220 mi^{2})

The Nay Aru (or Nai Aru) is a river in Northern Province, Sri Lanka. The river rises in south-west Vavuniya District, before flowing north/north-west through Vavuniya District and Mannar District. The river empties into Palk Bay.

== See also ==
- List of rivers in Sri Lanka
