= Nay Aru =

Nay Aru (or Nai Aru) is the name of two rivers in Northern Province, Sri Lanka:

- Nay Aru (Mannar), in Mannar District and Vavuniya District
- Nay Aru (Mullaitivu), in Mullaitivu District
