= Akkarayan Aru =

Coordinates: 09°26′N 80°18′E

- Location of mouth

Location
- Country: Sri Lanka
- Province: Northern Province
- Districts: Mullaitivu, Kilinochchi

Physical characteristics
- Source
  - location: Mullaitivu District
- Mouth: Jaffna Lagoon
- Length: 25 km (16 mi)
- Basin size: 192 km^{2} (74 mi^{2})

The Akkarayan Aru is a river in Northern Province, Sri Lanka. The river rises in north-west Mullaitivu District. It flows north through Mullaitivu and Kilinochchi districts before emptying into Jaffna Lagoon.

== See also ==
- List of rivers in Sri Lanka
