= Piramenthal Aru =

Coordinates: 9°27′N 80°36′E

Location
- Country: Sri Lanka
- Province: Northern Province
- Districts: Mullaitivu, Kilinochchi

Physical characteristics
- Source
  - location: Mullaitivu District
- Mouth: Chundikkulam Lagoon
  - location: Kilinochchi District
- Length: 20 km (12 mi)
- Basin size: 82 km^{2} (32 mi^{2})

The Piramenthal is a small river in Northern Province, Sri Lanka. The river rises in northern Mullaitivu District, and flow north through the Mullaitivu and Kilinochchi districts. The river empties into Chundikkulam Lagoon.

== See also ==
- List of rivers in Sri Lanka
