= Kodalikkallu Aru =

Location
- Country: Sri Lanka
- Province: Northern Province
- District: Mullaitivu District

Physical characteristics
- Source
  - location: Mullaitivu District
- Mouth: Nanthi Lagoon
  - location: Mullaitivu District
- Length: 19 km (12 mi)
- Basin size: 74 km^{2} (29 sq mi)

The Kodalikkallu Aru is a small river in Northern Province, Sri Lanka. The river rises in south-east Mullaitivu District, and flows in north/north-east through Mullaitivu district. The river empties into Nanthi Kadal lagoon.

== See also ==
- List of rivers of Sri Lanka
