= Parangi Aru =

Coordinates: 09°06′N 80°04′E

- Location within Sri Lanka

Location
- Country: Sri Lanka
- Province: Northern Province
- Districts: Vavuniya, Mannar, Mullaitivu

Physical characteristics
- Source
  - location: Vavuniya District
- Mouth: Palk Bay
  - location: Mannar District
- Length: 60 km (37 mi)
- Basin size: 832 km^{2} (321 mi^{2})

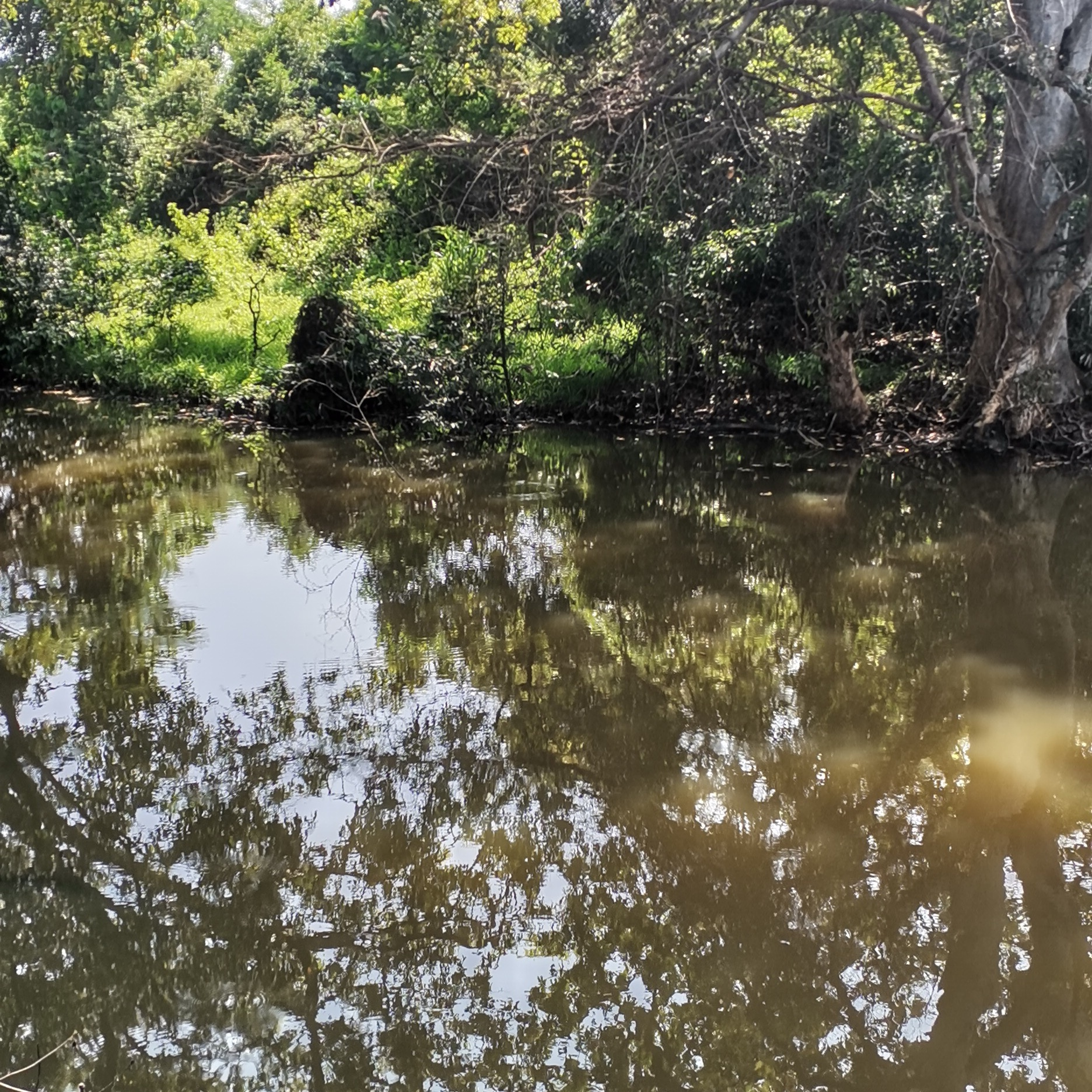
Parangi Aru

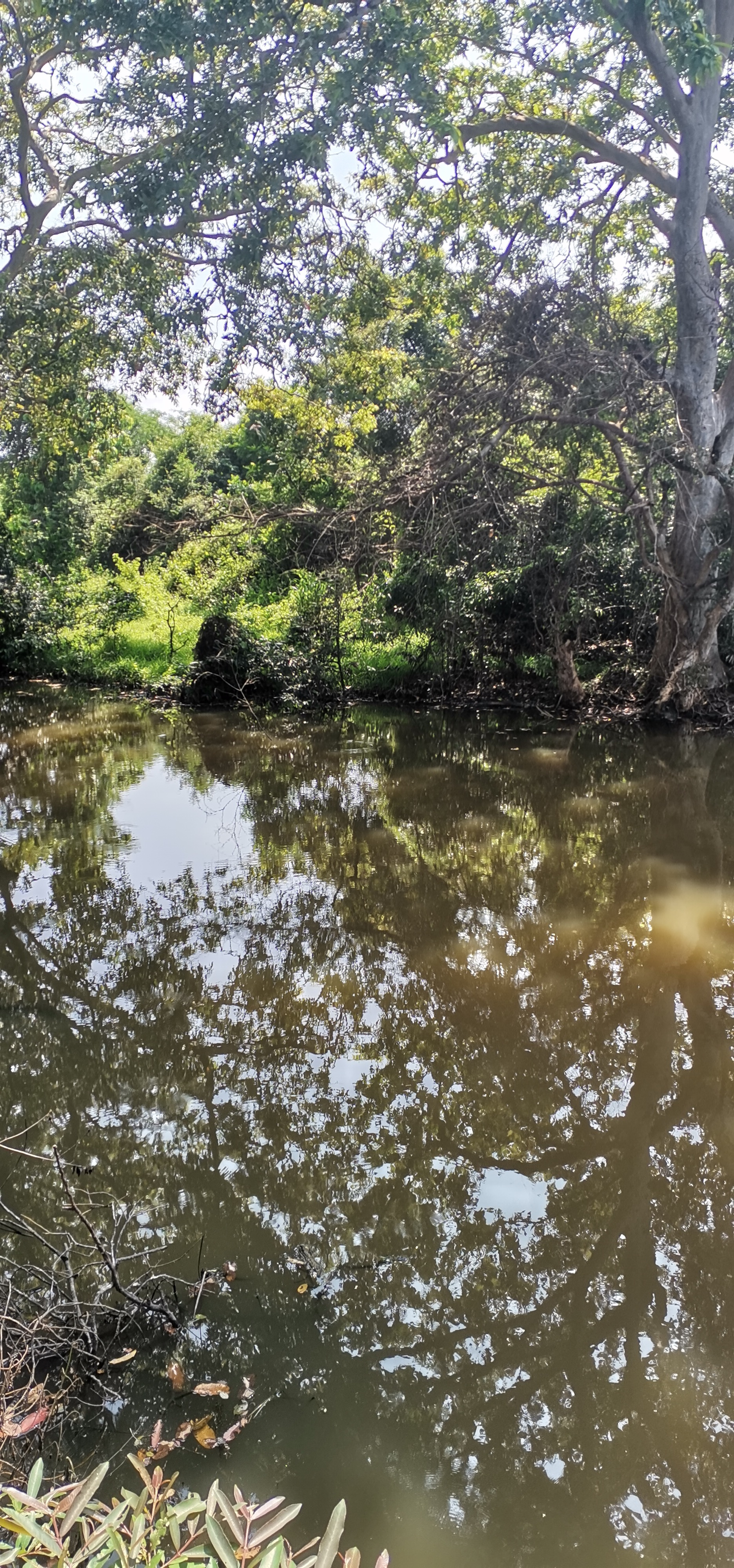
Parangi Aru

The Parangi Aru is a river in Northern Province, Sri Lanka. The river rises in central Vavuniya District, before flowing north/north-west through Vavuniya District, Mannar District and Mullaitivu District. The river empties into Palk Bay.

Variant forms of spelling for Parangi Aru or in other languages: Manal Aru, Paranki Aru, Parangi Aru, Manal Aru, Paranki Aru.

The Parangi Aru originates in the Nochchimoddai and Mamadu area, flows north-west through Nochchimoddai via Nochchimoddai Bridge and enters the western part of Mullaitivu district, passes through Siratikulam Nattangandal area, intersects the A32 road and merges with the Gulf of Mannar. The river has a catchment area of 832 km class, an average catchment rainfall of 1233 mm, a catchment area reaching the sea of 312 MCM, and a washout of 30.

Full Name : Parangi Aru

Primary Country Code : CE (Sri Lanka)

First-order administrative division code : 31 (North Eastern )

Region Font Code : 5 (Asia/Pacific)

Unique Feature Identifier : -2232919

Unique Name Identifier : -3085166

Latitude in decimal degrees : 9.1

Longitude in decimal degrees : 80.066667

Latitude in degrees, minutes, and seconds : 9° 06' 00" N

Longitude in degrees, minutes, and seconds : 80° 04' 00" E

Military Grid Reference System coordinates : 44PLR9743806040

Joint Operations Graphic reference : NC44-10

Feature Designation Code : STM (stream)

Name Type : N (BGN Standard name)

A form of the full name that allows for alphabetical sorting of the file into gazetteer sequence : PARANGIARU

Full Name with QWERTY characters : Parangi Aru

Modify Date : 1994-01-08

== See also ==
- List of rivers of Sri Lanka
