= Pallavarayankaddu Aru =

Coordinates: 9°18′N 80°08′E

Location
- Country: Sri Lanka
- Province: Northern Province
- Districts: Mullaitivu, Kilinochchi

Physical characteristics
- Source
  - location: Mullaitivu District
- Mouth: Palk Bay
  - location: Kilinochchi District
- Length: 27 km (17 mi)
- Basin size: 159 km^{2} (61 mi^{2})

The Pallavarayankaddu Aru is a river in Northern Province, Sri Lanka. The river rises in western Mullaitivu District. It flows north-west through Mullaitivu District and Kilinochchi District, before emptying into Palk Bay.

== See also ==
- List of rivers in Sri Lanka
