= Mandekal Aru =

Coordinates: 09°27′N 80°09′E

- Location within Sri Lanka

Location
- Country: Sri Lanka
- Province: Northern Province
- Districts: Mullaitivu, Kilinochchi

Physical characteristics
- Source
  - location: Mullaitivu District
- Mouth: Palk Bay
  - location: Kilinochchi District
- Length: 30 km (19 mi)
- Basin size: 297 km^{2} (115 mi^{2})

The Mandekal Aru is a river in Northern Province, Sri Lanka. The river rises in the western Mullaitivu District, before flowing north through Mullaitivu District and Kilinochchi District. It empties into Palk Bay.

== See also ==
- List of rivers in Sri Lanka
