= Kukule Ganga Dam =

- Location within Sri Lanka
- Country: Sri Lanka
- Coordinates: 06°34′48″N 80°19′37″E
- Purpose: Power
- Status: Operational
- Construction began: July 1999
- Opening date: June 2005
- Construction cost: Rs.16.5 billion

Dam and spillways
- Type of dam: Gravity dam
- Impounds: Kukule River
- Spillways: 4

Reservoir
- Creates: Kukule Ganga Reservoir
- Total capacity: 1,630,000 m^{3} (58,000,000 ft^{3})
- Catchment area: 312 km^{2} (120 mi^{2})
- Surface area: 88 ha (0.88 km^{2})
- Normal elevation: 205 m (673 ft)

Power Station
- Coordinates: 06°37′00″N 80°16′33″E
- Type: Run-of-the-river
- Turbines: 2 × 40 megawatts (54,000 hp)
- Installed capacity: 80 megawatts (110,000 hp)
- Annual generation: 317 gigawatt-hours (1,140 TJ)

The Kukule Ganga Dam is a 110 m (360 ft) gravity dam built across the Kukule River in Kalawana, Sri Lanka. The run-of-river dam feeds an underground hydroelectric power station located approximately 5 kilometres (3.1 mi) away, via tunnel.

== Dam and reservoir ==
The gravity dam is built across the Kukule River, which is a major mid-basin tributary of the Kalu River. The dam measures 110 m (361 ft) and 20 m (66 ft) in length and height respectively, with four spillways, and a sand trap on the left-bank. Each spillway gate measures 9.3 m (31 ft) high and 12 m (39 ft) wide, and uses the same automated technology as the Victoria Dam.

The dam creates the Kukule Ganga Reservoir, which has a capacity and catchment area of 1,630,000 m^{3} (58,000,000 ft^{3}) and 312 km^{2} (120 mi^{2}) respectively. After passing through the dam and sand traps, water from the reservoir is fed into a 5.71 km (3.55 mi) long tunnel, which leads to the underground power station. The tunnel from the dam to the power station, with an internal diameter of 10.5–4.8 m (34.4–15.7 ft), creates a gross head of 185 m (607 ft).

== Power station ==
Water from the tunnel is fed into the 80 MW underground power station, consisting of two 40 MW units. This capacity was intentionally limited to 70 MW due to load issues. The power station generates an average of 317 GWh annually.

Two transformers step up the voltage of the power generated to 132 kV, which is then transferred to the national grid at the Mathugama Substation, via a 27 kilometres (17 mi) long 132 kV double-circuit transmission line.

== See also ==
- Electricity in Sri Lanka
- List of dams and reservoirs in Sri Lanka
- List of power stations in Sri Lanka
