= Pali Aru =

Coordinates: 9.1667°N 80.1000°E

Pali Aru Chamalankulam Aru
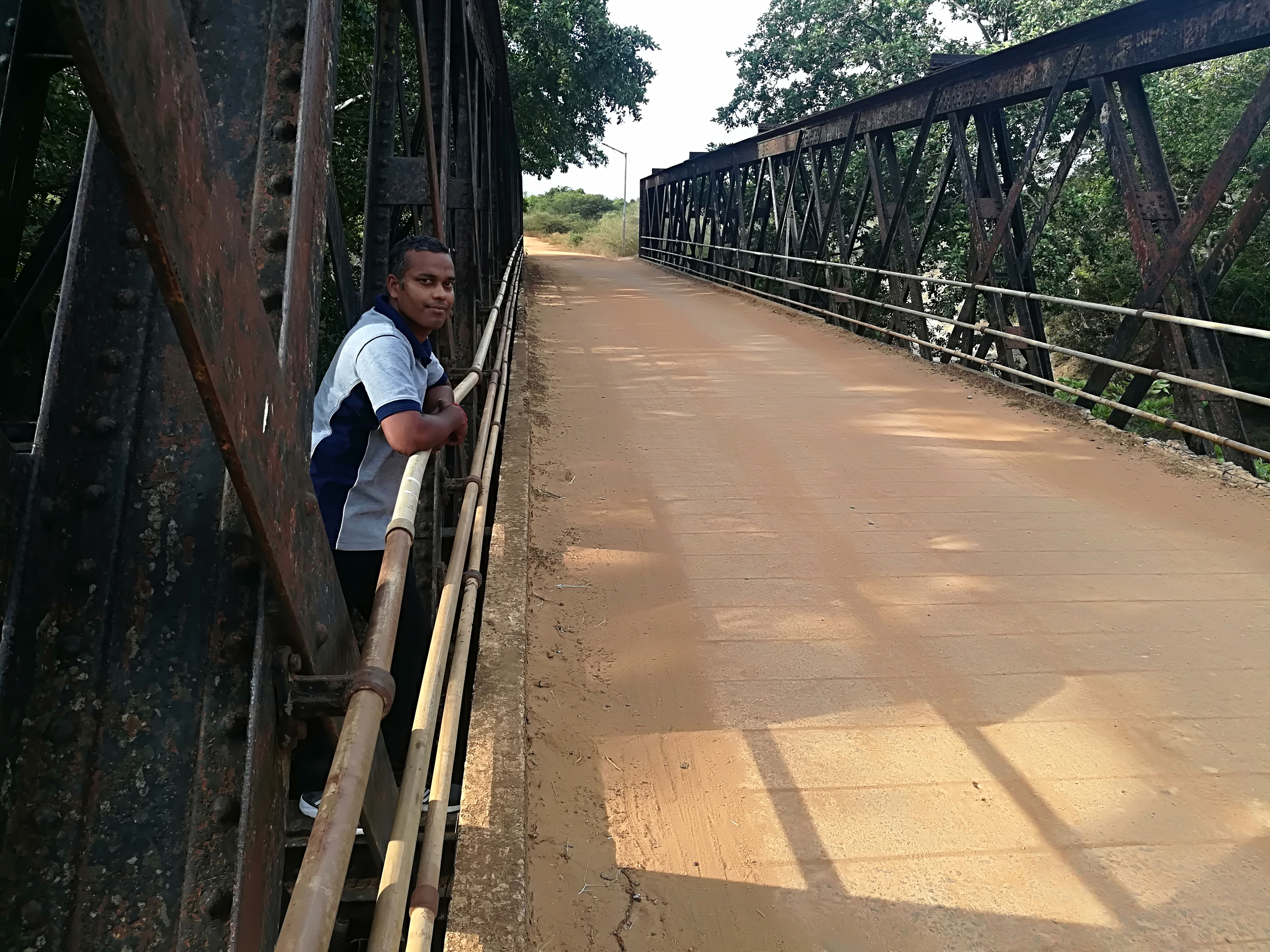

Location
- Country: Sri Lanka
- Province: Northern Province
- Districts: Vavuniya, Mullaitivu, Mannar

Physical characteristics
- Source
  - location: Vavuniya District
- Mouth: Palk Bay
  - location: Mannar District
- Length: 50 km (31 mi)
- Basin size: 451 km^{2} (174 mi^{2})

The Pali Aru is a river in Northern Province, Sri Lanka. The river rises in northern Vavuniya District, near Puliyankulam, flowing north/northwest through Vavuniya District, Mullaitivu District and Mannar District. The river empties into Palk Bay. The southern section of the river is sometimes known as the Chamalankulam Aru.

== See also ==
- List of rivers of Sri Lanka
