= Jaffna Lagoon =

Body of water in northern Sri Lanka

- Location within Sri Lanka
- Location: Jaffna District, Sri Lanka; Kilinochchi District, Sri Lanka
- Coordinates: 9°35′N 80°15′E
- Type: Lagoon
- Primary outflows: Indian Ocean
- Surface area: 400 square kilometres (150 sq mi)
- Surface elevation: Sea level

Jaffna Lagoon is a large lagoon off Jaffna District and Kilinochchi District, northern Sri Lanka. The lagoon is surrounded by the densely populated Jaffna Peninsula containing palmyra palms, coconut plantations, and rice paddies. There are numerous fishing villages and some salt pans. The lagoon has extensive mudflats, seagrass beds and some mangroves. The lagoon attracts a wide variety of water birds including American flamingoes, ducks, gulls, terns and other shorebirds.

== Jaffna Lagoon ==
Jaffna Lagoon is a shallow coastal stretch of water between the Jaffna and the Kilinochchi Districts in northern Sri Lanka. It is located between the longitudes of 79°54E and 80°20E, and the latitudes of 9°30N and 9°50N, and connected to Palk Bay through a channel to the west. It is connected to two internal lagoons, Vadamarachchi Lagoon and Uppu Aru Lagoon, and the external Chundikkulam Lagoon (sometimes known as Elephants Pass Lagoon). The lagoons receive fresh water from their catchment areas, contain brackish or saline water and are connected to the sea; sandbanks sometimes form across the channels connecting them to the sea and at other times, these are washed away.

The shores of the lagoon are largely sand, shingle and mud, with many small creeks. There are some mudflats, saltmarshes and areas of scrubby mangrove. The area round the lagoon is marshland bordered by thick jungle with dense undergrowth. There are disused saltpans and marshy scrubland, as well as coconut plantations and fishing camps, but little human occupation.

== History ==
The town has been inhabited by Tamils since they arrived on the island. It is used by fishermen across the North, who have used the lagoon for fishing purposes. In the 15th century, the region came under the control of the Portuguese, who built a fort in the area due to its strategic position overseeing the lagoon. Later, the region came under the control of the Dutch in 1658, the British in 1796, before finally coming under the control of Sri Lanka after it gained independence in 1948. During the Sri Lankan Civil War, the area was critical for the LTTE, as the lagoon was used to smuggle in weapons and funds from abroad. In addition, the lagoon was also used to ferry civilians between the Vanni and Jaffna. Many battles in the region were fought with the main or one of the main objectives being to solidify control over the lagoon and the surrounding area, such as in Pooneryn and Elephant Pass. Both sides in the conflict planted land mines, including in the shallow waters of the lagoons. As a result of the conflict, much of the civilian population left the surrounding areas, either to nearby major towns and cities, or as refugees abroad. Most of the land mines have now been cleared, bringing the possibility of introducing increased ecotourism.

== Flora and fauna ==
The lagoon is very shallow, mostly under 2 m (7 ft) deep, but in some places reaches 4 m (13 ft). There are extensive areas of seagrass meadows, with shrimps and various species of fish. Plants growing on the shore include the coconut palm, doub palm, Ipomoea pes-caprae, and Calotropis gigantea, Azadirachta indica, Cynodon dactylon and Argemone mexicana.

The lagoon is visited by large numbers of migratory water birds during the winter. These include the northern pintail, the Eurasian wigeon, the garganey, the black-tailed godwit, the Eurasian curlew, the Eurasian teal, and the northern shoveler. Other birds found here include gulls, terns and the American flamingo.
