= Battle of Elephant Pass =

Three conflicts during the Sri Lankan civil war were known as the Battle of Elephant Pass:

- First Battle of Elephant Pass, fought in July, 1991, for control of the Sri Lankan military base of Elephant Pass
- Second Battle of Elephant Pass, fought in April, 2000, for control of the Sri Lankan military base of Elephant Pass
- Third Battle of Elephant Pass, fought in January, 2009, for control of the Jaffna Peninsula
