= Uppu Aru Lagoon =

- Location within Northern Province Location within Sri Lanka
- Location: Jaffna District, Sri Lanka
- Coordinates: 9°41′N 80°05′E
- Type: Lagoon
- Primary outflows: Jaffna Lagoon
- Surface area: 30 square kilometers (12 sq mi)
- Max. depth: 3 meters (9.8 ft)
- Surface elevation: Sea level

Uppu Aru lagoon is a lagoon in Jaffna District, northern Sri Lanka. The lagoon separates the Valikamam region from the Thenmarachchi region.

The lagoon is linked to Jaffna Lagoon by a short channel to the south. The lagoon's water is brackish.

The lagoon is surrounded by a densely populated region containing palmyra palms, coconut plantations, grassland, rice paddies and extensive vegetable gardens.

The lagoon has extensive mudflats and salt marshes. It is surrounded by mangroves, particularly Avicennia. The lagoon attracts a wide variety of water birds including American flamingoes, ducks, garganey, black-tailed godwit and other shorebirds.
