= Malwathu Oya =

Malwathu Oya Aruvi Aru
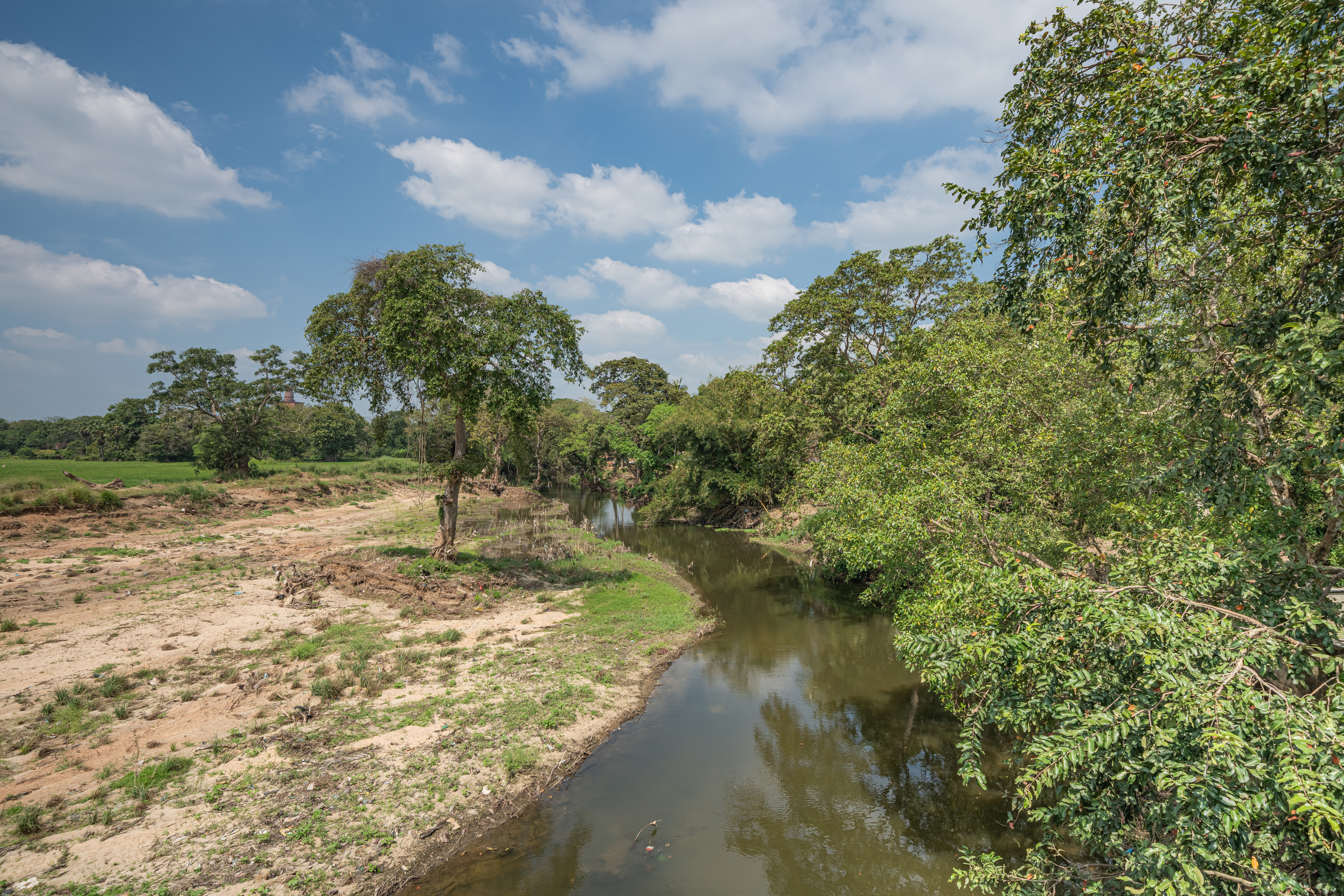
- Malwathu River in Anuradhapura
- Native name: මල්වතු ඔය (Sinhala)

Location
- Country: Sri Lanka

Physical characteristics
- Source: Inamaluwa Mountains
  - location: Matale and Anuradhapura Districts
- Mouth: Palk Strait
  - location: Mannar, Northern Province
  - coordinates: 08°48′08″N 79°55′40″E
- Length: 164 km (102 mi)

The Malwathu Oya (Sinhala: මල්වතු ඔය Malwathu Oya, Tamil: அருவி ஆறு Aruvi Aru) is the second longest river in Sri Lanka. The river originates in the North Central Province of Sri Lanka and enters the sea on the northwest coast, into the Gulf of Mannar, near Vankalai. It is a seasonal river that spans over 164 km (102 mi) through paddy and forest lands, which are used by the inhabitants to cultivate for their survival.

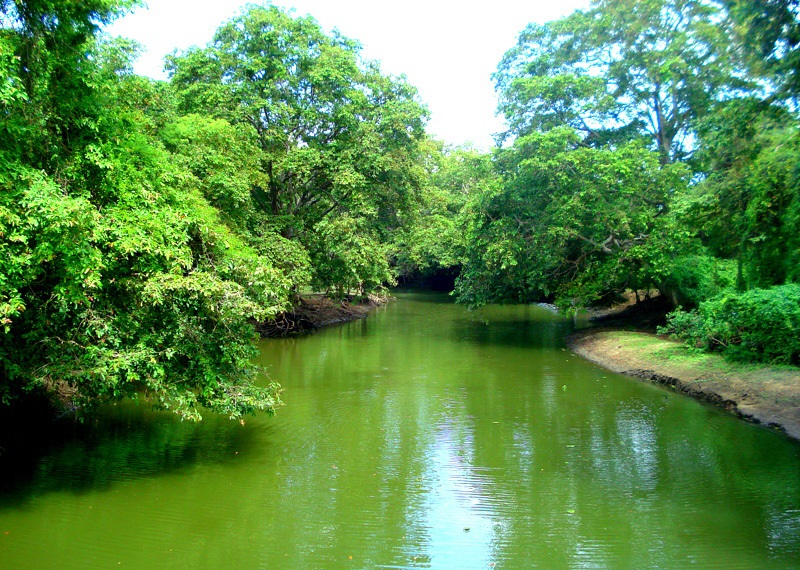
Malwathu river

The river basin covers an area of 3,284 km^{2} (1,268 sq mi) (with a length of 125 km (78 mi), a maximum width of 40 km (25 mi) at an average height of 85.5 m (281 ft) above sea level). The average annual rainfall in the basin area is 1,223 mm (48.1 in). The Ritigala mountain range, which comprises four main peaks (the highest of which is over 900 m (3,000 ft) high), in the upper reaches of the river, serves as the main catchment.

== Tributaries ==
- Kanadara Oya
- Maminiya Oya
- Kadahatu Oya
- Kal Aru
- Narivili Aru

== See also ==
- List of rivers in Sri Lanka
