= Nay Aru (Mullaitivu) =

Coordinates: 9.1333°N 80.8167°E

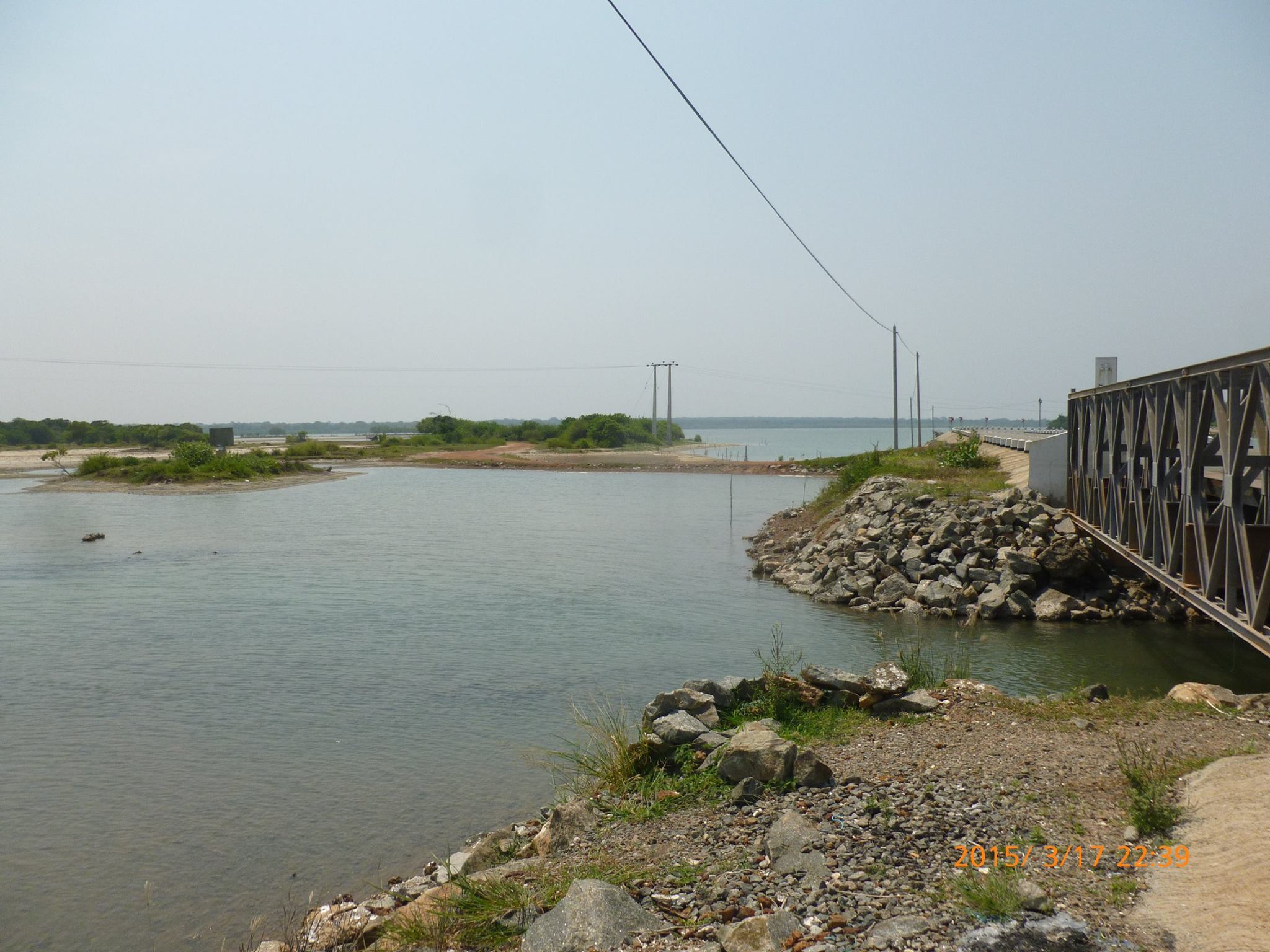
- Nayaru in Mullaitivu

Location
- Country: Sri Lanka
- Province: Northern Province
- District: Mullaitivu District

Physical characteristics
- Source
  - location: Mullaitivu District
- Mouth: Nai Aru Lagoon
  - location: Mullaitivu District
- Length: 20 km (12 mi)
- Basin size: 187 km^{2} (72 mi^{2})

The Nay Aru (or Nai Aru) is a small river in Northern Province, Sri Lanka. The 20 km (12 mi) long river rises in south-east Mullaitivu District, before flowing north-east through Mullaitivu District. The river empties into Nai Aru Lagoon.

== See also ==
- List of rivers in Sri Lanka
