= Kumbukkan Oya =

- Location within Sri Lanka

Physical characteristics
- Source
  - location: Dombagahawela
- Mouth
  - location: Arugam Bay
  - coordinates: 06°48′36″N 81°49′25″E
  - elevation: Sea level
- Length: 116 km (72 mi)
- Discharge
  - maximum: 250 10^{6} Sq.m

The Kumbukkan Oya is the twelfth-longest river of Sri Lanka. The 116 km (72 mi) long river runs across two provinces and two districts.

Its catchment area receives approximately 2,115 million cubic metres of rain per year, and approximately 12 percent of the water reaches the sea. It has a catchment area of 1,218 square kilometres.
