= Yan Oya =

- Location within Sri Lanka

Physical characteristics
- Source
  - location: Ritigala
- Mouth
  - location: Pulmoddai
  - coordinates: 08°55′04″N 81°00′58″E
  - elevation: Sea level
- Length: 142 km (88 mi)
- Discharge
  - maximum: 412 10^{6}Sq.m

The Yan Oya is the fifth-longest river of Sri Lanka. The 142 km (88 mi) long river's catchment area receives approximately 2,371 million cubic metres of rain per year, and approximately 17 percent of the water reaches the sea. The Yan Oya has a catchment area of 1,520 square kilometres.
