= Theravil Aru =

Coordinates: 9°27′N 80°36′E

Location
- Country: Sri Lanka
- Province: Northern Province
- Districts: Mullaitivu, Kilinochchi

Physical characteristics
- Source
  - location: Mullaitivu District
- Mouth: Chundikkulam Lagoon
  - location: Kilinochchi District
- Length: 23 km (14 mi)
- Basin size: 90 km^{2} (35 sq mi)

The Theravil Aru (or Toravil Aru) is a river in Northern Province, Sri Lanka. The river rises in central Mullaitivu District, before flowing north through Mullaitivu and Kilinochchi districts. The river empties into Chundikkulam Lagoon.

== See also ==
- List of rivers in Sri Lanka
