= Kukule Ganga =

Kukule Ganga Kukule River

Location
- Country: Sri Lanka
- Province: Sabaragamuwa Province

The Kukule Ganga is a river in Sabaragamuwa Province in southwestern Sri Lanka. The Kukule Ganga Dam and reservoir lies along the river. The Kukule Ganga Dam has been built to generate electricity by using this river and has a basin area of 31,000 ha (120 sq mi), an annual average rainfall of 3,800 mm (150 in) and annual water yield of 976,000 ha/m (735,000 acre/ft).
