= Netheli Aru =

Coordinates: 09°28′N 80°33′E

Location
- Country: Sri Lanka
- Province: Northern Province
- District: Mullaitivu, Kilinochchi

Physical characteristics
- Source
  - location: Mullaitivu District
- Mouth: Chundikkulam Lagoon
  - location: Kilinochchi District
- Length: 24 km (15 mi)
- Basin size: 120 km^{2} (46 mi^{2})

The Netheli Aru is a river in Northern Province, Sri Lanka. The river rises in central Mullaitivu District, and flow north through Mullaitivu District and Kilinochchi District. The river empties into Chundikkulam Lagoon after a 24 km (15mi) journey.

== See also ==
- List of rivers in Sri Lanka
