= Chalai Lagoon =

- Location within Sri Lanka
- Location: Mullaitivu District, Sri Lanka
- Coordinates: 9°23′N 80°40′E
- Type: Lagoon
- Primary outflows: Indian Ocean
- Surface area: 14.6 square kilometres (5.6 sq mi)
- Surface elevation: Sea level
- Settlements: Chalai; Putumattalan; Valayanmadam

Chalai Lagoon is a lagoon in Mullaitivu District, north-east Sri Lanka. The town of Chalai is located on a sand bar between the lagoon and the Indian Ocean.

The lagoon is fed by a number of small rivers. It is linked to the sea by a narrow channel near Chalai. The lagoon's water is brackish.

The lagoon is surrounded by dense forest, scrubland and some rice paddies. The land is used for fishing and some salt production.

The lagoon has extensive sea grass beds and mangrove swamp. The lagoon attracts a wide variety of water birds including ducks, gulls, terns and other shorebirds.
