= Per Aru =

Location
- Country: Sri Lanka
- Province: Northern Province
- Districts: Vavuniya, Mullaitivu

Physical characteristics
- Source
  - location: Vavuniya District
- Mouth: Nanthi Lagoon
  - location: Mullaitivu District
- Length: 32 km (20 mi)
- Basin size: 374 km^{2} (144 mi^{2})

The Per Aru is a river in Northern Province, Sri Lanka. The river rises in northern Vavuniya District, before flowing north/north-east through Vavuniya District and Mullaitivu District. The river empties into Nanthi Kadal lagoon.

== See also ==
- List of rivers in Sri Lanka
