= Kanakarayan Aru =

Location
- Country: Sri Lanka
- Province: Northern Province
- Districts: Vavuniya, Mullaitivu, Kilinochchi

Physical characteristics
- Source
  - location: Vavuniya District
- Mouth: Chundikkulam Lagoon
- Length: 86 km (53 mi)
- Basin size: 906 km^{2} (350 sq mi)

The Kanakarayan Aru is a river in Northern Province, Sri Lanka. The river rises in eastern Vavuniya District, near Omanthai, and flows north through Vavuniya District, Mullaitivu District and Kilinochchi District. It empties into the Chundikkulam Lagoon.

== See also ==
- List of rivers of Sri Lanka
