= Nai Aru Lagoon =

Lagoon in Sri Lanka

- Location within Northern Province
- Location: Mullaitivu District, Sri Lanka
- Coordinates: 9°08′N 80°52′E
- Type: Lagoon
- Primary outflows: Indian Ocean
- Surface area: 17.6 square kilometres (6.8 sq mi)
- Max. depth: 4 metres (13 ft)
- Surface elevation: Sea level
- Settlements: Alampil; Chammalai; Kumulamunai

Nai Aru Lagoon (or Nay Aru Lagoon) is an estuarine lagoon in Mullaitivu District, north-east Sri Lanka.

The lagoon is fed by a number of small rivers, including Nay Aru (Mullaitivu). It is linked to the sea by a narrow channel to the south that is very often blocked by a sand bar. The lagoon's water is brackish.

The lagoon is surrounded by dense forest, scrubland, rice paddies and coconut palm. The land is used for prawn fishing and paddy cultivation.

The lagoon has extensive sea grass beds and mangrove swamp. The lagoon attracts a wide variety of water birds including ducks, gulls, terns and other shorebirds.
