= Nanthi Kadal =

- நந்திக்கடல் (Tamil); නන්ති කඩාල් (Sinhala)
- Location within Northern Province
- Location: Mullaitivu District, Sri Lanka
- Coordinates: 9°17′0″N 80°46′0″E
- Type: Lagoon
- Primary inflows: Indian Ocean
- Primary outflows: Indian Ocean
- Max. length: 14 kilometres (8.7 mi)
- Max. width: 5 kilometres (3.1 mi)
- Islands: Nerunchipuddy
- Settlements: Mullaitivu

Nanthi Kadal (Tamil: நந்திக்கடல், romanized: Nantikkaṭal, Sinhala: නන්ති කඩාල්, romanized: nanti kaḍāl) is a lagoon in Mullaitivu District, north-east Sri Lanka. The English translation of Nanthi Kadal is "the sea of conches". Fed by a number of small rivers including Per Aru, the town of Mullaitivu is located on land sandwiched between it and the Indian Ocean. Nanthi Kadal is thus sometimes referred to as Mullaitivu lagoon.

The lagoon is notable for being the location of the military defeat of the LTTE and death of its leader Vellupillai Prabhakaran.
