= Chundikkulam Lagoon =

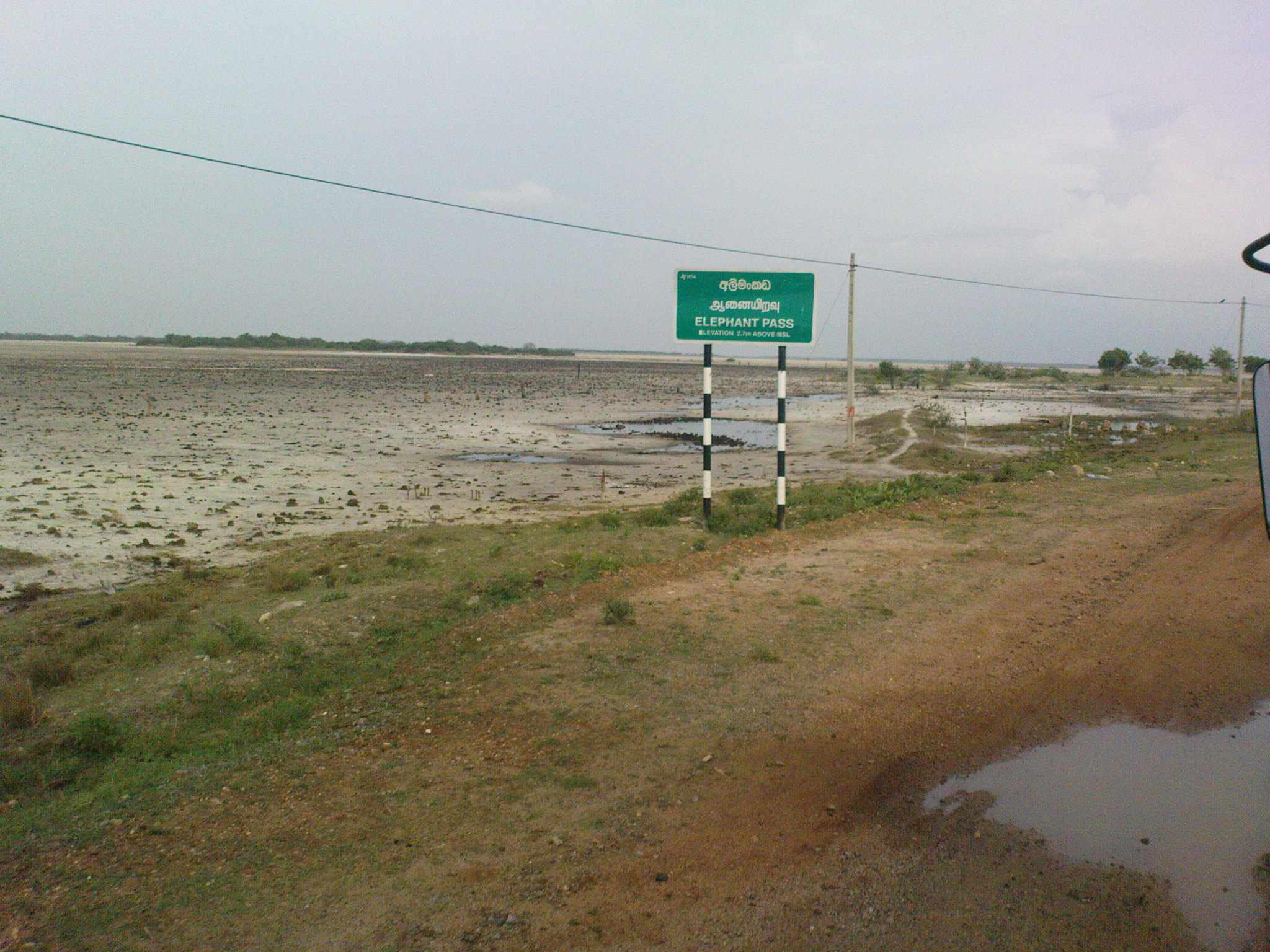
- Chundikkulam Lagoon

- Location within Sri Lanka
- Location: Jaffna District, Sri Lanka; Kilinochchi District, Sri Lanka
- Coordinates: 9°29′N 80°30′E
- Type: Lagoon
- Surface area: 135 square kilometres (52 sq mi)
- Surface elevation: Sea level
- Settlements: Chundikkulam

Chundikkulam Lagoon (Tamil: சுண்டிக்குளம் கடல் நீரேரி, Sinhala: කුම්බවැව Kumbavæwa) is a lagoon in Jaffna District and Kilinochchi District, north-east Sri Lanka. The town of Chundikkulam is located on a narrow piece of land between the lagoon and the Indian Ocean. The lagoon is sometimes referred to as Elephant Pass Lagoon.

The lagoon is fed by a number of small rivers from the south, including Kanakarayan Aru, Netheli Aru and Theravil Aru. It used to be linked to Jaffna Lagoon but since the construction of the causeway at Elephant Pass the lagoon has in effect been a lake. The lagoon's water is brackish.

The lagoon is surrounded by palmyra palm plantations and scrubland. The land is used for prawn fishing and some salt production.

The lagoon has small areas of mangrove swamp and sea grass beds. The lagoon attracts a wide variety of water birds including storks, ibis, ducks, coot, gulls and tern.

Most of the lagoon was designated a bird sanctuary in 1938.
