= Palk Bay =

Water body between India and Sri Lanka

Coordinates: 9°30′N 79°15′E

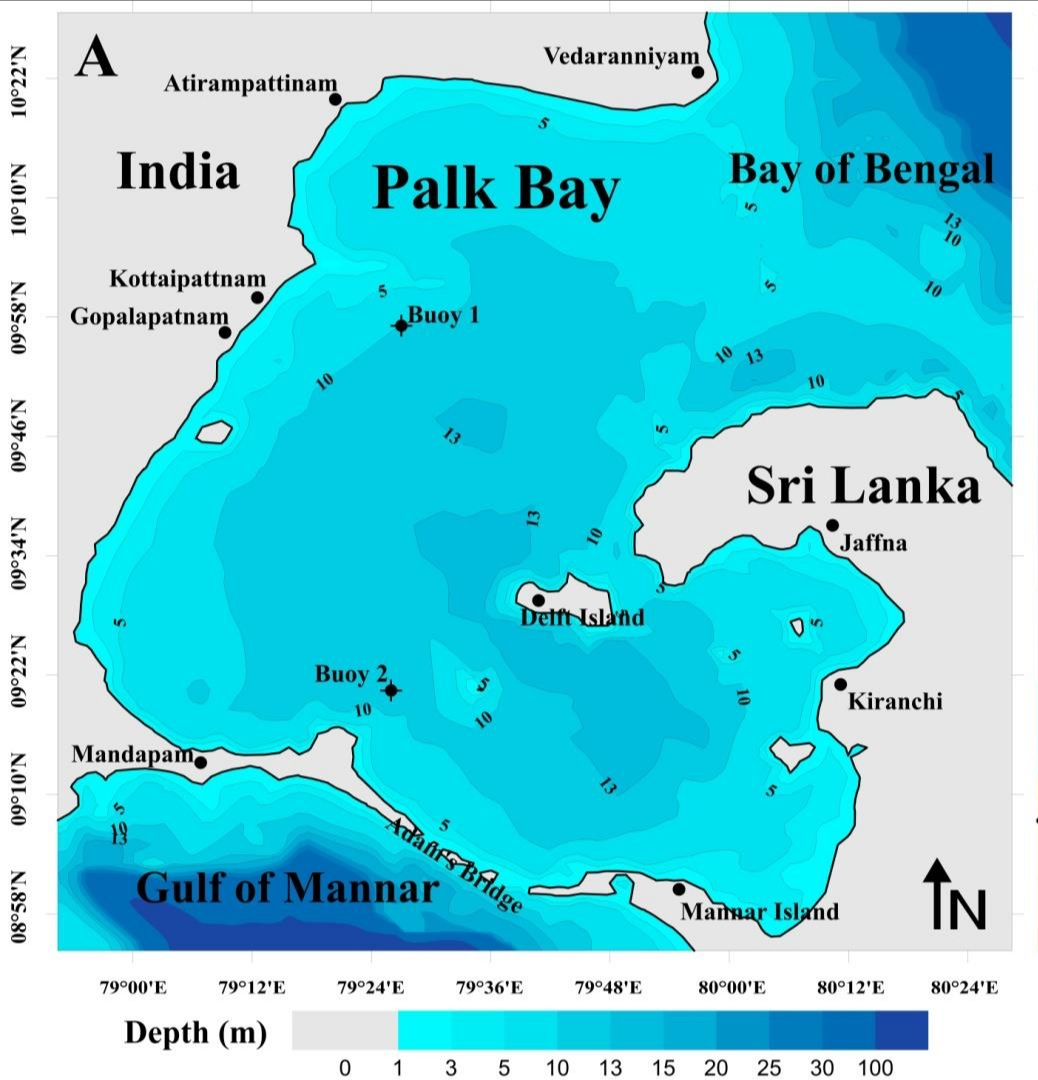
Bathymetry of Palk Bay developed by interpolation of National Hydrographic datasets

Palk Bay is a semi-enclosed shallow water body between the southeast coast of India and Sri Lanka, with a water depth maximum of 13 m. Palk Bay is located between 8° 50′ and 10° North latitudes and 78° 50′ and 80° 30′ East longitudes. The width of the bay ranges from 57 to 107 km and the length is around 150 km. It is one of the major sinks for sediments along with the Gulf of Mannar. Sediments discharged by rivers and transported by the surf currents as littoral drift settle in this sink. Few scientists have tried to understand the wave characteristics within the Palk Bay.

In the southern regions close to Dhanushkodi, wind seas dominate. The north-eastern region of Palk Bay is exposed to the Bay of Bengal through the shallow Palk Strait allowing swells to enter. To the south, Adam's Bridge separates Palk Bay from the Gulf of Mannar. Despite being a very shallow channel, wave effects are transmitted to a small extent through the Adam's Bridge passage. It is interesting to notice that, despite the visible block along the Adam's Bridge, the passage of wind wave and ocean current (to a very small extent) from the Gulf of Mannar to the bay is evident. Meanwhile, even with a wider and broader opening along the north-eastern borders of the bay, facing the Bay of Bengal, the wind wave and ocean current fluxes are less significant here.

It was named after Sir Robert Palk, 1st Baronet, governor of the Madras Presidency.

== Ramayana and Palk Bay ==
Palk Bay is associated with an ancient Sanskrit epic Ramayana popular over the Indian Subcontinent, which follows Prince Rama's quest to rescue his beloved wife Sita from the clutches of Ravana with the help of an army of Vaanaras (monkeys). It is traditionally attributed to the authorship of the sage Valmiki and dated to around 500 BCE to 100 BCE. The epic describes how Prince Rama and his followers managed to cross the Palk Bay to reach Lanka (Sri Lanka) to save Sita.
