= Don Gunasena Athukorala =

Srilankan civil engineer

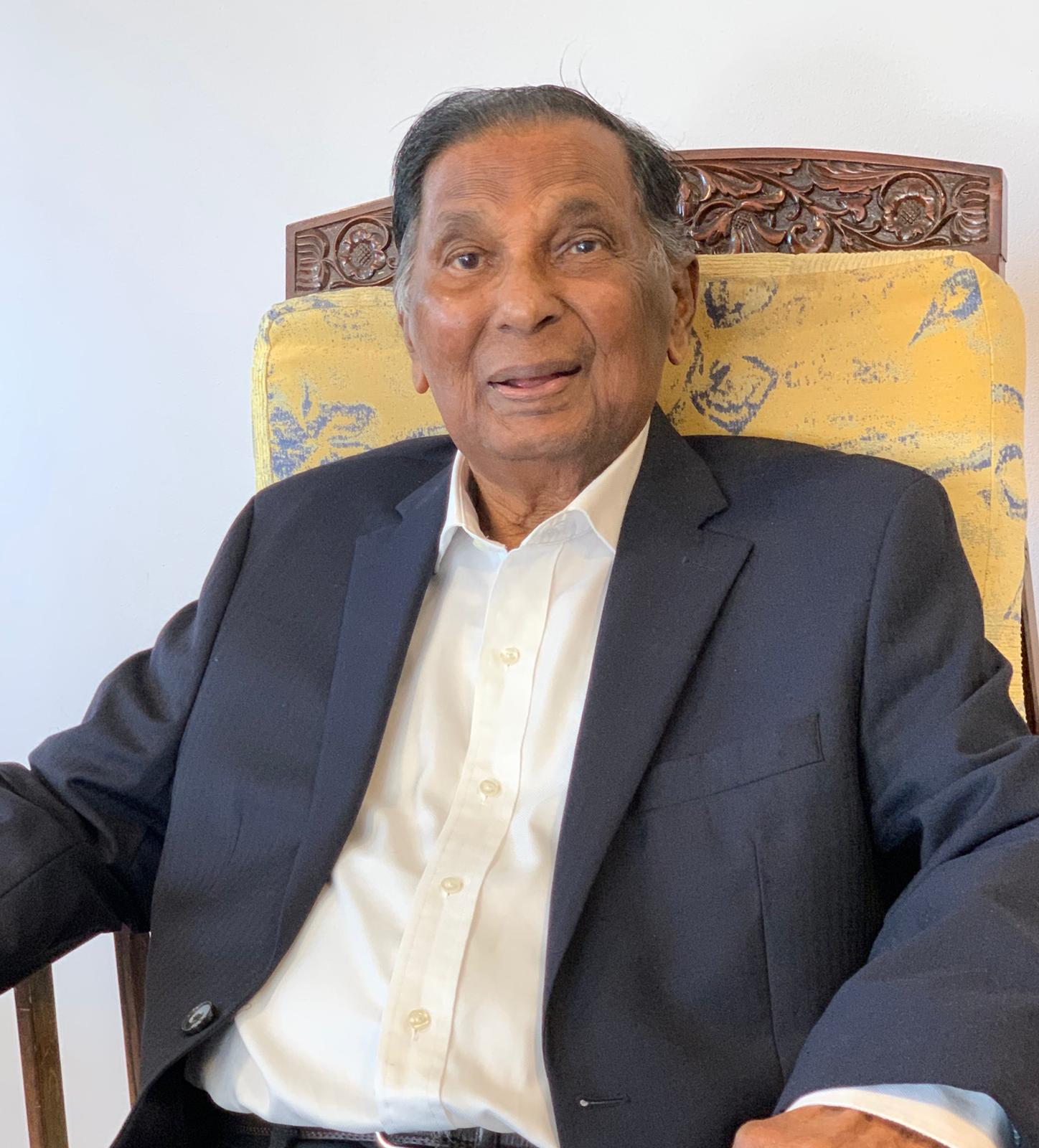
- Athukorala in August 2020
- Born: May 25, 1924; Aruggoda, Panadura, Sri Lanka
- Died: May 22, 2024 (aged 99)
- Education: University of London (1950)
- Occupation: Civil engineer
- Spouse: Irangani Seneviratne (m. 1957)

Don Gunasena Athukorala (25 May 1924 – 22 February 2024) was a civil engineer who was a founding member of the State Engineering Corporation of Sri Lanka, where he later served as the Deputy General Manager in 1970, and later the Chairman in 1977. In recognition of his contributions, Don Gunasena was made an Honorary Life Fellow of the Institution of Engineers, Sri Lanka in January 1971.

== Education ==
Don Gunasena received his early education from St. John's College and Sri Sumangala College in Panadura. He further had his Bachelor of Science degree in Civil Engineering from the University of London in 1950, and obtained his membership into the Institution of Civil Engineers, London (MICE) in 1955.

== Career ==
After his education in London, Don Gunasena worked as an engineer for Willment Brothers Limited. He left for Scott Wilson Group in 1952, where he was the Design Engineer. He returned to Sri Lanka in 1954, and joined the Department of Industries as an Assistant Engineer.

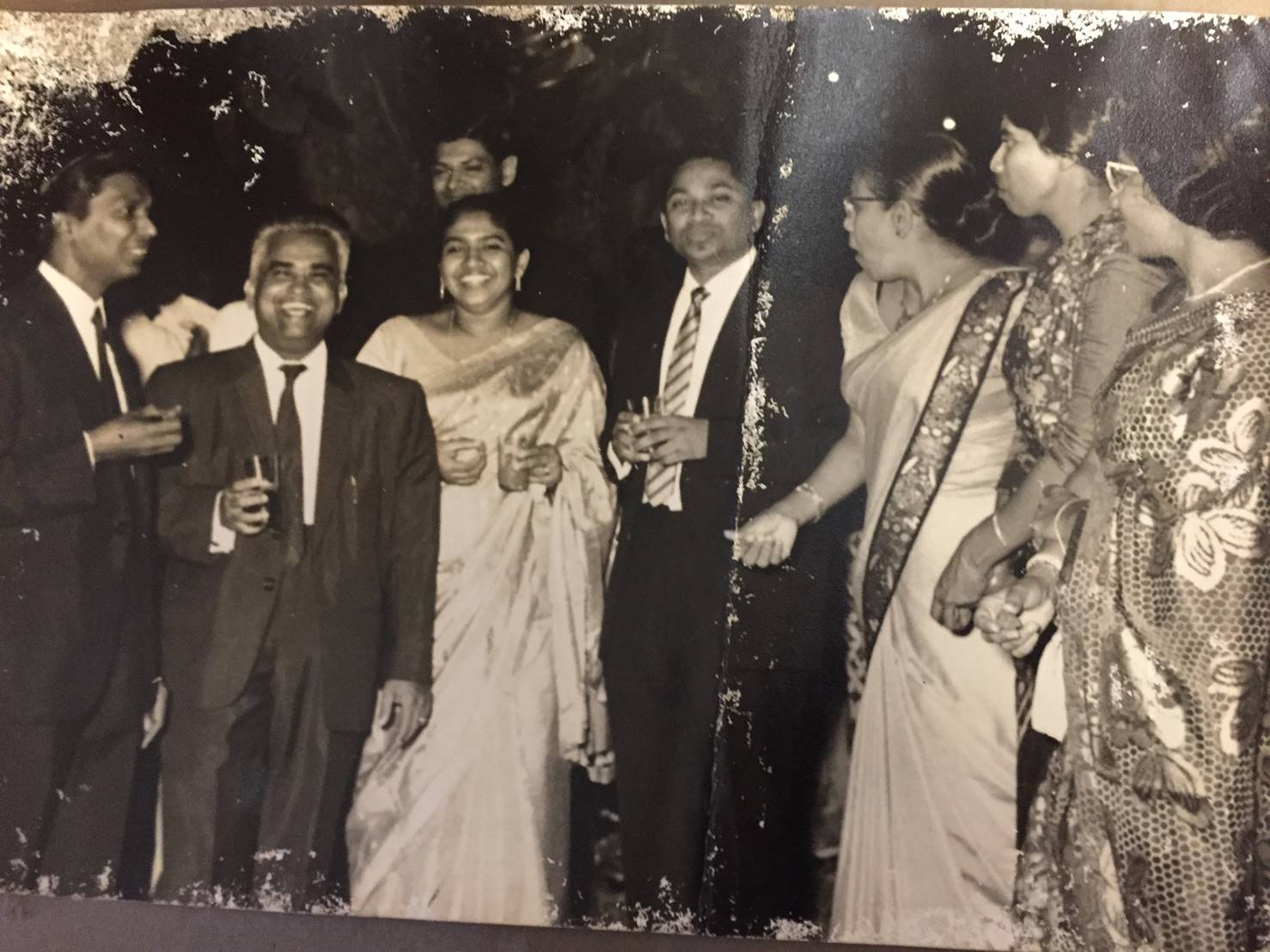
Senior Management of SEC L-R: Don Gunasena, A. N. S. Kulasinghe, Neville Ladduwahetti, Janaki Gunasekera, Titus Gunasekera, Mrs Kulasinghe, Mahes Ladduwahetti and Irangani Athukorala in 1970

Don Gunasena was among the engineers who established the State Engineering Corporation (SEC), which was approved by the Parliament in January 1962, and became the Deputy General Manager to A. N. S. Kulasinghe who was the Chairman.

With the arrival of the Communist Party of Sri Lanka to run the Ministry of Housing and Construction and the subsequent politicization of the SEC, Don Gunasena departed to the United Kingdom. In the UK he joined Sir William Halcrow & Partners.

Don Gunasena returned to Sri Lanka and joined the Mahaweli Development Board (MDB) and was involved in the design and construction of the Polgolla Dam and Bowatenna Dam. In 1977, he returned to SEC as the Chairman.

With the enactment of the Mahaweli Authority in 1979, Don Gunasena was appointed Director Head Works. (Note: The main function of the division was to manage the completed projects under the Mahaweli Development programme, including Administration, Operation, and Maintenance work.) He managed some of the most notable engineerings works in the country including the Polgolla, Randenigala, Victoria, Kotmale, and Rantembe Dams and related hydroelectric power stations. He retired in the mid-1990s with a view towards migrating to Australia in 1999. In his retired life he authored a book Buddha's Principle of Relativity: Mind-Body Stress, and was published in 2018.

== Family and personal life ==
Don Gunasena was born on 25 May 1924 to Don Hendrik and Dona Catherina Athukorala. He married Irangani Seneviratne in August 1957, and had three children. In January 1999, he migrated to Sydney, Australia with his wife.
