= Deduru Oya Dam =

Dam in Wariyapola, Sri Lanka

- Location within Sri Lanka
- Country: Sri Lanka
- Location: Wariyapola
- Coordinates: 07°43′06″N 80°16′28″E
- Purpose: Irrigation
- Status: Operational
- Construction began: 2008
- Opening date: 2014
- Construction cost: Rs. 9.5 billion

Dam and spillways
- Type of dam: Embankment
- Impounds: Deduru Oya
- Height: 20 m (66 ft)
- Length: 2,400 m (7,900 ft)
- Spillways: 8

Reservoir
- Creates: Deduru Oya Reservoir
- Total capacity: 75,000,000 m^{3} (2.6×10^{9} ft^{3})

Deduru Oya Power Station
- Operator: MOPE
- Commission date: 2014
- Type: Conventional
- Installed capacity: 1.5 MW

The Deduru Oya Dam is an embankment dam built across the Deduru River in Kurunegala District of Sri Lanka. Built in 2014, the primary purpose of the dam is to retain for irrigation purposes approximately a billion cubic metres of water, which would otherwise flow out to sea. Site studies of the dam began in 2006 and construction started in 2008. It was ceremonially completed in 2014, with the presence of then President Mahinda Rajapaksa.

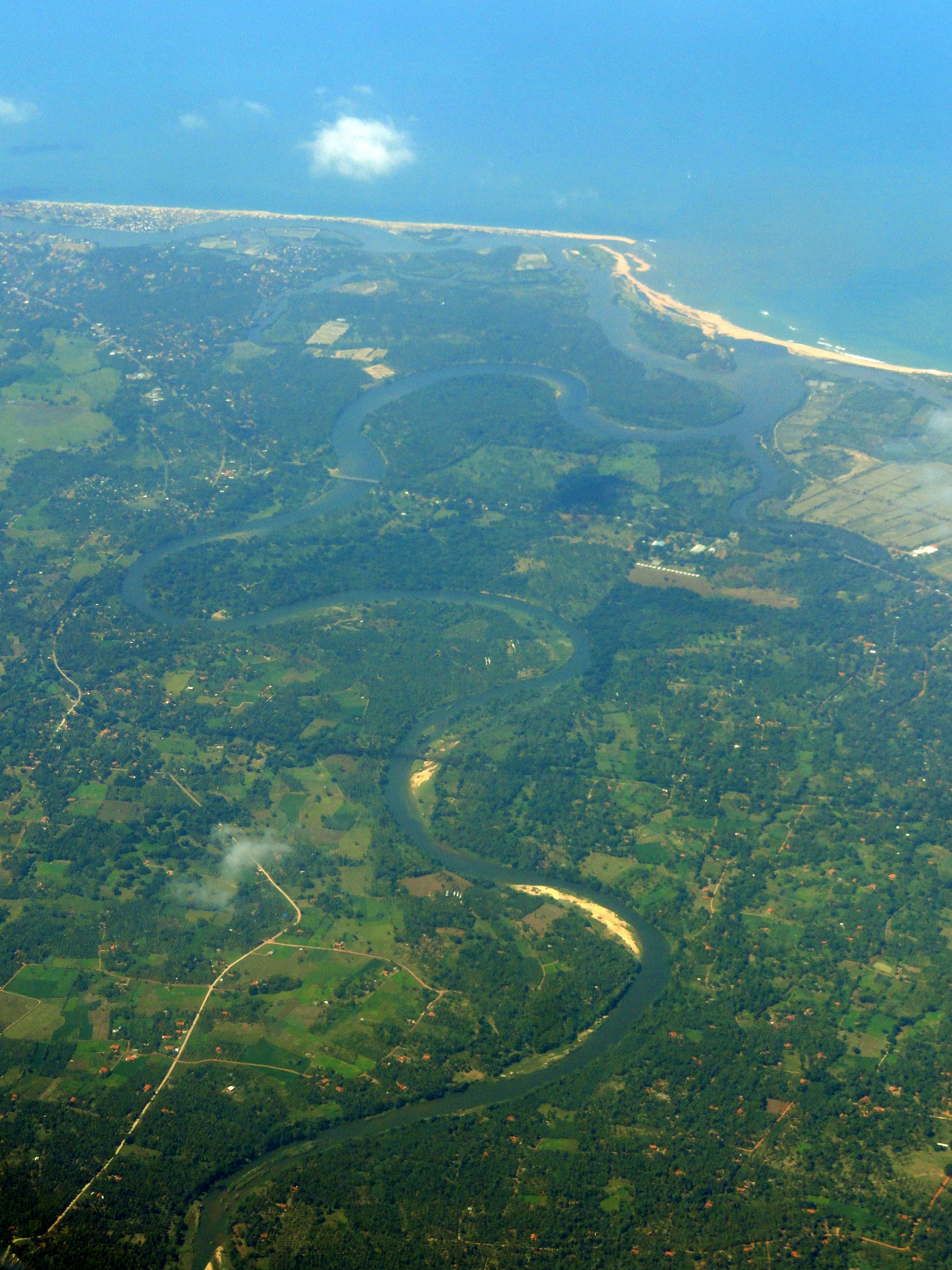
The mouth of Deduru Oya, approximately 80km downstream of the dam.

Site studies and design of the dam was done by engineers from the Ministry of Irrigation. The dam, which measures approximately 2,400 m (7,900 ft) wide, creates the Deduru Oya Reservoir, which has a capacity of 75,000,000 m^{3} (2.6×10^{9} ft^{3}). Water from the reservoir is used to irrigate approximately 11,000 hectares (27,000 acres) of farmland, while also powering a 1.5 megawatt hydroelectric power station, operated by the Ministry of Power and Energy.

In addition to the eight sluice gates, water from the reservoir is channelled from the reservoir (for irrigation) via three canals, namely the Left Canal, Central Canal, and the South Canal. The South Canal is a trans-basin concrete canal measuring 33 km (21 mi), channelling water from the Deduru Oya Reservoir to the Inginimitiya Reservoir at a flow rate of 300 cu ft/s (8.5 m^{3}/s).

== See also ==
- List of dams and reservoirs in Sri Lanka
- List of power stations in Sri Lanka
