= Rambakan Oya Dam =

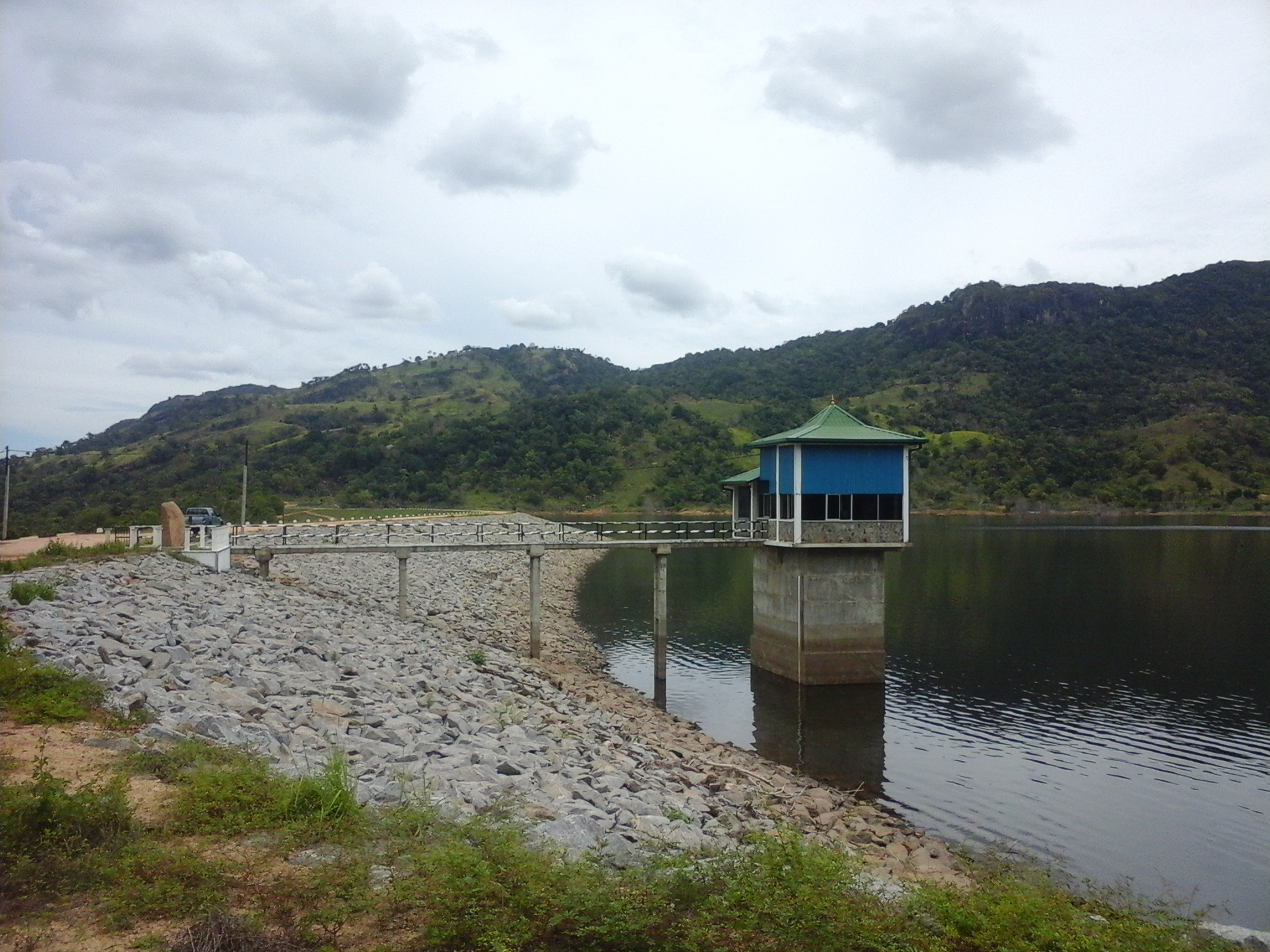

- Location within Sri Lanka
- Country: Sri Lanka
- Location: Maha Oya
- Coordinates: 7°27′4.85″N 81°24′20.47″E
- Purpose: Irrigation and Domestic water supply
- Status: Operational
- Construction began: 12 February 2007
- Opening date: 20 July 2013
- Owner: Ministry of Irrigation

Dam and spillways
- Type of dam: Earthen dam
- Height: 24.7 m (81 ft)
- Length: 1,225 m (4,019 ft)
- Width (crest): 7 m (23 ft)
- Spillways: 2
- Spillway type: Radial Gate
- Spillway capacity: 554.75 m^{3}/s (19,591 cu ft/s)

Reservoir
- Creates: Rambakan Oya Reservoir
- Total capacity: 56,000,000 m^{3} (2.0×10^{9} cu ft)
- Catchment area: 129.5 km^{2} (50.0 mi^{2})

The Rambakan Oya Dam is an embankment dam in Maha Oya, Eastern Province, Sri Lanka. The reservoir was designed and constructed by the Sri Lanka Mahaveli Authority and currently functions under the direction of the Ministry of Irrigation and Water Resources Management. It has been created by building an Earthen dam which is about 1,225m in length across the Mundeni Aru river.

The Rambakan Oya reservoir project is a multipurpose irrigation project which is commissioned to find a solution for the drinking water issue and irrigation problems in the area. It is the 10th zone of Mahaweli Development scheme and located bordering Badulla, Monaragala and Ampara districts.

== History ==
=== Ancient time ===
There are archaeological evidences, those reveals about previous attempts to construct an irrigation tank here during the ancient time periods. According to them there are different legends and archaeological views on ancient construction of Rambakan Oya Reservoir. It is believed that construction of Rambaken Oya Reservoir was commenced by prince Giri Abaya who ruled the East, in third century, B.C. According to some other historical evidences it was commenced by Prince Saddhatissa (137-119 BC).

=== Ruins ===
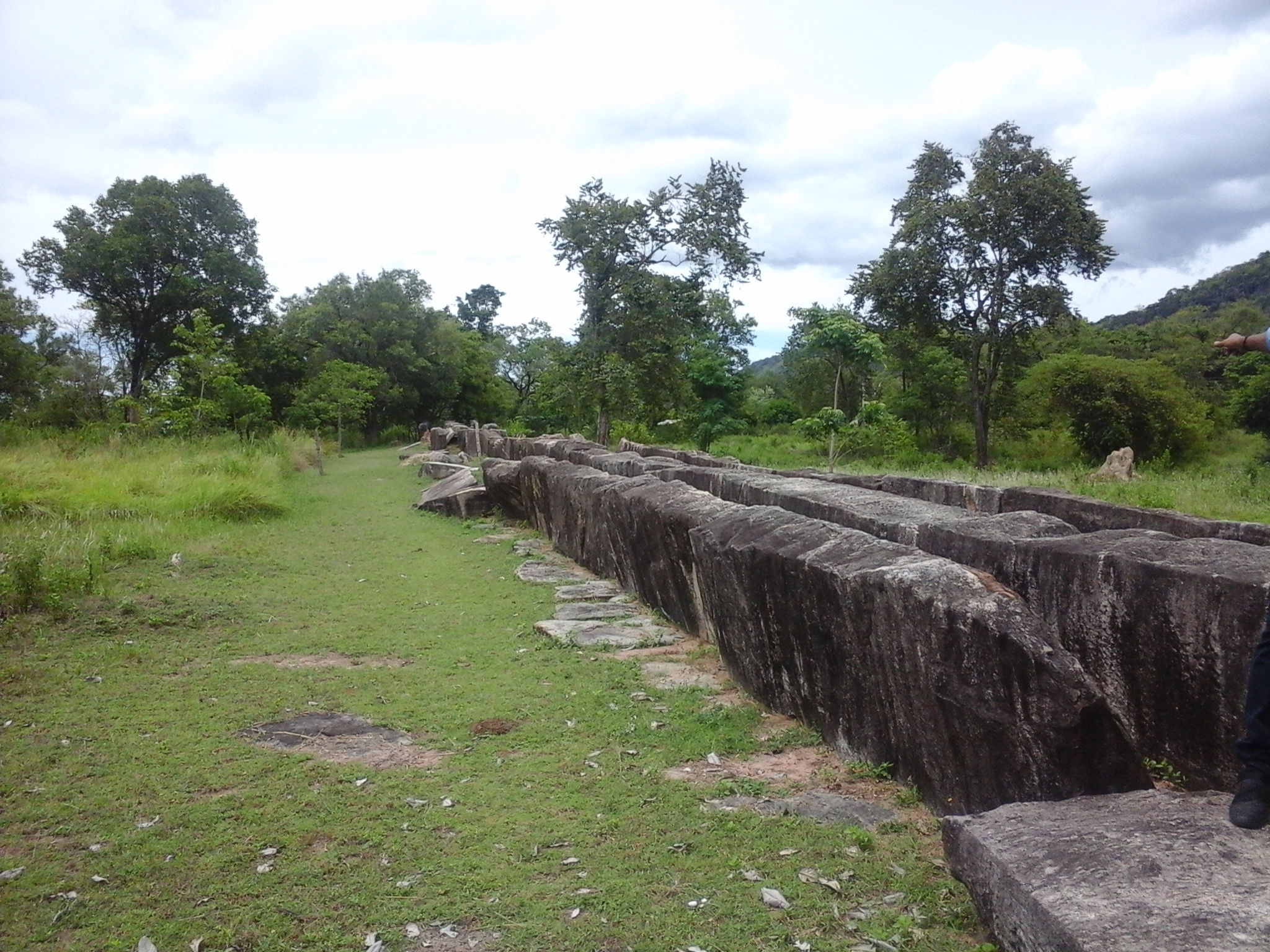
This nearby structure is believed to be made for the sluice gate of the tank

There is a one-mile longed old earthen dam can be seen, near to the newly constructed dam. It was constructed between Gorikanda and Galkanda with rip rap, in high quality. Around 250 feet long dressed stones made to use for the twin Barrel Sluice are still remaining in surrounding. Any way there is no evidence to prove that the construction was completed or the reservoir was functioned.

Near to the old Sluice, a stone slab inscription belonging to 12th – 13th centuries can be seen and which identified as Rambakan Oya Slab Inscription. It describes that the stone canal was built by Liyana Nayakayan and Kanathkan Vahanse, who lived in the Gal Weta area.

=== Recent project ===
The recent project to develop the Rambakan Oya reservoir was commenced on 12 February 2007 and the opening ceremony was held on 20 July 2013 with the participation of then Sri Lanka President Mahinda Rajapaksa and Irrigation and Water Resources Management Minister.

== See also ==
- List of dams and reservoirs in Sri Lanka
