= Rajanganaya Dam =

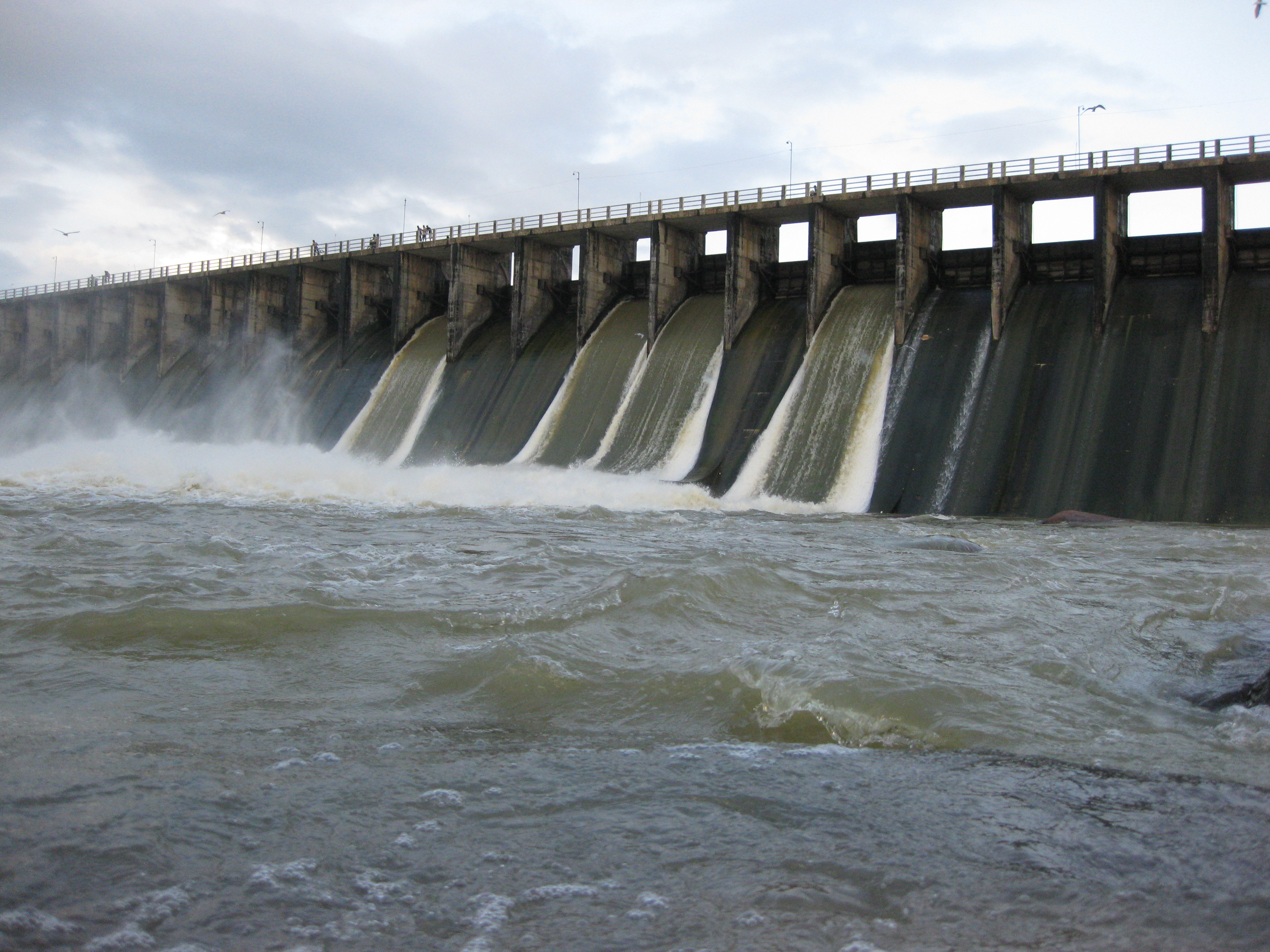
- Interactive map of Rajanganaya Dam
- Country: Sri Lanka
- Location: Rajanganaya
- Coordinates: 08°08′30″N 80°13′23″E
- Purpose: Irrigation
- Status: Operational
- Operator: Ministry of Irrigation

Dam and spillways
- Impounds: Kala Oya
- Length: 350 m (1,150 ft)

Reservoir
- Total capacity: 100.37×10^{6} m^{3} (3,545×10^{6} ft^{3})
- Catchment area: 76,863.60 hectares (189,934.1 acres)

The Rajanganaya Dam (sometimes called Rajangana) is an irrigation dam built across the Kala Oya river, at Rajanganaya, bordering the North Western and North Central provinces of Sri Lanka. The main concrete dam measures approximately 350 m (1,150 ft) and creates the Rajanganaya Reservoir, which has a catchment area of 76,863.60 hectares (189,934.1 acres) and a total storage capacity of 100.37 million cubic metres (3,545×10^{6} ft^{3}).

== See also ==
- List of dams and reservoirs in Sri Lanka
