= Inginimitiya Dam =

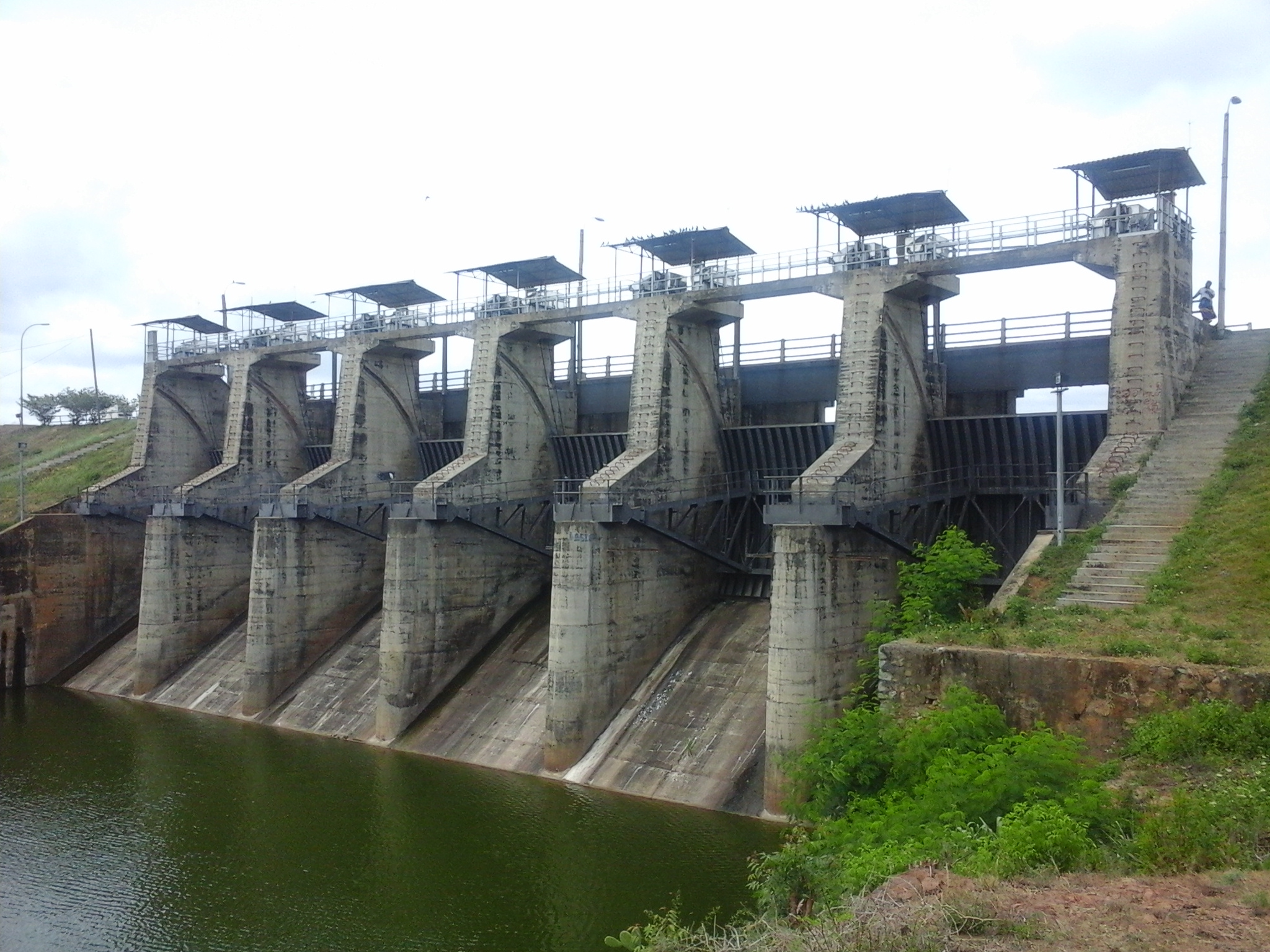
- Spillway section of the Inginimitiya Dam

- Location within Sri Lanka
- Country: Sri Lanka
- Location: Inginimitiya
- Coordinates: 07°56′40″N 80°07′54″E
- Purpose: Irrigation
- Status: Operational
- Construction began: 14 March 1981
- Opening date: 25 March 1985
- Owner: Ministry of Irrigation

Dam and spillways
- Impounds: Mi Oya
- Height: 18 m (59 ft)
- Length: 4,880 m (16,010 ft)
- Spillways: 6
- Spillway capacity: 1,685 m^{3}/s (59,500 cu ft/s)

Reservoir
- Creates: Inginimitiya Reservoir
- Total capacity: 72,600,000 m^{3} (2.56×10^{9} cu ft)
- Active capacity: 66,500,000 m^{3} (2.35×10^{9} cu ft)
- Inactive capacity: 61,000,000 m^{3} (2.2×10^{9} cu ft)
- Catchment area: 388 km^{2} (149.8 mi^{2})

The Inginimitiya Dam (Sinhalese: ඉඟිණිමිටිය ජලාශය) is an embankment dam built across the Mi Oya, at Inginimitiya, Sri Lanka. Measuring 4,880 m (16,010 ft) wide and 18 m (59 ft) tall, the dam creates the popular Inginimitiya Reservoir, which is primarily used for irrigation purposes.

== Reservoir ==
The reservoir facilitates supply of water to 6539 acres land for agriculture, including new land area of about 4600 acres. The idea for making reservoir in Inginimitiya has been proposed for the first time in Rajya manthrana sabha before 75 years ago in 1930s. But the construction of reservoir was commenced on 14 March 1981 and declared opened on 25 March 1985 by then Sri Lanka President J. R. Jayawardene. Overall project scheme was funded as loan aids by Japan and it is Yen 1800 Millions. Apart this Sri Lanka government has been received Rupees 89,000,000 as local funds.

== See also ==
- List of dams and reservoirs in Sri Lanka
