= Mahaweli Development programme =

Sri Lankan development programme

The Mahaweli Development program (Sinhala: මහවැලි සංවර්ධන වැඩසටහන) is known as the largest multipurpose national development program in the history of Sri Lanka and is also considered the keystone of the government's development program that was initiated in 1961.

== Purposes of the Programme ==
The main purposes of carrying out the program were the generation of hydroelectric power, controlling flood, making irrigation facilities for dry zone cultivation, settlement of landless and unemployed families by constructing and developing the physical and social infrastructure required for human habitation by using the waters of the Mahaweli River. Increase local agricultural production and create employment opportunities for the people were among the other expected purposes.

== The Master Plan ==
The Master Plan of Mahaweli Development Programme was prepared with the assistance of UNDP and FAO and recommended for stepwise implementation over a period of 30 years. The program, included irrigation development of about 365,000 ha and hydropower development of 470 MW in capacity. For the purpose of identification, the whole development area was divided into projects, referred to as Systems A to M.

=== Initiation and First Phase ===
In 1961 the Sirimavo Bandaranaike government of Ceylon requested assistance from the Special Fund of the United Nations to survey the Mahaweli Ganga Basin and the Dry Zone areas. The funding was approved and the project operation started in 1964. The survey was carried out in two stages: in the first stage between 1965 and 1967 a field investigation of the entire project area with the aim of developing an outline for a Master Plan for the full development of the water resources for irrigation and hydropower was performed; in the second stage between 1967 and 1968 all the three phases of development for the entire scheme were identified, additional investigations were made of the areas selected for the three projects to be included in the first phase of development and detailed designs were prepared. Execution of the project one of the first phases, which included Polgolla headwork, commended in 1970.

The first phase of the program consisted of diversion headworks at Polgolla and Bowatenna, 40 MW hydropower plant at Ukuwela and an improved water supply to about 52,700 ha of existing irrigated land. Phase one was completed in 1976.

=== Accelerated Mahaweli Programme ===
The step-wise implementation of the Mahaweli Development Programme would have lasted about 30 years from 1975. However, the newly appointed J. R. Jayewardene government in 1977 decided to speed up the program and complete it within its term of office of 6 years. According to that the Accelerated Mahaweli Programme (AMP) was implemented with a revision of the Master Plan in 1977. Which was consist of 12 projects and mainly confined to four head works in the initial works of the program, including the construction of Kotmale, Victoria, Maduru Oya, Randenigala dams and the downstream development of about 60,000 ha in Systems B and C and the Minipe anicut, the Right Bank Trans basin Canal and the Ulhitiya and Ratkinda reservoirs. To implement the project plan in the balance areas proposed by the Master plan and also Gazetted areas, the Mahaweli Authority of Sri Lanka was established in 1979 by an Act of Parliament with a mandate.

By the end of 1995, all the headworks of the AMP had been completed and were functioning. Feasibility studies were scheduled to be completed in respect of the proposed Moragahakanda Project.

== Completed Projects ==
Name	Image	Location	Year commenced	Year completed	Type of Dam	Storage capacity (million cu.m)	Power capacity (MW)	Notes
Bowatenne		07°40′00″N 80°40′00″E	1972	1976	Concrete Gravity	56	40	
Kotmale		07°03′39″N 80°35′50″E	1979	1985	Gravity	174	200	The reservoir was constructed under the Accelerated Mahaweli Programme
Maduru Oya		07°38′53″N 81°12′50″E	1979	1986	Gravity	596	25	The reservoir was constructed under the Accelerated Mahaweli Programme
Polgolla Barrage		07°23′56″N 80°39′08″E	1970	1976	Barrage	4.1	40	The reservoir was constructed under the first project of Polgolla Diversion Complex
Randenigala		07°12′00″N 80°55′30″E	1982	1986	Gravity	860	135	The reservoir was constructed under the Accelerated Mahaweli Programme
Rantambe		07°12′00″N 80°57′00″E	1987	1990	Gravity	21	52	The reservoir was constructed under the Accelerated Mahaweli Programme
Victoria		07°14′29″N 80°47′05″E	1978	1985	Arch	730	210	The reservoir was constructed under the Accelerated Mahaweli Programme
Moragahakanda		07°41′56″N 80°46′12″E	2007	2018	Gravity	521	25	The reservoir is the last project of the five great reservoirs in the Mahaweli Master Plan

== See also ==
- Gal Oya Valley Development Programme
- Ministry of Mahaweli Development and Environment
