= Samantha Vidyaratna =

Plantation Minister of Sri Lanka since 2024

Hon. Samantha Vidyaratna MP
- සමන්ත විද්‍යාරත්න சமந்தா வித்யாரத்னா

Minister of Plantation and Community Infrastructure
- Incumbent
- Assumed office 18 November 2024
- President: Anura Kumara Dissanayake
- Prime Minister: Harini Amarasuriya
- Preceded by: Anura Kumara Dissanayake

Member of Parliament for Badulla District
- Incumbent
- Assumed office 21 November 2024
- Majority: 208,247 preferential votes
- In office 2004–2010

Personal details
- Born: Badulla
- Party: Janatha Vimukthi Peramuna
- Other political affiliations: National People's Power
- Education: University of Kelaniya

Samantha Vidyaratna (or K.V.Samantha Vidyaratne) is a Sri Lankan politician and a member of the Parliament of Sri Lanka who has served as the Minister of Plantation and Community Infrastructure since November 2024. A member of National People's Power and Janatha Vimukthi Peramuna, he was elected as a Member of Parliament for Badulla Electoral District in 2024 Sri Lankan parliamentary election. He was formerly member of the parliament for Anuradhapura District from 2004 to 2010. He fought over the Uma Oya issue and the transfer of 65,000 acres of land to a Singaporean company.

== Biography ==
Lives in Ridimaliyadda, Badulla. He is a graduate of the University of Kelaniya. In 2004, is appointed deputy minister by President Chandrika Kumaratunga. Despite his MP position, he lived for 6 years in a house without electricity. In April 2015, he publicly criticized the Uma Oya Hydropower Complex and the heavy ecologic catastrophy it resulted in for the Uma Oya region. He is fighting against the forcible acquisition of lands in Uva Wellassa by a Singaporean company in the year 2022.

As Plantation and Community Infrastructure minister he claimed he was actively blocking foreign investments in coconut related industries stating that foreign companies are introducing new and efficient technologies to Sri Lanka and paying coconut farmers more forcing less efficient local companies to compete with them.
