= Gunasena (name) =

Gunasena is a given name and surname. Notable people with the name include:

- Gunasena (850–900), Indian monk
- Gunasena de Soyza (1902–1961), Sri Lankan civil servant
- Gunasena Galappatty (born 1927), Sri Lankan dramatist
- Prasanna Gunasena (fl. 2011), Sri Lankan neurosurgeon
- Don Gunasena Athukorala (1924–2024), Sri Lankan civil engineer
