= List of dams and reservoirs in Sri Lanka =

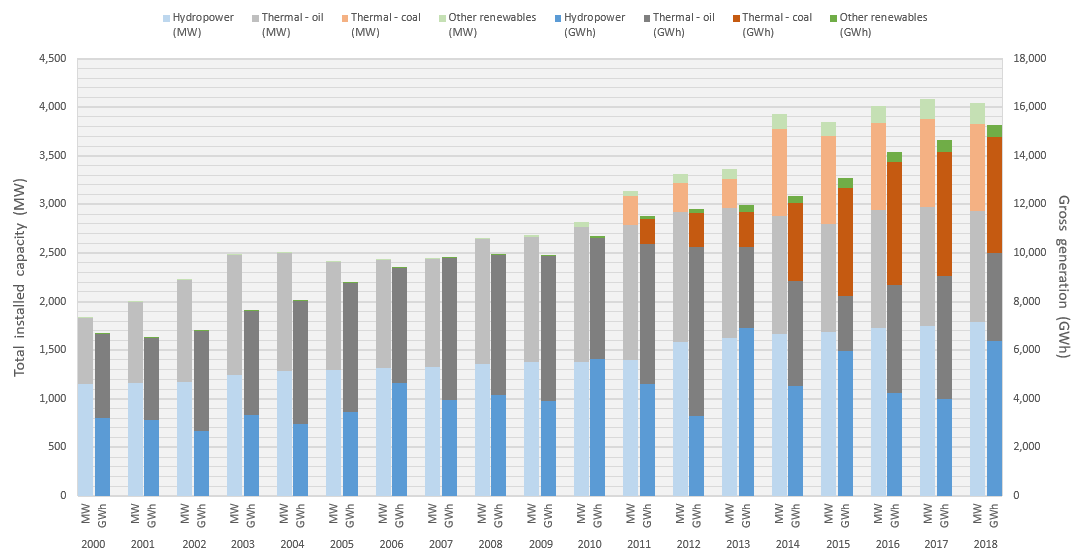
Hydroelectricity accounts for nearly half of the installed power capacity of Sri Lanka.

The following page lists most dams in Sri Lanka. Most of these dams are governed by the Mahaweli Authority, while the Ceylon Electricity Board operates dams used for hydroelectric power generation. Hydroelectric dams, including small hydros, account for nearly half of the installed power capacity of Sri Lanka.

Sri Lanka is pockmarked with many irrigation dams, with its water resource distributed across nearly the entirety of the island for agricultural purposes via artificial canals and streams. Utilization of hydro resources for agricultural production dates back to the pre-Colonial era, with the current crop production now largely dependent on these water resources.

== Dams in Sri Lanka ==
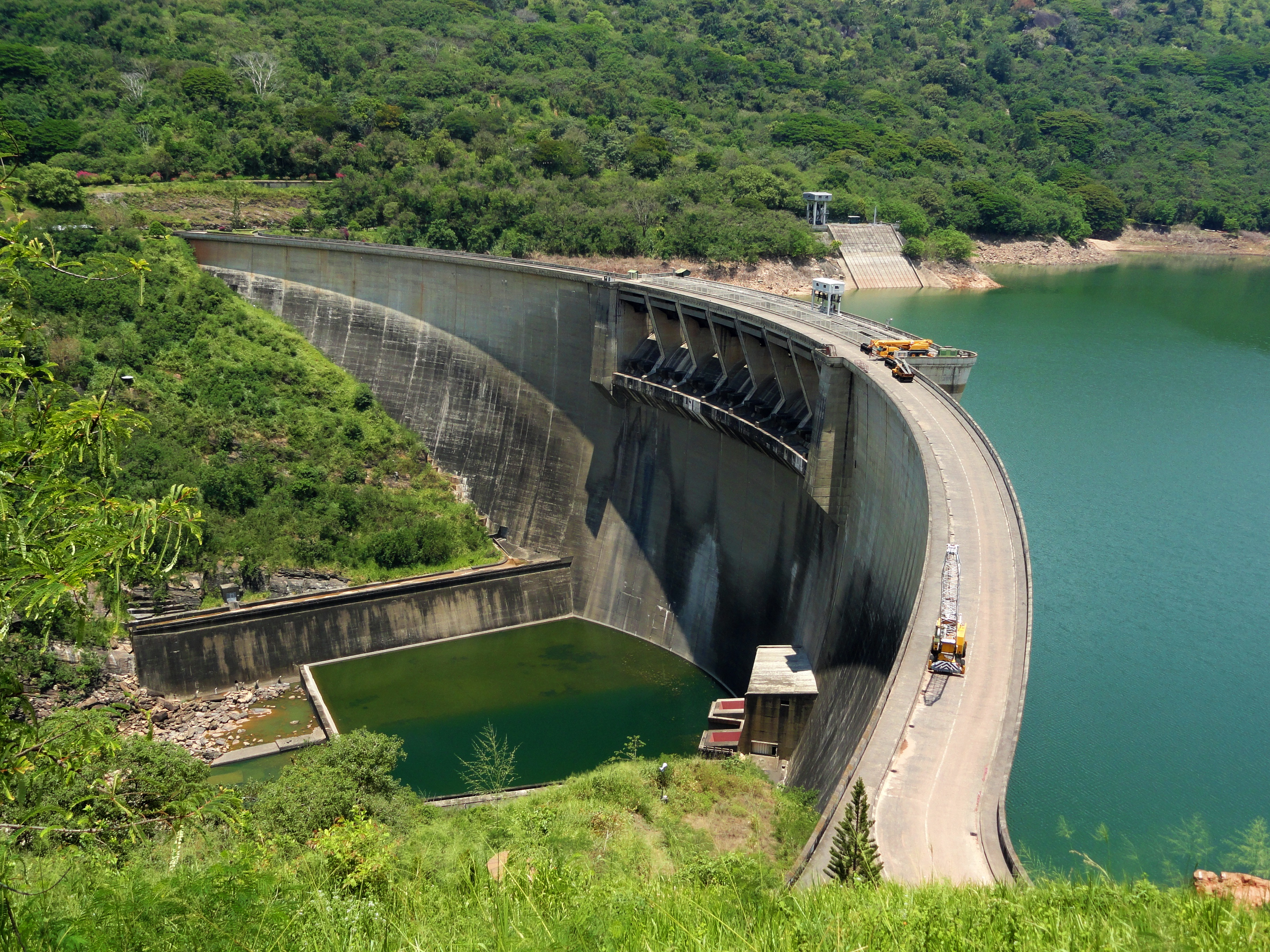
The Victoria Dam on 15 April 2011, three days after its 26th anniversary of opening

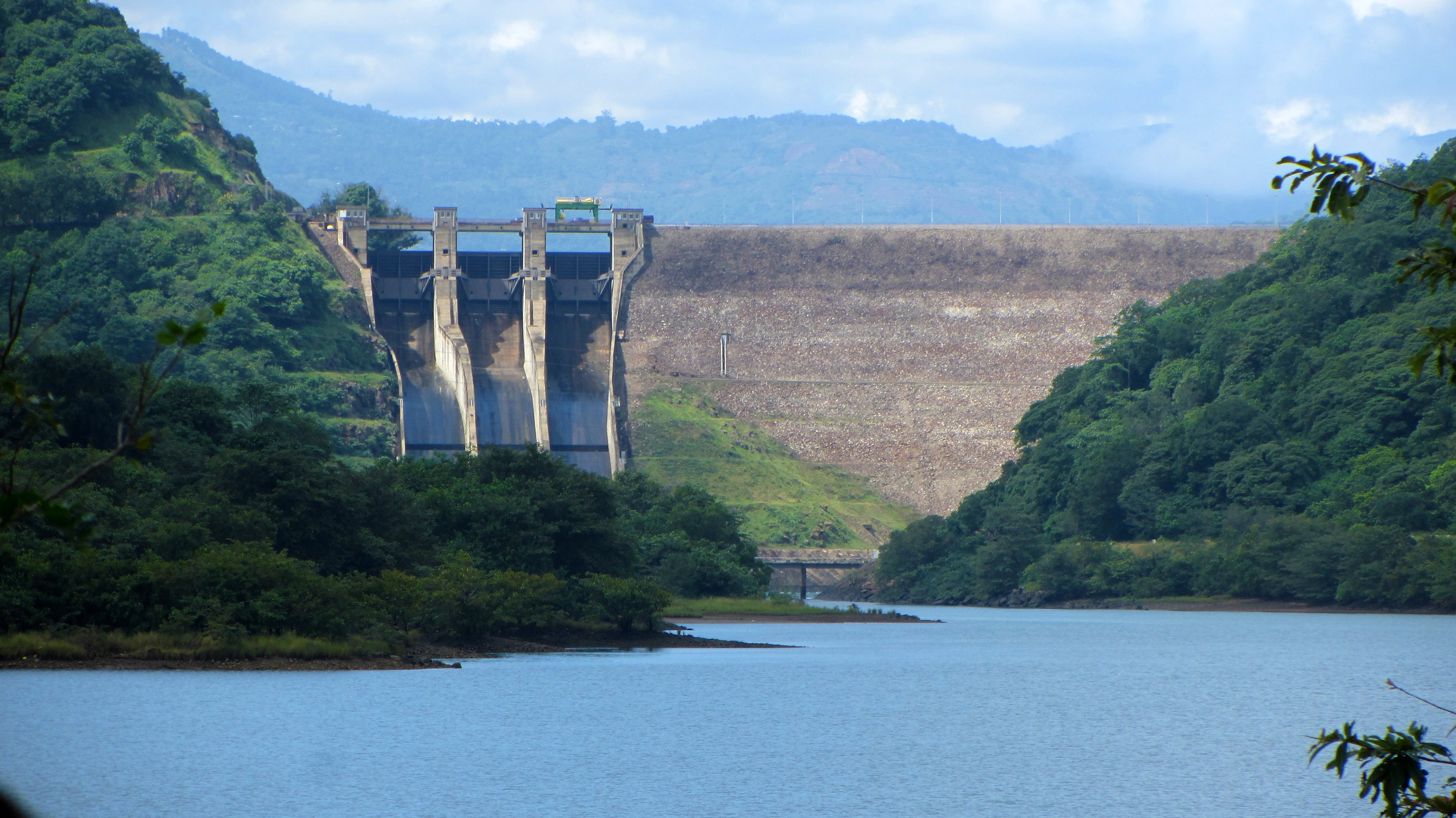
Randenigala Dam in 2013

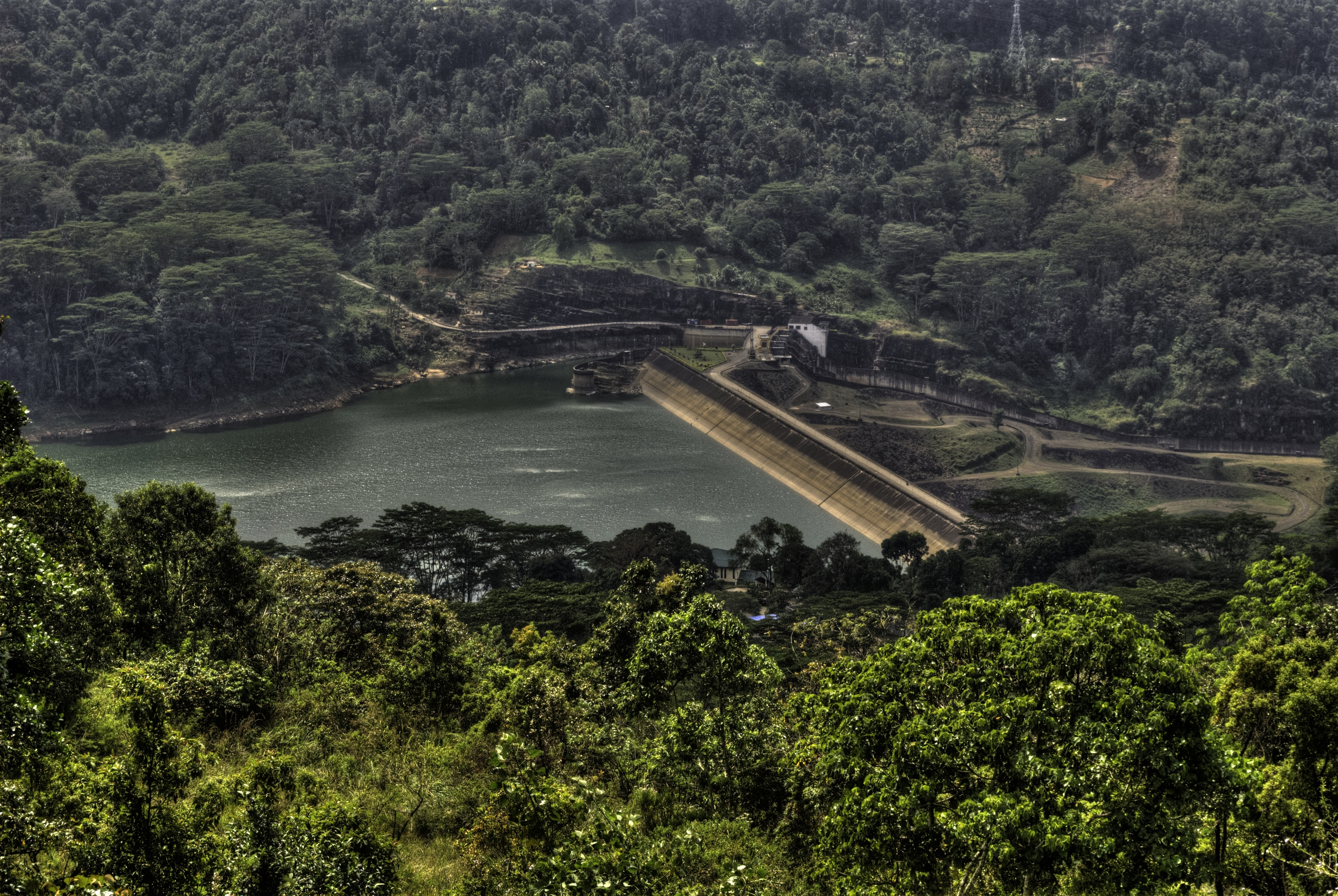
Upstream view of the Kotmale Dam

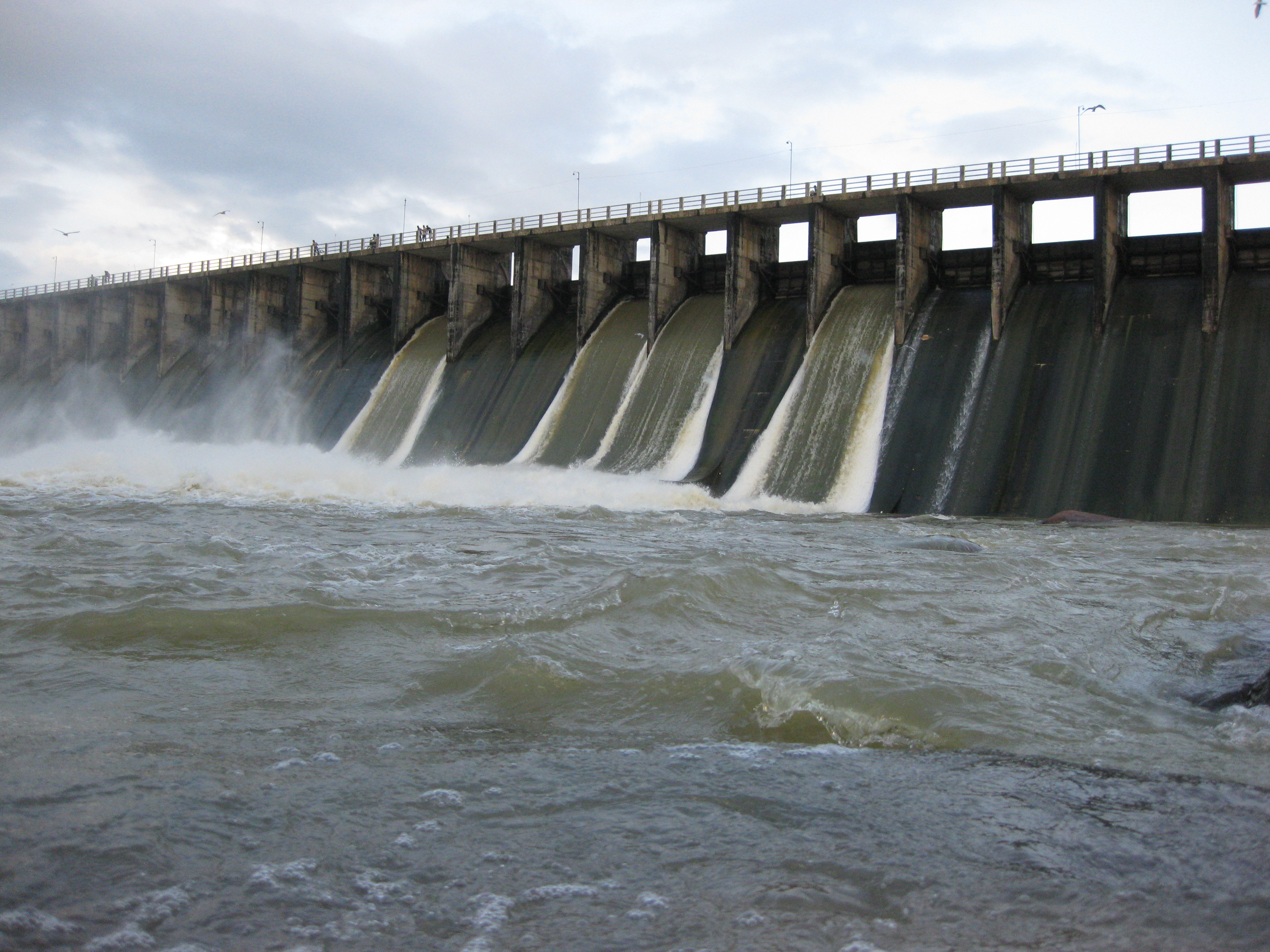
Open spillways of the Rajanganaya Dam

Irrigation dams with a length and height of more than 100 m (330 ft) and 10 m (33 ft) are listed, including all the state-run hydroelectric power stations. Privately owned "small-hydro" facilities (which are limited to a maximum nameplate capacity of 10 MW), are not included in this list. Nearly all hydroelectric dams are also used for providing water resource for irrigation purposes, hence for the sake of identifying the hydroelectric dams, any dam with hydroelectric involvement is stated as such in the below table, even if the primary purpose of building the dam is to retain water for irrigation.

Dam	Location	Purpose	Length (m)	Height (m)	Gen.	Type	Ref
Bowatenna	07°40′00″N 80°40′00″E	Hydroelectricity	226	30	40	Gravity	
Broadlands	06°58′50″N 80°27′09″E	Hydroelectricity	114	24	35	Gravity	
Canyon	06°52′18″N 80°31′34″E	Hydroelectricity			100	Arch-gravity	
Castlereigh	06°52′24″N 80°33′59″E	Hydroelectricity			50	Gravity	
Deduru Oya	07°43′06″N 80°16′28″E	Hydroelectricity	2,400	20	1.5	Embankment	
Dyraaba	06°53′13″N 80°57′23″E	Hydroelectricity	165	50	120	Gravity	
Gal Oya	07°12′37″N 81°32′10″E	Hydroelectricity	1,100	43	12	Embankment	
Inginimitiya	07°56′40″N 80°07′54″E	Irrigation	4,880	18	N/A	Embankment	
Kalu Ganga	07°33′35″N 80°50′09″E	Irrigation	546	67	N/A	Gravity	
Kandalama	07°53′00″N 80°41′40″E	Irrigation	1,600	21	N/A	Embankment	
Kantale	08°21′40″N 80°59′29″E	Irrigation	4,200	15	N/A	Embankment	
Kotmale	07°03′39″N 80°35′50″E	Hydroelectricity	600	87	201	Gravity	
Kukule Ganga	06°34′48″N 80°19′37″E	Hydroelectricity	110	20	80	Gravity	
Laxapana	06°55′08″N 80°29′22″E	Hydroelectricity			75	Gravity	
Lower Malvathu Oya		Irrigation					
Lunugamwehera	06°21′11″N 81°12′09″E	Irrigation			N/A	Embankment	
Maduru Oya	07°38′53″N 81°12′50″E	Irrigation	1,090	41	N/A	Embankment	
Maskeliya	06°50′37″N 80°32′56″E	Hydroelectricity			60	Gravity	
Moragahakanda	07°42′17″N 80°46′59″E	Hydroelectricity		65	25	Gravity	
Moragolla		Hydroelectricity		35	30	Gravity	
Norton	06°54′50″N 80°31′18″E	Hydroelectricity			50	Gravity	
Nilambe	07°11′18″N 80°37′52″E	Hydroelectricity	70		3.2	Gravity	
Polgolla	07°19′18″N 80°38′42″E	Hydroelectricity	144	14.6	40	Gravity	
Puhulpola	06°54′51″N 80°56′00″E	Irrigation	175	45	NA	Gravity	
Rajanganaya	08°08′30″N 80°13′23″E	Irrigation			N/A	Embankment	
Randenigala	07°12′00″N 80°55′30″E	Hydroelectricity	485	94	126	Embankment	
Rambakan Oya	07°33′53″N 81°27′17″E	Irrigation	1225	24.7	N/A	Embankment	
Rantembe	07°12′00″N 80°57′00″E	Hydroelectricity	420	42	52	Gravity	
Ratkinda	07°30′30″N 81°03′24″E	Irrigation	4,960	25	N/A	Embankment	
Samanala	06°40′54″N 80°47′54″E	Hydroelectricity	530	110	124	Embankment	
Udawalawe	06°26′02″N 80°51′15″E	Hydroelectricity	3,900		6	Embankment	
Ulhitiya	07°28′20″N 81°03′17″E	Irrigation			N/A	Embankment	
Upper Kotmale	06°56′48″N 80°39′29″E	Hydroelectricity	180	35	150	Gravity	
Victoria	07°14′29″N 80°47′05″E	Hydroelectricity	520	122	210	Arch	

== See also ==
- Electricity sector in Sri Lanka
- List of power stations in Sri Lanka
- List of rivers of Sri Lanka
