= Athukorala =

Athukorala is a surname. Notable people with the surname include:

- Amarakeerthi Athukorala (1964–2022), Sri Lankan politician
- Chathura Athukorala (born 1984), Sri Lankan cricketer
- Don Gunasena Athukorala (1924–2024), Sri Lankan engineer
- Kapila Athukorala (fl. 2015), Sri Lankan politician
