= Moragalla Tunnel =

Railway tunnel in Sri Lanka

- Interactive map of Moragalla Tunnel

Overview
- Official name: Tunnel No. 9
- Other name: Lion's Mouth (සිoහ කට)
- Location: Moragolla, Sri Lanka
- Coordinates: 7°15′19.5″N 80°30′7.8″E
- Status: Open
- Route: Main Line
- Start: Kadugannawa
- End: Balana

Operation
- Work began: July 1863
- Constructed: F. W. Faviell
- Opened: July 1866
- Owner: Sri Lanka Railways
- Traffic: rail

Technical
- Design engineer: Guilford Lindsey Molesworth
- Length: 334 m (1,096 ft)
- Max elevation: 400 m (1,300 ft)

Moragalla Railway Tunnel or Lion's Mouth Tunnel is the second longest railway tunnel in Sri Lanka.

The tunnel was designed by Sir Guilford Lindsey Molesworth, the first Director-General of Railways in Ceylon (1865–1871) and constructed by F. W. Faviell. It is the last climb of the Kadugannawa Pass, and is considered to be one of the most dangerous and difficult construction projects along the railway line. The tunnel was bored from both ends meeting in the middle. Construction commenced from the Kandy end in July 1863 and the Colombo side in September 1863 and the works were completed on 22 March 1866, with over 7,894 m^{3} (10,325 yd^{3}) of rock excavated. The tunnel is 334 m (1,096 ft) long and contains a double curve.

The tunnel gains its name from the overhanging rock, immediately proceeding the tunnel on the Kadugannawa end, which appears to resemble the open mouth of a roaring lion.
