= Maskeliya Dam =

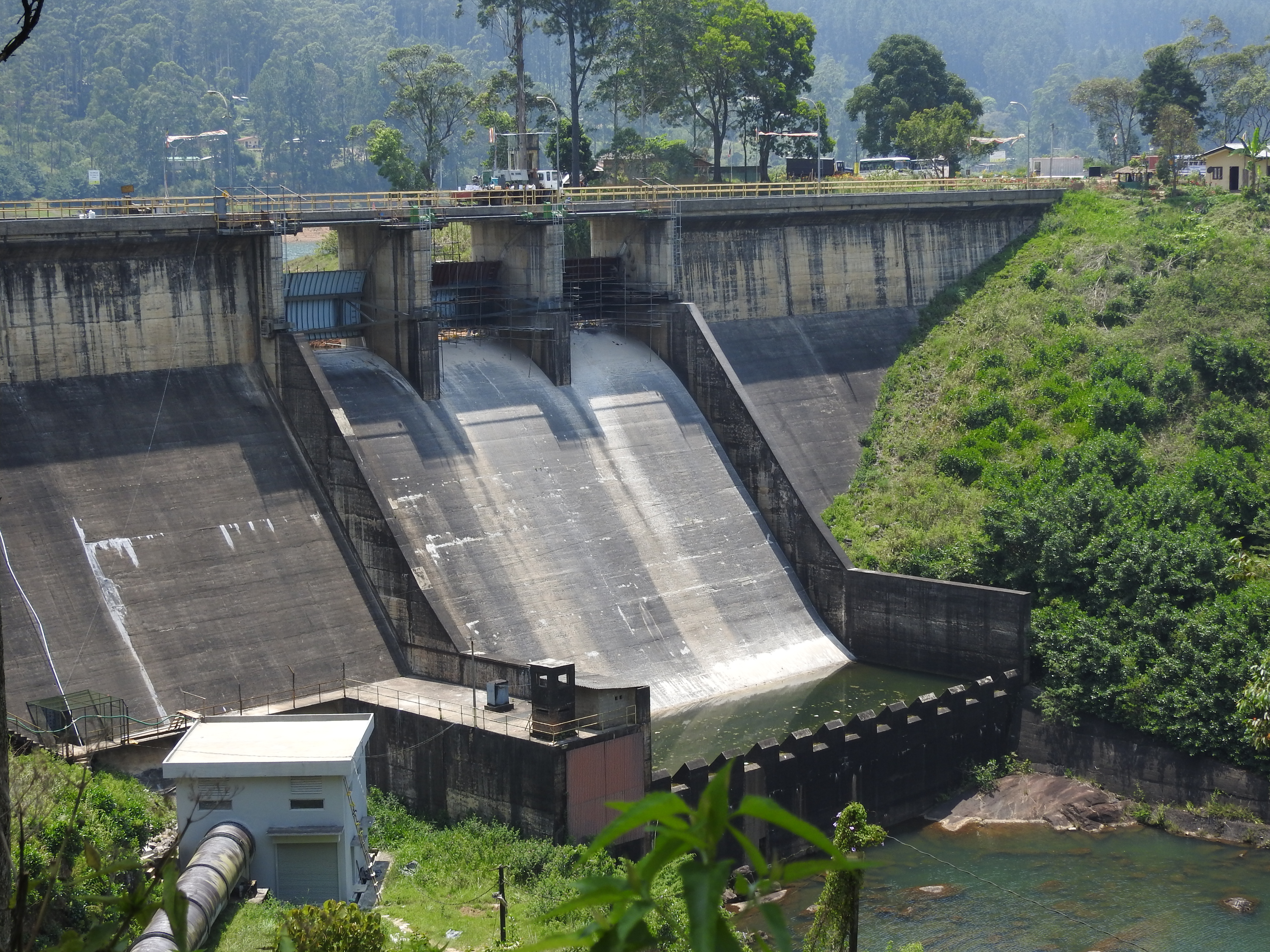

- Location within Sri Lanka
- Country: Sri Lanka
- Location: Maskeliya, Central Province
- Coordinates: 06°50′37″N 80°32′56″E
- Purpose: Power
- Status: Operational
- Opening date: March 1983
- Owner: CEB

Dam and spillways
- Type of dam: Gravity dam
- Impounds: Maskeliya Oya

Canyon Power Station
- Coordinates: 06°52′09″N 80°31′40″E
- Turbines: 2 × 30 MW
- Installed capacity: 60 MW

The Maskeliya Dam (also known as the Maussakelle Dam) is a large gravity dam at Maskeliya, in the Central Province of Sri Lanka. Along with the Castlereigh Dam, the dams are the highest point and beginning of the Laxapana Hydropower Complex, involving a number of dams, penstocks, and hydroelectric power stations. The dam creates the Maskeliya Reservoir over the route of Maskeliya Oya, a major tributary of the Kelani River, which is the 4th longest in the country.

== Power station ==
A 4.2 km (2.6 mi) penstock from the Maskeliya Reservoir, measuring 3 m (10 ft) in diameter, transfers water directly to the Canyon Hydroelectric Power Station, located downstream. The 60-megawatt power station consists of two 30-megawatt units, commissioned in March 1983 and May 1988. Water from the Canyon Power Station is discharged into the Canyon Reservoir, located on the same site.

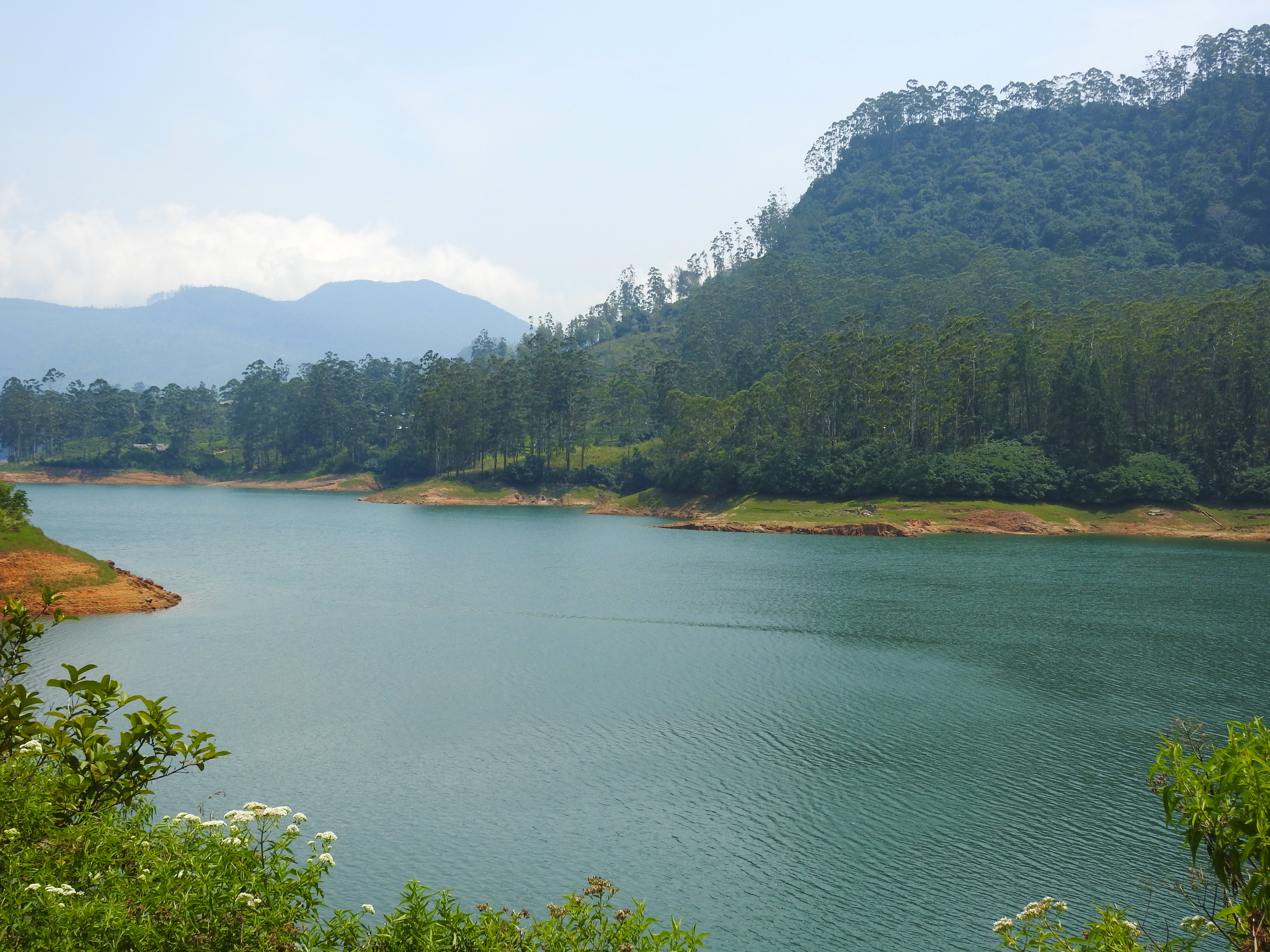
Maskeliya Reservoir, created by the dam.

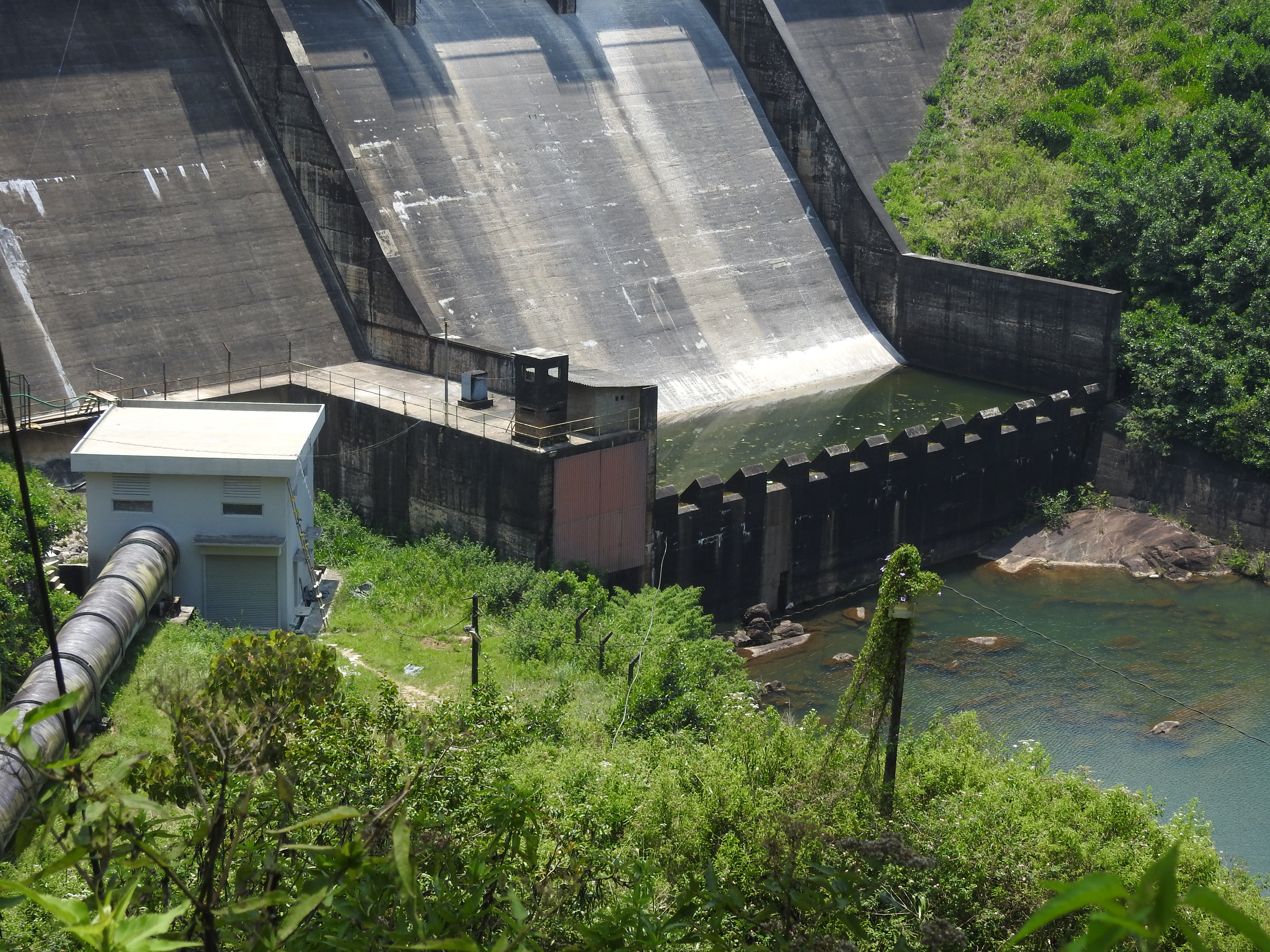
Water from the dam is diverted

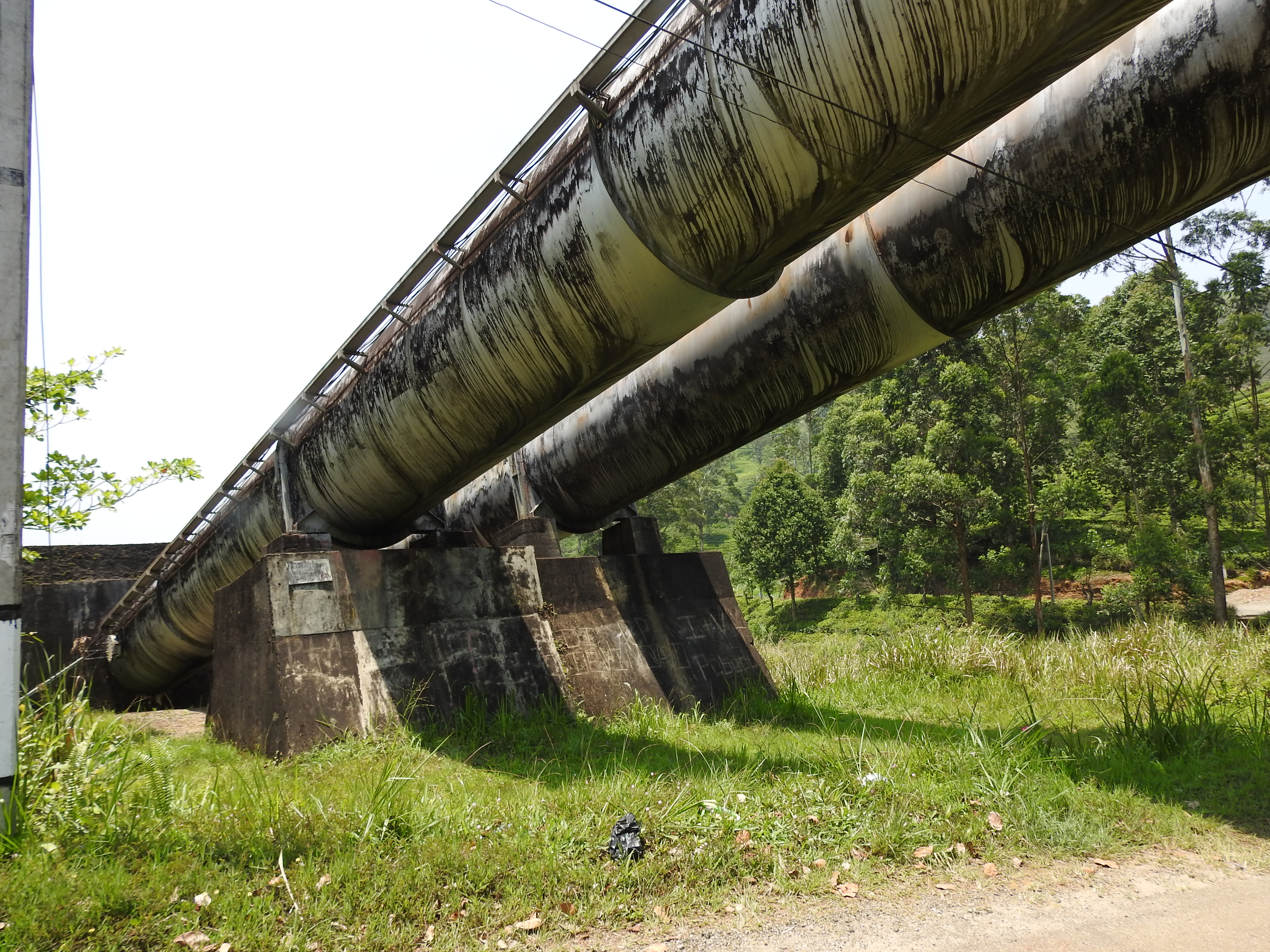
Penstocks channel water from the dam to the power station.

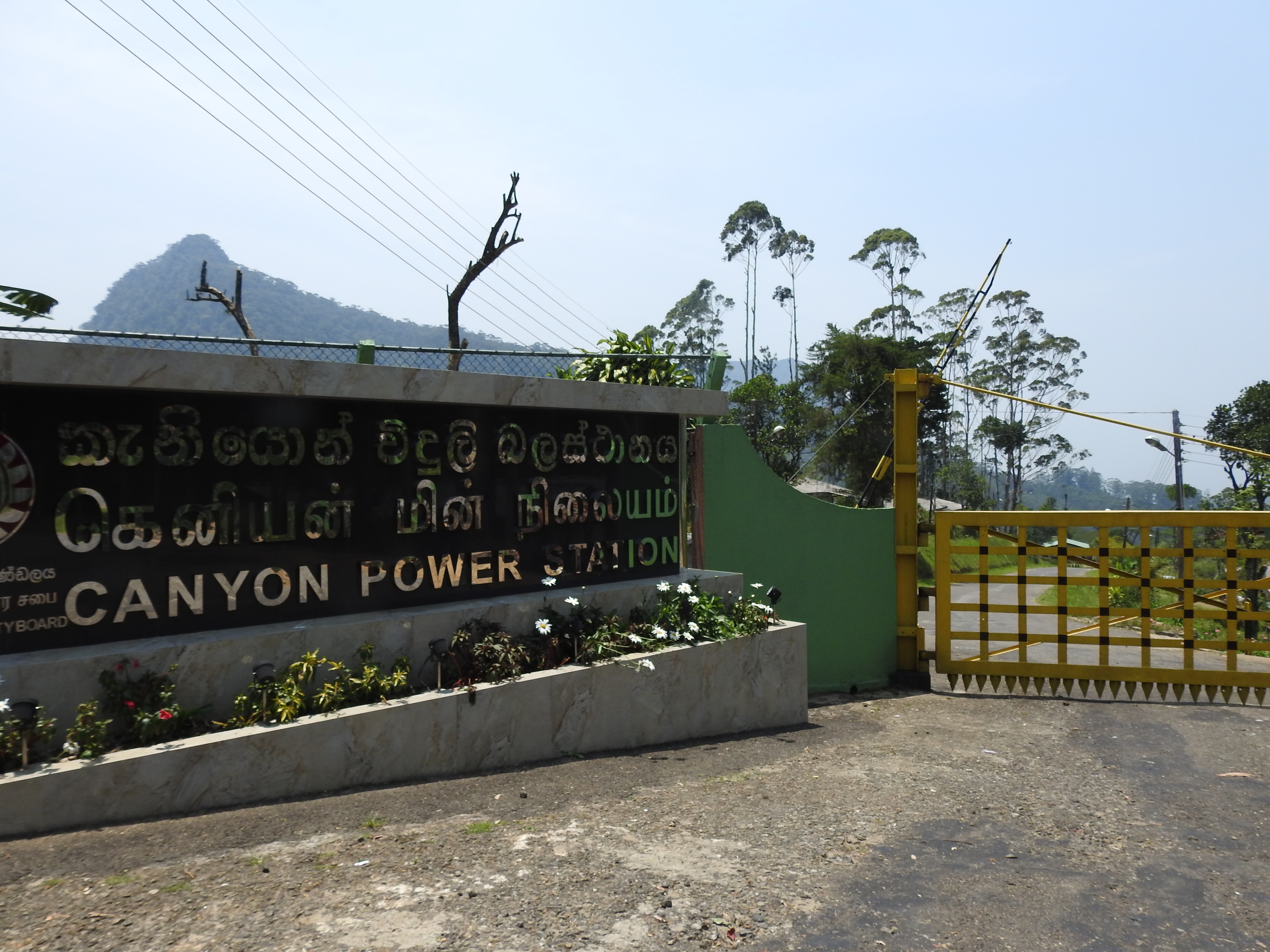
Water pressure is converted to power at the Canyon Power Station.

== See also ==
- List of dams and reservoirs in Sri Lanka
- List of power stations in Sri Lanka
