= Kala Oya =

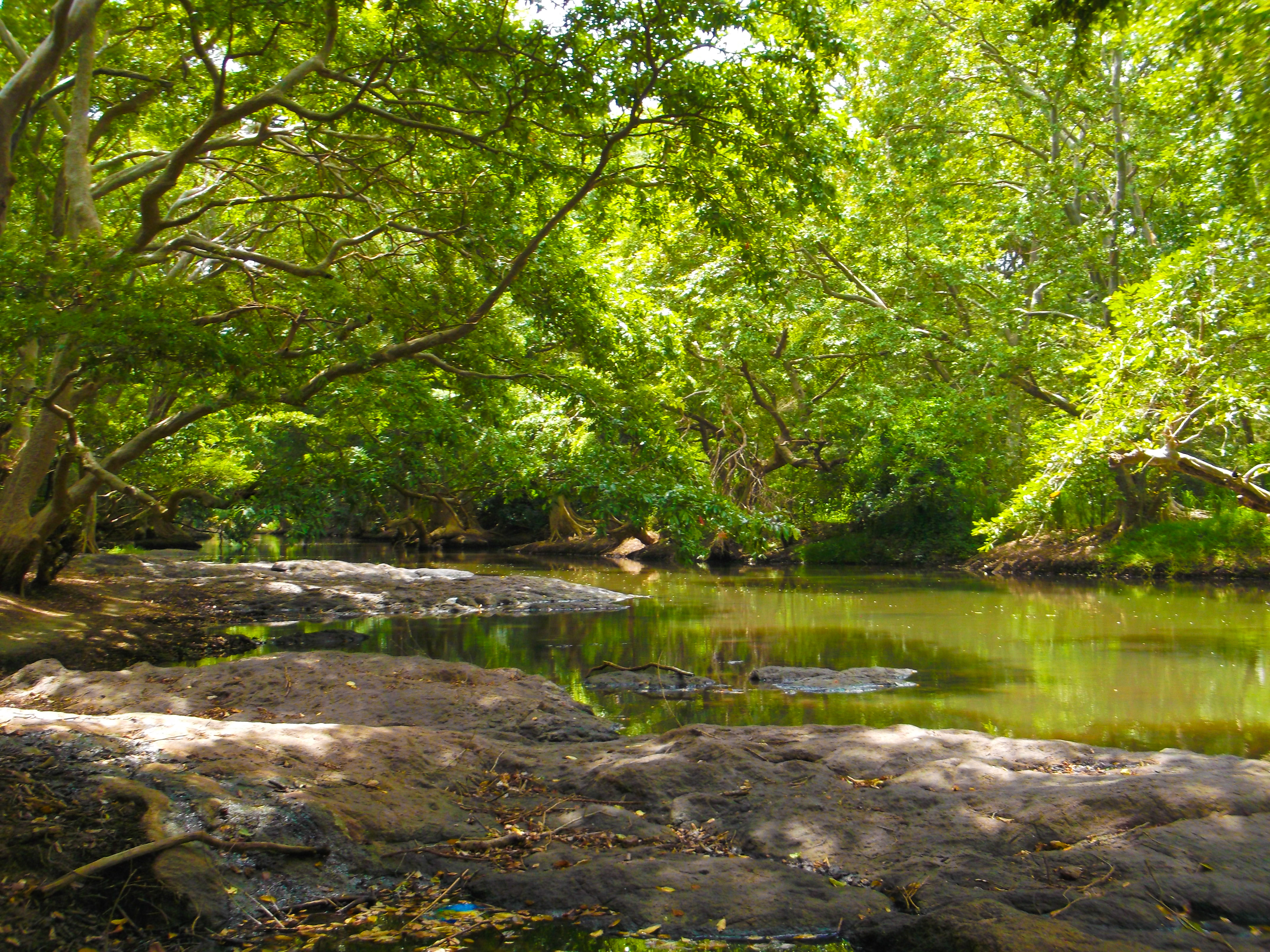

- Location within Sri Lanka

Physical characteristics
- Source
  - location: Dambulla
- Mouth: Palk Strait
  - location: Wilpattu
  - coordinates: 08°17′41″N 79°50′23″E
  - elevation: Sea level
- Length: 148 km (92 mi)
- Basin size: 2,873 km^{2} (1,109 mi^{2})

The Kala Oya is the third longest river in Sri Lanka. The 145 km (90 mi) long river has a basin size of 2,873 km^{2} (1,109 mi^{2}), and more than 400,000 rural population live by the river basin.

Its catchment area receives approximately 3,169 million cubic metres of rain per year, and approximately 5 percent of the water reaches the sea. It has a catchment area of 1,792 square kilometers.

== Tributaries ==
- Dambulu Oya
- Mirisgoni Oya
- Hawanella oya
- Moragolla Oya
- Maninda Oya

== See also ==
- List of dams and reservoirs in Sri Lanka
- List of rivers of Sri Lanka
