= Randenigala Dam =

Dam in Rantembe, Central Province, Sri Lanka

Randenigala Dam රන්දෙනිගල වේල්ල
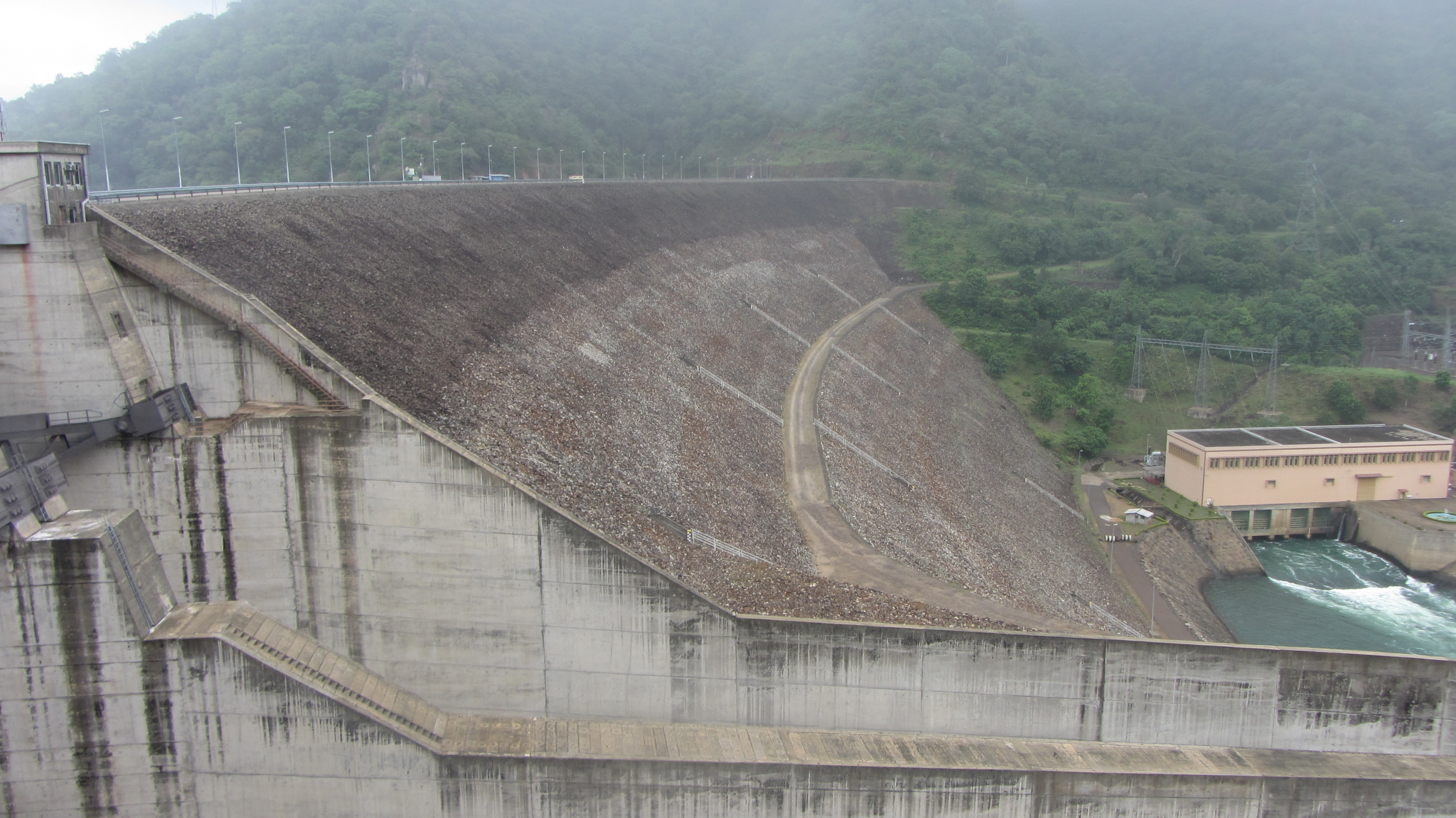
- The Randenigala Dam as seen from the southern bank, with the power station in the background.
- Interactive map of Randenigala Dam රන්දෙනිගල වේල්ල
- Country: Sri Lanka
- Location: Rantembe, Central Province
- Coordinates: 07°12′00″N 80°55′30″E
- Purpose: Power
- Status: Operational
- Construction began: November 1982
- Opening date: 1986
- Construction cost: Rs. 4.898 billion (1986)
- Owner: Mahaweli Authority

Dam and spillways
- Type of dam: Embankment dam
- Impounds: Mahaweli River
- Height (foundation): 94 m (308 ft)
- Length: 485 m (1,591 ft)
- Elevation at crest: 239 m (784 ft)
- Width (crest): 10 m (33 ft)
- Width (base): 303 m (994 ft)
- Spillways: 3
- Spillway type: Tainter gate, chute
- Spillway capacity: 8,100 m^{3}/s (290,000 cu ft/s)

Reservoir
- Creates: Randenigala Reservoir
- Total capacity: 861,000,000 m^{3} (3.04×10^{10} ft^{3})
- Active capacity: 558,000,000 m^{3} (1.97×10^{10} ft^{3})
- Catchment area: 2,330 km^{2} (900 mi^{2})
- Surface area: 1,350 ha (13.5 km^{2})

Power Station
- Operator: CEB
- Turbines: 2 × 63 MW
- Installed capacity: 126 MW
- Annual generation: 428 GWh

The Randenigala Dam (Sinhala: රන්දෙනිගල වේල්ල) is a large hydroelectric embankment dam at Rantembe, in the Central Province of Sri Lanka. Construction of the dam began in November 1982, and was completed in approximately 4 years. The dam and power station was ceremonially opened by then President J. R. Jayawardene in 1986.

Construction of the dam cost approximately Rs. 4.898 billion (1986), of which 24.6% (Rs. 1.207 billion) was funded by the local government, and the majority of the remainder by Germany.

== Dam ==
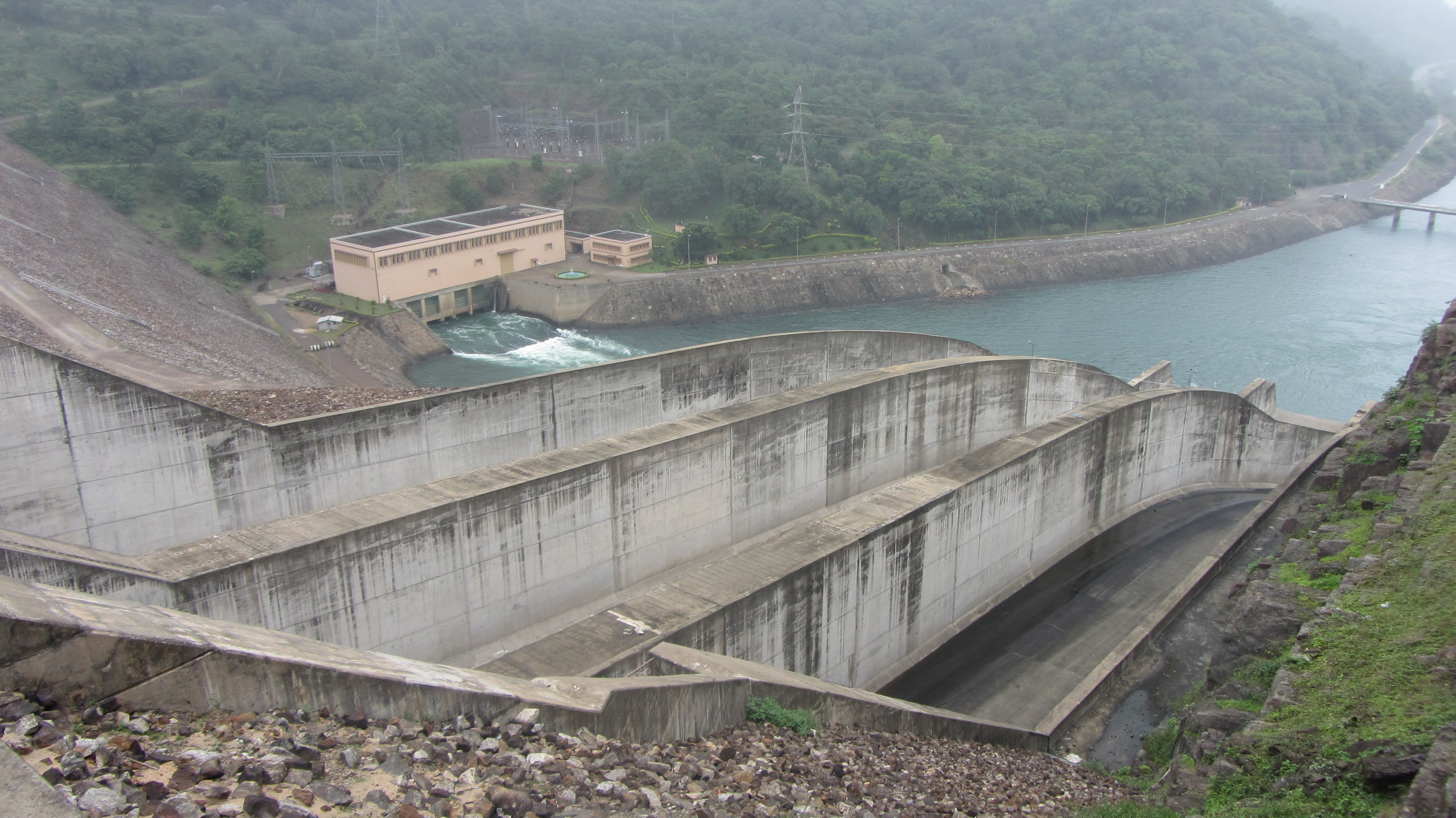
The three large spillways of the dam.

The Randenigala Dam is located 19 km (11.8 mi) downstream of the Victoria Dam, and 2.8 km (1.7 mi) upstream of the Rantembe Dam. Randenigala measures 94 m (308 ft) in height, 485 m (1,591 ft) in length, with a crest and base width of 10 m (33 ft) and 303 m (994 ft) respectively. The embankment dam is made mostly of rocks, and consists of a clay core.

Three large controlled tainter gate chute spillways, with a combined discharge volume of 8,100 m^{3}/s (290,000 cu ft/s), are constructed at the southern end of the dam. The three spillways measure 270 m (886 ft) in length, with a combined width of 48 m (157 ft).

== Reservoir ==
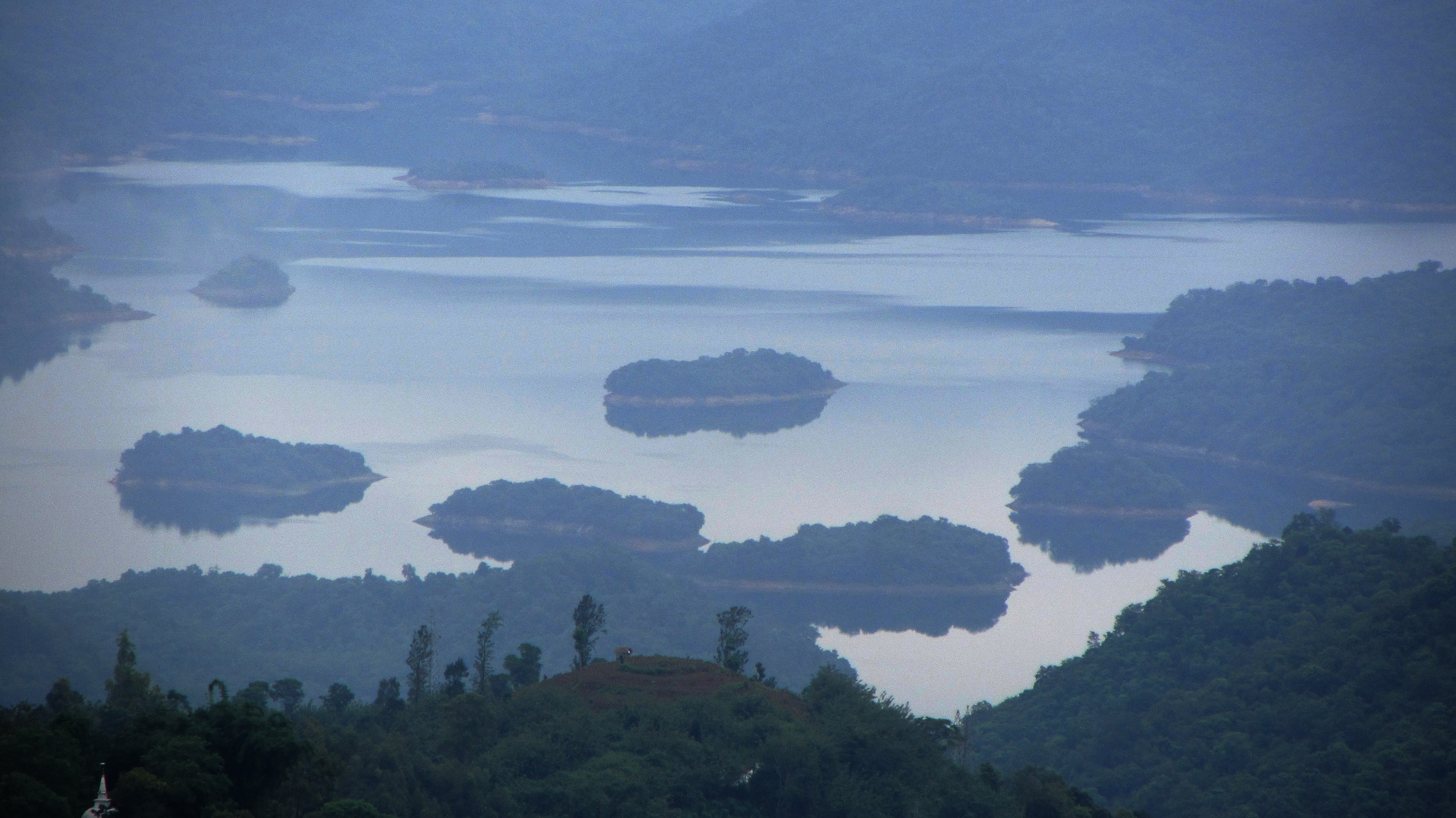
The reservoir, as seen from 13km away in Harasbedda.

The dam creates the Randenigala Reservoir. With a catchment area of 2,330 km (1,450 mi) and a total storage capacity of 861,000,000 m^{3} (3.04×10^{10} ft^{3}), Randenigala is one of the largest reservoirs in the country.

The reservoir experiences approximately 1,250–3,000 mm (49.21–118.11 in) of rainfall annually. In addition to this, the reservoir is also topped up with water from the Victoria Reservoir upstream, and the Mahaweli River.

== Power station ==
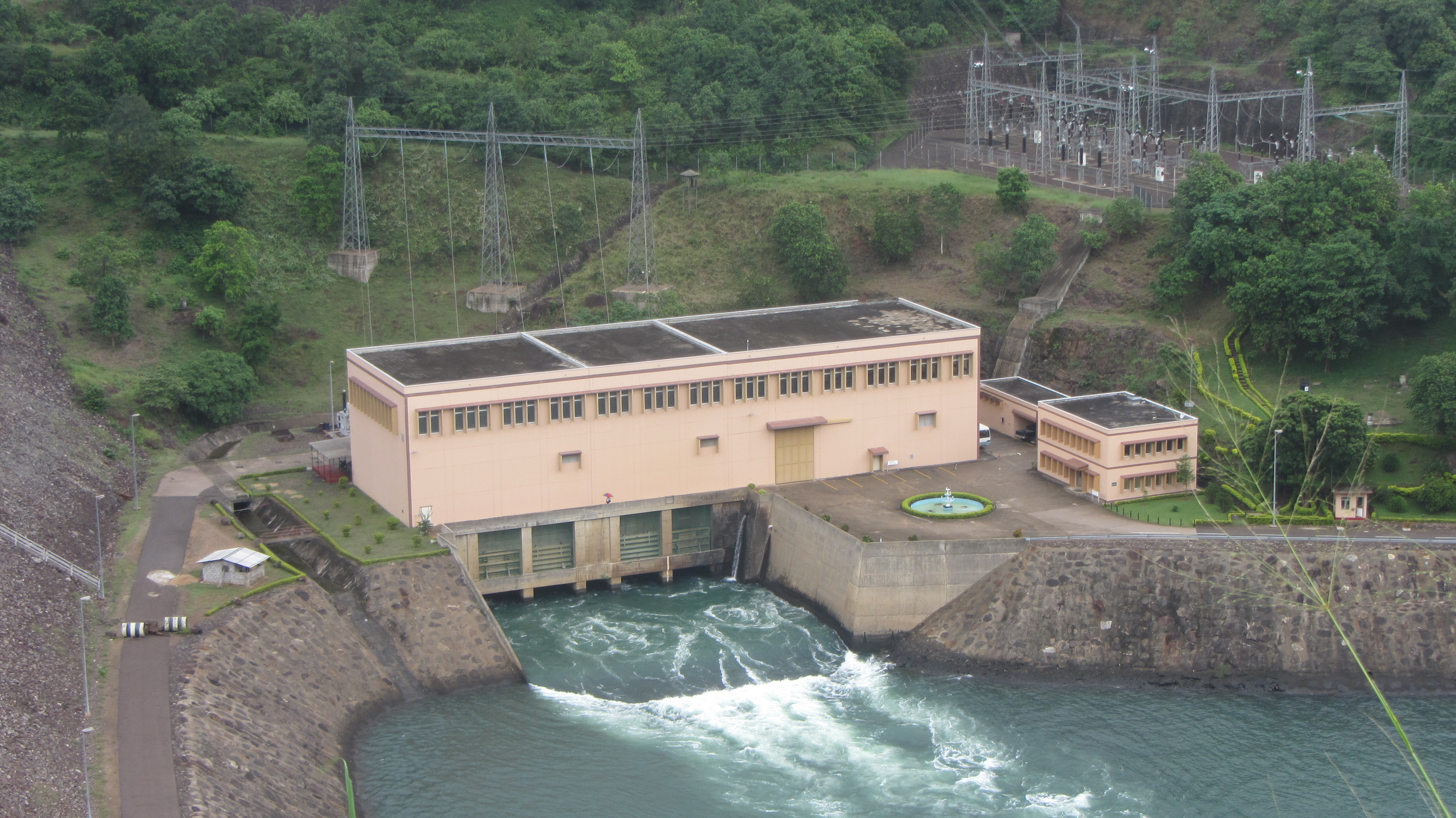
The power station of the Randenigala Dam.

The power station is located immediately downstream of the dam, on the left bank. Water from the reservoir is delivered to the power station via a single steel-lined tunnel with a length and diameter of 270 m (886 ft) and 6.2 m (20.3 ft) respectively.

The plant consists of two generators with a rated capacity of 63 MW each, powered by two francis turbines. The units were commissioned in August and September 1986 respectively. At a combined capacity of 126 MW, the plant generates 428 GWh annually.

== See also ==
- List of dams and reservoirs in Sri Lanka
- List of power stations in Sri Lanka
