= Moragolla =

- Village
- Country: Sri Lanka
- Province: Central Province
- Time zone: UTC+5:30 (Sri Lanka Standard Time)

Moragolla is a village in Sri Lanka. It is located within Central Province.

== Energy ==
Moragolla Dam is the last major Hydro Power Plant in Mahaweli Ganga Hydro Power Scheme. The project site is located on the upper reaches of the Mahaweli Ganga in the Central Highlands, approximately 22 km south of Kandy City close to the village of Ulapane in the Kandy district and about 130 km North-East of Colombo. It is claimed to be eventually capable of generating approximately 85 GWh annually.

== See also ==
- List of towns in Central Province, Sri Lanka
- Moragolla Dam
