= Mi Oya =

- Location within Sri Lanka

Physical characteristics
- Source
  - location: Saliyagama
- Mouth
  - location: Puttalam
  - coordinates: 08°05′44″N 79°48′37″E
  - elevation: Sea level
- Length: 109 km (68 mi)
- Discharge
  - maximum: 37 10^{6} Sq.m

The Mi Oya is a 108 km (67 mi) long river, in Sri Lanka. It is the fifteenth-longest river in the country. It begins in Saliyagama and flows northwest, emptying into the Indian Ocean through Puttalam.

Its catchment area receives approximately 1,596 million cubic metres of rain per year, and approximately 3 percent of the water reaches the sea. It has a catchment area of 1,024 square kilometres.
