= Moragolla Dam =

- Country: Sri Lanka
- Location: Moragolla
- Purpose: Hydroelectricity
- Status: Planned
- Opening date: 2021
- Owner: Mahaweli Authority

Dam and spillways
- Type of dam: Gravity dam
- Impounds: Mahaweli River
- Height (foundation): 35 m (115 ft)
- Spillways: 5

Reservoir
- Creates: Moragolla Reservoir
- Total capacity: 1,980,000 m^{3} (70,000,000 ft^{3})

Moragolla Power Station
- Operator: Ceylon Electricity Board
- Type: Conventional
- Turbines: 2 × 15 MW
- Installed capacity: 30 MW
- Annual generation: 85 GWh

The Moragolla Dam is a planned hydroelectric dam in Moragolla, Sri Lanka. The dam is to be 35 m (115 ft) high and is planned to create the 1,980,000 m^{3} (70,000,000 ft^{3}) Moragolla Reservoir with a maximum supply level at 548 m (1,798 ft) MSL. Upon completion, the Moragolla Power Station would have a gross installed capacity of 30 megawatts from two francis turbines.

Preliminary assessments and feasibility studies of the hydroelectric dam and power station began on 24 September 2012. The dam is planned to impound the Mahaweli River at Weliganga and have five spillways, with the powerhouse located approximately 500 m (1,600 ft) from the tailrace discharge of the Kotmale Power Station.

== Environmental impact ==
The construction of the Moragolla Dam and underground penstocks posed significant threats to the endangered green labeo fish species in the project site.

== Energy ==
The project site is located on the upper reaches of the Mahaweli Ganga in the Central Highlands.

== See also ==
- List of power stations in Sri Lanka
