= Polgolla Barrage =

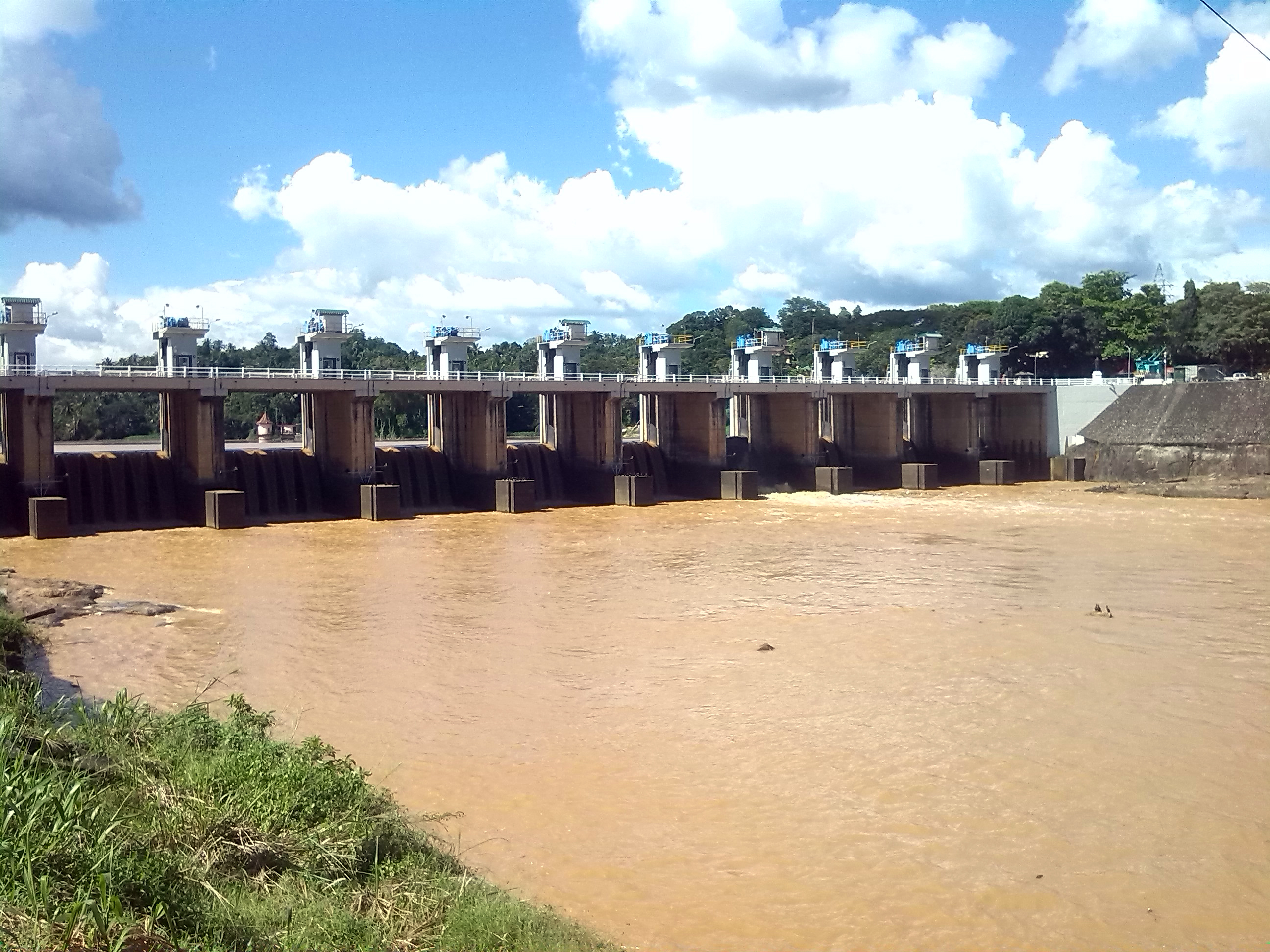
- Polgolla barrage as seen from the downstream when the Victoria reservoir has reached full capacity and has inundated a portion of the barrage.

- Location within Sri Lanka
- Official name: පොල්ගොල්ල හැරවුම් වේල්ල
- Country: Sri Lanka
- Location: Polgolla, Central Province
- Coordinates: 07°19′18″N 80°38′42″E
- Purpose: Power
- Status: Operational
- Opening date: July 1976
- Owner: Mahaweli Authority

Dam and spillways
- Type of dam: Barrage
- Impounds: Mahaweli River
- Height (foundation): 14.6 m (48 ft)
- Length: 144 m (472 ft)
- Spillways: 10
- Spillway type: Slide gates

Reservoir
- Creates: Polgolla Reservoir
- Total capacity: 4,100,000 m^{3} (140,000,000 ft^{3})
- Active capacity: 2,100,000 m^{3} (74,000,000 ft^{3})
- Maximum length: 1,200 m (3,900 ft)
- Maximum width: 170 m (560 ft)

Ukuwela Power Station
- Coordinates: 07°23′56″N 80°39′08″E
- Operator: Ceylon Electricity Board
- Turbines: 2 × 20 MW
- Installed capacity: 40 MW
- Website http://www.mahawelicomplex.lk/Poldam.html

The Polgolla Barrage (also erroneously known as the Polgolla Dam) is a barrage built across the Mahaweli River at Polgolla, in the Central Province of Sri Lanka. The main purpose of the barrage is to maintain the water level of Mahaweli river at a constant height to provide a uniform potential head at the intake to the underground tunnel which conveys water to Ukuwela powerplant.

The barrage is situated at the upstream edge of the Victoria reservoir, where half of the downstream side of the barrage submerge in the Victoria reservoir when it reaches full capacity. Inundation of the barrage itself reaches the downstream edge of Warathenna - Hakkinda Environmental Protection Area.

== Power station ==
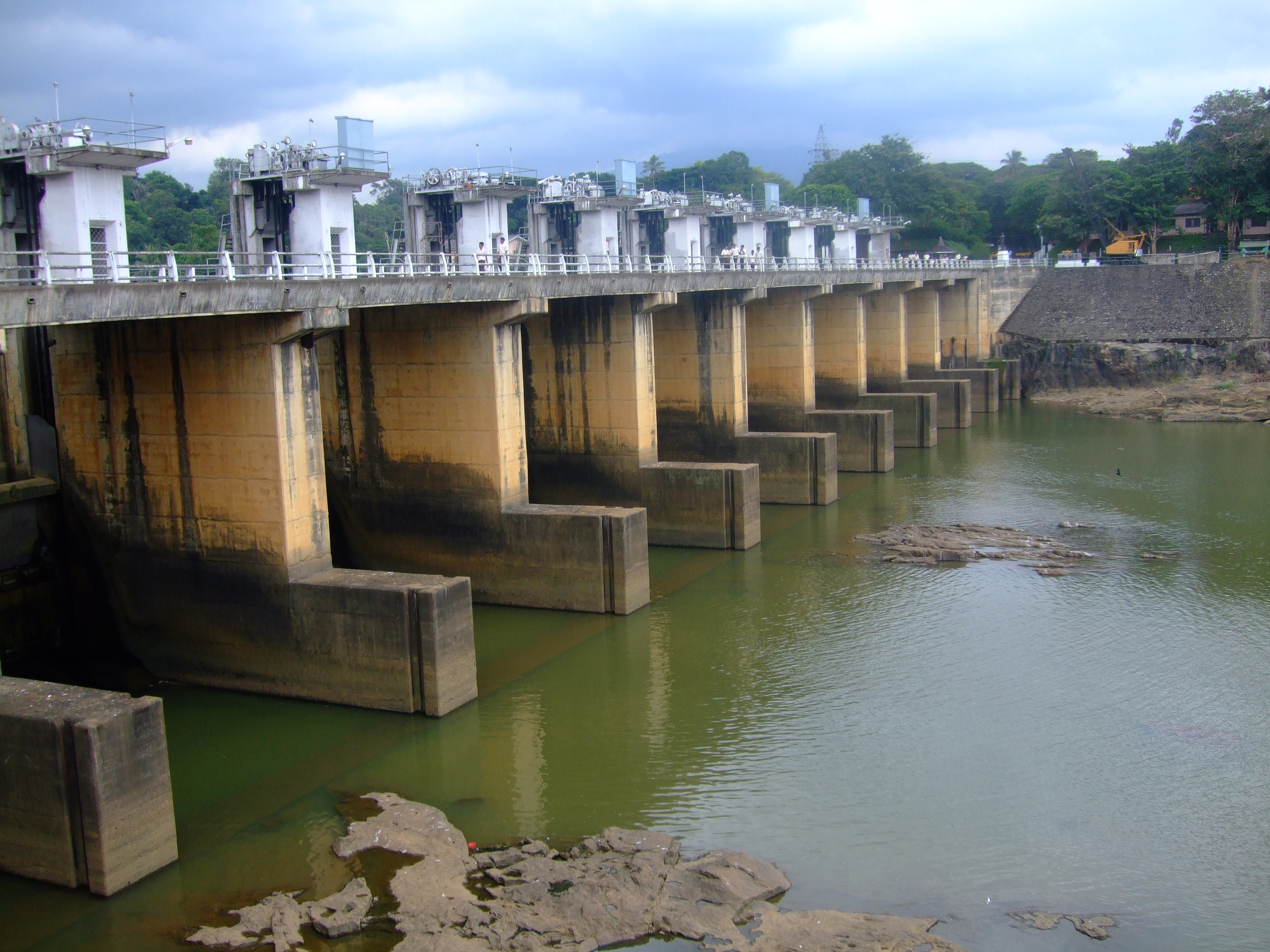
The Polgolla Barrage, as seen from the left-bank downriver.

Water from the Polgolla Reservoir is conveyed to the Ukuwela Power Station at 07°23′56″N 80°39′08″E, near Ukuwela, via an 8 km (5 mi) long underground trans-basin tunnel at a rate of 2,000 cu ft/s (57 m^{3}/s). The power station at Ukuwela consists of two 20 MW hydroelectric generators, totalling the plant capacity to 40 MW. Both units were commissioned in July 1976.

The discharge waters of the Ukuwela power station also contributes to several mini hydro powerplants.

== Irrigation ==
Water from the power station is discharged into the Sudu Ganga, which feeds cultivations along itself and then feed Bowatanna Reservoir. The downstream of Bowatanna reservoir is called Amban River, a major tributary to the Mahaweli River, which then connects back to the Mahaweli River at a distance of approximately 140 km (87 mi) downstream of the Polgolla Barrage.

== Surrounding ==
Polgolla Reservoir Waterdrome operates a short distance upstream on the inundation created by the barrage. Paranaganthota, a historical river crossing is also situated about 50m upstream of the barrage. The inundation of the barrage facilitates water extraction to the Greater Kandy Water Treatment Plant at Katugasthota which provides drinking water to Kandy.

== See also ==
- List of dams and reservoirs in Sri Lanka
- List of power stations in Sri Lanka
