= Deduru Oya =

River in Sri Lanka

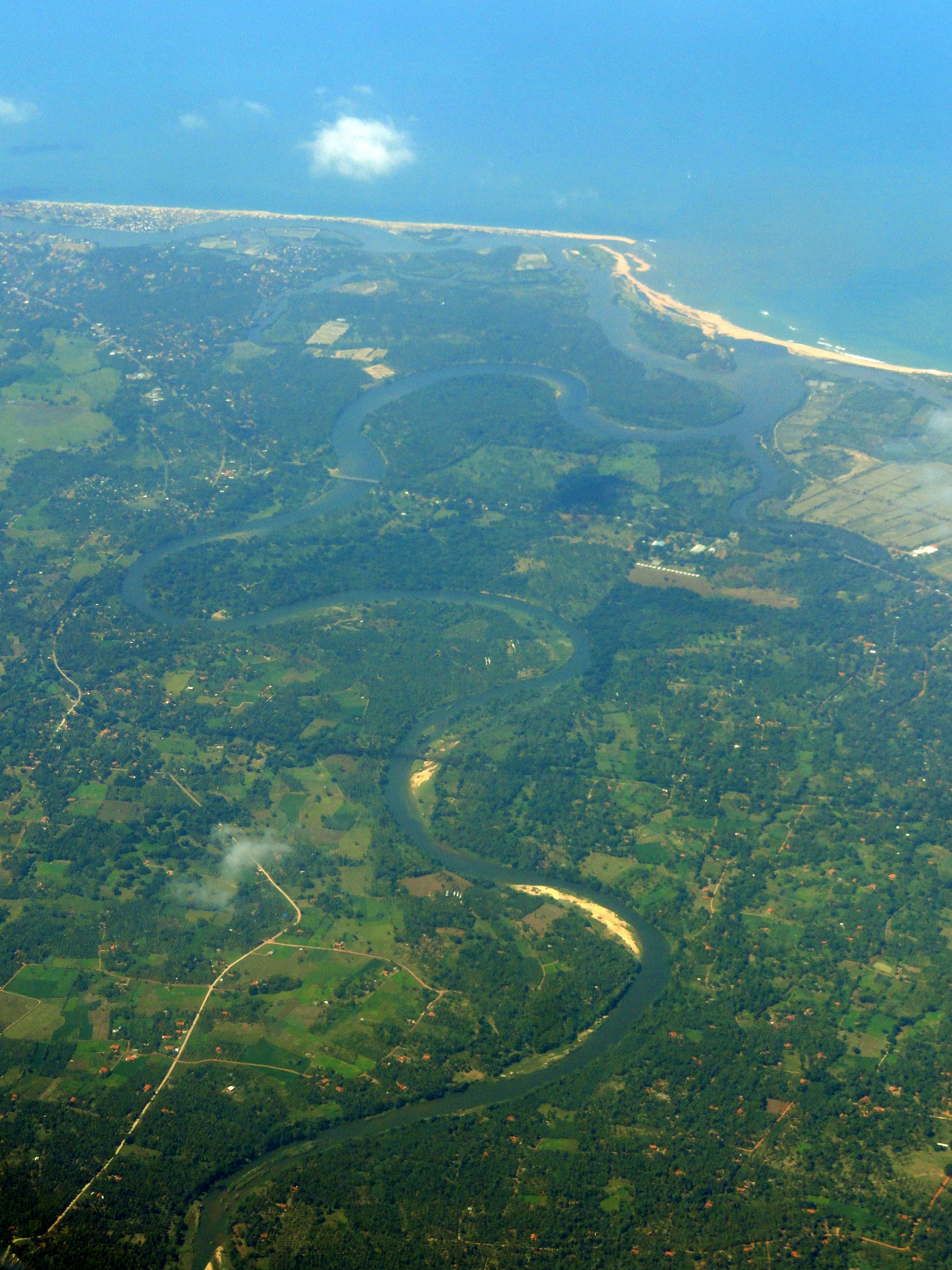
- Aerial view of the mouth of Deduru River, Chilaw.

- Location within Sri Lanka

Physical characteristics
- Source
  - location: Kurunegala District
- Mouth
  - location: MAHO
  - coordinates: 07°36′50″N 79°48′12″E
  - elevation: Sea level
- Length: 142 km (88 mi)
- Basin size: 2,620 km^{2} (1,010 sq mi)

The Deduru Oya (Tamil: மாயவன் ஆறு) is the sixth-longest river of Sri Lanka. The 142 km (88 mi) long river runs across four provinces and five districts.

== Tributaries ==
- Kospothu Oya
- Dik Oya
- Ratwila Ela
- Kimbulwana Oya
- Hakwatuna Oya
- Maguru Oya
- Kolamunu Oya
- Delvita Oya

Its catchment area receives approximately 4,313 million cubic metres of rain per year, and approximately 27 percent of the water reaches the sea. It has a catchment area of 2,620 square kilometres.
