= Mahaweli Authority =

State-owned authority in Sri Lanka

- Type: Government-owned corporation
- Founded: 19 April 1979
- Headquarters: Colombo, Sri Lanka
- Owner: Government of Sri Lanka
- Parent: Ministry of Irrigation
- Website: mahaweli.gov.lk

Mahaweli Authority is a state-owned operator in Sri Lanka for managing the Mahaweli River and its projects. It was established in 1979.

The primary objective of the Mahaweli Authority is to implement the Mahaweli River development scheme. One of the most significant achievements of the Mahaweli Authority is the Mahaweli Development Programme, which was initiated n 1961.

The Mahaweli Authority has also involved in the country's energy sector by developing hydroelectricity generation projects. The Mahaweli Authority has also been involved in promoting ecotourism in wildlife reserve areas.
