= Uma Oya Hydropower Complex =

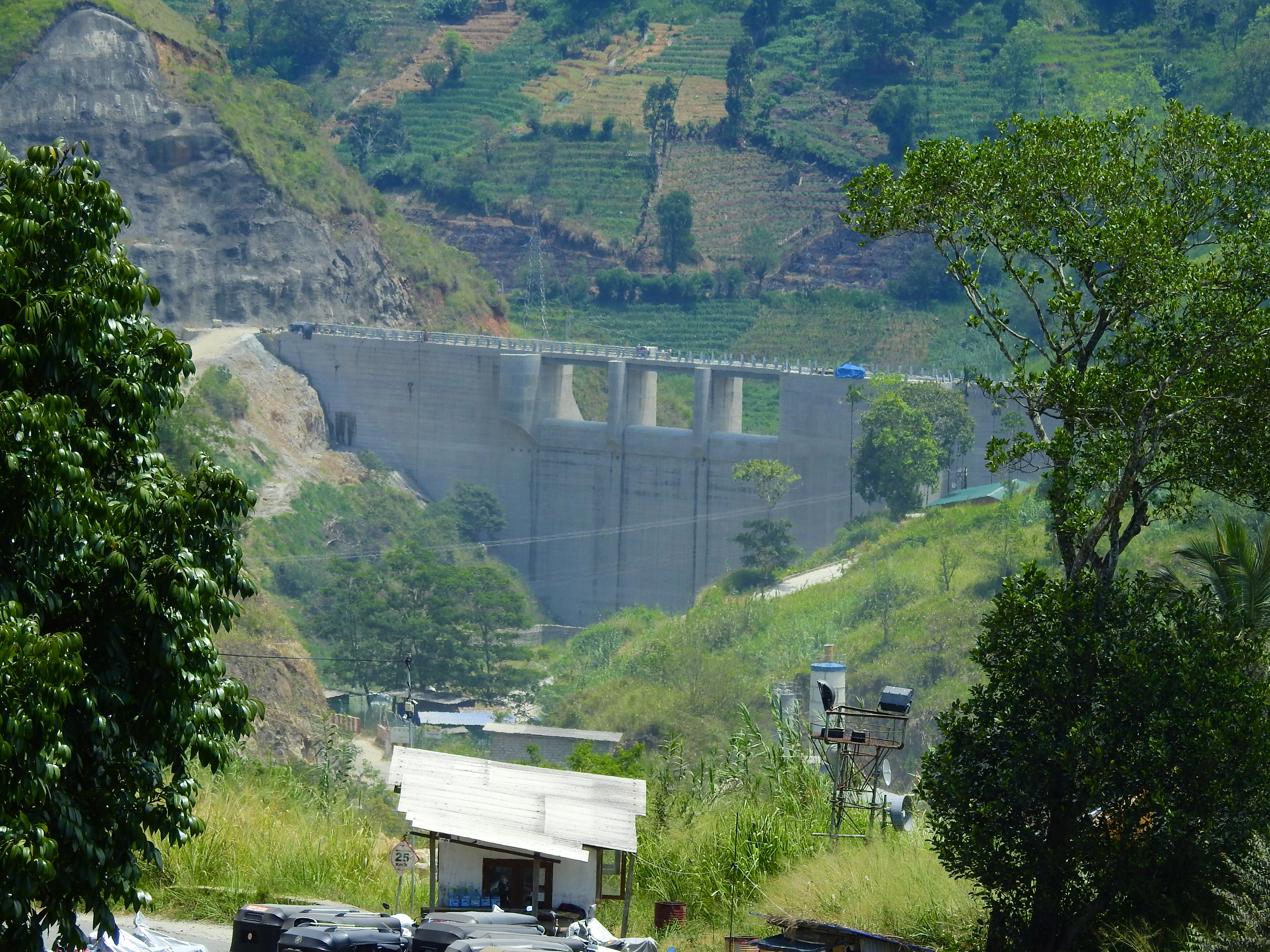

- Location within Sri Lanka
- Official name: Uma Oya Multipurpose Development Project
- Country: Sri Lanka
- Location: Uva Province
- Coordinates: PD: 06°54′51″N 80°56′00″E; DD: 06°53′13″N 80°57′23″E
- Purpose: Irrigation and Power
- Status: Operational
- Construction began: April 2008
- Opening date: April 2024
- Built by: FARAB

Dam and spillways
- Type of dam: Gravity dams
- Impounds: PD: Dalgolla Oya; DD: Mathatilla Oya
- Height (foundation): PD: 45 m (148 ft); DD: 50 m (160 ft)
- Length: PD: 175 m (574 ft); DD: 165 m (541 ft)
- Dam volume: PD: 50,000 m^{3} (1,800,000 ft^{3}); DD: 70,000 m^{3} (2,500,000 ft^{3})
- Spillways: PD: 3 DD: 3
- Spillway type: Chute spillways
- Spillway capacity: PD: 2,828 m^{3}/s (99,900 cu ft/s); DD: 2,161 m^{3}/s (76,300 cu ft/s)

Reservoir
- Creates: Puhulpola Reservoir/Dyraaba Reservoir
- Total capacity: PR: 634,826 m^{3} (22,418,700 ft^{3}); DR: 970,135 m^{3} (34,260,000 ft^{3})

Uma Oya Power Station
- Operator: Ceylon Electricity Board
- Type: Conventional
- Turbines: 2 × 60 MW
- Installed capacity: 120 MW
- Annual generation: 231 GWh

The Uma Oya Hydropower Complex (also internally called Uma Oya Multipurpose Development Project or UOMDP) is an irrigation and hydroelectric complex in the Badulla District of Sri Lanka. Early assessments of the project date back to 1989, when the first studies was conducted by the country's Central Engineering and Consultancy Bureau. The complex involves building a dam across Dalgolla Oya, and channelling water over a 3,975 m (13,041 ft) tunnel to Mathatilla Oya, both of which are tributaries of the Uma Oya. At Mathatilla Oya, another dam is constructed to channel 145,000,000 m^{3} (5.1×10^{9} ft^{3}) of water per annum, via a 15,290 m (50,160 ft) headrace tunnel to the Uma Oya Power Station, where water then discharged to the Alikota Aru via a 3,335 m (10,942 ft) tailrace tunnel.

The construction of the complex was inaugurated in April 2008 by former President Mahinda Rajapaksa and Iranian President Mahmoud Ahmadinejad. The total project cost is estimated to be approximately US$529 million (approximately Rs. 80 billion), 85% of which is provided by the Government of Iran.

The project was officially inaugurated by the President of Iran Dr. Ebrahim Raisi and President of Sri Lanka Ranil Wickremasinghe on 24 April 2024.

== History ==
In 2008 Sri Lankan government began the project with Iranian funding and the foundation stone for the project without obtaining Environmental Clearance for the project. Environmental Impact Assessment (EIA) Report of the Uma Oya Project was prepared by the University of Sri Jayawardhanapura and was submitted in November 2010. During the 30 working days the EIA was open to the public for review and comments Central Environmental Authority received many letters from environmental organizations who called the EIA inadequate. However despite the objections CEA gave clearance for the project.

== Puhulpola Dam ==
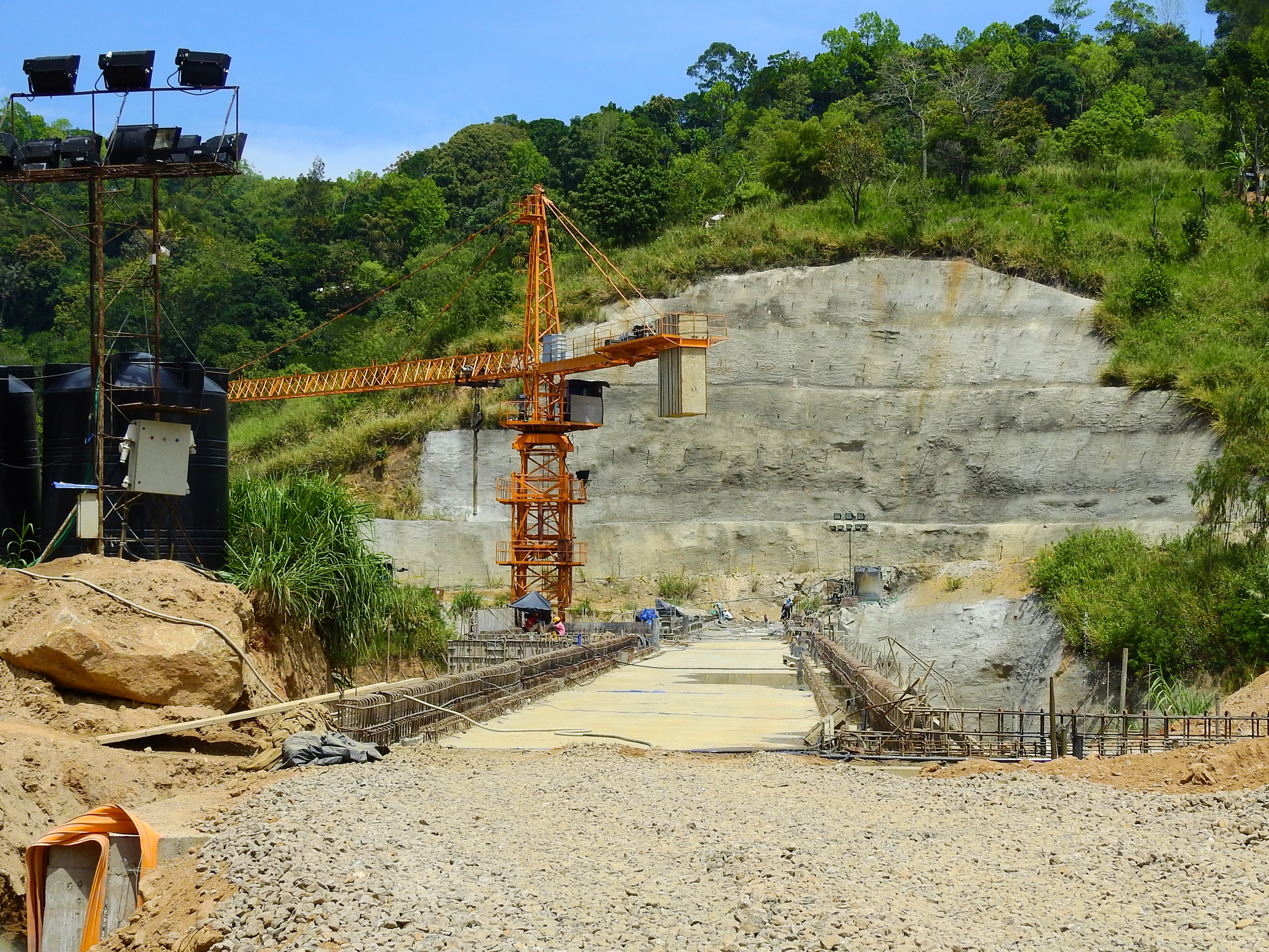
Puhulpola Dam under construction in March 2018.

Dalgolla Oya is impounded by the roller-compacted concrete Puhulpola Dam (PD), which is a gravity dam measuring 175 m (574 ft) and 45 m (148 ft) in length and height, respectively. The damming of this river creates the Puhulpola Reservoir (PR), which has a gross storage of 634,826 m^{3} (22,418,700 ft^{3}). The dam has a volume of approximately 50,000 m^{3} (1,800,000 ft^{3}), and consists of three chute spillways, allowing a combined discharge of up to 2,828 m^{3}/s (99,900 cu ft/s).

Water from the Puhulpola Reservoir is channelled to the Dyraaba Dam's reservoir via a 3,975 m (13,041 ft) horse-shoe shaped free-flow conveyance tunnel, measuring 4.10 m (13.5 ft) and 3.95 m (13.0 ft) in width and height respectively, and with a discharge capacity of 15 m^{3}/h (530 cu ft/h). Construction of the tunnel was completed on 14 January 2017. To build the tunnel, a drill-and-blast excavation method was used to displace approximately 55,000 m^{3} (1,900,000 ft^{3}) of earth.

== Dyraaba Dam ==
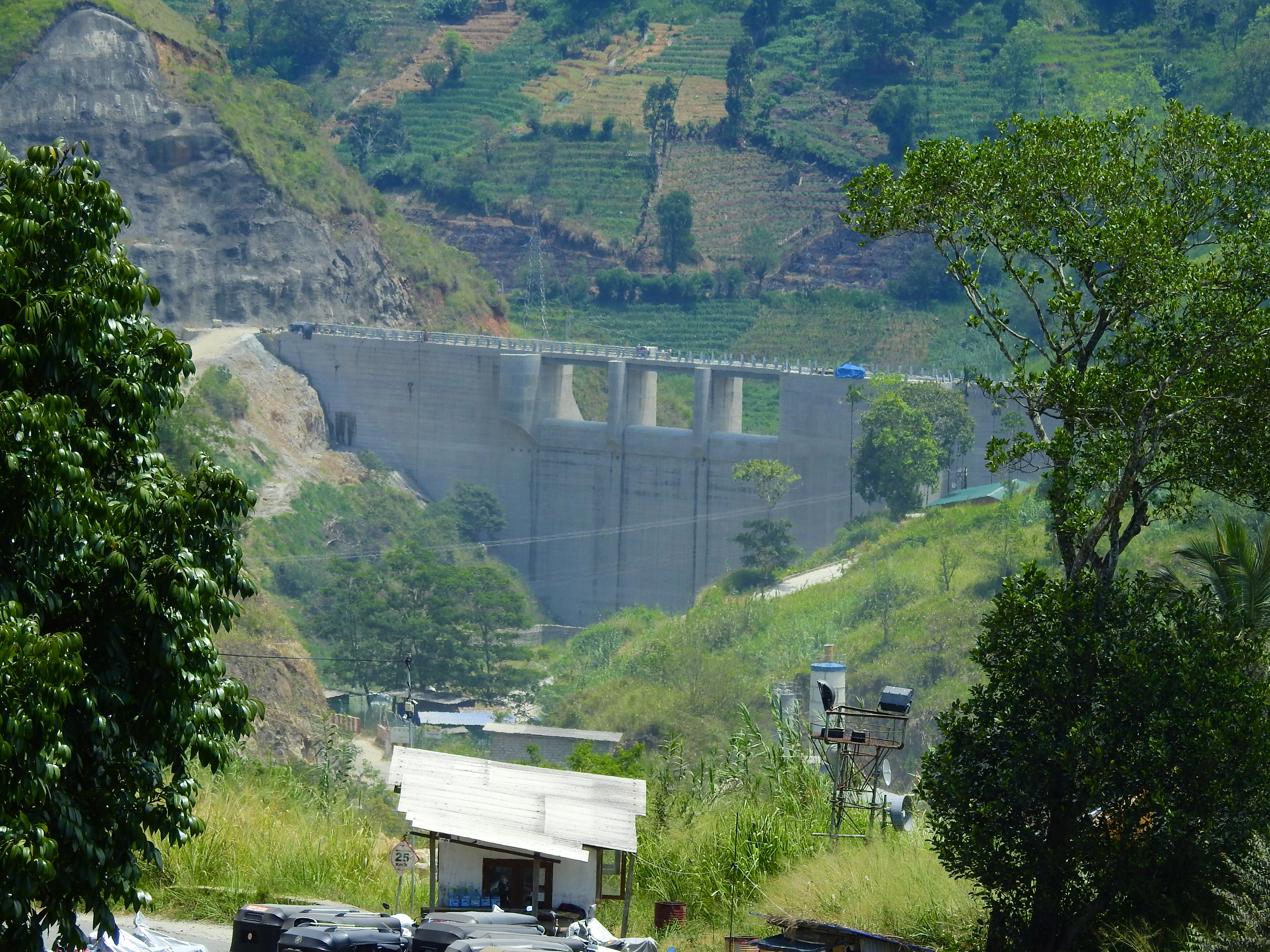
Dyraaba Dam under construction in March 2018.

With a concrete volume of more than 70,000 m^{3} (2,500,000 ft^{3}), the Dyraaba Dam (DD) measures 165 m (541 ft), 50 m (160 ft), and 6 m (20 ft), in length, height, and crest width, respectively. It is constructed 986 m (3,235 ft) above mean sea level (MSL), and can withstand an estimated flood level of 995 m (3,264 ft) MSL. Just like the Puhulpola Dam, the Dyraaba Dam consists of three chute spillways, allowing a combined discharge of up to 2,161 m^{3}/s (76,300 cu ft/s).

The dam creates the Dyraaba Reservoir (DR) which has a gross storage of 922,458.67 m^{3} (32,576,320 ft^{3}) and active storage of 600,000 m^{3} (21,000,000 ft^{3}). Water from the reservoir is channelled through a 15,290 m (50,160 ft) long circular pressurised-flow headrace tunnel measuring 4.25 m (13.94 ft) in diameter, which has a discharge capacity of 19.5 m^{3}/h (690 cu ft/h). To build the tunnel, a 180 m (590 ft) long TBM was used to displace approximately 222,000 m^{3} (7,800,000 ft^{3}) of earth.

=== Uma Oya Power Station ===
The two pelton turbine generators of 60 megawatt are fed via a 600 m (2,000 ft) vertical pressure shaft, after passing through the long tailrace tunnel. 68,000 m^{3} (2,400,000 ft^{3}) of earth was cleared to create the underground Uma Oya Power Station cavern. The 120 megawatt power station will generate up to 231 GWh per year. It was opened by president Ebrahim Raisi on 24 April 2024.

The 5,000 m^{2} (54,000 ft^{2}) switchyard premises is built at 504 m (1,654 ft) above MSL. Power from the switchyard is delivered over 21.5 km (13.4 mi) of double-circuit 132KV transmission line, consisting of more than 70 transmission towers, to the Badulla Substation.

The annual discharge of approximately 145,000,000 m^{3} (5.1×10^{9} ft^{3}) of water from the power station is distributed out via a 3,335 m (10,942 ft) cross-basin tailrace tunnel for agriculture use on 15 km^{2} (5.8 mi^{2}) or existing land and 45 km^{2} (17 mi^{2}) of new lands, including irrigation of 14 separate tanks.

== See also ==
- Electricity in Sri Lanka
