= Bowatenna Dam =

- Location within Sri Lanka
- Country: Sri Lanka
- Location: Bowatenna
- Coordinates: 07°40′00″N 80°40′00″E
- Status: Operational
- Opening date: June 1981
- Owner: Mahaweli Authority

Dam and spillways
- Type of dam: Gravity dam
- Height (foundation): 100 ft (30 m)
- Length: 741 ft (226 m)
- Spillway capacity: 125,000 cu ft/s (3,500 m^{3}/s)

Reservoir
- Creates: Bowetenna Reservoir
- Active capacity: 21,000 acre⋅ft (26,000,000 m^{3})
- Normal elevation: 800 ft (240 m)

Bowatenna Power Station
- Coordinates: 07°39′50″N 80°40′39″E
- Operator: CEB
- Turbines: 1 × 40 MW
- Installed capacity: 40 MW

The Bowatenna Dam is a 100 ft (30 m) high gravity dam at Bowatenna, in Central Province of Sri Lanka. The dam was built in June 1981, and is used primarily for irrigation. A 40 MW power station is also constructed 5,800 ft (1,800 m) downstream, for hydroelectric power generation.

== Reservoir and spillways ==
The dam creates the iconic Bowatenna Reservoir, measuring approximately 11,800 ft (3,600 m) and 10,500 ft (3,200 m) at its widest and longest latitude and longitude, respectively. The reservoir has an active capacity of 21,000 acre⋅ft (26,000,000 m^{3}) and a maximum surface elevation of 800 ft (240 m).

The dam consists of six spillways, measuring a combined width of 222 ft (68 m), or 16 ft (5 m) each. The spillways combined has a maximum discharge capacity of 125,000 cu ft/s (3,500 m^{3}/s).

After the completion of the Moragahakanda Dam, a percentage of water from the Bowatenna Reservoir would also be transferred to the new Moragahakanda Reservoir, to be located approximately 3 mi (4.8 km) away, via tunnel.

== Power station ==
The power station, located 5,800 ft (1,800 m) downstream, consists of a single Fuji 40 MW unit. The power station was commissioned in June 1981.

== See also ==
- Electricity in Sri Lanka
- List of dams and reservoirs in Sri Lanka
- List of power stations in Sri Lanka
