= Ministry of Irrigation and Water Resources Management =

Government ministry of Sri Lanka

Ministry of Irrigation
- වාරිමාර්ග අමාත්‍යාංශය நீர்ப்பாசன அமைச்சு

Ministry overview
- Jurisdiction: Government of Sri Lanka
- Headquarters: No. 500, T.B. Jaya Mawatha, Colombo 10
- Minister responsible: Hon. Roshan Ranasinghe, Minister of Irrigation
- Ministry executive: Anura Dissanayake, Secretary
- Child agencies: Department of Irrigation; Mahaweli Authority of Sri Lanka; Central Engineering Consultancy Bureau (CECB); Irrigation Management Division; Kothmale International Training Institute
- Website: www.irrigationmin.gov.lk

The Ministry of Irrigation (Sinhala: වාරිමාර්ග අමාත්‍යාංශය; Tamil: நீர்ப்பாசன அமைச்சு) is the cabinet ministry of the Government of Sri Lanka responsible for:

- The development of the nation's water resources and irrigation infrastructure
- The management of river basins, groundwater sources and irrigation systems a by operation and/or maintenance
- Conservation and protection of sources of water (groundwater included), including monitoring pollution levels and ensuring water quality, as well as preventing salt water intrusions into fresh water sources
- Allocation of water resource use at a national level (not to be confused with the more in-depth functions of the National Water Supply and Drainage Board)
- Maintaining national drainage networks and flood protection systems
- Engineering consultancy services
- Oversight and promotion of rainwater harvesting.

To this end, the ministry drafts policies and legislation, as well as provides guidelines, advice and consultancy.

== List of ministers ==
Minister of Irrigation
- Incumbent; Hon. Roshan Ranasinghe since 23 May 2022
- Nominator: Prime Minister of Sri Lanka
- Appointer: President of Sri Lanka

Parties

Sri Lanka Freedom Party United National Party Sri Lanka Podujana Peramuna

Name	Portrait	Party	Tenure	President	Ministerial title
Nimal Siripala de Silva		Sri Lanka Freedom Party	23 April 2010 - 9 January 2015	Mahinda Rajapaksa	Ministry of Irrigation and Water Resources Management
Duminda Dissanayake		Sri Lanka Freedom Party	12 January 2015 - 22 March 2015	Maithripala Sirisena	Ministry of Irrigation and Water Resources Management
Gamini Vijith Vijithamuni Soysa		Sri Lanka Freedom Party	22 March 2015 – 12 August 2020	Maithripala Sirisena	Ministry of Irrigation and Water Resources Management
Chamal Rajapaksa		Sri Lanka Podujana Peramuna	12 August 2020 -	Gotabaya Rajapaksa	Ministry of Irrigation
Roshan Ranasinghe		Sri Lanka Podujana Peramuna	23 May 2022 - Present	Gotabaya Rajapaksa	Ministry of Irrigation

== See also ==
- List of ministries of Sri Lanka
- Geography of Sri Lanka
- List of rivers of Sri Lanka
- List of dams and reservoirs in Sri Lanka
- Agriculture in Sri Lanka
