= Electricity Generation Lanka =

Sri Lankan electricity generation company

Electricity Generation Lanka (Private) Limited
- Native name: සීමාසහිත ලංකා විදුලි ජනන (පුද්ගලික) සමාගම; இலங்கை மின் உற்பத்தி (தனியார்) நிறுவனம்
- Type: State-owned private limited company
- Industry: Electricity generation
- Predecessor: Ceylon Electricity Board
- Founded: 9 March 2026; 6 months ago
- Headquarters: Colombo, Sri Lanka
- Key people: Saliya Panditharatne (CEO)
- Services: Power station operation and maintenance
- Owner: Government of Sri Lanka (100%)
- Website: egl.lk

Electricity Generation Lanka (Private) Limited (abbreviated as EGL Sinhala: සීමාසහිත ලංකා විදුලි ජනන (පුද්ගලික) සමාගම; Tamil: இலங்கை மின் உற்பத்தி (தனியார்) நிறுவனம்) is a state-owned public utility company in Sri Lanka responsible for the operation and maintenance of state-owned electricity generation assets. The company established and commenced operations on 9 March 2026, following the dissolution and unbundling of the Ceylon Electricity Board (CEB).

EGL functions as the largest wholesale power producer within the Sri Lankan electricity market, controlling the country's major hydroelectric complexes including the Mahaweli, Laxapana, and Samanala cascades as well as state-owned thermal power facilities. The entity operates under the regulatory supervision of the Public Utilities Commission of Sri Lanka (PUCSL).

== History ==
=== Background ===
For over five decades, electricity generation in Sri Lanka was managed by the Ceylon Electricity Board (CEB). In the wake of the 2022–2023 Sri Lankan economic crisis, the CEB's financial deficit, reliance on emergency power purchases, and administrative inefficiencies necessitated sector reforms. To introduce market competition, enhance transparency, and attract foreign direct investment into renewable energy, the government enacted the Sri Lanka Electricity Act, No. 36 of 2024 (later amended by Act No. 14 of 2025). This legislation mandated the unbundling of the CEB's vertically integrated structure into separate, financially independent corporate entities.

=== Formation ===
On 8 March 2026, the Ceylon Electricity Board Act No. 17 of 1969 was formally repealed, dissolving the CEB. On 9 March 2026, Electricity Generation Lanka (EGL) officially commenced operations, taking over the entire generation portfolio of the former utility.

Saliya Panditharatne was appointed as the company's first General Manager. EGL's sister companies formed during the split include Electricity Distribution Lanka (EDL), the National Transmission Network Service Provider (NTNSP), and the National System Operator (NSO).

== Generation assets and operations ==
EGL manages a diversified portfolio of generation facilities comprising large hydroelectric schemes, thermal power plants, and state-owned non-conventional renewable energy (NCRE) installations. As an unbundled generator, EGL sells its electrical output into the wholesale market under Power Purchase Agreements (PPAs) and system dispatch protocols managed by the System Operator.

=== Hydroelectric generation ===
Large-scale hydropower constitutes the historic base of EGL's operational capacity, divided administratively into three hydrological complexes:

- Mahaweli Complex: The largest generation division by installed capacity (~916 MW), harnessing the Mahaweli River basin. Major stations include Victoria, Kotmale, Upper Kotmale, Randenigala, Rantembe, and Moragahakanda.
- Laxapana Complex: Located within the Kelani River basin with a combined capacity of approximately 335 MW. Comprises historic and modernized stations including Old Laxapana, New Laxapana, Wimalasurendra, Canyon, Castlereigh, Norton, and Broadlands.
- Samanala Complex: Manages generation assets in the southern and western river basins (~100 MW), including the Kukule Ganga, Samanala, and Udawalawe power stations.

=== Thermal generation ===
To provide baseload power and maintain grid stability during dry monsoon cycles, EGL operates several state-owned thermal generation facilities:

- Lakvijaya Power Station: Located in Norocholai, this is Sri Lanka's sole coal-fired power station, comprising three 300 MW units with a combined base-load capacity of 900 MW.
- Kelanitissa Power Station: An oil and gas-turbine complex situated in Colombo, utilized primarily for intermediate and peaking generation requirements.
- Sapugaskanda Power Station: A heavy fuel oil (HFO) diesel generation facility providing grid stabilization and secondary peaking capacity.

Summary of EGL Generation Portfolio
Complex / Facility	Primary Fuel Source	Key Stations / Units	Approx. Installed Capacity (MW)
Mahaweli Complex	Hydropower	Victoria, Kotmale, Randenigala, Rantembe	916
Laxapana Complex	Hydropower	Laxapana, Canyon, Norton, Broadlands	335
Samanala Complex	Hydropower	Kukule Ganga, Udawalawe, Gal Oya	100
Lakvijaya Station	Coal	Norocholai Units 1, 2 & 3	900
Kelanitissa Complex	Heavy fuel oil / Naphtha	Kelanitissa Combined Cycle & Open Cycle	280
Sapugaskanda Station	Heavy fuel oil	Sapuganda A & B	160

== Mandate ==
Under the restructured framework, EGL is required to operate without the state subsidies that previously sustained the CEB. It generates revenue by entering into Power Purchase Agreements (PPAs) through a competitive wholesale market. EGL's operational mandate is aligned with Sri Lanka's updated National Energy Policy, which prioritizes the acceleration of renewable energy integration, the digitalization of grid infrastructure, and the gradual phasing out of fossil fuel dependency.

== See also ==
- Electricity Distribution Lanka
- Electricity sector in Sri Lanka
- List of power stations in Sri Lanka
