= Laxapana Power Station =

Laxapana Power Station may refer to:

- Old Laxapana Power Station, a hydroelectric power station fed by the Norton Dam in Sri Lanka
- New Laxapana Power Station, a hydroelectric power station fed by the Canyon Dam in Sri Lanka
- Polpitiya Power Station, a hydroelectric power station fed by the Laxapana Dam in Sri Lanka
