= Laxapana Falls =

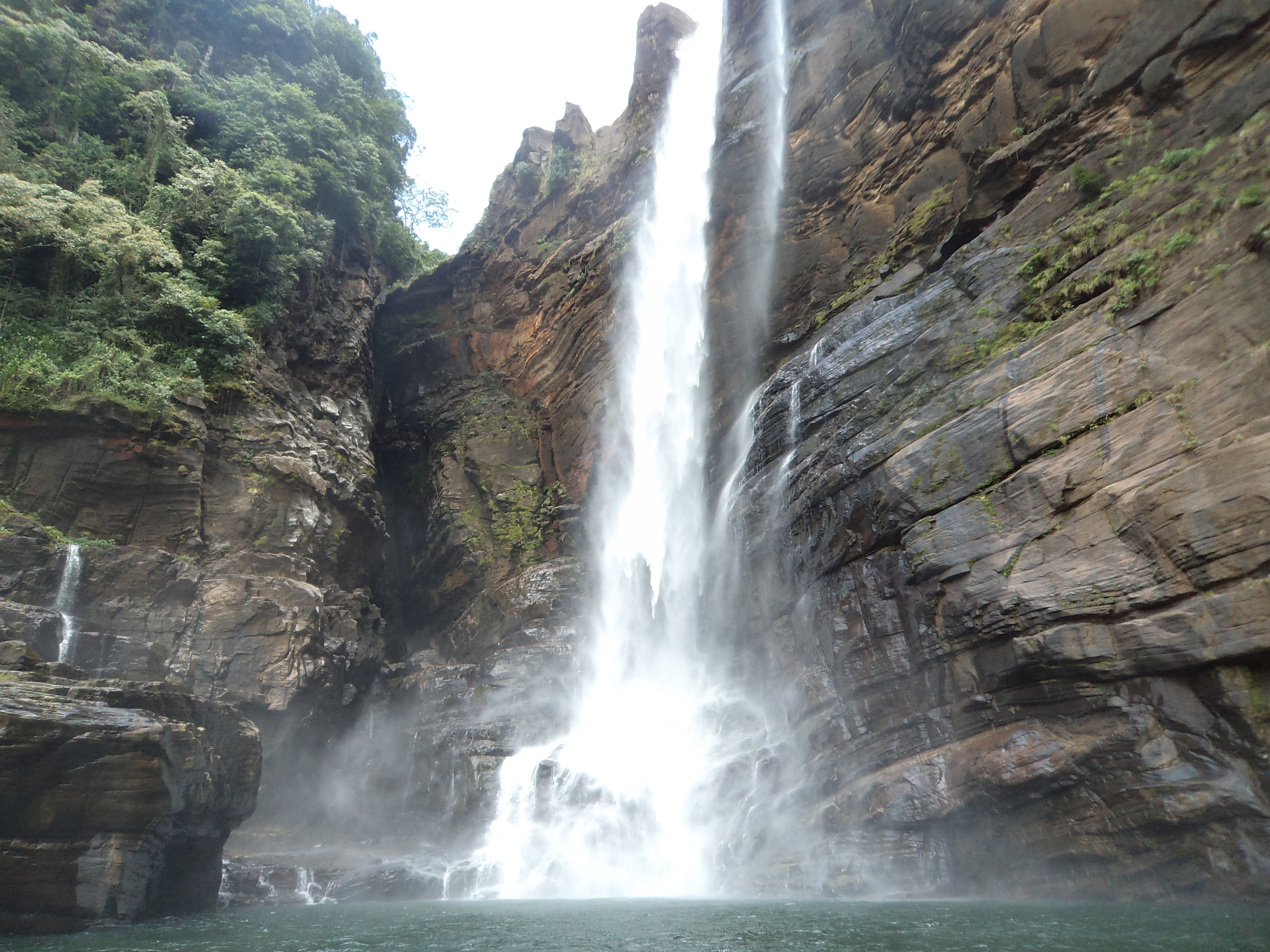
- Laxapana Falls
- Interactive map of Laxapana Falls
- Location: Hatton, Sri Lanka
- Coordinates: 6.9°N 80.50°E
- Type: plunge
- Total height: 126 m (413 ft)
- Number of drops: 1
- Total width: 23 m (75 ft)
- Watercourse: Maskeliya Oya
- World height ranking: 625

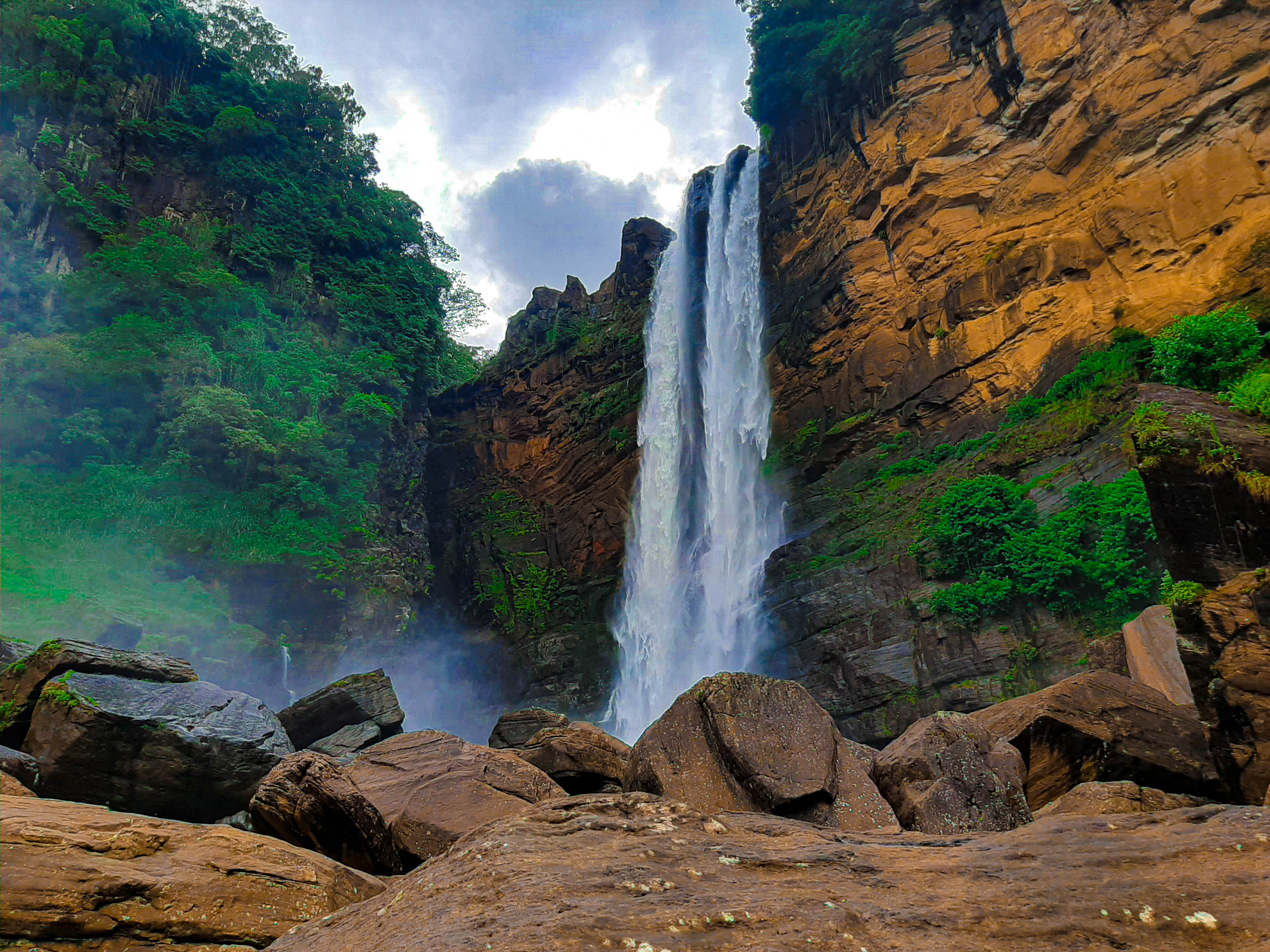

Laxapana Falls is, at 126 m (413 ft) high, the 8th highest waterfall in Sri Lanka and 625th highest in the world. It is situated in Maskeliya area in Nuwara Eliya District, about 16 km (10 mi) from Maskeliya town on Maskeliya-Norton Bridge road, in a village called Kiriwan Eliya. It is formed by Maskeliya Oya near the confluence of Kehelgamu Oya and Maskeliya Oya which forms Kelani River. The falls gives its name to twin hydroelectric power stations, Old Laxapana Power Station which generates 50 MW of electricity and New Laxapana Power Station which generates 100 MW.

== Folklore ==
According to popular folklore this was the place where Buddha mended his saffron robe when he was visiting Sri Pada. The name of the waterfall derives from Sinhala words of "Laxa", which means hundred thousand and "Pahana" or "Pashana", meaning rock.

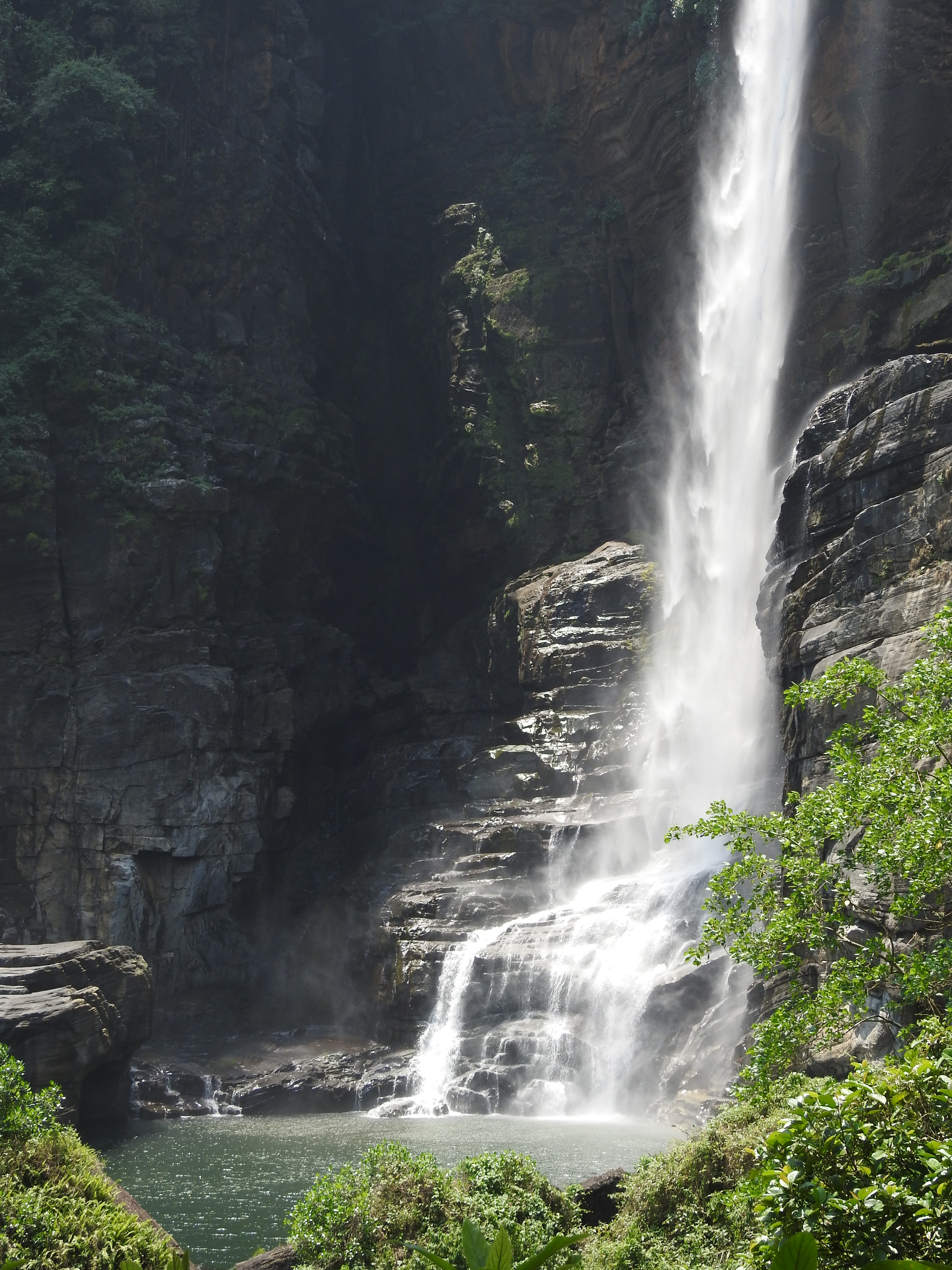
The base of the falls in March 2018

== See also ==
- List of waterfalls
- List of waterfalls in Sri Lanka
