= Maskeliya Oya =

Maskeliya Oya Maskeliya River
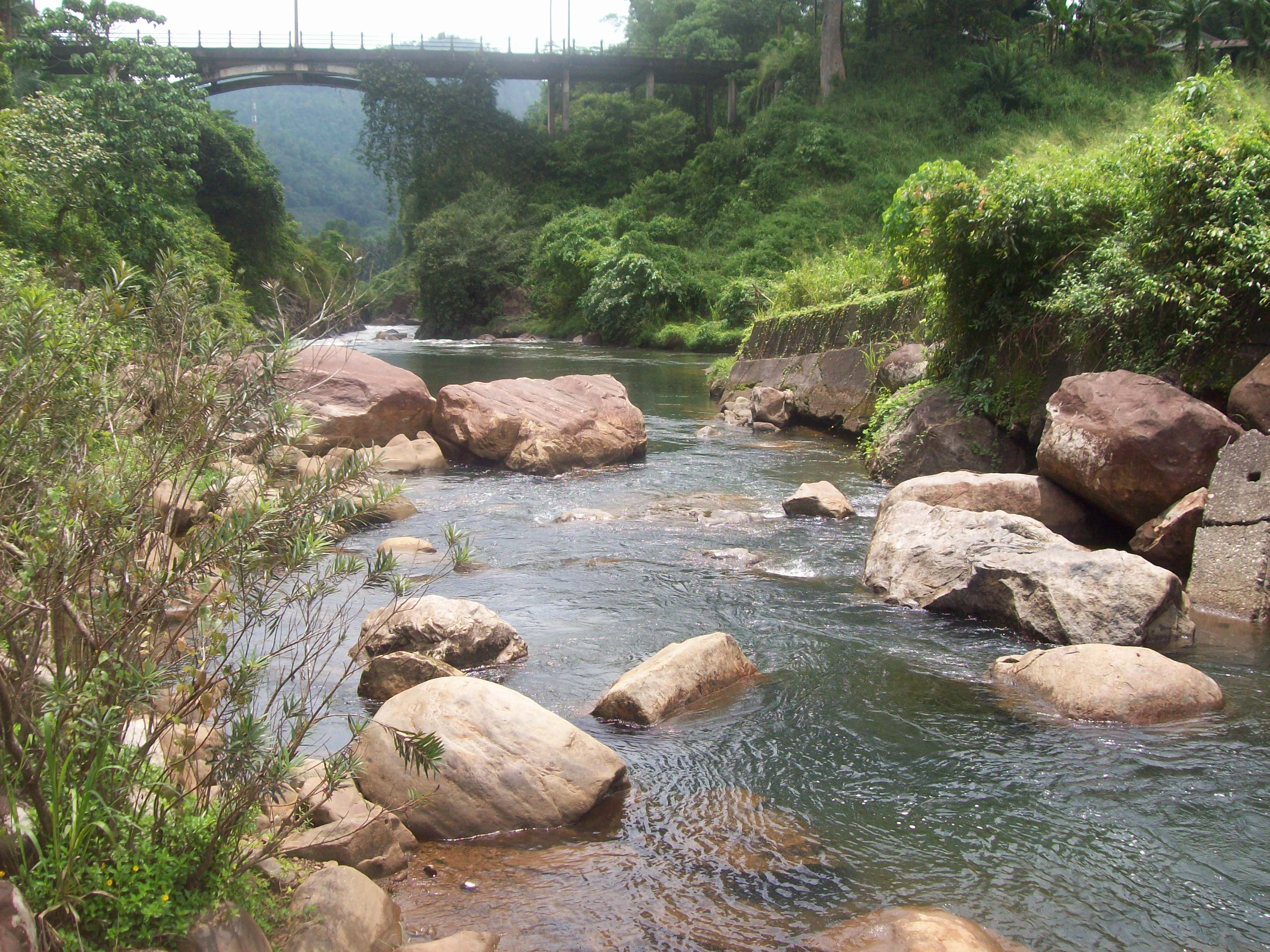
- Downstream view of the Maskeliya Oya, as seen from near the Polpitiya Hydroelectric Power Station.

Physical characteristics
- Source: Peak Wilderness Sanctuary
- Mouth: Kelani River
  - location: Kalugala
  - coordinates: 06°58′58″N 80°27′00″E
- Length: 40 km (25 mi)

The Maskeliya Oya (translated into Maskeliya River from Sinhala) is a major upstream tributary of the Kelani River in Sri Lanka. This 40 km (25 mi) long tributary originates in the hills of the Peak Wilderness Sanctuary, before passing through the Maskeliya Reservoir. The Maskeliya Oya converges with the Kehelgamu Oya at Kalugala, forming the 100 km (62 mi) long Kelani River. The river is heavily used for hydroelectric power generation.

== Features on the river ==
The following table lists the major features along the Maskeliya Oya, from its origins further upstream. Some dams hold back water, and transfer a percentage of it to hydroelectric power stations located further downstream, via tunnels.

Type	Subject	Location
Waterfall	Fairlawn Falls	06°46′20″N 80°37′20″E
Reservoir	Maskeliya Reservoir	06°49′47″N 80°33′40″E
Dam	Maskeliya Dam	06°50′37″N 80°32′56″E
Power station	Canyon Hydroelectric Power Station	06°52′09″N 80°31′40″E
Dam	Canyon Dam	06°52′18″N 80°31′34″E
Waterfall	Laxapana Falls	06°53′57″N 80°30′03″E
Power station	New Laxapana Hydroelectric Power Station	06°55′05″N 80°29′31″E
Power station	Old Laxapana Hydroelectric Power Station	06°55′07″N 80°29′30″E
Dam	Laxapana Dam	06°55′08″N 80°29′22″E
Power station	Polpitiya Hydroelectric Power Station	06°58′40″N 80°27′24″E
Dam	Broadlands Dam	06°58′43″N 80°27′16″E
Confluence	Kelani River	06°58′58″N 80°27′00″E

== See also ==
- List of dams and reservoirs in Sri Lanka
- List of rivers of Sri Lanka
