= Norwood, Sri Lanka =

Coordinates: 6°50′N 80°36′E

- Village
- Interactive map of Norwood, Sri Lanka
- Country: Sri Lanka
- Province: Central Province
- Time zone: UTC+5:30 (Sri Lanka Standard Time)

Norwood is a village in Sri Lanka located within the Central Province, near the banks of Kehelgamu Oya, a tributary of the Kelani River.

In 2017, Indian Prime Minister Narendra Modi addressed a gathering of Indian-origin Tamils at Norwood, in the presence of the Sri Lankan president, prime minister, and other community leaders.

== See also ==
- List of towns in Central Province, Sri Lanka
