= Laxapana Dam =

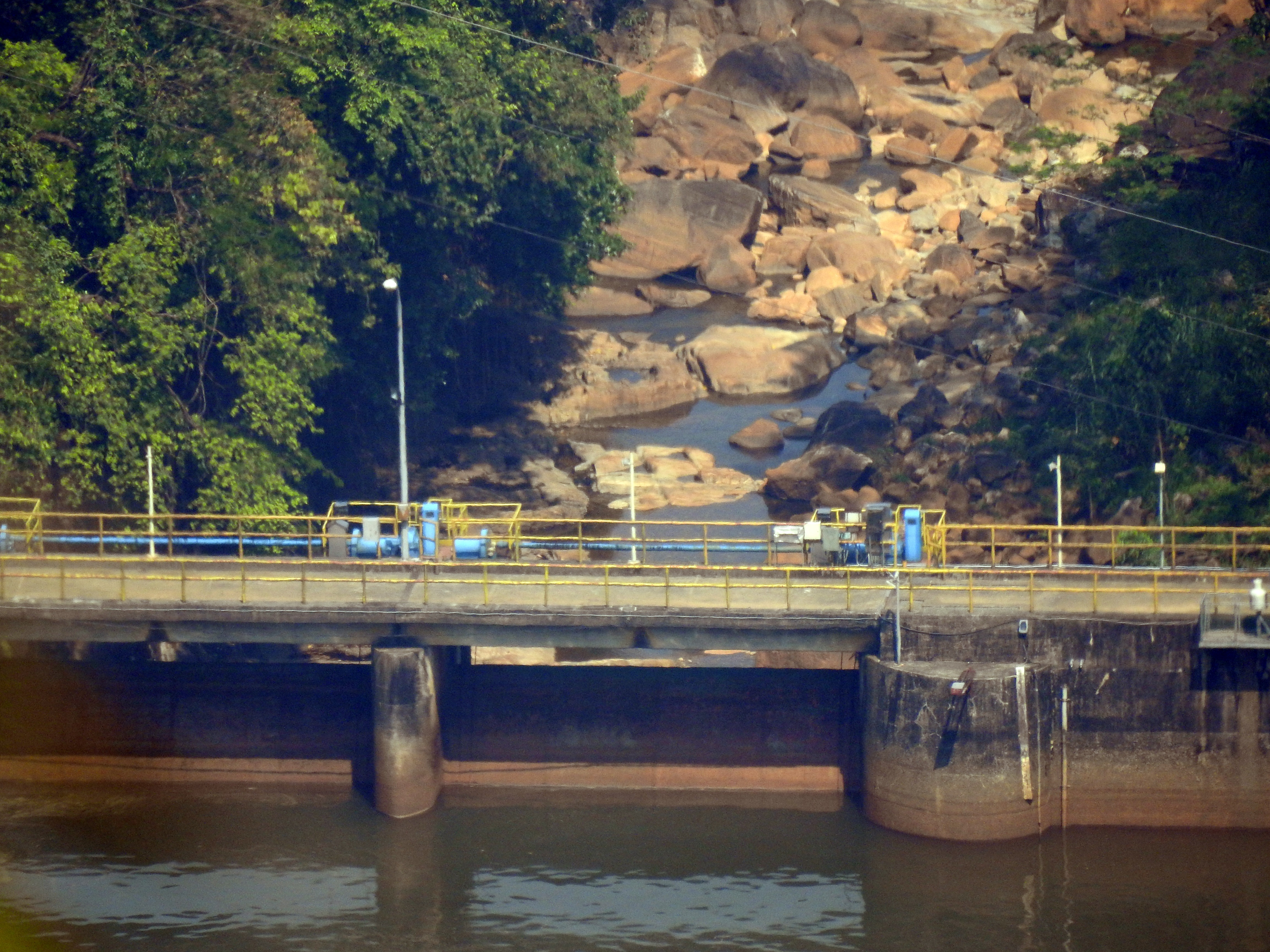

- Location within Sri Lanka
- Country: Sri Lanka
- Location: Laxapana; Central Province
- Coordinates: 06°55′08″N 80°29′22″E
- Purpose: Power
- Status: Operational
- Opening date: April 1969
- Owner: Ceylon Electricity Board

Dam and spillways
- Type of dam: Gravity dam
- Impounds: Maskeliya Oya

Reservoir
- Creates: Laxapana Reservoir
- Maximum length: 300 m (980 ft)
- Maximum width: 130 m (430 ft)

Polpitiya Power Station
- Coordinates: 06°58′40″N 80°27′24″E
- Turbines: 2 × 37.50 MW
- Installed capacity: 75 MW

The Laxapana Dam (Also called Samanala Hydroelectric Power Station) is a gravity dam built across the Maskeliya Oya, 2.8 km (1.7 mi) downstream of the Laxapana Falls, in the Central Province of Sri Lanka.

== Power station and reservoir ==
The dam creates the Laxapana Reservoir, which is sustained by water from the Kelani River, as well as discharged water from the Old Laxapana Hydroelectric Power Stations and New Laxapana Hydroelectric Power Stations. The Old Laxapana and New Laxapana hydroelectric power stations belong to the Norton Dam and Canyon Dam respectively, delivered via penstocks.

The combined hydro resource of the Laxapana Reservoir is fed into another penstock to a further 7.8 km (4.8 mi) downstream for utilization of power generation at the Polpitiya Power Station, located at 06°58′40″N 80°27′24″E. The power station, which is also called as the Samanala Hydroelectric Power Station, consists of two generation units rated at 37.50 MW each, both of which were commissioned in April 1969.

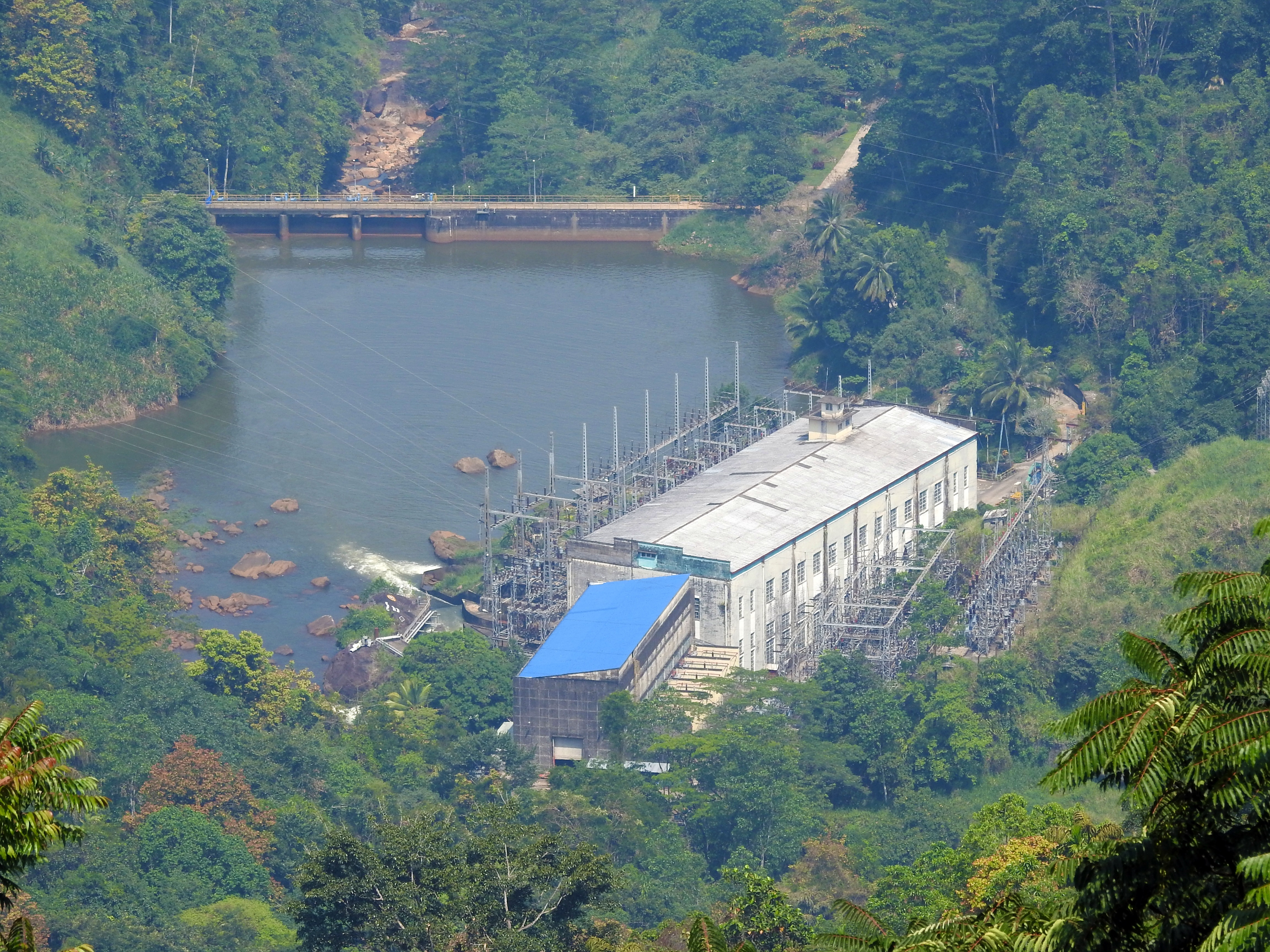
Upstream view of the Laxapana Dam and Reservoir. The buildings located immediately upstream are the Old Laxapana Power Station (white roof) and the New Laxapana Power Station (blue roof), belonging to the Norton Dam and Canyon Dam, respectively.

== See also ==
- List of dams and reservoirs in Sri Lanka
- List of power stations in Sri Lanka
