= EGL =

EGL may refer to:

== Computing ==
- EGL (API), an OpenGL interface
- EGL (programming language)

== Other uses ==
- Eesti Gaidide Liit, an Estonian Guides Association
- Elektrizitäts-Gesellschaft Laufenburg, a Swiss energy company
- Electricity Generation Lanka, a state-owned utility company in Sri Lanka
- Emilian dialect of the Emilian-Romagnol language
- Engility, an American defense company
- Enterprise Group (Ghana), a Ghanaian insurance company
- European Gemological Laboratory; see Diamond clarity
- Elegant Gothic Lolita; see Gothic Lolita
- Neghelle Airport, Ethiopia (IATA code EGL)
