= Kalugala =

Coordinates: 7.3865°N 80.8964°E

- Village
- Interactive map of Kalugala
- Country: Sri Lanka
- Province: Central Province
- Time zone: UTC+5:30 (Sri Lanka Standard Time)

Kalugala is a village in Sri Lanka located within the Central Province. It is a strategic region as Kehelgamu Oya, a tributary, begins to merge into the main river body of the Kelani river near this area. It has a post office and is located next to the Kehelpathdoaruwa hiking area.
