= Norton Bridge, Sri Lanka =

Village in Sri Lanka

Norton Bridge
- Village

- Location within Sri Lanka
- Country: Sri Lanka
- Province: Central Province
- District: Nuwara Eliya District
- Divisional Secretariat: Nuwara Eliya Divisional Secretariat
- Elevation: 945 m (3,100 ft)
- Time zone: UTC+5:30 (Sri Lanka Standard Time)
- Area code: 051

Norton Bridge, Sri Lanka is a village in Sri Lanka. It is located within Nuwara Eliya district, in the Central Province.

The town is located near the Norton and Castlereagh Dams, which are part of the Laxapana Hydroelectric complex, operated by the Ceylon Electricity Board.

== Transport ==
The town is located at the intersection of the B71 (Carolina - Norton - Wanarajah) and B328 (Norton - Maskeliya) roads.

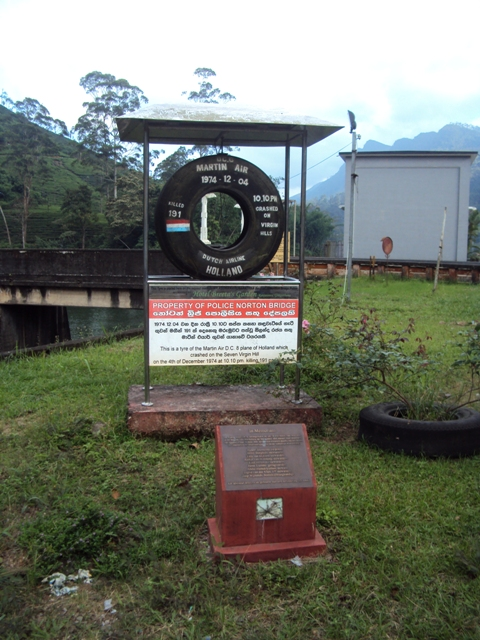
Martinar DC-8 memorial

== Martinar DC-8 memorial ==
A small memorial has been erected in the town, recognising the victims of the deadly crash of Martinair Flight 138 in December 1974. The flight crashed into a nearby mountain (Saptha Kanya mountain range), killing all 191 people aboard – 182 passengers, and nine crew members. The crash remains the deadliest in Sri Lankan aviation history and the third-deadliest involving a DC-8.

== See also ==
- List of towns in Central Province, Sri Lanka
