= Kotmale Biyagama transmission line =

Location
- Country: Sri Lanka
- Coordinates: 7.06083°N 80.59722°E
- General direction: East - West
- From: Kotmale
- To: Biyagama

Ownership information
- Owner: CEB
- Operator: CEB

Construction information
- Commissioned: 1979

Technical information
- Type: Overhead transmission line
- Current type: HVAC
- Total length: 66 km (41 mi)
- AC voltage: 220 kV
- No. of circuits: 4

Kotmale Biyagama transmission line is one of Sri Lanka's critical transmission lines that connects the load center Colombo to hydroelectricity generation of Mahaweli Complex.
