= Broadlands Dam =

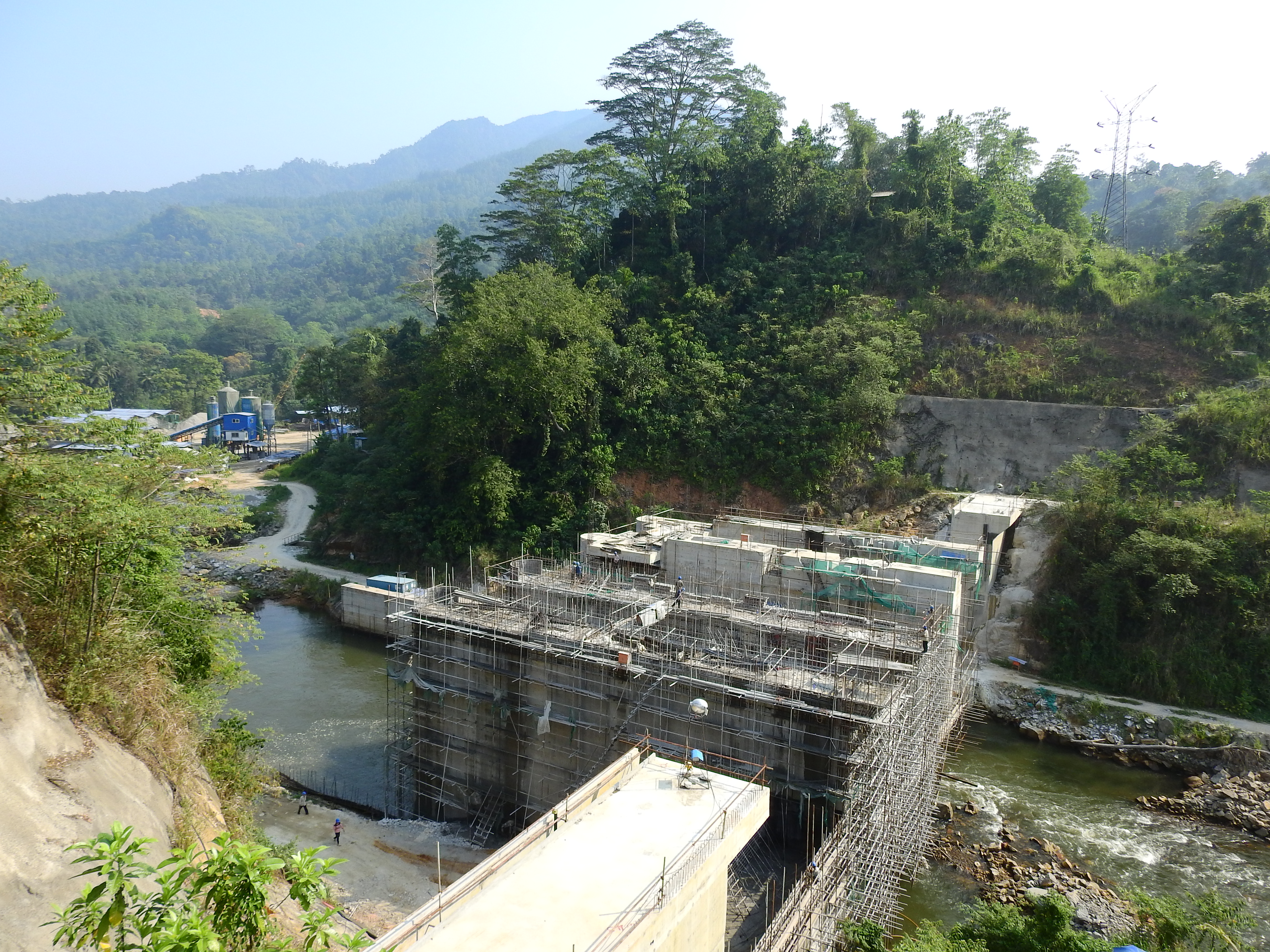
- Interactive map of Broadlands Dam
- Country: Sri Lanka
- Location: Kitulgala
- Coordinates: 06°58′44″N 80°27′16″E
- Purpose: Power
- Status: Under construction
- Construction began: 17 July 2013
- Opening date: 2020
- Construction cost: US$82 million

Dam and spillways
- Type of dam: Gravity dam
- Impounds: Maskeliya Oya
- Height (thalweg): 24 m (79 ft)
- Length: 114 m (374 ft)

Reservoir
- Total capacity: 198,000 m^{3} (7,000,000 ft^{3})
- Catchment area: 201 km^{2} (78 mi^{2})
- Normal elevation: 122 m (400 ft)

Power Station
- Coordinates: 06°59′01″N 80°25′34″E
- Operator: CEB
- Turbines: 2 x 17.5 MW
- Installed capacity: 35 MW
- Annual generation: 126 GWh
- Website http://www.bhpceb.lk/

The Broadlands Dam (also known as the Broadlands Hydropower Project by the developers) is a 35 MW run-of-the-river hydroelectric complex currently under construction in Kitulgala, Sri Lanka. The project is expected to be completed in 2020, and will consist of two dams, and a power station downstream.

With an estimated annual generation capacity of 126 GWh, the facility will be the country's last major hydroelectric project, due to the exhaustion of island-wide hydropower potential. Construction of the project was ceremonially inaugurated by the Minister of Power and Energy Mrs. Pavithra Wanniarachchi at the auspicious time of 11:01 on 17 July 2013.

Approximately 85% of the US$82 million project funding was met via credit arrangements made with the Chinese government, with the rest borne via a loan from the local Hatton National Bank. The construction contract of the project was granted to the China National Electric Equipment Corporation (CNEEC).

== Dams and reservoirs ==
The primary gravity dam measuring 24 m (79 ft) in height and 114 m (374 ft) in length is being constructed across the Maskeliya Oya at Kitulgala, and will supply water to the power station via a 3,404.7 m (11,170.3 ft) penstock measuring 5.4 m (17.7 ft) in diameter.

A secondary gravity weir, measuring 19 m (62 ft) and 48 m (157 ft) in height and length, is also to be built in the vicinity, over the nearby Kehelgamu Oya, to provide additional hydroelectric capacity. The weir, to be called the Kehelgamu Weir, will create a catchment area of 176 km^{2} (68 mi^{2}), and will provide additional head to the penstock of the main dam via a 811 m (2,661 ft) tunnel.

The penstock from the main dam will feed a power station consisting of two 3-phase synchronous turbines, each of 17.5 MW and a rated discharge of 32 m^{3} (1,130 ft^{3}) per second.

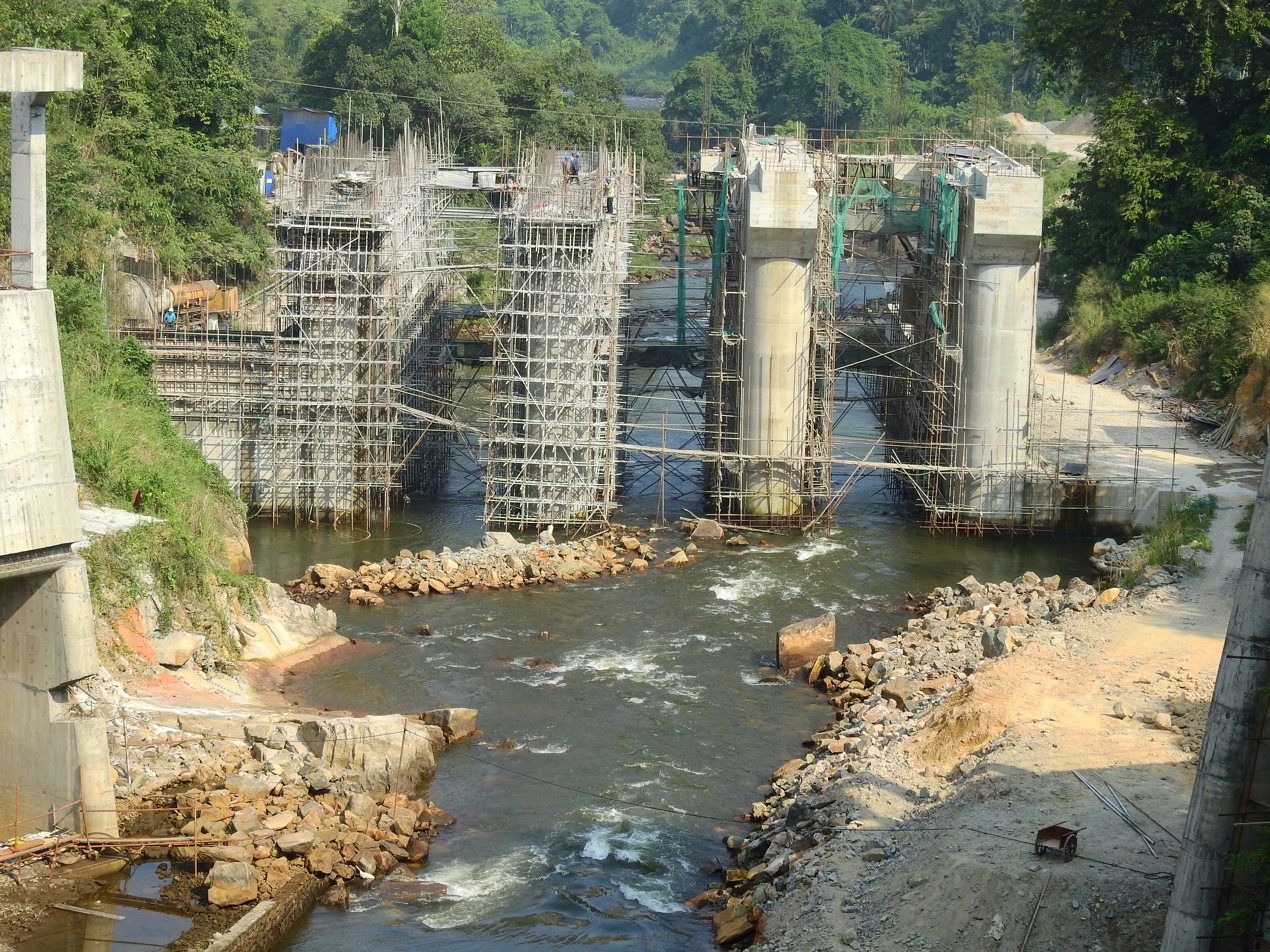
The dam under construction in March 2018.

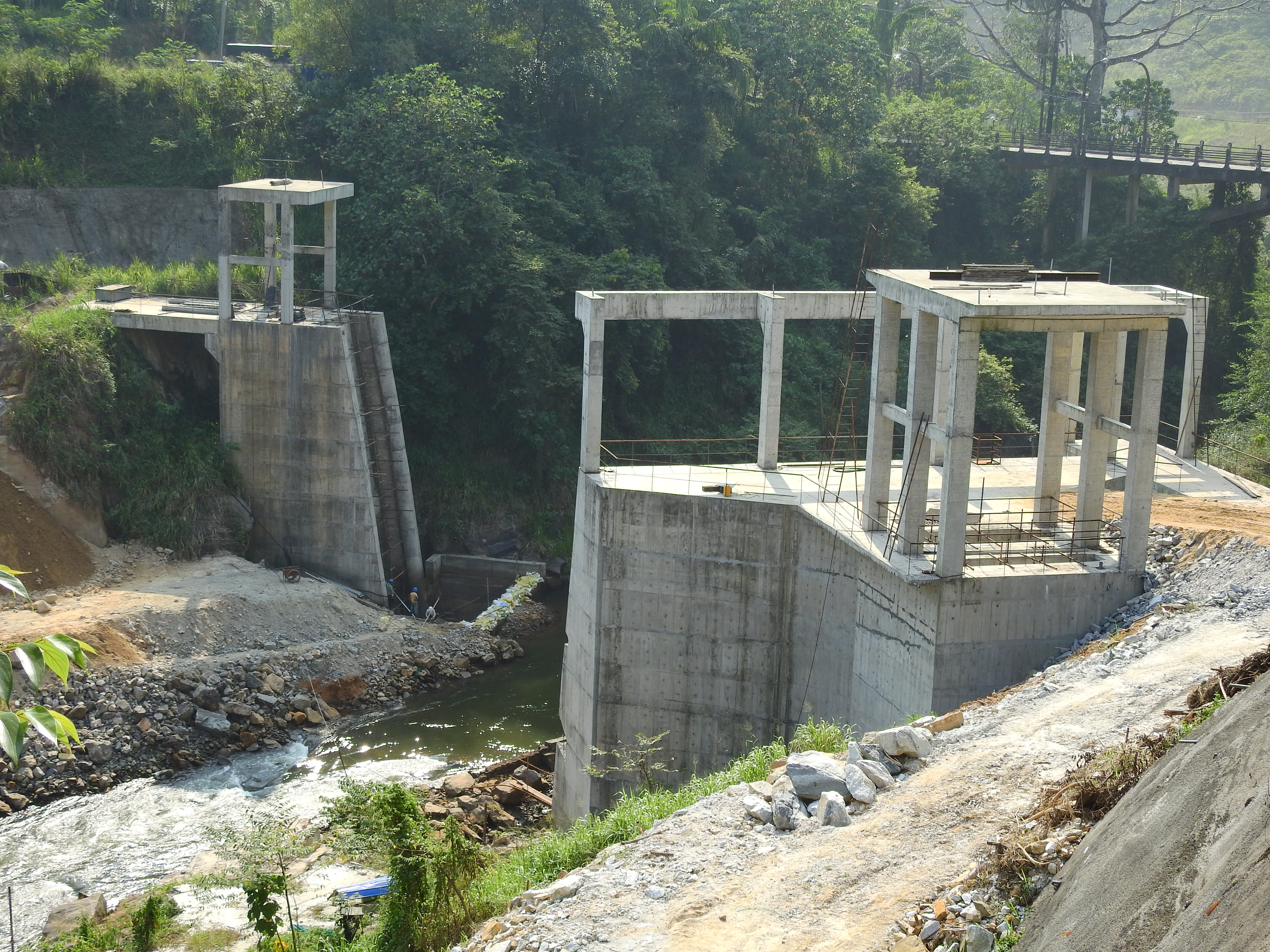
Intake structure.

== See also ==
- Electricity in Sri Lanka
- List of dams and reservoirs in Sri Lanka
- List of power stations in Sri Lanka
