= Electricity Distribution Lanka =

Sri Lankan electricity company

Electricity Distribution Lanka (Private) Limited
- Native name: සීමාසහිත ලංකා විදුලි බෙදාහැරීමේ (පුද්ගලික) සමාගම; இலங்கை மின் விநியோக (தனியார்) நிறுவனம்
- Type: State-owned private limited company
- Industry: Electricity distribution
- Predecessor: Ceylon Electricity Board
- Founded: 9 March 2026; 7 months ago
- Headquarters: Colombo, Sri Lanka
- Key people: Eng. K. S. I. Kumara (Chief Executive Officer)
- Services: Grid maintenance and electrification; End-user metering and billing
- Owner: Government of Sri Lanka (100%)
- Website: www.edl.lk

Electricity Distribution Lanka (Private) Limited (EDL) is a Sri Lankan state-owned enterprise that supplies and distributes electricity. Formally commencing operations on 9 March 2026, the utility company was established following the unbundling and dissolution of the Ceylon Electricity Board.

EDL functions as a monopoly across most of the island's distribution zones, with the exception of specific urban regions serviced by the Lanka Electricity Company. The company operates as an independent, financially accountable corporate entity, and is regulated by the Public Utilities Commission of Sri Lanka.

== Background and establishment ==
For 56 years, Sri Lanka's electricity generation, transmission, and distribution were controlled by the Ceylon Electricity Board, which acted as a state monopoly. During the 2023 Sri Lankan economic crisis, the CEB's operational inefficiencies and debt burden triggered a push for national economic reform.

In June 2024, the Government of Sri Lanka passed the Sri Lanka Electricity Act No. 36 of 2024, which repealed the Ceylon Electricity Board Act No. 17 of 1969. This legislation mandated the division of the CEB into independent corporate entities to improve transparency, secure financial sustainability, and attract private investment.

As part of this unbundling, Electricity Distribution Lanka was incorporated to inherit the CEB's physical assets, liabilities, distribution network, and consumer base. The company formally assumed duties on 9 March 2026, with Eng. K. S. I. Kumara appointed as its first General Manager. Simultaneously, other former CEB responsibilities were transferred to newly formed sister companies, including the National Transmission Network Service Provider (NTNSP) for the transmission grid, and Electricity Generation Lanka (EGL) for power stations.

== Operations ==
As the country's primary public-facing electricity provider, EDL is mandated to purchase electricity from the wholesale market—managed by the National System Operator—and retail it to end-users. The company is tasked with implementing operational improvement to enhance the overall quality of service within the distribution sector.

Aligning with the National Energy Policy, EDL's operational goals include deploying automated demand response systems and smart grid technologies. The company is also working to gradually replace overhead bare aluminium conductors in urban areas with underground cables or insulated Aerial Bundled Conductors (ABC).

=== Tariffs ===
End-user electricity rates are approved by the PUCSL. EDL and LECO both share identical electricity rates for their consumers.

== See also ==
- Ceylon Electricity Board
- Electricity sector in Sri Lanka
- Lanka Electricity Company
- Public Utilities Commission of Sri Lanka
