= Kiriwan Eliya =

Coordinates: 6°55′N 80°30′E

Koththallena
- Village
- Interactive map of Koththallena
- Country: Sri Lanka
- Province: Central Province
- District: Nuwara Eliya
- Time zone: UTC+5:30 (Sri Lanka Standard Time)

Kiriwan Eliya is a village in Central Province of Sri Lanka.

It is located in Maskeliya area in Nuwara Eliya District. Laxapana Falls, the 8th highest waterfall in Sri Lanka, is located here.

== See also ==
- List of towns in Central Province, Sri Lanka
