= Kehelgamu Oya =

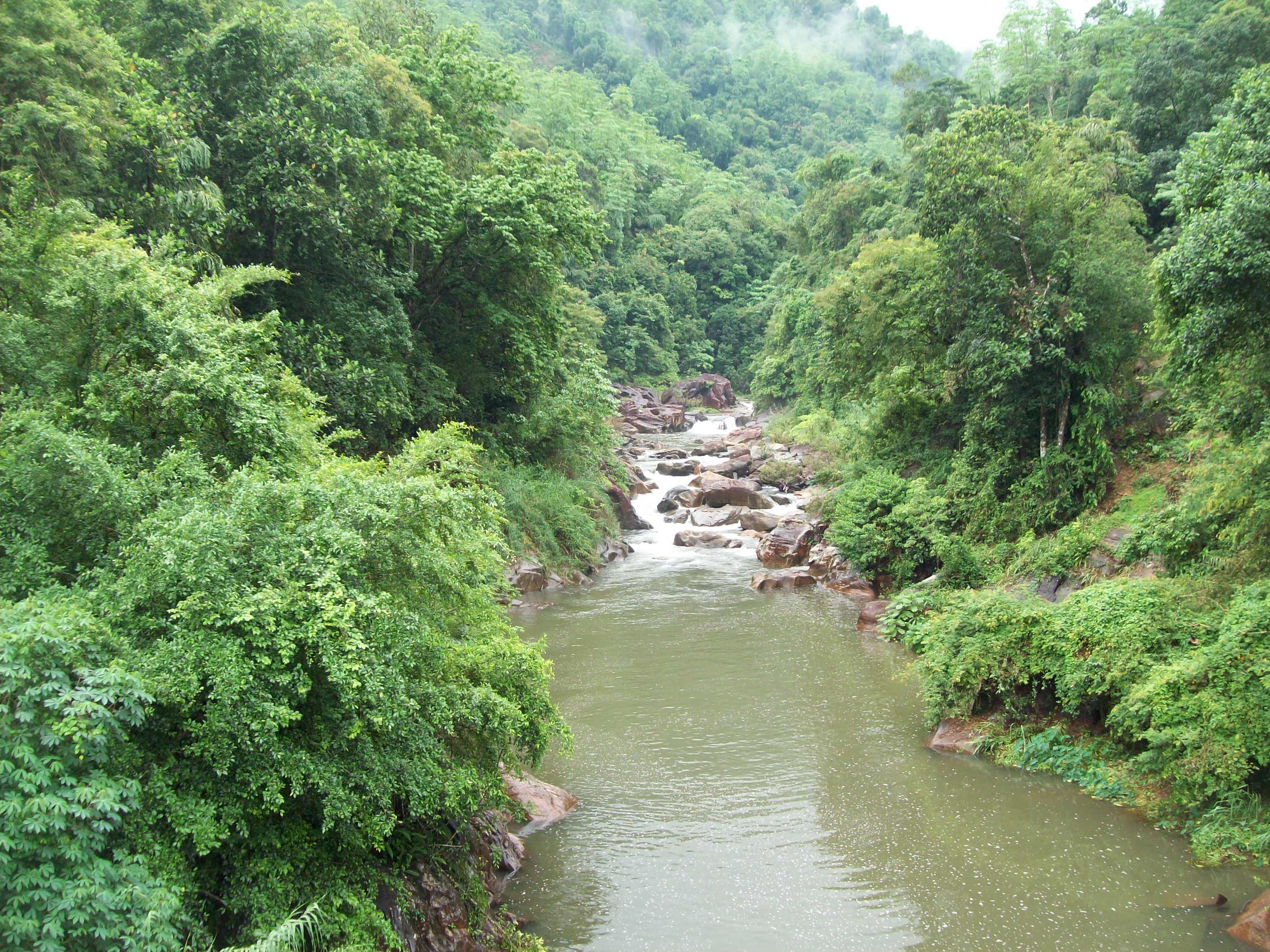
- Downstream view of the Kehelgamu Oya, as seen from the bridge near Kalugala, Sri Lanka.

Physical characteristics
- Source: Horton Plains
- Mouth
  - location: Kalugala
  - coordinates: 06°58′58″N 80°27′00″E
- Length: 50 km (31 mi)

Basin features
- River system: Kelani

The Kehelgamu Oya (translated into Kehelgamu River from Sinhala) is a major upstream tributary of the Kelani River in Sri Lanka. The tributary measures 50 km (31 mi) in length, originating in the hills of the Horton Plains National Park, before passing through the Castlereigh Reservoir. Kehelgamu Oya converges with the Maskeliya Oya at Kalugala, forming the 100 km (62 mi) long Kelani River. The river is heavily used for hydroelectric power generation.

== Features on the river ==
The following table lists the features along the Kehelgamu Oya, from its origins further upstream. Some dams hold back water, and transfer a percentage of it to hydroelectric power stations located further downstream, via tunnels.

Type	Subject	Location
Water airport	Castlereigh Water Airport	06°51′33″N 80°35′00″E
Dam	Castlereigh Dam	06°52′24″N 80°33′59″E
Power station	Wimalasurendra Power Station	06°54′31″N 80°31′30″E
Dam	Norton Dam	06°54′50″N 80°31′18″E
Waterfall	Aberdeen Falls	06°56′55″N 80°30′07″E
Dam	Kehelgamu Weir	06°59′07″N 80°27′24″E
Confluence	Kelani River	06°58′58″N 80°27′00″E

== See also ==
- List of dams and reservoirs in Sri Lanka
- List of rivers of Sri Lanka
