= Castlereigh Dam =

Dam in Hatton, Central Province, Sri Lanka

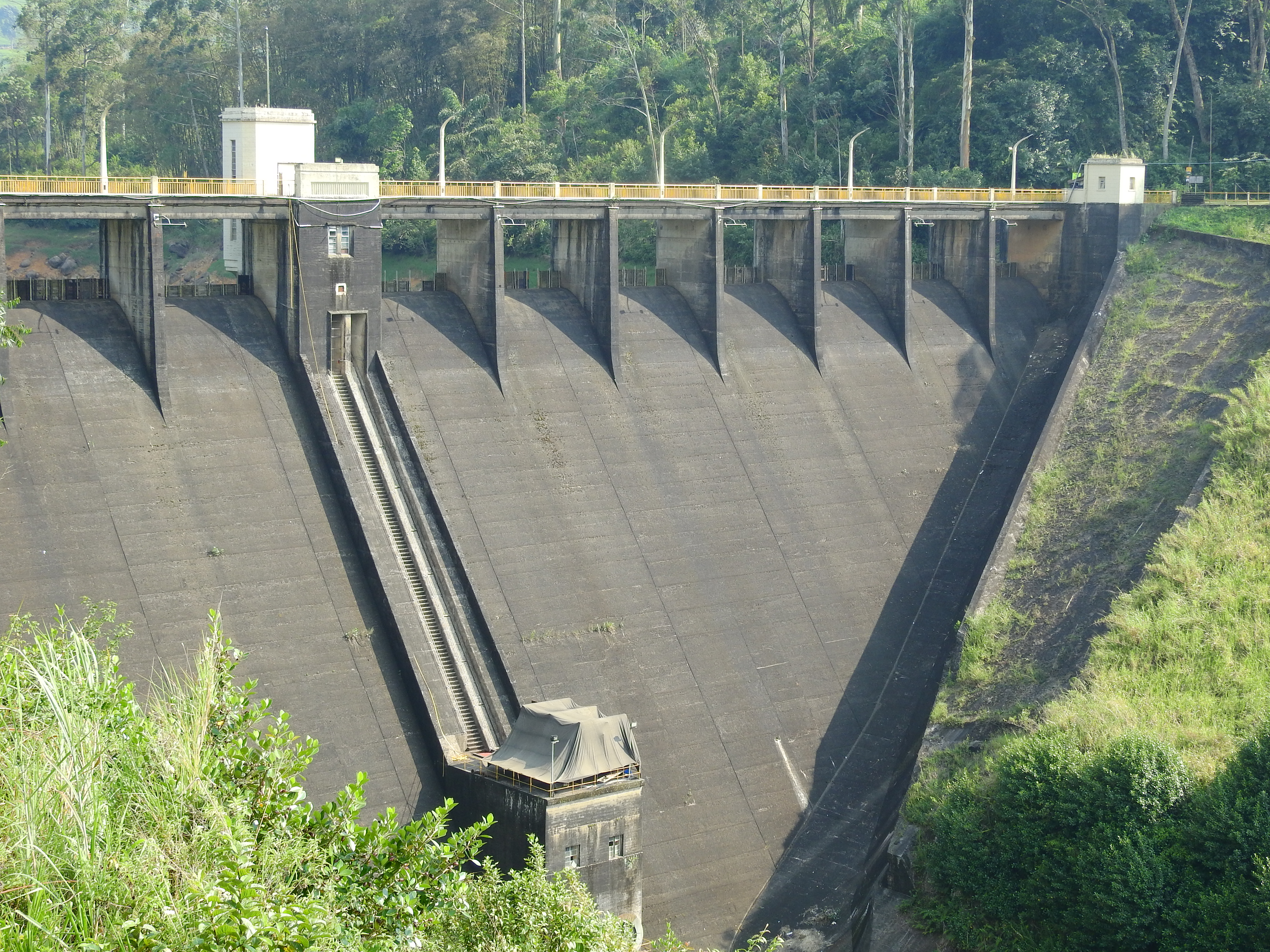

- Location within Sri Lanka
- Country: Sri Lanka
- Location: Hatton, Central Province
- Coordinates: 06°52′24″N 80°33′59″E
- Purpose: Power
- Status: Operational
- Opening date: January 1965
- Owner: CEB

Dam and spillways
- Type of dam: Gravity dam
- Impounds: Kehelgamu Oya

Wimalasurendra Power Station
- Coordinates: 06°54′31″N 80°31′30″E
- Turbines: 2 × 25 MW
- Installed capacity: 50 MW

The Castlereigh Dam (also spelled Castlereagh) is a gravity dam built across the Kehelgamu Oya, a major tributary to the Kelani River, approximately 3 km (1.9 mi) south-west of Hatton, in the Central Province of Sri Lanka. The dam is a popular location for both locals and tourists.

Castlereagh was named after Lord Castlereagh, 2nd Marquess of Londonderry (1769-1822), an Irish/British politician, who served as the British Foreign Secretary between 1812 and 1822.

== Reservoir and power station ==
The dam creates the iconic Castlereigh Reservoir, which is almost entirely maintained by the inflow of water from the Kehalgamu Oya. Water from the reservoir is diverted to the Wimalasurendra Power Station, located approximately 12 km (7.5 mi) downstream at 06°54′31″N 80°31′30″E, near Norton Bridge. The power station discharges the water into the Norton Reservoir, created by the Norton Dam, located at the same site.

The power station consists of two 25-megawatt units, for the combined plant capacity of 50 MW. Both units were commissioned in January 1965.

== Water airport ==
The Castlereigh Reservoir is also home to the Castlereigh Water Airport, registered under the IATA code NUF. The water aerodrome provides seaplane services, including scenic flights and transfers between major airports and inland water bodies.

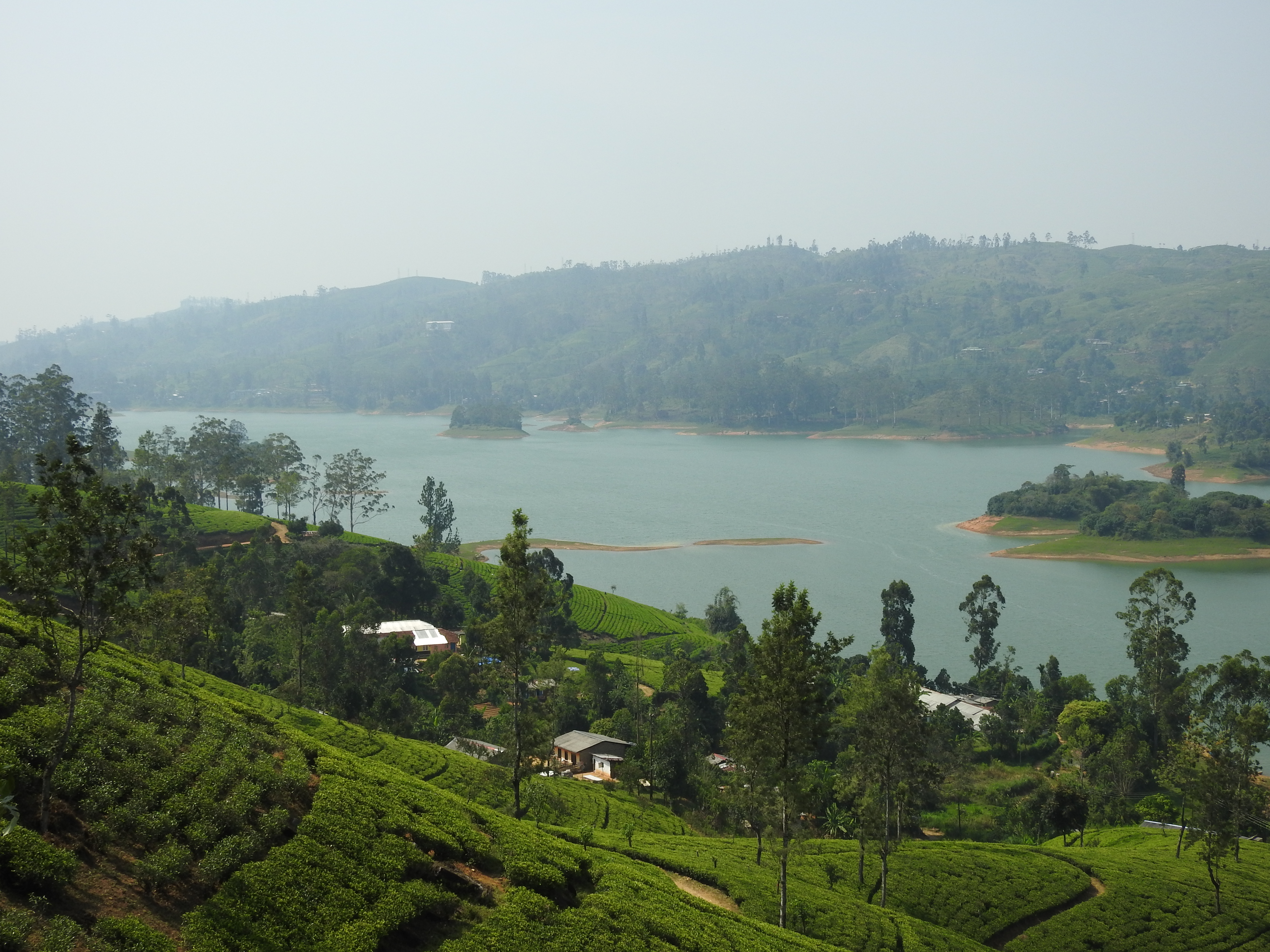
Castlereigh Reservoir in March 2018.

== See also ==
- List of dams and reservoirs in Sri Lanka
- List of power stations in Sri Lanka
