= Canyon Dam (Sri Lanka) =

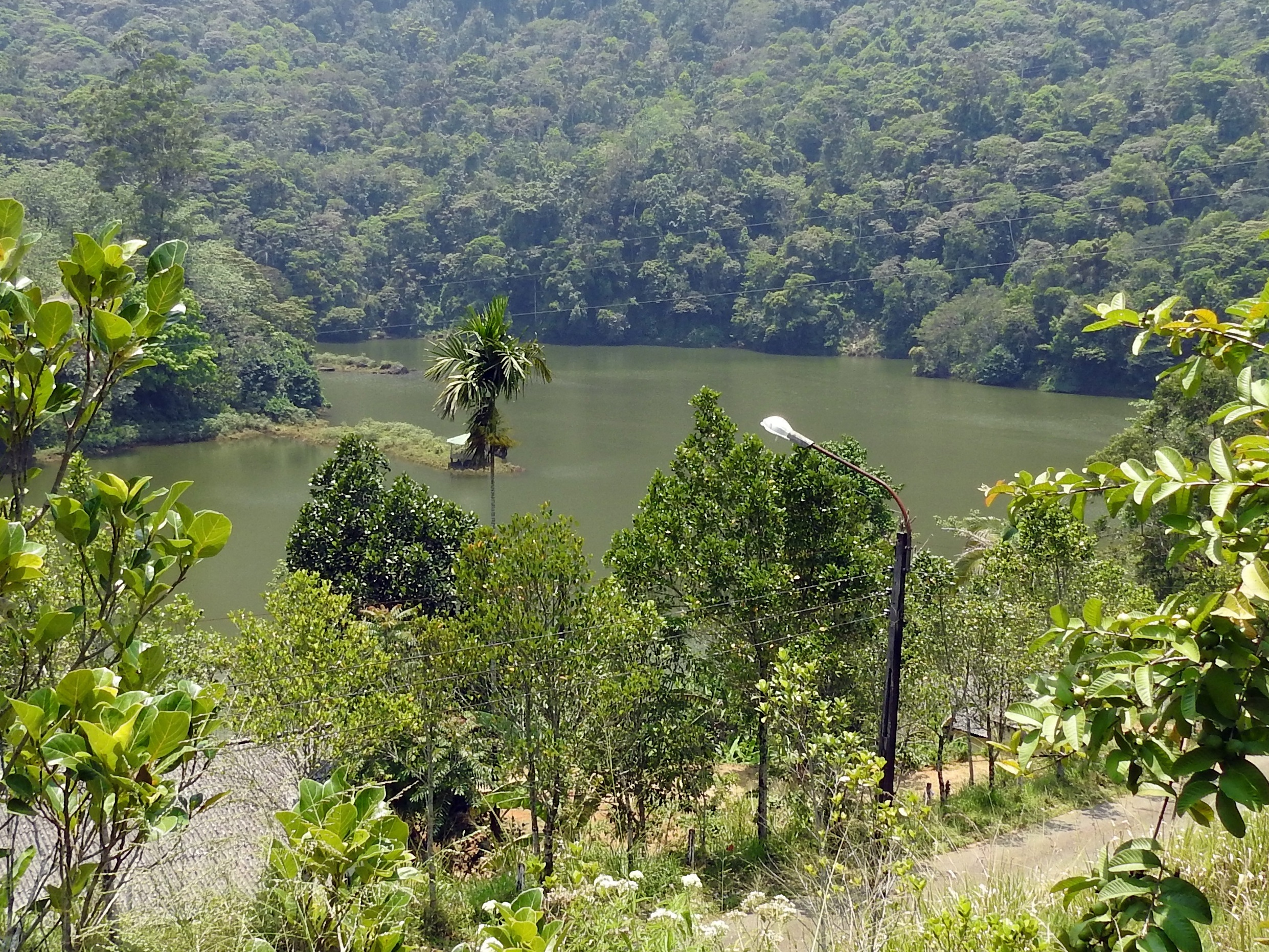
- Canyon Reservoir in March 2018

- Location within Sri Lanka
- Country: Sri Lanka
- Location: Laxapana Falls, Nuwara Eliya district, Central Province
- Coordinates: 06°52′18″N 80°31′34″E
- Purpose: Power
- Status: Operational
- Opening date: February 1974
- Owner: Ceylon Electricity Board

Dam and spillways
- Type of dam: Arch-gravity dam
- Impounds: Maskeliya Oya

Reservoir
- Creates: Canyon Reservoir
- Maximum length: 450 m (1,480 ft)
- Maximum width: 350 m (1,150 ft)

New Laxapana Power Station
- Coordinates: 06°55′05″N 80°29′31″E
- Type: Conventional
- Turbines: 2 × 50 MW
- Installed capacity: 100 MW

The Canyon Dam is a large arch-gravity dam built across the Maskeliya Oya, 4.5 km (2.8 mi) upstream of the iconic Laxapana Falls, in the Central Province of Sri Lanka. The associated power station plays a major role in the national power grid, due to its significant output. The dam is surrounded by steel structures of the substation.

== Reservoir and power station ==
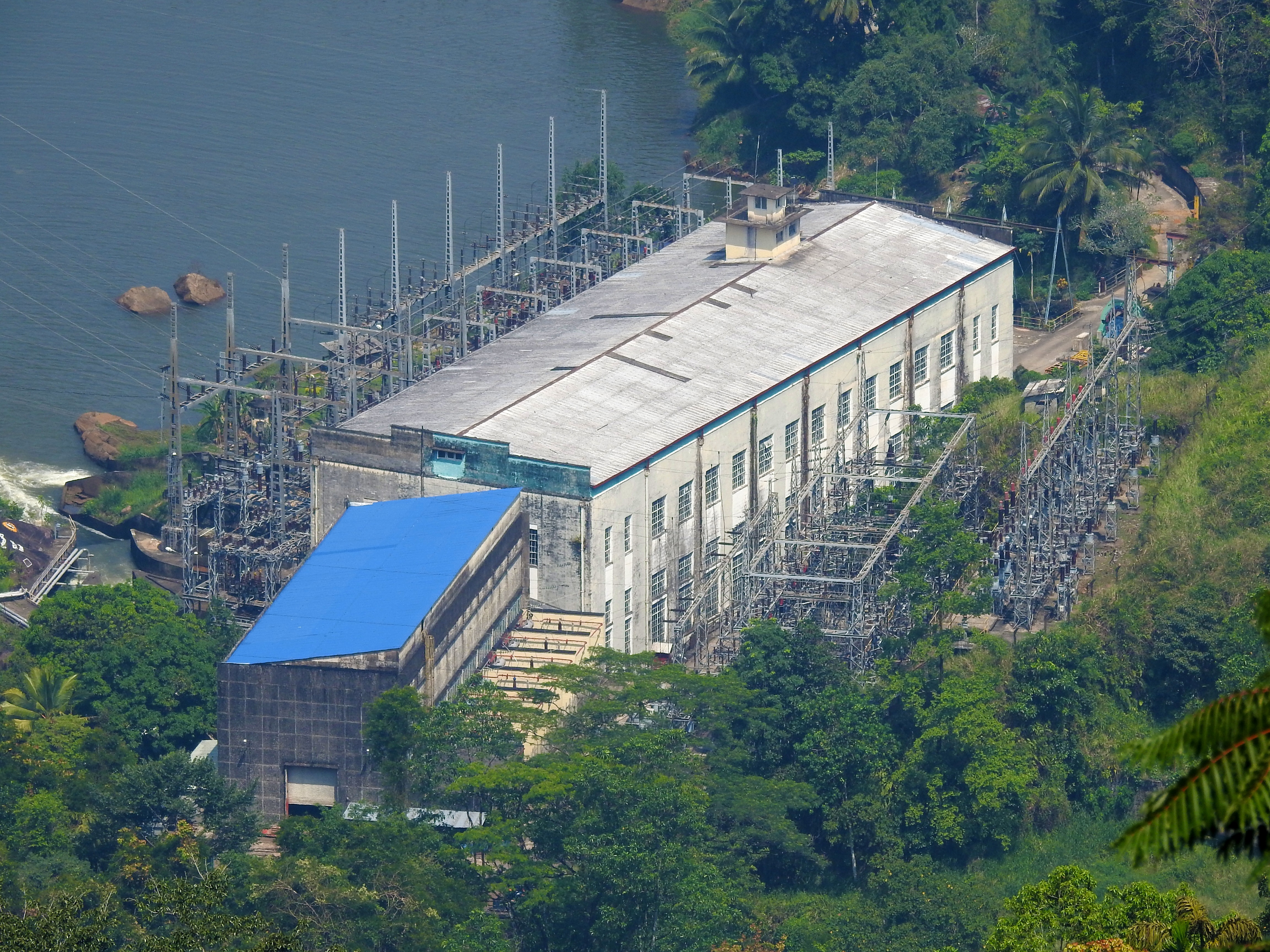
Water from the Canyon Dam is channelled through penstocks to the New Laxapana Power Station (blue-roofed building).

The dam creates the relatively small Canyon Reservoir, measuring at 450 m (1,480 ft) and 350 m (1,150 ft) in its longest length and width, respectively. The reservoir's primary source of water is the Maskeliya Oya, with additional water discharged from the Canyon HPower Station, located at the same site.

Water from the Canyon Reservoir is further transferred through a penstock to the New Laxapana Power Station, located 7 km (4.3 mi) downstream, at 06°55′05″N 80°29′31″E, 1.5 km (0.9 mi) northwest of Kiriwan Eliya. The power station consists of two hydroelectric generators of 50 MW each. Both generators were commissioned in February 1974.

== See also ==
- List of dams and reservoirs in Sri Lanka
- List of power stations in Sri Lanka
