= Kelani River =

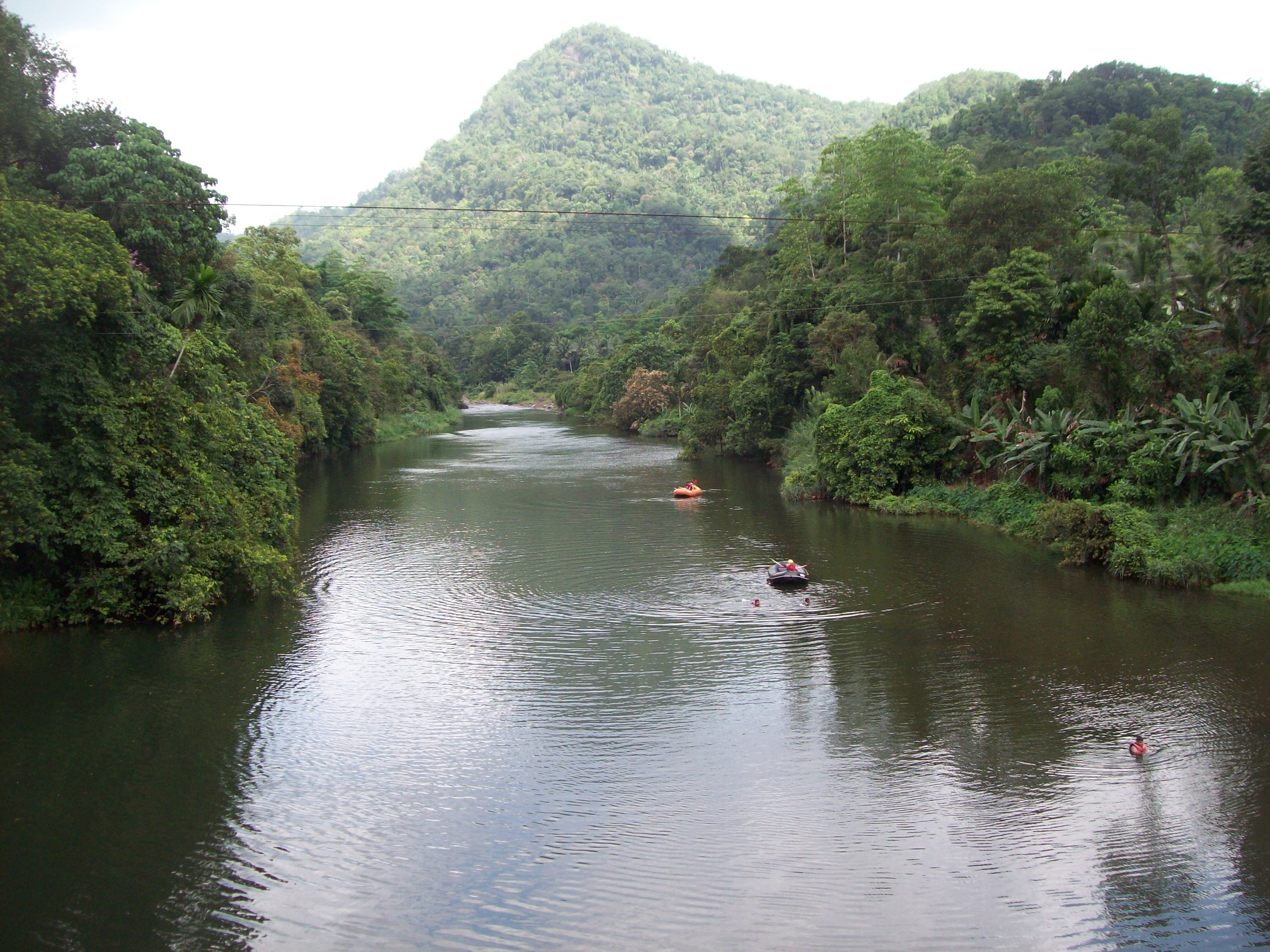
- Kelani River, near Kitulgala
- Native name: කැළණි ගඟ (Sinhala); Kelani Ganga (Sinhala); கேளனி கங்கை (Tamil); Kelani Gangai (Tamil)

Location
- Country: Sri Lanka
- Major cities: Kitulgala, Avissawella, Kelaniya, Colombo

Physical characteristics
- Source: Horton Plains National Park
- Mouth: Indian Ocean
  - location: Colombo
  - coordinates: 06°58′44″N 79°52′12″E
- Length: 145 km (90 mi)
- Discharge
  - minimum: 20–25 m^{3}/s (710–880 cu ft/s) (dry season)
  - maximum: 800–1,500 m^{3}/s (28,000–53,000 cu ft/s) (monsoon)

The Kelani River (Sinhala: කැළණි ගඟ) is a 145-kilometre-long (90 mi) river in Sri Lanka. The fourth-longest river in the country, it stretches from the Sri Pada Mountain Range to Colombo. It flows through or borders the Sri Lankan districts of Nuwara Eliya, Ratnapura, Kegalle, Gampaha and Colombo. The Kelani River also flows through the capital of Sri Lanka, Colombo, and provides 80% of its drinking water.

== Hydrology ==
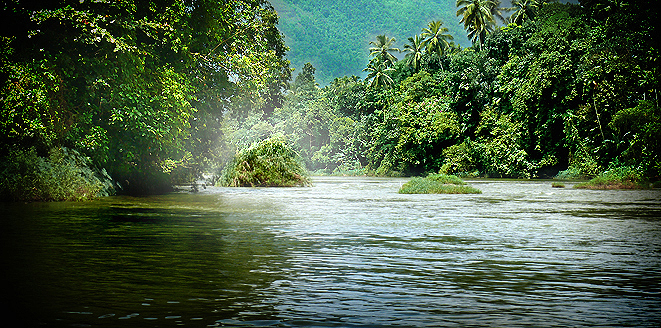

The Kelani River has two main tributaries in its upper reaches: the Kehelgamu Oya and the Maskeli Oya. These two contribute to hydro-electric production in Sri Lanka, housing several major reservoirs, ponds and power stations. Castlereigh Reservoir and Norton Reservoir are constructed across the Kehelgamu Oya, while Maskeliya Reservoir, Canyon Reservoir and Laxapana Reservoir are constructed across the Maskeli Oya. In its lower reaches, some more tributaries connect to the Kelani River, out of which the most famous are the We Oya at Yatiyanthota, the Gurugoda Oya at Ruwanwella, and the Seethawaka Ganga at Avissawella.

== Hydrometry and usage ==
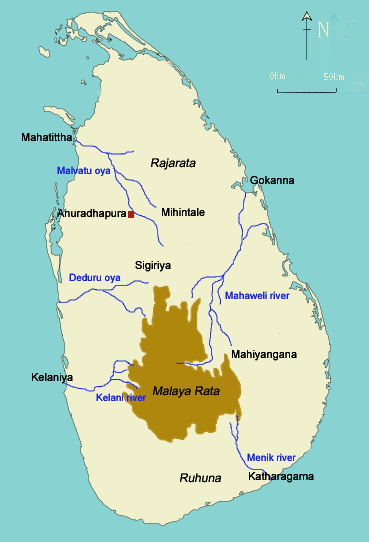
Map of Sri Lanka; Kelani River in the southwest

The Kelani supplies approximately 80% of the water used in Colombo. In addition, the river is used for transport, fisheries, sewage disposal, sand mining and for production of hydroelectricity. Through these factors, many people depend on the river for their daily routine in life. Depending on the operation of three reservoirs, the river flow varies from 20 m^{3}/s (706 cu ft/s) to 25 m^{3}/s (883 cu ft/s) in the dry seasons, and 800 m^{3}/s (28,252 cu ft/s) to 1,500 m^{3}/s (52,972 cu ft/s) during the monsoons. The annual sand extraction from the river is approximately 600,000 m^{2} (6,458,346 ft^{2}) to 800,000 m^{2} (8,611,128 ft^{2}). From a barge, people dive to the river bed, from where the sand is lifted to the barge in a bucket, and when the barge is full, it is taken to the river bank and unloaded by a separate team. The sand mining causes the river bed to sink by approximately 10 cm (4 in) per year. At present, two main concerns in connection with the river are flooding during the monsoon and saline intrusion in the dry season.

In addition, Kelani River water levels affect the flood risk to Colombo, the capital of Sri Lanka, to a considerable extent. One reason is that part of the city and suburbs of Colombo lie on the lower flood plain of the river. Exposure of Colombo and the upper catchments of Kelani River to the South West Monsoon is another reason.

The problems are related: the saline intrusion is enhanced by the deepening of the river caused by sand mining. Regulation, in order to prevent saline intrusion, can reduce the water quality in other ways, and can increase the flood risk. Sand mining is economically important nationally and to the many people involved.

The Kelani stream flow was investigated just upstream of Ambatale at Hanwella, with engineers analyzing the river discharges from 1973 to 2004 (in million m^{3}/month).

== Cultural references ==
Kelani River is connected closely with the Sinhala Buddhist culture of Sri Lanka, especially with the people living on the area identified as the Kelani Valley. This derives primarily from the fact that the Kelani River is associated with two of the most venerated Buddhist shrines and pilgrimages, i.e. Sri Pada Mountain and Kelani Raja Maha Viharaya. There are a number of folk poems that mention the Kelani River, such as the following:

=== Folk poem ===
ඔන්න මලේ ඔය නා මල නෙළා වරෙන්
අත්ත බිඳෙයි පය බුරුලෙන් තබා වරෙන්
කැලණි ගඟේ ඔරු යනවා බලා වරෙන්
සාදුකාර දී ඔරුවක නැගී වරෙන්

=== Hansa Sandeshaya ===
සමනොළ මුදුන සිරිපද ඔබන මගුලට
නිකසල මහ සඟන ගෙන වඩින මුනිඳුට
පැහැදුල සුනිල් මිණියෙන් කළ මග ලෙස
මනදොළ පිරෙයි ගඟ සිරිසර දුටු තොපට

The Kalyani Ordination Hall in Bago, Myanmar derives its name from the Kelani River.

== Special features ==
The Academy Award-winning The Bridge on the River Kwai was filmed on the Kelani River near Kitulgala, although nothing remains now except the concrete foundations for the bridge (and, supposedly, the submerged train cars that plunged into the river in the climactic scene).

== Bridges over Kelani River ==
The following table shows the major bridges over the Kelani River:

Name of Bridge	Location	Road	Length	Year of Completion
Mattakkuliya Bridge	6° 58.847', 79° 52.505'	Mattakkuliya-Hekitta Road	xxx	xxx
Sri Lanka - Japan Friendship Bridge	6° 57.625', 79° 52.712'	Madampitiya-Peliyagoda Road	xxx	xxx
New Kelani Bridge	6° 57.268', 79° 52.960'	Colombo-Kandy Road	275m	1959
Railway Bridge	6° 57.280', 79° 53.384'	Main Railway Line	xxx	xxx
Kelanisiri Bridge	6° 56.974', 79° 55.218'	Kelanimulla-Kelaniya Road	130m	2008
Pattivila Bridge	06°56′31.5″N 79°57′30.3″E	N/A	125	xxx
OCH Bridge	6° 56.276', 79° 58.311'	Outer Circular Highway	xxx	In construction
Kaduwela Bridge	6° 56.175', 79° 59.113'	Kaduwela-Kandy Road	xxx	xxx
Nawagamuwa Bridge	6° 55.511', 80° 1.190'	Nawagamuwa-Mapitigama Road	xxx	xxx
Hanwella Bridge	6° 54.601', 80° 5.001'	Hanwella-Urapola Road	xxx	xxx
Pugoda Bridge	6° 58.404', 80° 7.401'	Kosgama-Pugoda Road	xxx	xxx
Gurugalla Bridge	6° 59.730', 80° 12.835'	Talduwa-Meewitigammana Road	xxx	xxx
Karawanella Bridge	7° 1.208', 80° 15.748'	Colombo-Hatton Road	xxx	xxx
Garagoda Bridge	7° 1.684', 80° 17.652'	Yatiyantota-Magammana Road	xxx	xxx
Behenella Bridge	6° 59.792', 80° 21.593'	Thaligama-Behenella Road	xxx	In construction

== See also ==
- Geography of Sri Lanka
- List of rivers in Sri Lanka
- Kelani River-Peliyagoda Waterdrome
- Biyagama Water Treatment Plant
