= Norton Dam =

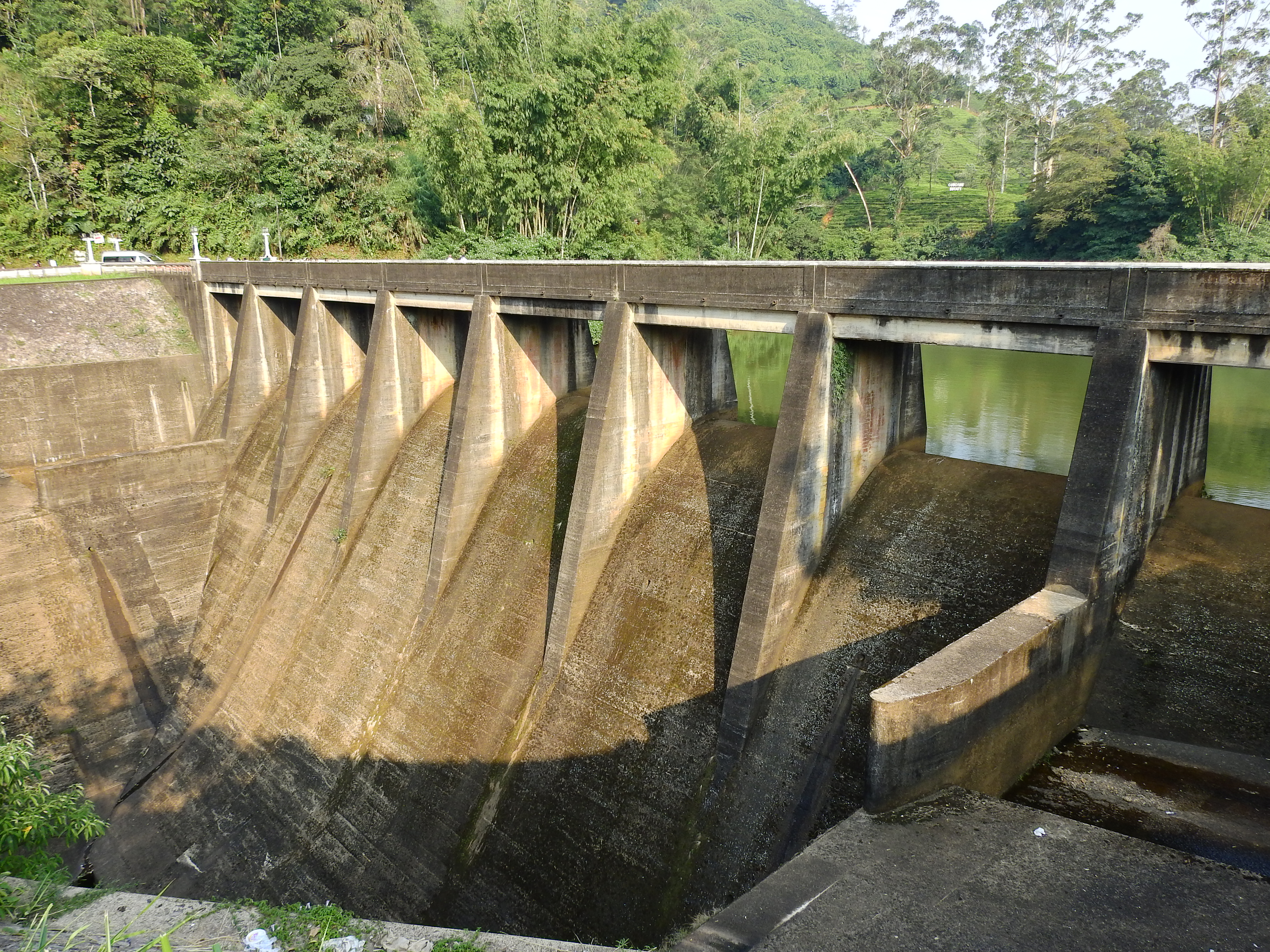

- Location within Sri Lanka
- Country: Sri Lanka
- Location: Norton Bridge, Central Province
- Coordinates: 06°54′50″N 80°31′18″E
- Purpose: Power
- Status: Operational
- Construction began: 1924
- Opening date: December 1950
- Owner: Ceylon Electricity Board

Dam and spillways
- Type of dam: Gravity dam
- Impounds: Kehelgamu Oya
- Length: 103 m (338 ft)
- Elevation at crest: 873 m (2,864 ft) MASL

Reservoir
- Creates: Norton Reservoir
- Total capacity: 390,000 m^{3} (14,000,000 ft^{3})
- Catchment area: 19.4 km^{2} (7.5 mi^{2})
- Surface area: 0.15 km^{2} (0.058 mi^{2})
- Maximum length: 650 m (2,130 ft)
- Maximum width: 280 m (920 ft)

Old Laxapana Power Station
- Coordinates: 06°55′07″N 80°29′30″E
- Operator: Ceylon Electricity Board
- Type: Conventional
- Turbines: 3 × 8.33 MW; 2 × 12.50 MW
- Installed capacity: 50 MW

The Norton Dam (also sometimes called the Norton Bridge Dam) is a gravity dam built across the Kehelgamu Oya, which is a main tributary to the Kelani River. The dam is built at Norton Bridge, in the Central Province of Sri Lanka.

== Reservoir and power station ==
The dam creates the relatively small Norton Reservoir, which is sustained by water from the Kehelgamu Oya, and water discharged from the Wimalasurendra Hydroelectric Power Station, which is located upstream of the reservoir. The Wimalasurendra Power Station or the Norton Bridge Power station is fed from the reservoir at Castlereigh Dam about 610 m (2,000 ft) above the Norton Reservoir.

Water from the Norton Reservoir is further channelled through a Tunnel through the rock strata and then by a couple of steel pipes penstock to the Old Laxapana Hydroelectric Power Station, located 3.8 km (2.4 mi) downstream at 06°55′07″N 80°29′30″E, 1.5 km (0.9 mi) northwest of Kiriwan Eliya. The power station consists of five hydroelectric generators, three of which are rated at 8.33 MW, and two of which are 12.50 MW. The first three and last two units were commissioned in December 1950 and December 1958, respectively.

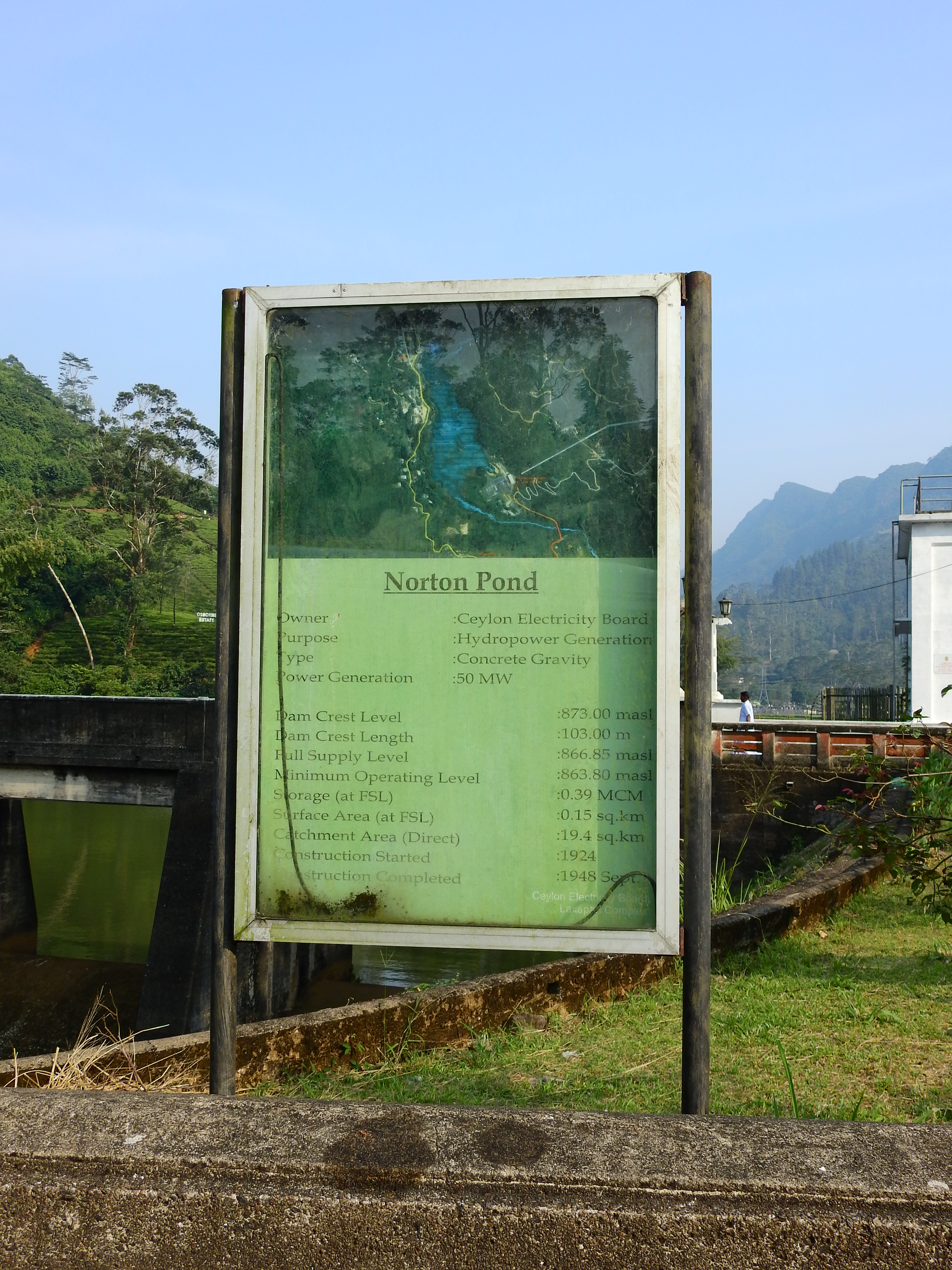
Details of the reservoir posted at the dam site.

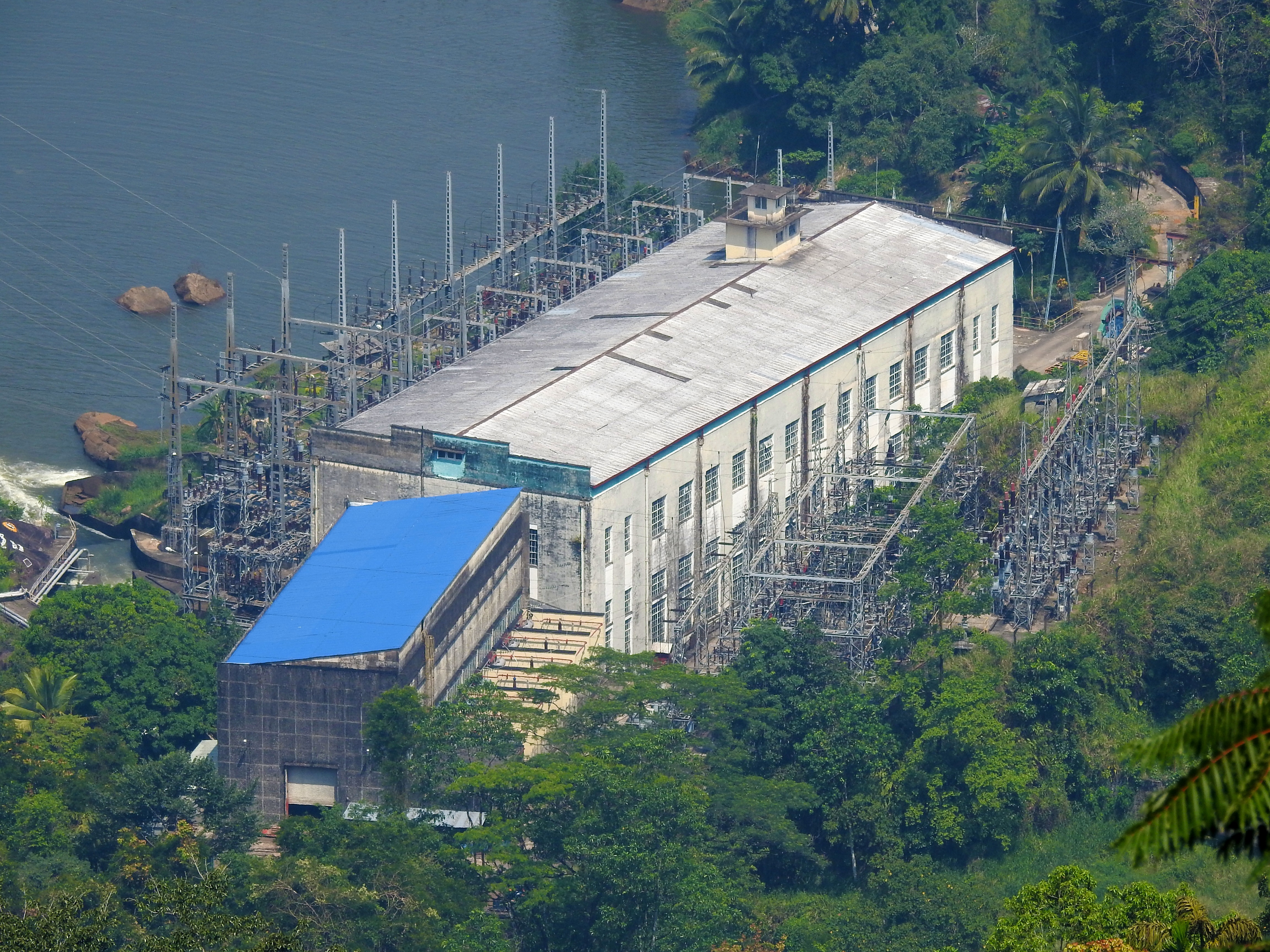
The Old Laxapana Power Station (white roof).

== See also ==
- List of dams and reservoirs in Sri Lanka
- List of power stations in Sri Lanka
