= Colombo South Waste Processing Facility =

Power station under construction in Sri Lanka

- Country: Sri Lanka
- Coordinates: 6°48′57″N 79°54′11″E
- Status: Under construction
- Construction began: 23 August 2017
- Construction cost: $91 million (2017)
- Owner: Fairway Holdings
- Operator: Fairway Waste Management

Thermal power station
- Primary fuel: Municipal solid waste
- Site area: 10 acres (4.0 ha)
- Feed-in tariff: 37.1 Sri Lankan rupee (per kilowatt-hour)

Power generation
- Nameplate capacity: 10 MW

External links
- Website: fairwaywastemanagement.com/karadiyana-w2e/

The Colombo South Waste Processing Facility (also referred to as the Karadiyana W2E Project or Karadiyana Power Station) is a municipal solid waste-fired thermal power station currently under construction at a 10-acre (40,000 m^{2}) site in Karadiyana, Sri Lanka. Together with the KCHT Power Station, it is one of two projects that won the bid by the Urban Development Authority, from a pool of 121 bidders. Construction of the facility began on 23 August 2017 with a completion slated for mid-2019. The estimated cost of the project is approximately US$91 million.

The 10 megawatt power station will be operated by Fairway Waste Management (Private) Limited, a subsidiary of the Fairway Holdings. It will use 500 metric tons (1,100,000 lb) of waste, with the generated power sold to the state-owned Ceylon Electricity Board at a rate of Rs. 37.10 per KWh generated. The residual bottom ash from the process will be used for road construction and other uses, while the unusable fly ash (amounting to 2%) will be disposed of at predesignated locations.

== See also ==
- List of power stations in Sri Lanka
- Muthurajawela wetlands
