= Mampuri Wind Farms =

Group of wind farms in Sri Lanka

Mampuri Wind Farm
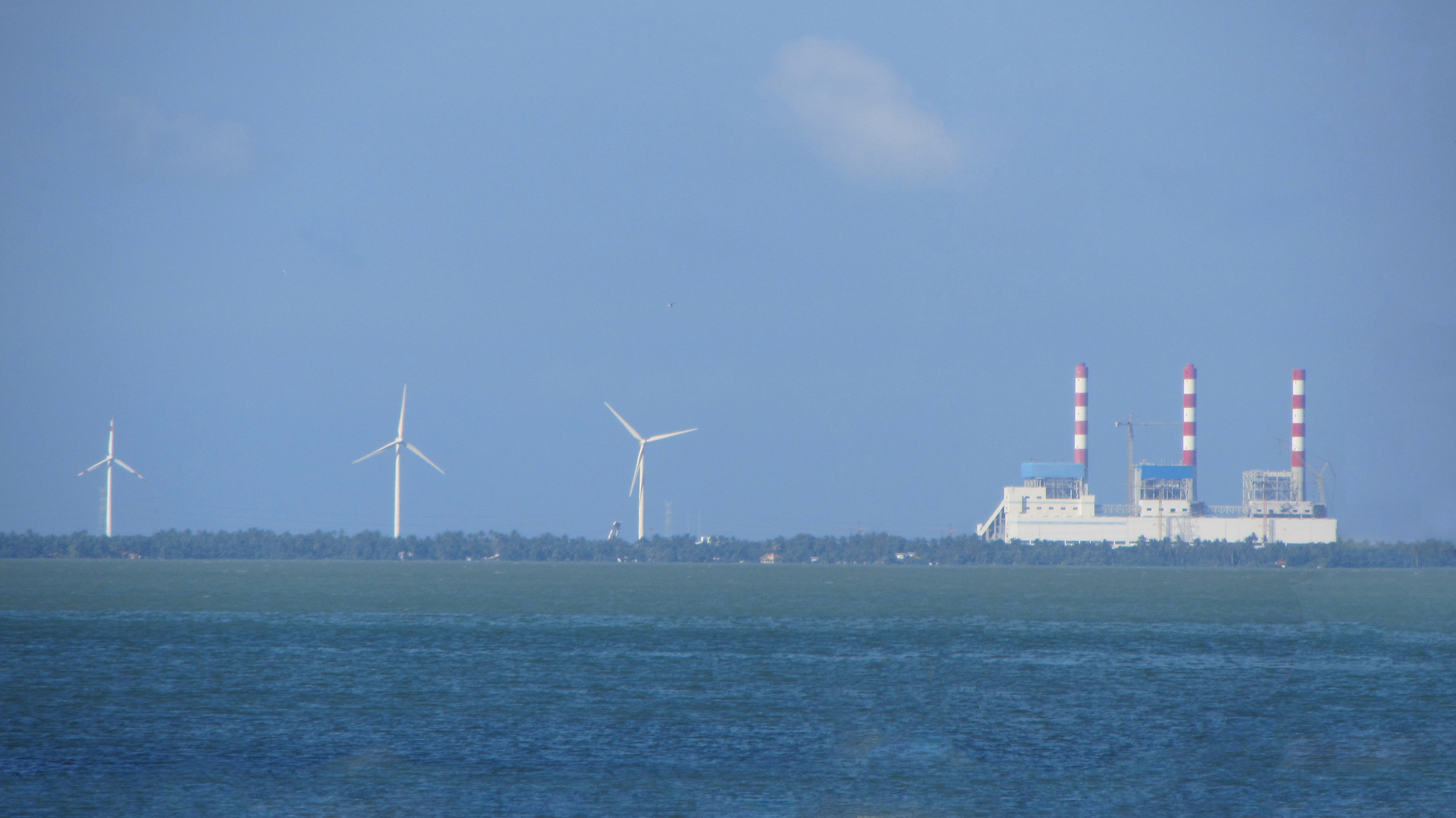
- Two wind turbines belonging to Mampuri-I (right), and one turbine belonging to the Narakkaliya Wind Farm (left), near the Lakvijaya Power Station.
- Country: Sri Lanka
- Location: Kalpitiya, Puttalam
- Coordinates: 08°00′37″N 79°43′24″E
- Status: Operational
- Construction began: 2009
- Commission date: 22 March 2010 (Mampuri-I)
- Owner: Senok

Wind farm
- Type: Onshore
- Site usage: Vegetable cultivation
- Hub height: 80 m (262 ft)
- Rotor diameter: 88 m (289 ft)
- Rated wind speed: 14 m/s (45.9 ft/s)
- Site elevation: Sea-level

Power generation
- Units operational: 08 × 1.25 MW; 10 × 2.1 MW
- Make and model: 08 × Suzlon S64-1.25MW; 10 × Suzlon S88-2.1MW
- Nameplate capacity: 31 MW
- Capacity factor: 26.59%

External links
- Website: www.senoksl.com
- Commons: Related media on Commons

The Mampuri Wind Farms (also known as the Senok Wind Farms, after its developers) are a set of three wind farms located near the Lakvijaya Power Station, on the Kalpitiya peninsula, in Mampuri, Puttalam District, Sri Lanka. The wind farms, referred to as Mampuri-I, Mampuri-II, and Mampuri-III, was built successively, and consists of eighteen Suzlon wind turbines ranging from 1.25 MW to 2.10 MW. Mampuri-I was commissioned on 22 March 2010, and was the first wind farm in the country to reach the 10 MW installed capacity threshold. As the government only allows projects up to 10 MW, the three wind farms are registered under three different company names, namely Senok Wind Power, Senok Wind Energy, and Senok Wind Resource.

== Mampuri-I ==
Mampuri-I is built on a 5 km (3.1 mi) strip of land, and utilizes eight Suzlon S64-1.25MW wind turbines with rotor diameters of 64 m (210 ft) at rated wind speeds of 14 m/s (45.9 ft/s). Per the government's standardized power purchase agreement, the Ceylon Electricity Board pays Senok Rs. 20 (approximately US$ 0.176) for every kilowatt hour generated for the first eight years, followed by an adjusted rate thereafter. This phase created 40 jobs in the region, and cost Rs.3bn (US$ 26mn) to build. 55% of this was directly funded by Senok, with the remainder was funded by the World Bank.

Turbine locations of Mampuri-I
Turbine	Coordinates
Turbine 1	08°00′37″N 79°43′24″E
Turbine 2	08°00′26″N 79°43′27″E
Turbine 3	08°00′09″N 79°43′33″E
Turbine 4	07°59′34″N 79°43′38″E
Turbine 5	07°59′23″N 79°43′43″E
Turbine 6	07°59′13″N 79°43′45″E
Turbine 7	07°59′00″N 79°43′48″E
Turbine 8	07°58′48″N 79°44′00″E

== Mampuri-II and Mampuri-III ==
Mampuri-II and Mampuri-III were constructed almost simultaneously after Mampuri-I. These wind farms utilizes five Suzlon S88-2.1 MW wind turbines each. The wind turbines measures 80 m (262 ft) tall, with rotor diameters of 88 m (289 ft), and has rated wind speed of 14 m/s (45.9 ft/s).

Turbine locations of Mampuri-II
Turbine	Coordinates
Turbine 1	07°58′35″N 79°43′53″E
Turbine 2	07°58′23″N 79°43′57″E
Turbine 3	07°58′06″N 79°44′02″E
Turbine 4	07°58′19″N 79°44′30″E
Turbine 5	07°58′52″N 79°44′09″E

Turbine locations of Mampuri-III
Turbine	Coordinates
Turbine 1	08°00′35″N 79°43′44″E
Turbine 2	08°00′19″N 79°43′50″E
Turbine 3	08°00′05″N 79°44′02″E
Turbine 4	07°59′40″N 79°44′09″E
Turbine 5	07°59′23″N 79°44′03″E

== See also ==
- Electricity in Sri Lanka
- List of power stations in Sri Lanka
