= Sagasolar Power Station =

Solar power station in Hambantota, Sri Lanka

- Country: Sri Lanka
- Location: Hambantota
- Coordinates: 6°13′54″N 81°05′08″E
- Status: Operational
- Commission date: December 2016
- Owner: Sagasolar Power

Solar farm
- Type: Standard PV
- Site area: 45 acres (18 ha)

Power generation
- Make and model: Solon SE (48000)
- Nameplate capacity: 10 MW
- Annual net output: 19 GWh

The Sagasolar Power Station is a solar photovoltaic power station built next to the Hambantota Solar Power Station, in Hambantota, Sri Lanka. The solar farm is owned and developed by Sagasolar, a fully owned subsidiary of Aitken Spence, with 70% debt funded by DFCC Bank, Commercial Bank of Ceylon, and Hatton National Bank. The 10-megawatt facility is expected to generate approximately 19GWh annually for at least 25 years.

48,000 solar panels manufactured by Solon International are utilized in the solar farm, which extends 45 acres (18 ha), within a zone declared for solar power developments by the Sri Lanka Sustainable Energy Authority.

== See also ==
- List of power stations in Sri Lanka
