= List of power stations in Sri Lanka =

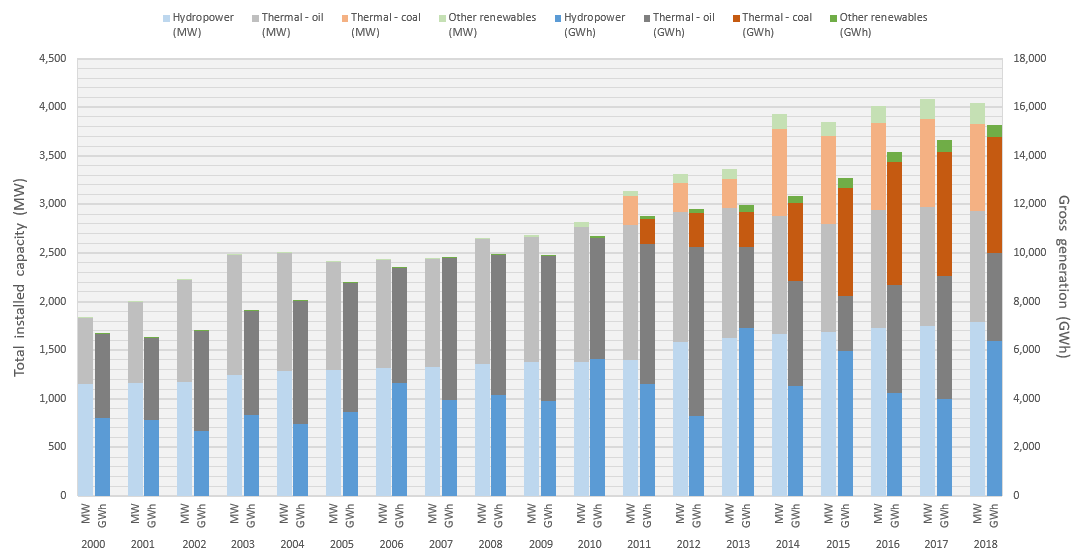
The installed electrical capacity and production of Sri Lanka by sources, from 2000 to 2018

Sri Lanka's electricity demand is currently met by nine thermal power stations, fifteen large hydroelectric power stations, and fifteen wind farms, with a smaller share from small hydro facilities and other renewables such as solar. Most hydroelectric and thermal/fossil fuel–based power stations in the country are owned and/or operated by the government via the state-run Ceylon Electricity Board (CEB), while the renewable energy sector consists mostly of privately run plants operating on a power purchase agreement with the CEB.

Per CEB's 2016 generation report released in mid-2017, the country has a total combined installed generation capacity of 4,017 megawatts (MW), of which 2,115 MW (52.65%) was from thermal (900 MW/22.40% from coal and 1,215 MW/30.25% from fuel oil), 1,726 MW (42.97%) from hydroelectricity, and the remaining 176 MW (4.38%) from other renewable sources such as wind, biomass, and solar. These generation sources produced a total of 14,149 GWh of electricity during that year, of which 9,508 GWh (67.20%), 4,220 GWh (29.83%), and 421 GWh (2.98%) was from thermal, hydro, and other renewables, respectively.

== Non-renewable ==
As of 2015, 1,464 MW of the total thermal installed capacity was from state-owned fossil fuel power stations: 900 MW from Lakvijaya, 380 MW from the state-owned portion of Kelanitissa, 160 MW from Sapugaskanda, and 24 MW from Uthuru Janani. The remaining 641 MW of the installed thermal capacity are from six privately owned power stations. All thermal power stations run on fuel oil, except Lakvijaya, which run on coal.

In an attempt to lower the current consumer tariff for electricity, the government has decided not to renew the power purchase agreements of privately owned thermal power stations when their licences expire, as it has done with the six now-decommissioned private power producers listed below. The government will utilize the new Sampur plant combined with new renewable sources to accommodate the lost private-sector capacity, with plans to introduce nuclear power after 2030.

The 500 MW Sampur Power Station was in early stages of development since 2006, but was subsequently cancelled in 2016 due environmental concerns. Prior to its cancellation, the Ministry of Power and Renewable Energy also made a statement that no more coal-fired power stations will be commissioned, making Lakvijaya the only coal-fired power station in the country. Any future thermal power stations will also be natural gas–run, to reduce the nation's carbon footprint.

Coal-fired power stations in Sri Lanka
Station	Closest city	Location	Capacity (MW)	Owner	Notes	Ref
Lakvijaya	Puttalam	08°01′06″N 79°43′22″E	900	Government		
Sampur	Trincomalee	08°29′10″N 81°18′00″E	500	Government	Cancelled	

Oil-fired power stations in Sri Lanka
Station	Closest city	Location	Capacity (MW)	Owner	Notes	Ref
Kelanitissa	Colombo	06°57′14″N 79°52′37″E	360	Government		
Yugadanavi	Kerawalapitiya	07°00′40″N 79°52′30″E	300	Private		
Sobadhanavi	Kerawalapitiya	07°00′46″N 79°52′35″E	350	Private		
Sojitz Kelanitissa	Colombo	06°57′06″N 79°52′31″E	172	Private		
Sapugaskanda	Sapugaskanda	06°57′39″N 79°57′40″E	160	Government		
Ace Embilipitiya	Embilipitiya	06°17′06″N 80°50′56″E	100	Private	Decommissioned	
Heladhanavi	Puttalam	08°00′46″N 79°52′13″E	100	Private	Decommissioned	
Colombo Port	Colombo	06°57′12″N 79°51′21″E	60	Government		
Asia Power Sapugaskanda	Sapugaskanda	06°57′22″N 79°56′54″E	51	Private		
Northern Power	Chunnakam	09°44′19″N 80°02′04″E	36	Private		
Ace Horana	Horana	06°43′57″N 80°08′17″E	25	Private	Decommissioned	
Ace Matara	Matara	05°59′07″N 80°33′49″E	25	Private		
Lakdhanavi	Sapugaskanda	06°57′28″N 79°57′03″E	24	Private		
Uthuru Janani	Chunnakam	09°44′27″N 80°02′00″E	24	Government		
Aggreko	Chunnakam	09°44′25″N 80°02′06″E	20	Private	Decommissioned	
Koolair	Kankesanthurai	09°48′40″N 80°02′07″E	20	Private	Decommissioned	
Chunnakam	Chunnakam	09°44′30″N 80°02′03″E	14	Government	Decommissioned	

MSW-fired power stations in Sri Lanka
Station	Closest city	Location	Capacity (MW)	Owner	Notes	Ref
Aitken Spence	Colombo	07°00′56″N 79°52′14″E	10	Private	Completed	
Karadiyana	Colombo	06°48′57″N 79°54′11″E	10	Private	Under construction	
KCHT Lanka Jang	Colombo	07°00′59″N 79°52′14″E	10	Private	Under construction	

== Renewable ==
=== Hydroelectric ===
Hydroelectricity has played a very significant role in the national installed power capacity since it was introduced in the 1950s, with over 50% of the total grid capacity met by hydroelectricity in 2000–2010. Hydroelectricity was popularized as early as the 1920s by Devapura Jayasena Wimalasurendra, who is considered as the "father of hydropower" in Sri Lanka. It lost its majority share on the power grid when further thermal power stations were introduced in 2010. The hydropower resource in Sri Lanka is divided into two main regions based on water resource, namely the Mahaweli Complex and Laxapana Complex.

While most hydroelectric power stations are named after their water source (i.e. the name of the dam and/or reservoir), a number of facilities have different names due to the fact that they are located larger distances apart (connected via underground penstocks). Further information on each power station is included in the corresponding water source article (i.e. dam). Privately owned "small-hydro" facilities (which are limited to a maximum nameplate capacity of 10 MW by state policy), are excluded from this list.

Hydroelectric power stations in Sri Lanka
Station	Region	Water source	Location	Capacity (MW)	Commissioned	Ref
Maha Oya	Other	Maha Oya	07°06′39″N 80°28′33″E	600	2030	
Victoria	Mahaweli	Victoria	07°12′00″N 80°48′21″E	210	October 1984	
Kotmale	Mahaweli	Kotmale	07°07′41″N 80°34′42″E	201	April 1985	
Upper Kotmale	Mahaweli	Upper Kotmale	07°02′32″N 80°39′24″E	150	July 2012	
Randenigala	Mahaweli	Randenigala	07°12′08″N 80°55′35″E	126	July 1986	
Samanala	Other	Samanala	06°35′03″N 80°48′29″E	124	October 1992	
Uma Oya	Mahaweli	Dyraaba	06°46′09″N 81°05′43″E	120	February 2024	
New Laxapana	Laxapana	Canyon	06°55′05″N 80°29′31″E	100	March 1983	
Kukule Ganga	Other	Kukule Ganga	06°37′00″N 80°16′33″E	80	July 2003	
Polpitiya	Laxapana	Laxapana	06°58′40″N 80°27′24″E	75	February 1974	
Canyon	Laxapana	Maskeliya	06°52′09″N 80°31′40″E	60	March 1983	
Rantembe	Mahaweli	Rantembe	07°12′00″N 80°57′00″E	52	January 1990	
Wimalasurendra	Laxapana	Castlereigh	06°54′31″N 80°31′30″E	50	January 1965	
Old Laxapana	Laxapana	Norton	06°55′07″N 80°29′30″E	50	December 1950	
Bowatenna	Mahaweli	Bowatenna	07°39′51″N 80°40′38″E	40	January 1981	
Ukuwela	Mahaweli	Polgolla	07°23′56″N 80°39′08″E	40	July 1976	
Broadlands	Laxapana	Broadlands	06°59′01″N 80°25′34″E	35	2020	
Moragahakanda	Mahaweli	Moragahakanda	07°41′59″N 80°46′11″E	25	July 2016	
Inginiyagala	Other	Gal Oya	07°39′50″N 80°40′39″E	11	1951	
Udawalawe	Other	Udawalawe	06°25′55″N 80°51′02″E	6	April 1969	
Nilambe	Mahaweli	Nilambe	07°11′48″N 80°36′44″E	3.2	July 1988	
Deduru Oya	Other	Deduru Oya	07°43′06″N 80°16′28″E	1.5	November 2014	

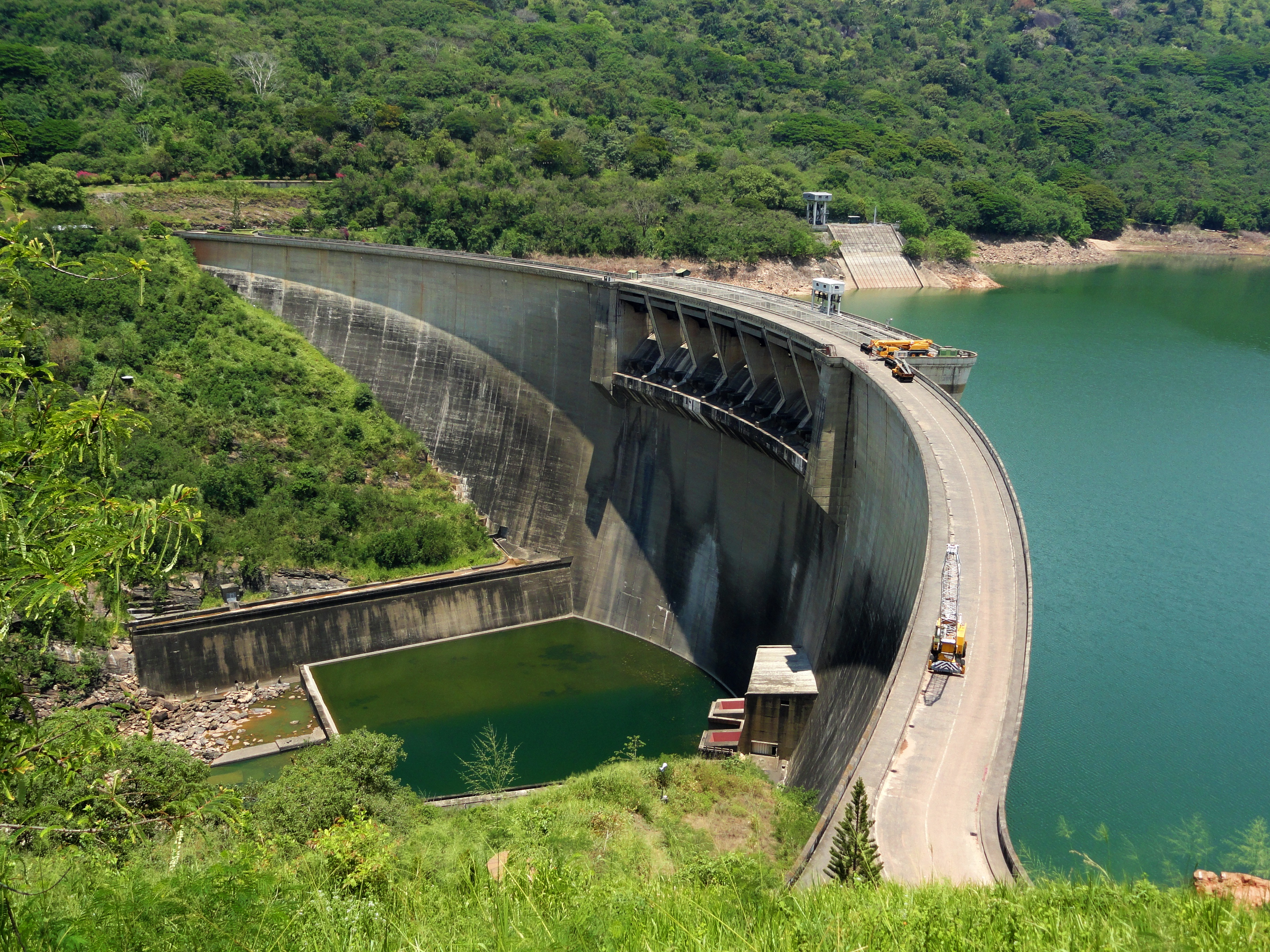
The Victoria Dam fuels the single largest hydroelectric power station in the country, with 210 MW of installed capacity. Shown here is the dam during dry season, 2011.

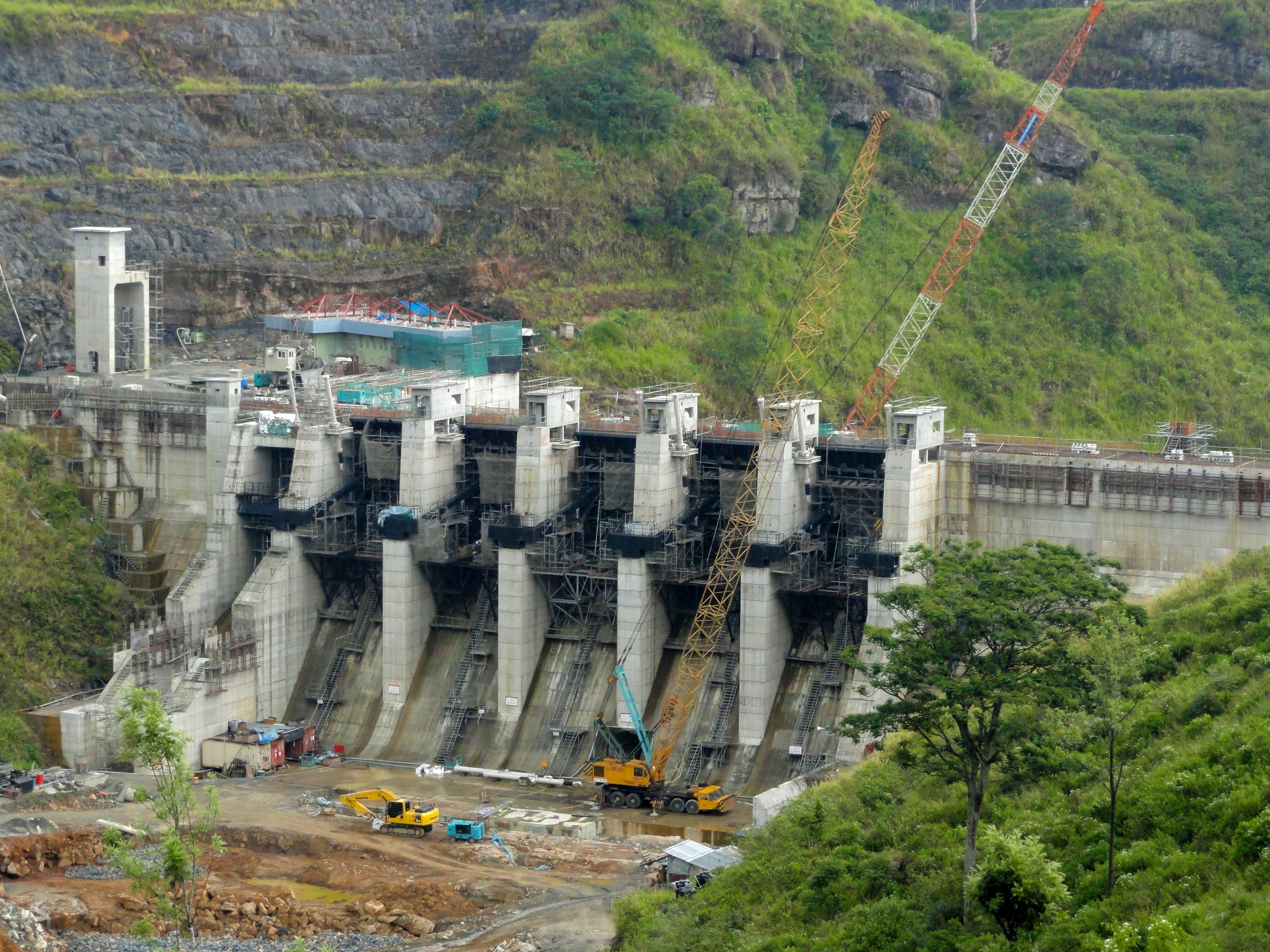
The Upper Kotmale Dam under construction in April 2011. The dam is now complete and powers its 150 MW power station located 13 km away.

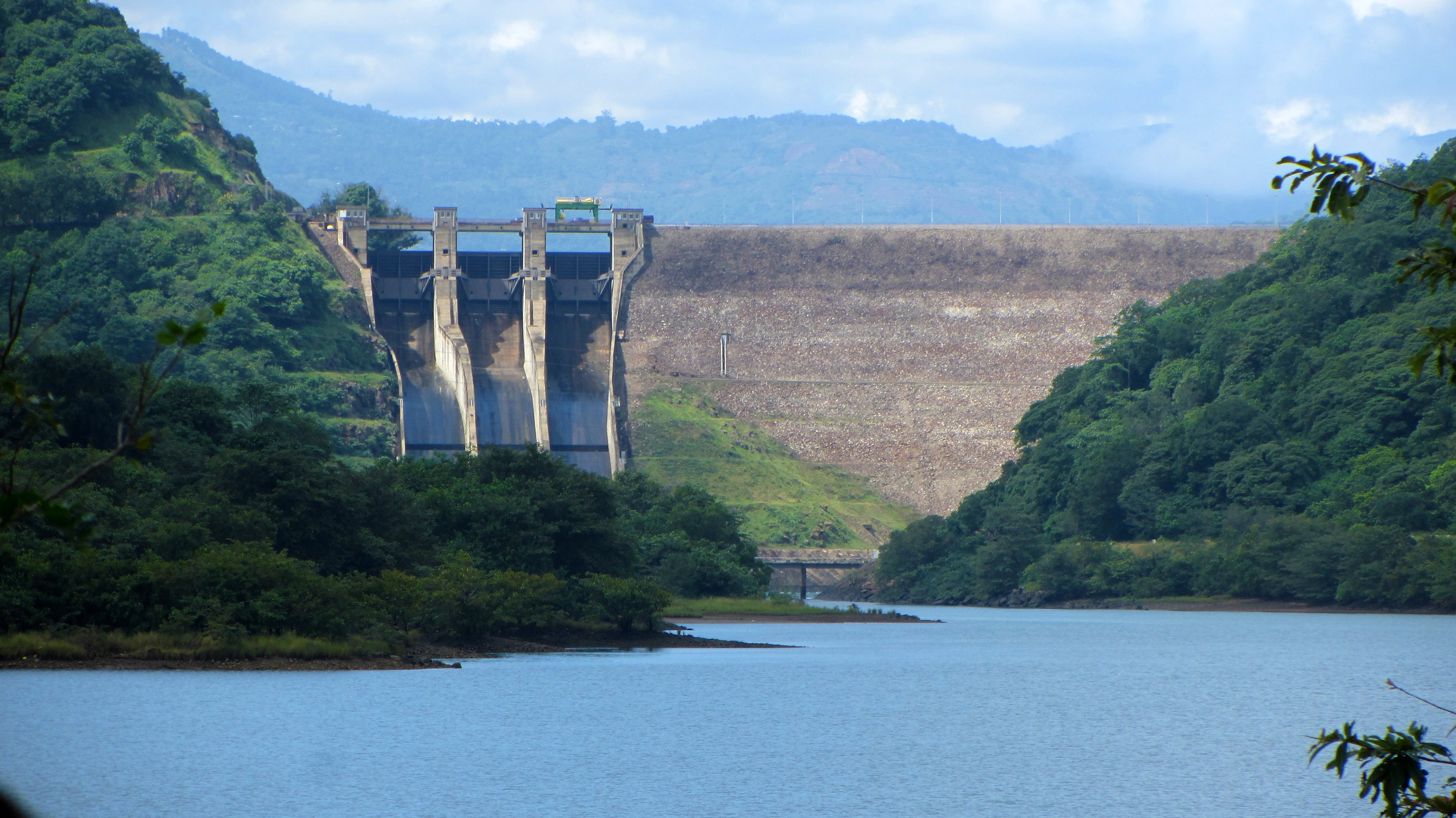
The Randenigala Dam as seen from the Rantembe Reservoir in December 2012. The Rantembe Dam is located just 3 km downstream of Randenigala.

=== Solar power ===
Solar power is a relatively young segment in the energy industry of Sri Lanka. As of 2015, only a few grid-connected solar farms were operational, including a state-run facility. Despite at least half a dozen private companies applying for development permits for photovoltaic and solar thermal projects, most have not actually commenced construction.

Solar farms in Sri Lanka
Solar farm	Location	Capacity (MW)	Owner	Notes	Ref
Diyajanani	07°51′49″N 80°37′31″E	5	WindForce	Floating photovoltaics	
Hambantota	06°13′34″N 81°04′35″E	1.2	Government		
Laugfs	06°13′47″N 81°04′48″E	20.0	LAUGFS Holdings		
Maduru Oya	07°38′53″N 81°12′25″E	100.0	Mixed	Proposed	
Sagasolar	06°13′54″N 81°05′08″E	10.0	Sagasolar Power		
Solar One Ceylon	07°58′30″N 81°14′10″E	12.6	WindForce		
SooryaShakthi - I	Vavunativu, Batticoloa	10	WindForce, HiEnergy, Vidullanka	Commissioned in 2022	
SooryaShakthi - II	Vavunativu, Batticoloa	10	WindForce, HiEnergy, Vidullanka	Commissioned in 2025	

=== Wind power ===
Sri Lanka's wind power sector saw activity as early as 1988, when studies were conducted to build a pilot wind project in the Southern Province. More than a decade later, the state-owned 3 MW Hambantota Wind Farm was commissioned. The industry stayed dormant till 2003, when the National Renewable Energy Laboratory conducted further wind power studies in the island, before which the industry went into dormancy for a further seven years.

Unlike the other industries, Sri Lanka's wind energy industry witnessed a sudden boom in 2010, with the commissioning of the Mampuri Wind Farms, the first private-sector wind project in the country's history. It then suddenly crashed over the following four years after numerous scandals and hidden political dealings surfaced, involving key governing bodies such as the Sustainable Energy Authority and Ceylon Electricity Board, along with a number of senior individuals.

The last privately owned first-come, first-served style wind farm projects, the Pollupalai and Vallimunai Wind Farms, were completed in late 2014, by when the construction of new privately owned wind farms were suspended until further notice by presidential order. The largest private-sector beneficiaries of the "wind power boom" are WindForce and Senok, which currently own seven and three separate wind farms respectively, of the total of 14 privately owned wind farms in operation as at 2015. The other companies in the market include the semi-private LTL Holdings, Aitken Spence, and Willwind, which are currently operating four wind farms in total.

Wind farms in Sri Lanka
Farm	Location	Capacity (MW)	Owner	Operator	Notes	Ref
Ambewela Aitken Spence	06°50′36″N 80°48′47″E	3	Aitken Spence	Ace Wind Power		
Hambantota	06°08′46″N 81°06′47″E	3	CEB	CEB	Decommissioned	
Madurankuliya	08°00′46″N 79°43′37″E	12	WindForce	Daily Life Renewable Energy		
Mampuri-I	08°00′37″N 79°43′24″E	10	Senok	Senok Wind Power		
Mampuri-II	07°58′35″N 79°43′53″E	10.5	Senok	Senok Wind Energy		
Mampuri-III	08°00′35″N 79°43′44″E	10.5	Senok	Senok Wind Resource		
Thambapavani Wind Farm	09°03′01″N 79°47′13″E	103.5	CEB	CEB		
Nala Danavi	08°05′23″N 79°42′33″E	4.8	LTL Holdings	Nala Danavi		
Nirmalapura	07°57′53″N 79°44′07″E	10.5	WindForce	Nirmalapura Wind Power		
Pawan Danavi	08°02′56″N 79°43′08″E	10.2	LTL Holdings	Pawan Danavi		
Pollupalai	09°34′40″N 80°19′12″E	12	WindForce	Joule Power		
Seguwantivu	08°02′48″N 79°48′54″E	9.6	WindForce	Seguwantivu Wind Power		
Uppudaluwa	07°58′52″N 79°46′33″E	10.5	WindForce	PowerGen Lanka		
Vallimunai	09°33′54″N 80°20′12″E	12	WindForce	Beta Power		
Vidatamunai	08°04′00″N 79°47′38″E	10.4	WindForce	Vidatamunai Wind Power		
Willwind	06°36′40″N 80°44′44″E	0.85	Willwind	Willwind		

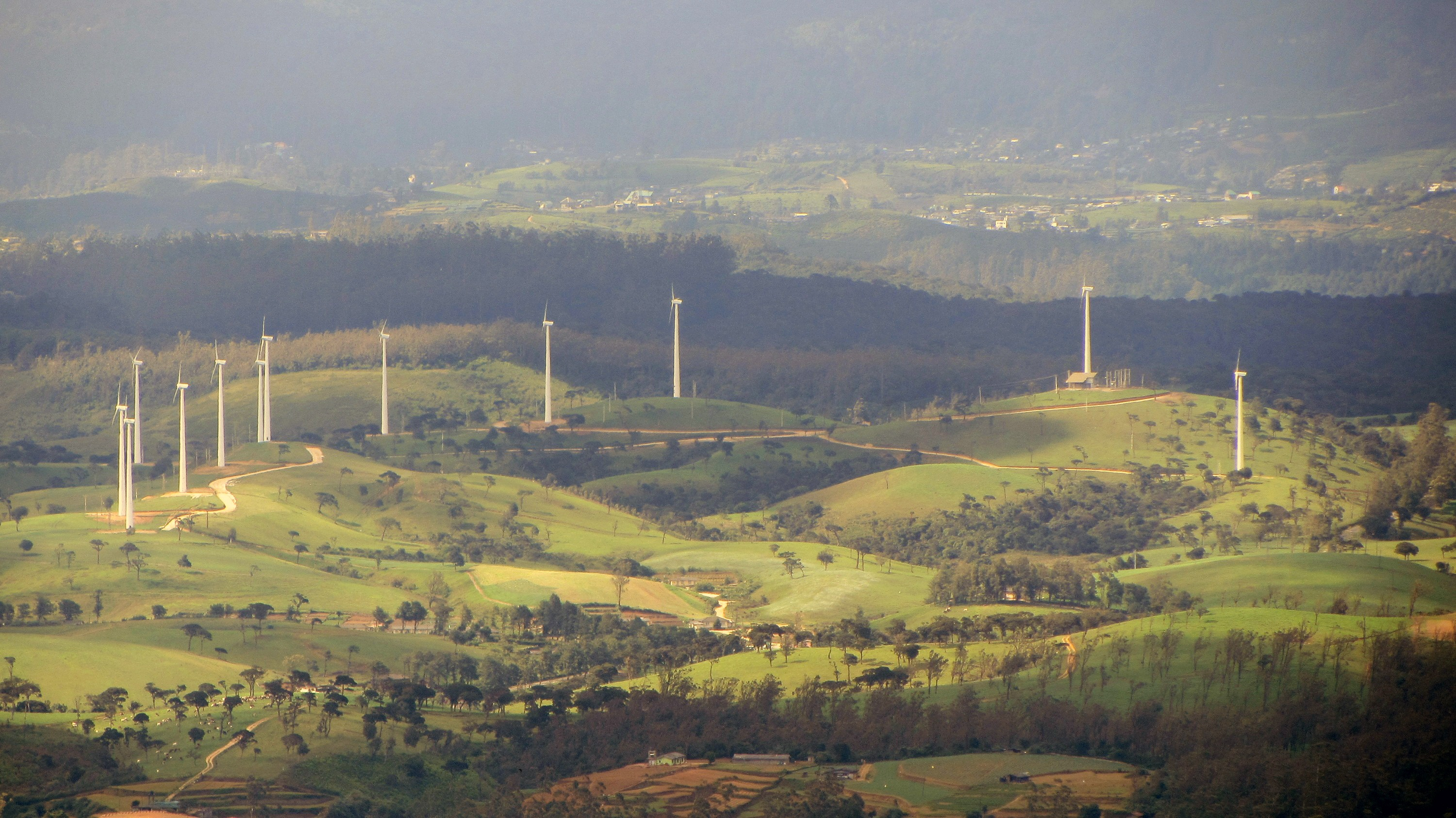
Turbines of the Ambewela Aitken Spence Wind Farm as seen from approximately 10 km away from Horton Plains National Park

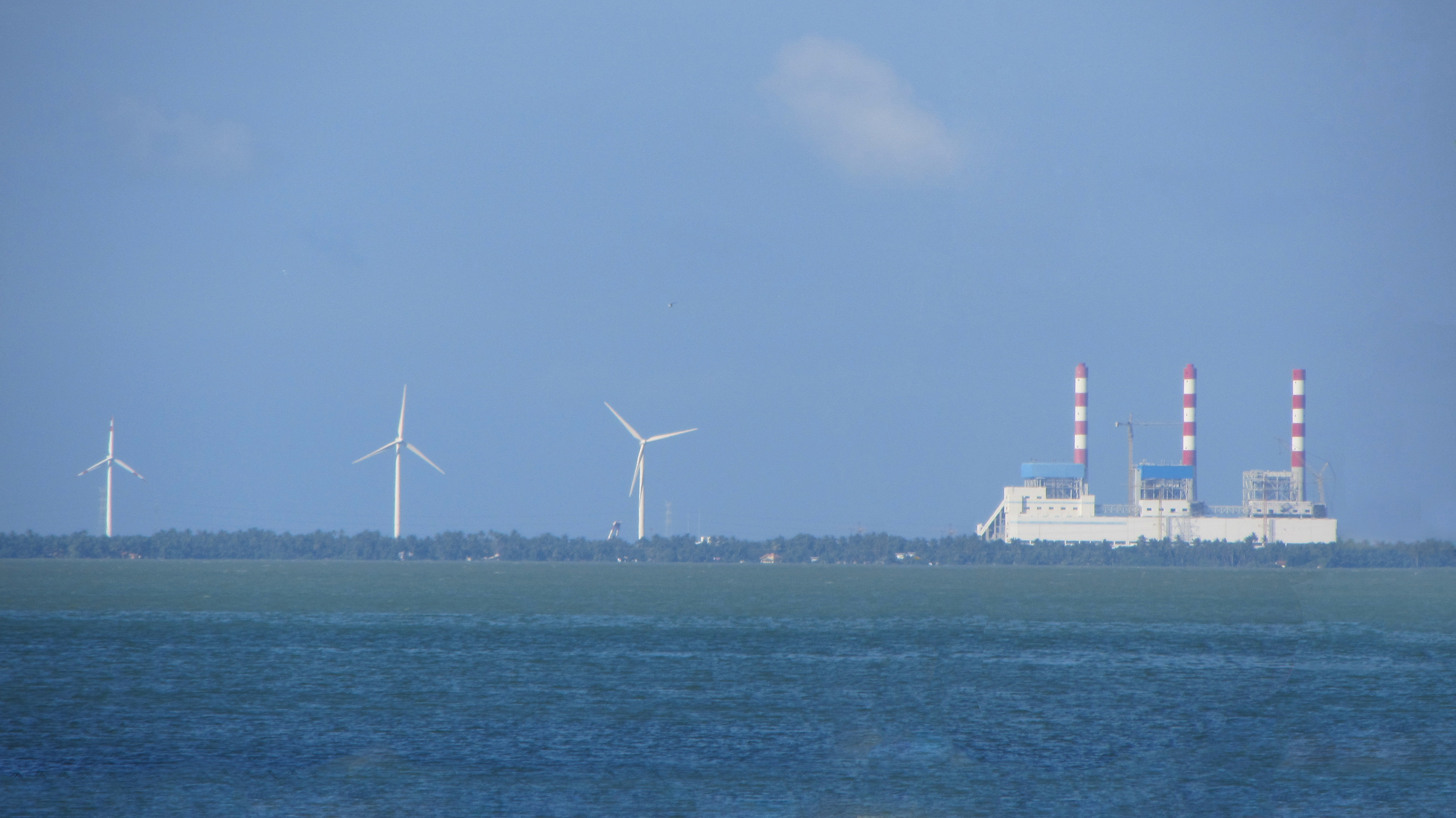
Wind turbines of the Mampuri and Madurankuliya wind farms. The large building on the right is the 900 MW Lakvijaya Power Station.

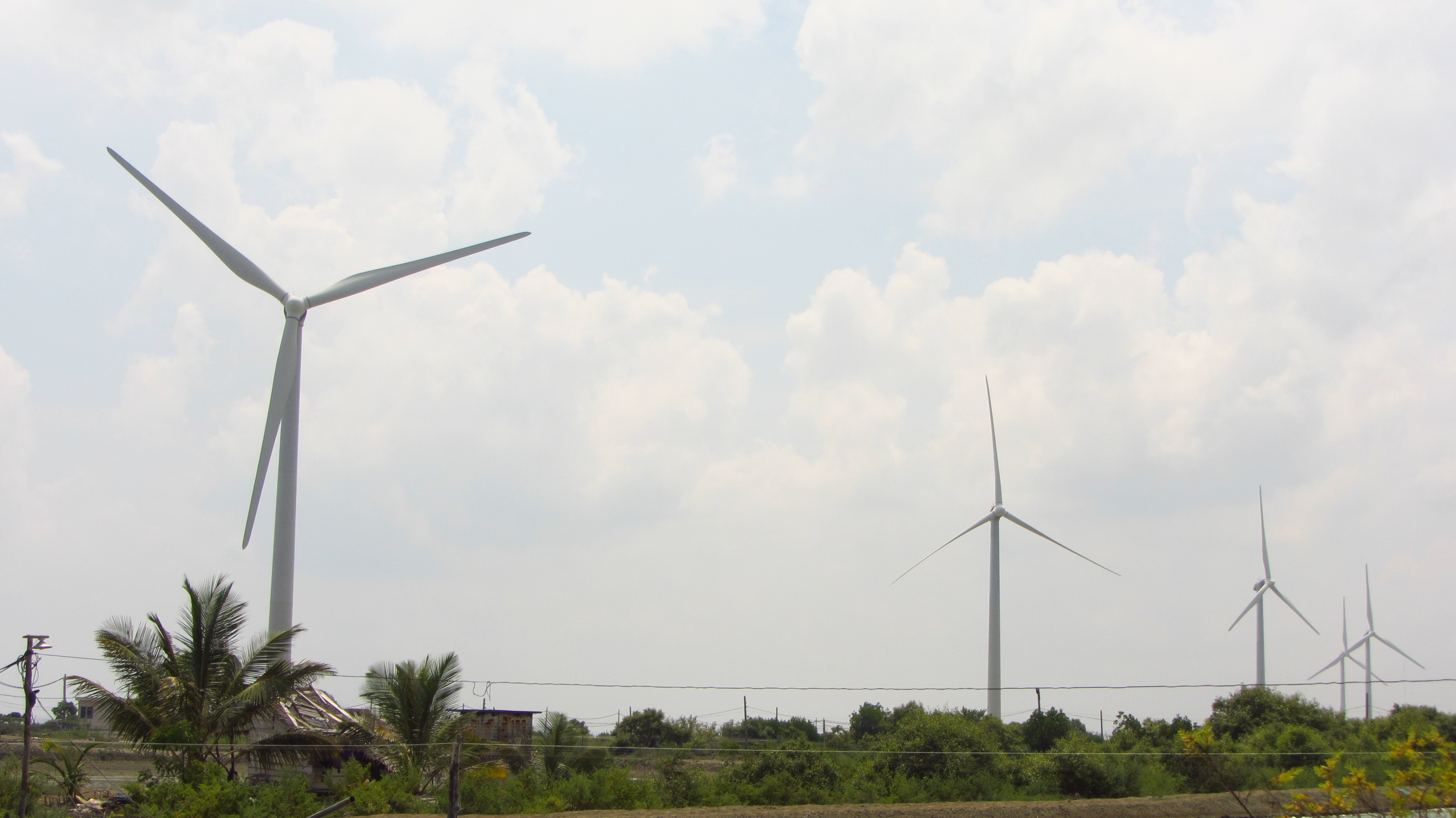
Close-up view of the turbines at Uppudaluwa Wind Farm, in 2014

== See also ==
- Electricity sector in Sri Lanka
- India–Sri Lanka HVDC Interconnection
