= Ace Horana Power Station =

Power station in Horana, Sri Lanka

- Country: Sri Lanka
- Location: Horana
- Coordinates: 6°43′57″N 80°08′17″E
- Status: Decommissioned
- Construction began: 1999
- Commission date: 2002
- Decommission date: 2012
- Construction cost: $11.5 million (2002); 178 million Rs (2002)
- Owner: Ace Power Generation

Thermal power station
- Primary fuel: Fuel oil

Power generation
- Units decommissioned: 4 × 6.3 MW
- Nameplate capacity: 25 MW

The Ace Horana Power Station was a 25-megawatt thermal power station in Horana, Sri Lanka. The plant operated from 2002 to 2012 similar to that of the Ace Matara Power Station, and utilized four 6.3 MW Wärtsilä 18V32LN generating units. The plant was decommissioned in 2012 after its 10-year PPA expired. The power station was originally planned to be built in Anuradhapura, but was later changed to Horana due to environmental and religious protests.

Constructed over a period of 3 years, the plant cost a total of US$ 11.50 million and Rs. 178 million via syndicated loans. Participants in the debt component were HNB (US$ 5.00 m), Commercial Bank (US$ 2.00 m), People's Bank (US$ 1.50 m), Bank of Ceylon (US$ 1.25 m), HSBC (US$ 1.25 m), Pan Asia Bank (US$ 0.50 m), and DFCC Bank (Rs. 178 million). The project was developed by Aitken Spence (51%), CDC Group (29%), Wärtsilä (10%) and Banaras House India (10%).

== See also ==
- Embilipitiya Power Station
- Ace Matara Power Station
- List of power stations in Sri Lanka
