= Rantembe Dam =

Rantembe Dam රංටැබේ වේල්ල
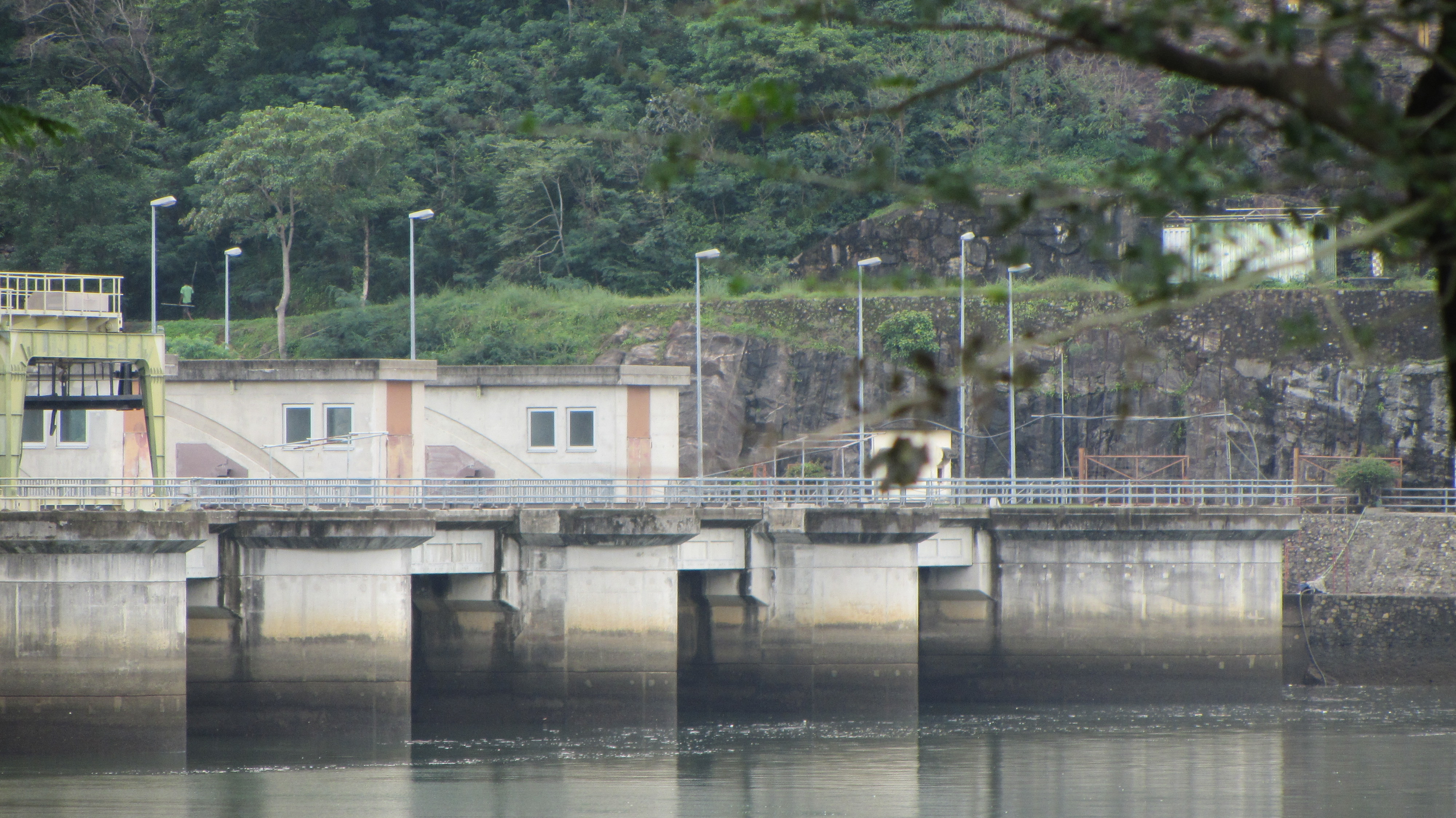
- Upstream view of the Rantembe Dam
- Interactive map of Rantembe Dam රංටැබේ වේල්ල
- Country: Sri Lanka
- Location: Rantembe, Central Province
- Coordinates: 07°12′00″N 80°57′00″E
- Purpose: Power
- Status: Operational
- Construction began: January 1987
- Opening date: May 1990
- Construction cost: Rs. 4.077 billion (1990)
- Owner: Mahaweli Authority

Dam and spillways
- Type of dam: Gravity dam
- Impounds: Mahaweli River
- Height (foundation): 42 m (138 ft)
- Length: 420 m (1,378 ft)
- Spillways: 4
- Spillway type: Tainter gate
- Spillway capacity: 10,235 m^{3}/s (361,446 cu ft/s)

Reservoir
- Creates: Rantembe Reservoir
- Total capacity: 21,000,000 m^{3} (740,000,000 ft^{3})
- Active capacity: 4,400,000 m^{3} (160,000,000 ft^{3})
- Catchment area: 3,118 km^{2} (1,204 mi^{2})

Power Station
- Operator: CEB
- Turbines: 2 × 26 MW
- Installed capacity: 52 MW
- Annual generation: 180 GWh

The Rantembe Dam (Sinhala: රංටැබේ වේල්ල) is a 52-megawatt hydroelectric gravity dam at Rantembe, in the Central Province of Sri Lanka. Construction of the dam began in January 1987, and was completed on schedule in April 1990. The dam was constructed by the German 'Joint Venture Randenigala'; a different German joint venture has built the Randenigala Dam, further upstream.

Construction of the dam cost approximately Rs. 4.077 billion (1990), of which 34.7% (Rs. 1.050 billion) was funded by the Ceylon Electricity Board, with the majority of the remainder funded by Germany.

== Dam, reservoir, and power station ==
The Rantembe Dam, located just 2.8 km (1.7 mi) downstream of the Randenigala Dam, measures 42 m (138 ft) in height, 420 m (1,378 ft) in length, and consists of 4 tainter gate spillways with a combined discharge capacity of 10,235 m^{3}/s (361,446 cu ft/s).

The dam creates the relatively small Rantembe Reservoir, which has a catchment area of 3,118 km^{2} (1,204 mi^{2}), and a total capacity of 21,000,000 m^{3} (740,000,000 ft^{3}).

Water from the reservoir is channelled through the dam through a steel penstock to power the two 26-megawatt turbines. The power station's combined output of 52-megawatts generates 180 GWh annually.

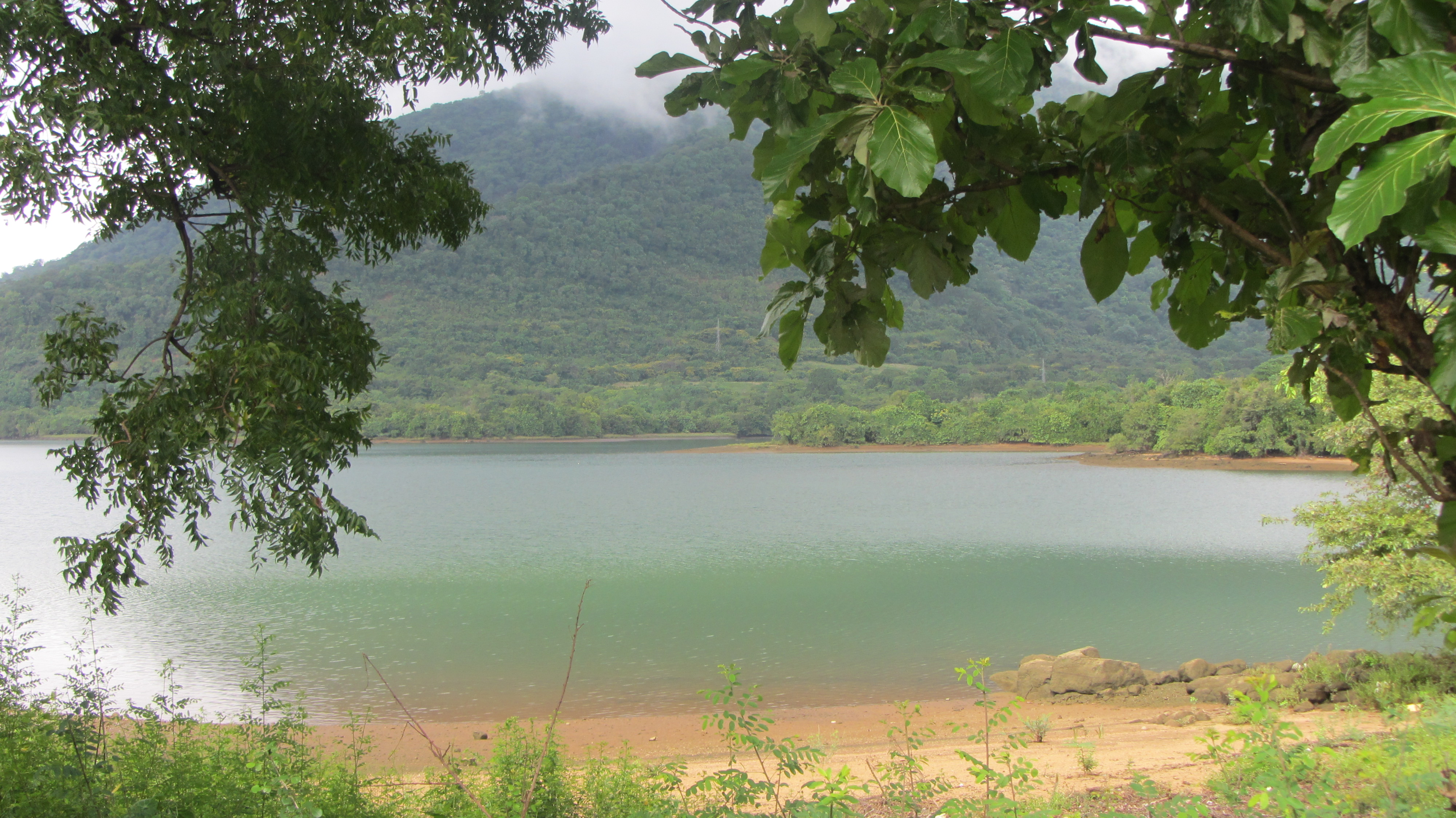
The Rantembe Reservoir.

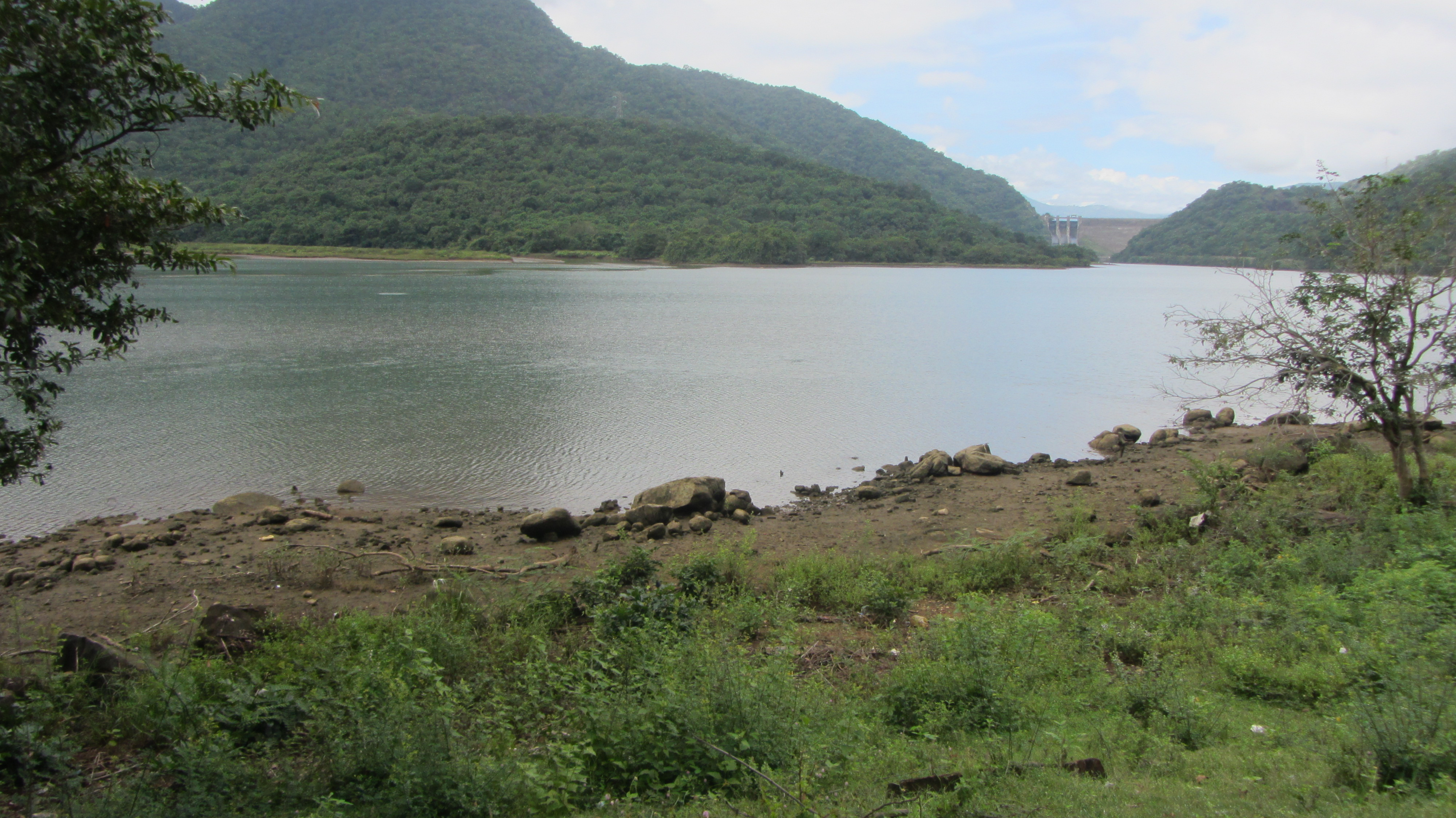
The Rantembe Reservoir, with the Randenigala Dam in the background (upstream).

== See also ==
- List of dams and reservoirs in Sri Lanka
- List of power stations in Sri Lanka
