= Hambantota Wind Farm =

Former wind farm in Hambantota, Sri Lanka

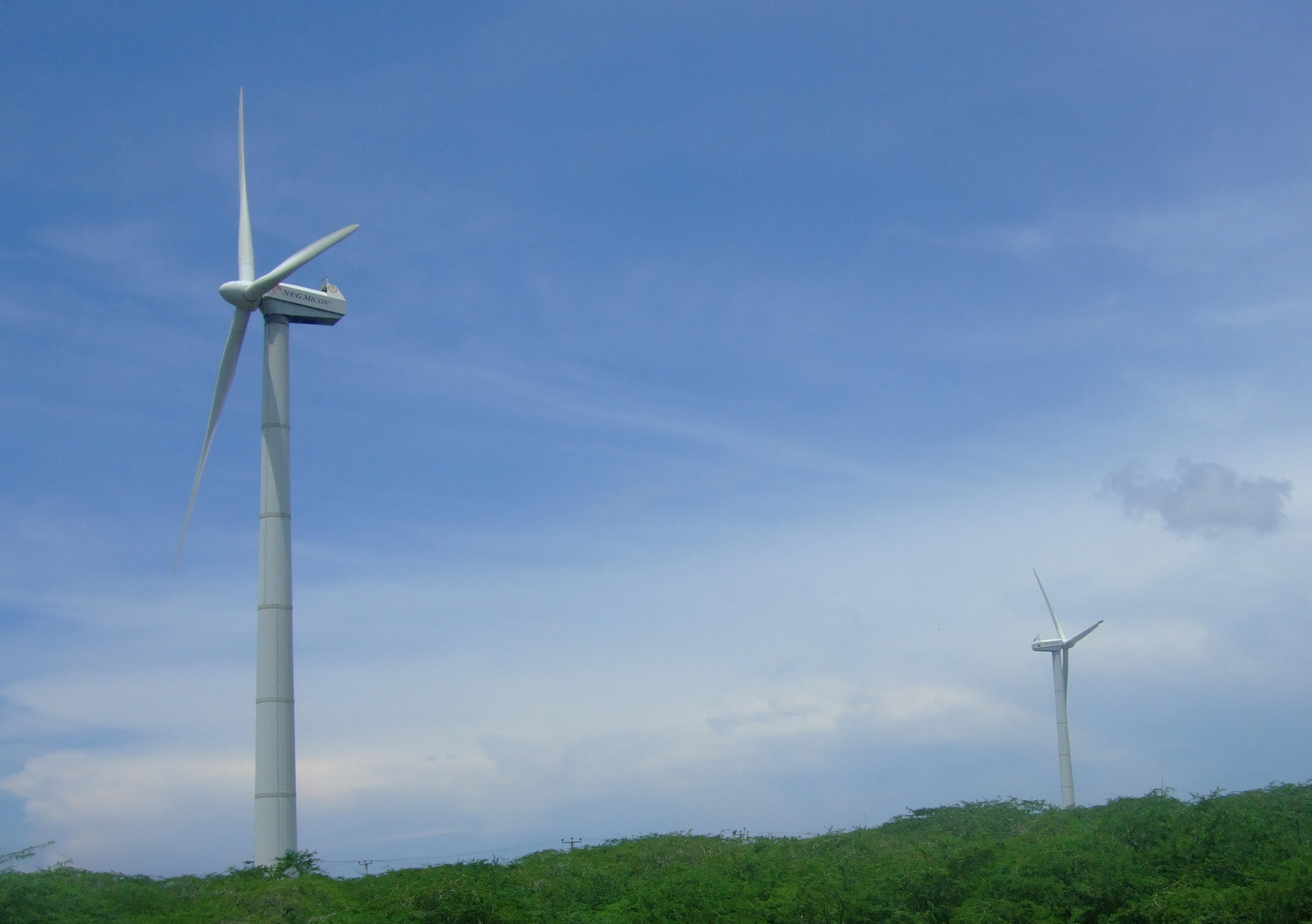
- Two of the five turbines formerly at the wind farm site
- Country: Sri Lanka
- Location: Hambantota
- Coordinates: 6°08′46″N 81°06′47″E
- Status: Decommissioned
- Commission date: March 1999
- Decommission date: October 2018
- Construction cost: 280 million Rs (1999)
- Owner: Government of Sri Lanka
- Operator: CEB

Wind farm
- Type: Onshore
- Rotor diameter: 43 m (141 ft)
- Rated wind speed: 15.5 m/s (51 ft/s)
- Site elevation: 0 m (0 ft)

Power generation
- Units operational: 5 × 0.6 MW
- Make and model: Micon M1500-600 (5)
- Nameplate capacity: 3 MW
- Capacity factor: 14 %
- Annual net output: 4,500 MW h

External links
- Commons: Related media on Commons

The Hambantota Wind Farm was a wind farm in Hambantota, Sri Lanka, owned and operated by the state-run Ceylon Electricity Board. The wind farm, which was located along south-eastern coast of Hambantota was the country's first state owned wind farm, and consisted of five NEG Micon M1500-600 wind turbines of 600 KW each. With a total installed capacity of 3 MW, the wind farm generated up to approximately 4,500 MWh of power a year.

The wind farm cost approximately Rs. 280 million (1999 rates) to build, of which 34% were local funds and 66% were foreign funds. Foreign funds were raised by the Global Environmental Facility and the World Bank. Studies on the project dated as early as 1988, more than a decade before it was commissioned in 1999. The wind farm was decommissioned and dismantled in late 2018.

Specifications of the wind turbines
| Subject | Details |
|---|---|
| Turbine manufacturer | NEG Micon |
| Model | M1500-600 |
| Nameplate capacity | 600 KW |
| Cut-in wind speed | 3.5 m/s (11 ft/s) |
| Rated wind speed | 15.5 m/s (51 ft/s) |
| Cut-out wind speed | 25 m/s (82 ft/s) |
| Survival wind speed | 69 m/s (226 ft/s) |
| Hub height | 46 m (151 ft) |
| Rotor diameter | 43 m (141 ft) |
| Rotor swept-area | 1,452 m^{2} (15,629 ft^{2}) |
| Rotor RPM | 18 to 27 |
| Weight of rotor | 13,000 kg (29,000 lb) |
| Weight of nacelle | 19,000 kg (42,000 lb) |
| Tower type | Tubular steel (seven sections) |
| Weight of tower | 40,000 kg (88,000 lb) |
| Diameter of tower foundation | 11 m (36 ft) |

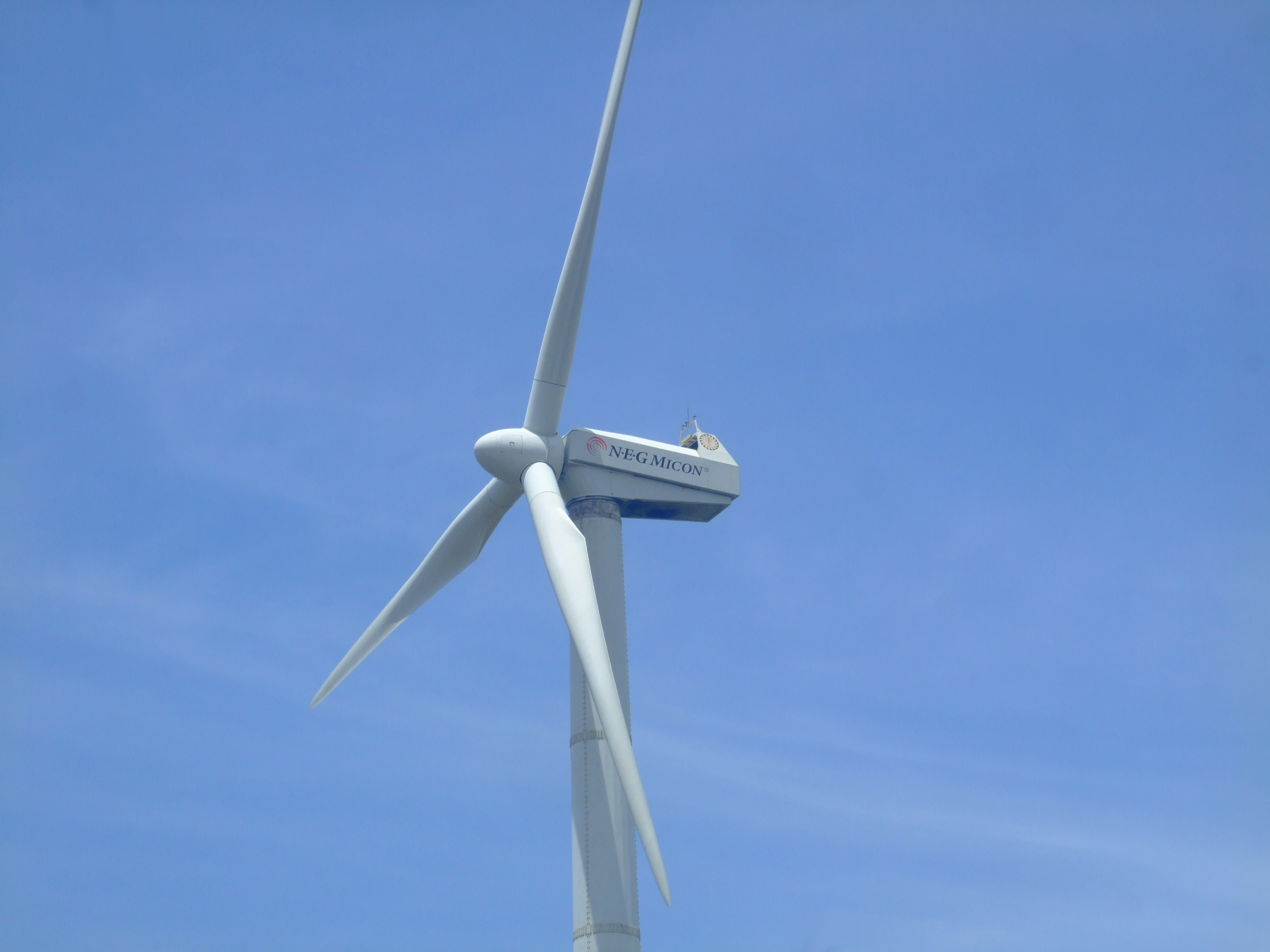
Close-up of a turbine hub.

== See also ==
- List of power stations in Sri Lanka
