= Ace Matara Power Station =

Power station in Mantara, Sri Lanka

- Country: Sri Lanka
- Coordinates: 5°59′07″N 80°33′49″E
- Status: Operational
- Commission date: 2002
- Owner: Aust-Asia Energy
- Operator: Ace Power Generation Matara
- Employees: 30 (2019)

Thermal power station
- Primary fuel: Fuel oil

Power generation
- Units operational: 4 × 6.3 MW
- Make and model: Wärtsilä 18V32LN (4)
- Nameplate capacity: 25 MW
- Annual net output: 167.3 GWh

The Ace Matara Power Station is a 25-megawatt power station located in Matara, Sri Lanka. During its operations from 2002 to 2012, the plant utilized four 6.3 MW Wärtsilä 18V32LN generating units. The plant was decommissioned in 2012 after its 10-year PPA expired and recommissioned in 2017.

== See also ==
- Embilipitiya Power Station
- Ace Horana Power Station
- List of power stations in Sri Lanka
