= Aggreko Power Station =

Former oil-fired power station in Chunnakam, Sri Lanka

- Country: Sri Lanka
- Location: Chunnakam
- Coordinates: 9°44′25″N 80°02′06″E
- Status: Decommissioned
- Commission date: October 2003
- Decommission date: 31 December 2012
- Operator: Aggreko

Thermal power station
- Primary fuel: Fuel oil
- Feed-in tariff: 26 Sri Lankan rupee (per kilowatt-hour)

Power generation
- Nameplate capacity: 20 MW

The Aggreko Power Station (2003–2012) was a temporary 20-megawatt fuel oil-fired power station in Sri Lanka. It was commissioned in October 2003 after power generation company Aggreko won an open bid offered by the Ceylon Electricity Board to overcome the Sri Lanka energy crisis faced in the 1990s to early 2000s. It was decommissioned on 31 December 2012. Prior to decommissioning, Aggreko sold electricity to the Ceylon Electricity Board at a rate of Rs. 26 per KWh.

== See also ==
- List of power stations in Sri Lanka
