= Aitken Spence Power Station =

Waste-to-energy power station in Muthurajawela, Sri Lanka

- Country: Sri Lanka
- Coordinates: 07°00′56″N 79°52′14″E
- Status: Under construction
- Construction began: 10 August 2017
- Construction cost: 9,000 million Rs (2018)
- Owner: Aitken Spence
- Operator: Western Power Company

Thermal power station
- Primary fuel: Municipal solid waste
- Feed-in tariff: 36.2 Sri Lankan rupee (per kilowatt-hour)
- PUCSL license: EL/GS/13-03

Power generation
- Nameplate capacity: 10 MW
- Annual net output: 86.25 GWh

The Aitken Spence Power Station (formerly referred to as the Meethotamulla Power Station) is a municipal solid waste-fired thermal power station in Kerawalapitiya, Sri Lanka. It was originally planned to be built at Meethotamulla, the site of a large solid waste landfill which was under international media spotlight after the 2017 Meethotamulla garbage landslide which killed over 30 people. The power station will operate approximately 7500 hours a year, utilizing the 700 metric tons (1,500,000 lb) of fresh waste from the Colombo Municipal Council area, daily. The power station in being built together with the KCHT Power Station.

The facility generates 11.5 megawatt (MW) of power, of which 9.7 MW will be sold to the state-owned Ceylon Electricity Board, at a rate of Rs. 37.10 per KWh generated. Construction of the US$98 million power station began on 10 August 2017, and started operations in 2021. It is operated by Western Power Company Limited, a subsidiary of Aitken Spence. The power station's PUCSL energy license is EL/GS/13-03.

== See also ==
- List of power stations in Sri Lanka
- Muthurajawela wetlands
