= Hambantota Solar Power Station =

Solar power station in Hambantota, Sri Lanka

- Country: Sri Lanka
- Location: Hambantota
- Coordinates: 6°13′34″N 81°04′35″E
- Status: Operational
- Commission date: August 2012
- Construction cost: 1,829 million Rs (2012)
- Owner: Sri Lanka Sustainable Energy Authority

Solar farm
- Type: Standard PV
- Site area: 40,000 m^{2} (430,000 sq ft)

Power generation
- Nameplate capacity: 1,237 kW
- Annual net output: 1,700 MW h

The Hambantota Solar Power Station (also known as the Buruthakanda Solar Park) is the first commercial-scale solar power station in Sri Lanka. The photovoltaic solar facility was constructed in Buruthakanda, in the Hambantota District. The plant is owned and operated by the Sri Lanka Sustainable Energy Authority, a state-run organization responsible for renewable resources.

The facility was built in two stages, with the first stage of 737 kilowatt (kW), and the second stage of 500 kW in installed capacities. The construction cost of the first 737 kW phase is expected to top up to Rs. 1,202.4 million, of which the funds will be provided by the Japanese Government. While the second stage would top a cost of Rs. 627 million, of which Rs. 513 million would be provided by the Korean Government, and Rs. 114 million would be borne by the local government. Subcontractor of the second phase is Sunpower Systems (Pvt)Ltd.

Upon completion in late 2012, the entire 1,237 kW facility was expected to produce up to 1.7 gigawatt-hour (GWh) of energy annually, 1 GWh from the first stage, and 0.7 GWh from the second stage. The generated power would be sold to the state-run power company Ceylon Electricity Board, while the revenue would be used to promote rural electrification projects.

== See also ==
- Energy in Sri Lanka
- List of power stations in Sri Lanka
