= Nilambe Dam =

- Location within Sri Lanka
- Country: Sri Lanka
- Location: Nilambe, Central Province
- Coordinates: 07°11′18″N 80°37′52″E
- Purpose: Power
- Status: Operational
- Operator: Mahaweli Authority

Dam and spillways
- Type of dam: Gravity dam
- Impounds: Nilambe River
- Length: 70 m (230 ft)

Reservoir
- Creates: Nilambe Reservoir
- Maximum length: 250 m (820 ft)
- Maximum width: 240 m (790 ft)

Nilambe Power Station
- Coordinates: 07°11′48″N 80°36′44″E
- Operator: CEB
- Commission date: July 1988
- Type: Conventional
- Turbines: 2 × 1.6 MW
- Installed capacity: 3.2 MW

The Nilambe Dam is a small hydroelectric dam build across the Nilambe River, measuring approximately 70 m (230 ft) in length. Water from the Nilambe Dam is transferred to the 3.2-megawatt Nilambe Power Station through a 2.8 km (1.7 mi) penstock. The power station consists of two 1.6 MW generating units, which were commissioned in July 1988.

== See also ==
- List of dams and reservoirs in Sri Lanka
- List of power stations in Sri Lanka
