= Sobadhanavi Power Station =

Power station in Sri Lanka

- Country: Sri Lanka
- Location: Kerawalapitiya
- Coordinates: 7°00′46″N 79°52′35″E
- Status: Operational
- Commission date: 24 August 2024
- Owner: Sobadanavi Limited
- Operator: Lakdhanavi Limited

Thermal power station
- Primary fuel: Liquefied natural gas
- Turbine technology: Gas turbine
- Combined cycle?: Yes

Power generation
- Units operational: 1 × 130 MW; 1 × 220 MW
- Make and model: Unknown (2)
- Nameplate capacity: 350 MW

External links
- Website: www.lakdhanavi.lk/project/sobadhanavi-limited/

Sobadhanavi Power Station is a 350MW LNG-fired combined cycle power station located in Kerawalapitiya, Sri Lanka. The first phase of 220MW was commissioned on 28 August 2024, consisting of a single F-class gas turbine manufactured by Siemens Energy. The second phase consisting of a 130MW steam turbine (using heat from the 220MW gas turbine), was commissioned on 17 September 2025.

== See also ==
- List of power stations in Sri Lanka
