= Lanka Electricity Company =

Sri Lankan electric power company

Lanka Electricity Company (Private) Limited (LECO)
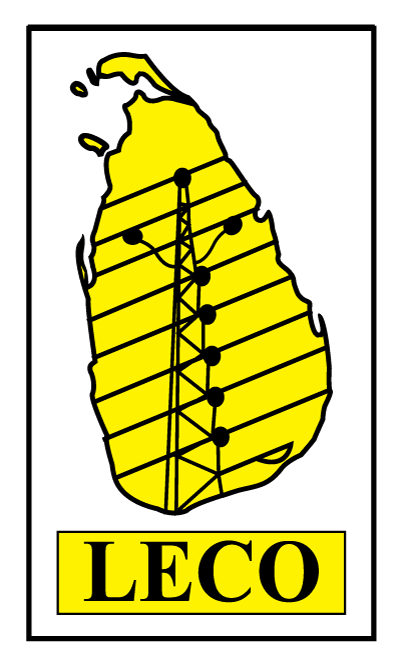
- Native name: ලංකා විදුලි (පුද්ගලික) සමාගම இலங்கை மின்சார (தனியார்) கம்பனி
- Company type: Subsidiary
- Industry: Electricity generation, Electricity transmission, Electricity distribution, Electricity retailing
- Fate: Merged
- Key people: Athula Priyadharshana De Silva (chairman)
- Revenue: ▲ Rs. 30.573 billion (2017)
- Operating income: ▼ Rs. 737 million (2017)
- Net income: ▲ Rs. 125 million (2017)
- Total assets: ▲ Rs. 41.1 billion (2017)
- Total equity: ▲ Rs. 29.5 billion (2017)
- Number of employees: 1,573 (2017)
- Parent: Ceylon Electricity Board
- Website: www.leco.lk

The Lanka Electricity Company (Private) Limited (Sinhala: ලංකා විදුලි (පුද්ගලික) සමාගම Lanka viduli pudgalika samagama) (also abbreviated as LECO), was one of two on-grid electricity companies in Sri Lanka; the other was the Ceylon Electricity Board (CEB). Established as a private limited liability company registered under the Companies Act No. 17 of 1982, It was merged with the newly formed Electricity Distribution Lanka, as per the provisions in the amendment to the Sri Lanka Electricity Act of 2025 its shareholders are the Ceylon Electricity Board, the Urban Development Authority (UDA), the Treasury and four local government authorities. It is regulated by the Public Utilities Commission of Sri Lanka. As of 2019, LECO sold 1,629.39 kilowatt-hours (5,865.8 MJ) of power to 588,879 consumers, and made revenues of රු.32,576,500,000.

== History ==
LECO was established in 1983. President J. R. Jayewardene selected Engineer H.S. Subasinghe to lead the fledgling company.

The electricity distribution networks, managed by local government authorities, had suffered from years of neglect and insufficient investments. The consequences were evident — frequent breakdowns, overloaded grids, and arduous processes for securing electricity connections for new residences.

LECO took a multi-faceted approach to deal with these challenges. Old electricity lines were dismantled and new lines were designed, utilising insulated wires for safety and reliability. An innovative transition to concrete utility poles ensured that no external support structures were needed. This move not only expedited the installation process but also effectively optimised space utilisation, a critical consideration in the densely populated areas LECO operated in.

Location of LECO branches

== Branches ==
LECO has 7 geographical branches:

- Kotte
- Nugegoda
- Moratuwa
- Kalutara
- Kelaniya
- Negombo
- Galle

== Microgrid ==
LECO partnered with the University of Moratuwa to begin a microgrid pilot project in Sri Lanka with financial assistance from the Asian Development Bank. The aim of the project is to contribute to Sri Lanka's stated target of 70% of power generation through renewable sources by 2030. 32,411 rooftop solar units have already been installed in the country as of April 2021, with a total capacity of 367 MW.

== Ante LECO Metering Company ==
Established in 2017 as a joint venture with Ante Meter Company Ltd. of China, Ante LECO Metering Company is a LECO subsidiary that specializes in building household electric meters. Located in Bandaragama, the factory produces 2000 smart meters daily.
