= Madurankuliya Wind Farm =

Wind farm in Sri Lanka

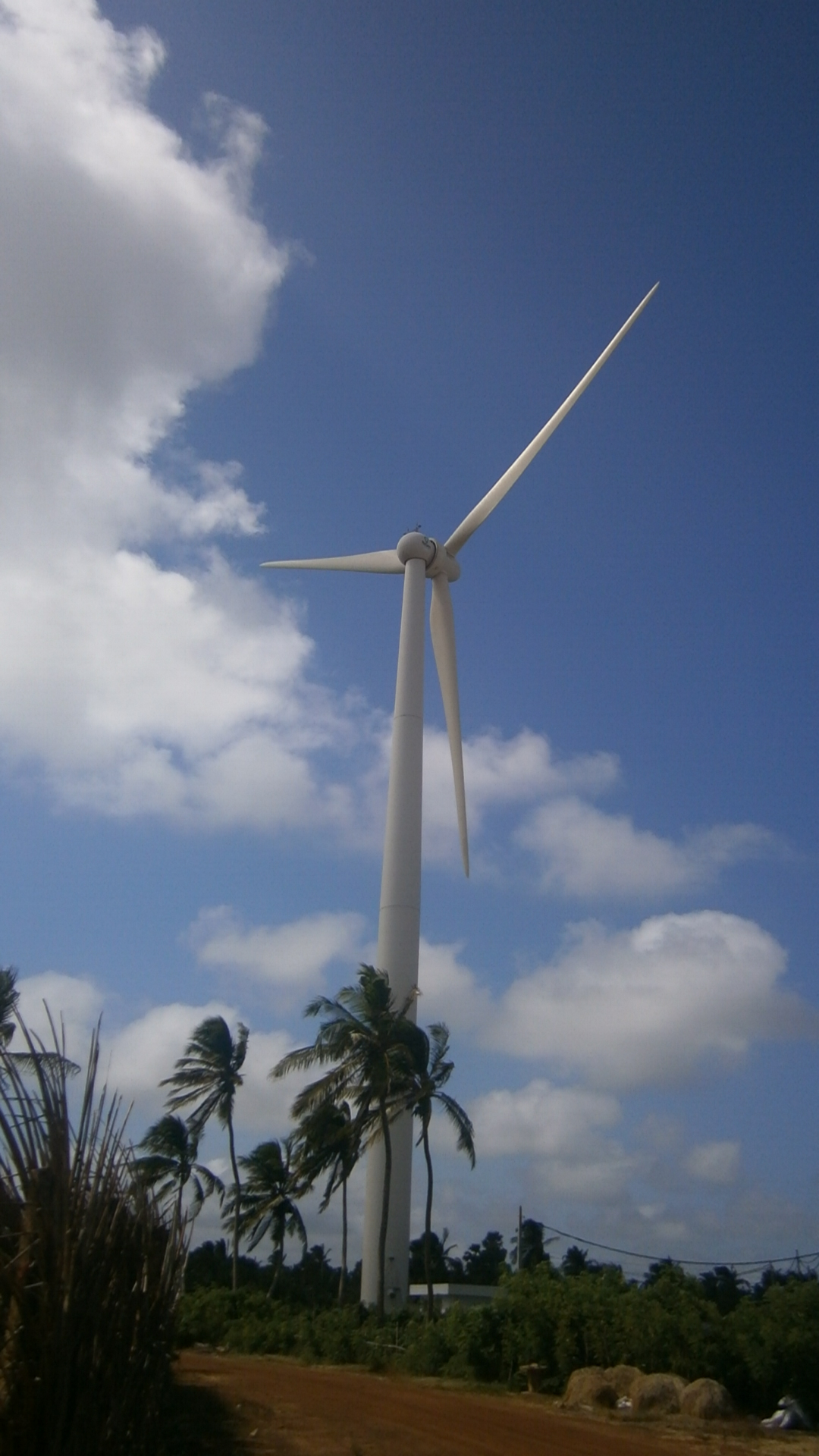
- Country: Sri Lanka
- Location: Puttalam
- Coordinates: 8°01′N 79°44′E
- Status: Operational
- Commission date: March 2012
- Owner: Akbar Brothers
- Operator: Daily Life Renewable Energy

Wind farm
- Type: Onshore
- Rotor diameter: 82 m (269 ft)
- Rated wind speed: 12.5 m/s (41 ft/s)

Power generation
- Units operational: 8 × 1.5 MW
- Make and model: ReGen Vensys 82 (8)
- Nameplate capacity: 12 MW

External links
- Commons: Related media on Commons

The Madurankuliya Wind Farm (also known as Narakkaliya Wind Farm, after its location) is a 12 MW wind farm located in Narakkaliya, bordering the Lakvijaya Power Station, in Narakkaliya, Puttalam, Sri Lanka. The wind farm is operated by Daily Life Renewable Energy (Pvt) Ltd, a subsidiary of WindForce (Pvt) Ltd, which owns most of the existing wind farms in the country. The facility consists of eight ReGen VENSYS 82 wind turbines of 1.5 MW each. With a hub height of 85 m (279 ft) and a rotor diameter of 82 m (269 ft), these turbines has rated wind speeds of 13 m/s (43 ft/s), despite the site only experiencing about 7.4 m/s (24 ft/s). The wind farm experiences air densities of 1.158 kg/m^{3} (0.072 lb/cu ft).

Turbine locations
Turbine	Coordinates
Turbine 1	08°00′46″N 79°43′37″E
Turbine 2	08°00′51″N 79°43′35″E
Turbine 3	08°01′24″N 79°43′26″E
Turbine 4	08°01′31″N 79°43′22″E
Turbine 5	08°01′39″N 79°43′20″E
Turbine 6	08°01′47″N 79°43′17″E
Turbine 7	08°01′53″N 79°43′17″E
Turbine 8	08°01′47″N 79°43′06″E

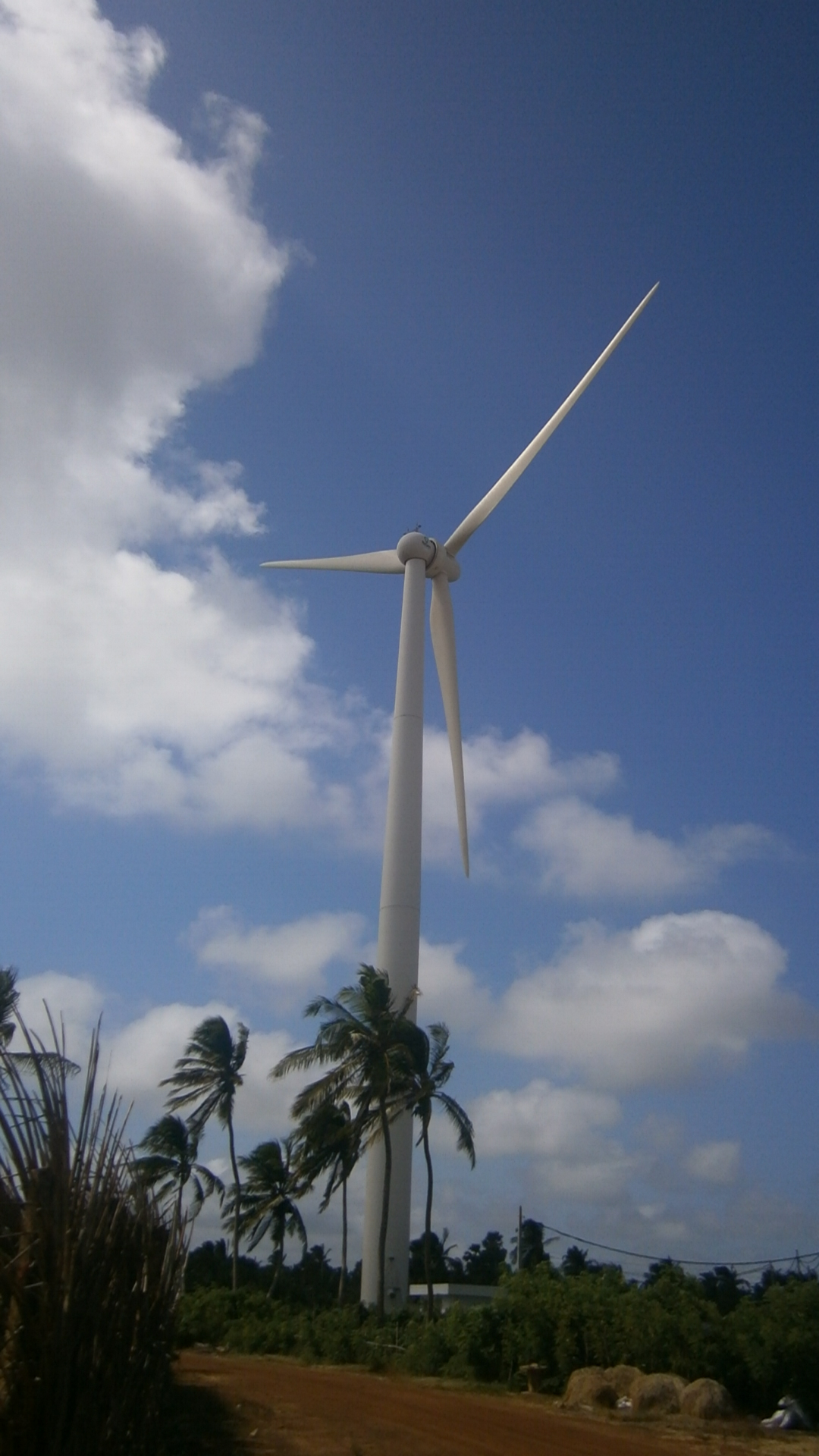
A turbine at the wind farm site, in July 2013.

== See also ==
- Electricity in Sri Lanka
- List of power stations in Sri Lanka
