= Bithugalgama =

Bithugalgama බිතුගල්ගම
- Village
- Location within Sri Lanka
- Coordinates: 6.6239°N 80.7448°E
- Country: Sri Lanka
- Province: Sabaragamuwa Province
- District: Balangoda
- Time zone: UTC+5:30 (Sri Lanka Standard Time)
- Sri Lanka Post: 70100
- Area code: 045

Bithugalgama is a village in the Ratnapura District of Sabaragamuwa Province, Sri Lanka. The village is close to the Willpita Wind Farm.
