= India–Sri Lanka HVDC Interconnection =

Location
- Services: Power Transmission, Black Start, STATCOM operation, HVDC Islanded operation, Grid Isolation
- Country: India, Sri Lanka
- State: Tamil Nadu, India
- Province: Northern Province, Sri Lanka
- Coordinates: 09°07′00″N 79°29′00″E
- General direction: East - West
- From: Madurai, India
- Passes through: Palk Strait
- To: Mannar, Sri Lanka
- Runs alongside: Gulf of Mannar Marine National Park, Gulf of Mannar, Adam's Bridge Marine National Park, Adams Bridge, Vaigai River

Ownership information
- Owner: India & Sri Lanka
- Partners: PGCIL, CEB
- Operator: India & Sri Lanka

Construction information
- Cable manufacturer: TBA
- Cable installer: TBA
- Cable layer: Under Planning
- Substation manufacturer: TBA
- Substation installer: TBA
- Contractors: TBA
- Construction started: TBA
- Expected: 2030
- Construction cost: 340 to 430 Million dollars
- Commissioned: NIL

Technical information
- Type: Subsea cable with Back to Back VSC HVDC Scheme
- Current type: HVDC
- Total length: 250 km (160 mi)
- Capacity: 1,000 MW
- AC voltage: Under Planning
- DC voltage: Under Planning
- No. of poles: Bipole

The India – Sri Lanka HVDC Grid Interconnection is a proposed project to link the national grids of India and Sri Lanka. The project involves the construction of a high-voltage direct current (HVDC) connection between Madurai in southern India, and Mannar in Northern Sri Lanka, through the Palk Strait. The link would measure on approximate 250 kilometres (160 mi) in length, including 120 kilometres (75 mi) of submarine cables, and would take more than three years to construct. Earlier it was planned till Anuradhapura in Sri Lanka but short terminated at Mannar (earlier as subsea cable landing station) due to escalating project costs. It would be implemented by the Power Grid Corporation of India Limited and Ceylon Electricity Board.

India's grid is connected to Bangladesh, Bhutan, and Nepal. This project will link Sri Lanka with the rest of the South Asian grid.

Having been contemplated since 1970, the project has four implementation alternatives in consideration:

- Madurai–Anuradhapura
- Thoothukudi–Puttalam (aligning with the existing operational Bharat Lanka Cable System route)
- Madurai–Puttalam
- Madurai–Anuradhapura (with back-to-back HVDC)
- Madurai - Mannar VSC HVDC bipole considered as the latest update as of 2026.

The connection will be developed in two phases, of which the first phase, scheduled to complete in the near-future, would enable the transmission of 500 MW between the two countries. The second phase would enable a 1,000 MW transmission capacity, the target capacity. VSC HVDC technology is selected in consideration to the srilanka's week grid network which has been exposed during 2025 Srilankan Blackouts which helps providing black start capabilities for the island nation.

It is expected to reach a total development cost of approximately US$800,000,000. Such a connection between the two countries would enable the nations to sell excess energy, thus saving valuable resources.

In February 2016, Damitha Kumarasinghe, Director general of Public Utilities Commission of Sri Lanka, announced that pre-feasibility studies on the project had been completed.

Additionally, the National Renewable Energy Laboratory in collaboration with Ceylon Electricity Board completed an operational analysis of the HVDC connection for one year of operations.

But due to the ongoing 2019 economic crisis in Sri Lanka, the already planned 55 km under sea cable HVDC link is redesigned to be constructed as a over sea cable HVDC link, and the project is planned to be completed within 2030 from Madurai to Anuradhapura with the help of the World Bank.

== See also ==
- High-voltage direct current
- List of HVDC projects
- List of power stations in Sri Lanka
