= Uppudaluwa Wind Farm =

Wind farm in Sri Lanka

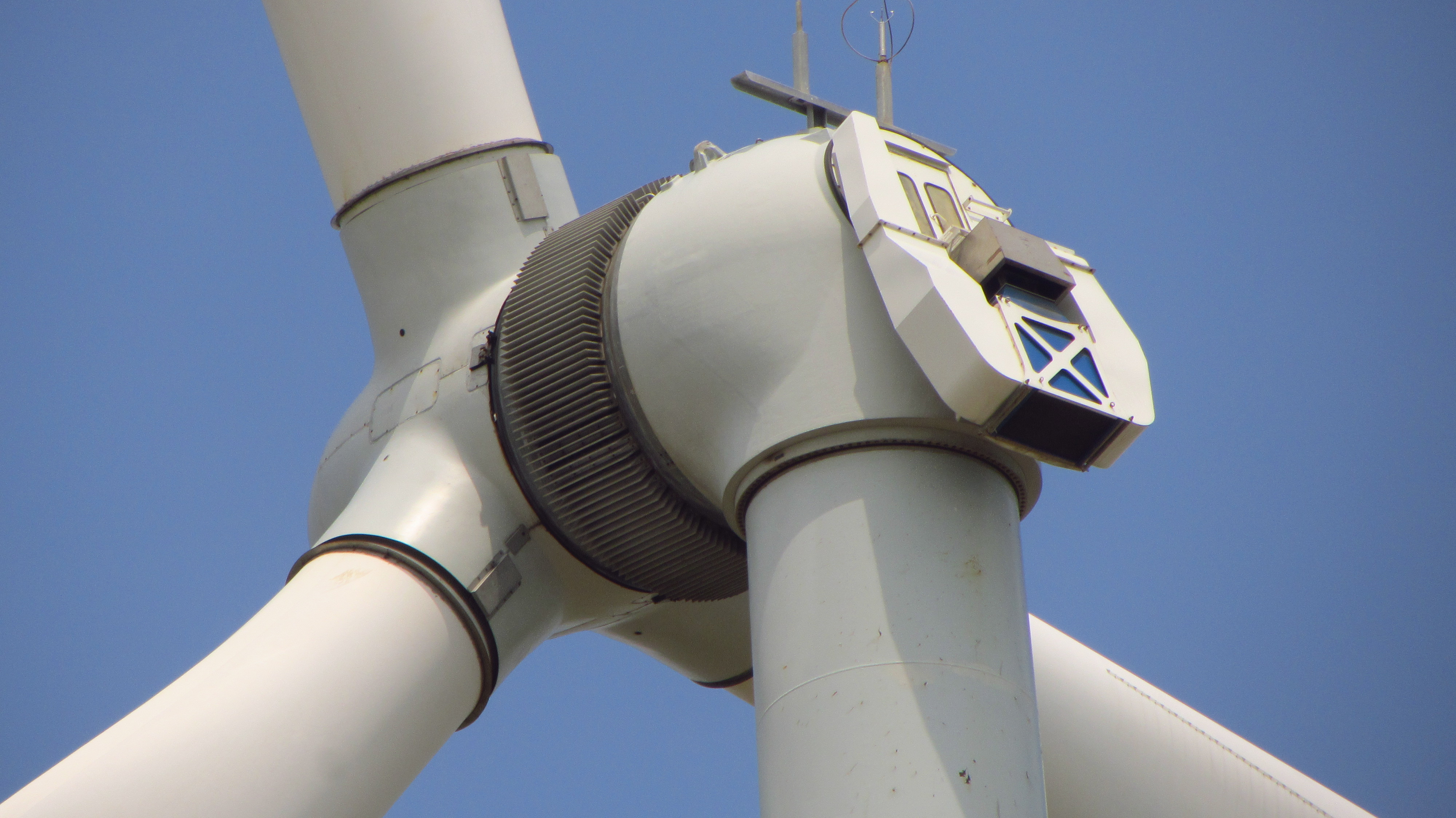
- The nacelle of a Leitner Shriram LTW-77-1.5 wind turbine.
- Country: Sri Lanka
- Location: Uppudaluwa
- Coordinates: 07°58′52″N 79°46′33″E
- Status: Operational
- Construction began: September 2010
- Commission date: June 2011
- Construction cost: US$18.55 million
- Owner: WindForce (Pvt) Ltd
- Operator: PowerGen Lanka (Pvt) Ltd

Power generation
- Units operational: 7 × 1.5 MW
- Make and model: Leitner Shriram: LTW 77-1.5
- Nameplate capacity: 10.5 MW
- Annual net output: 26.28 GWh

External links
- Commons: Related media on Commons

The Uppudaluwa Wind Farm (also known as PowerGen Lanka Wind Farm, after its developers) is a 10.5 MW wind farm owned by PowerGen Lanka (Private) Limited in Uppudaluwa, Puttalam, Sri Lanka.

The project agreement was signed with the Board of Investment in August 2010, with construction of the wind farm commencing in the following month. The project was commissioned in June 2011, with a total cost of US$18.55 million. The plant is estimated to generate 26.28 GWh annually.

== Wind turbines ==
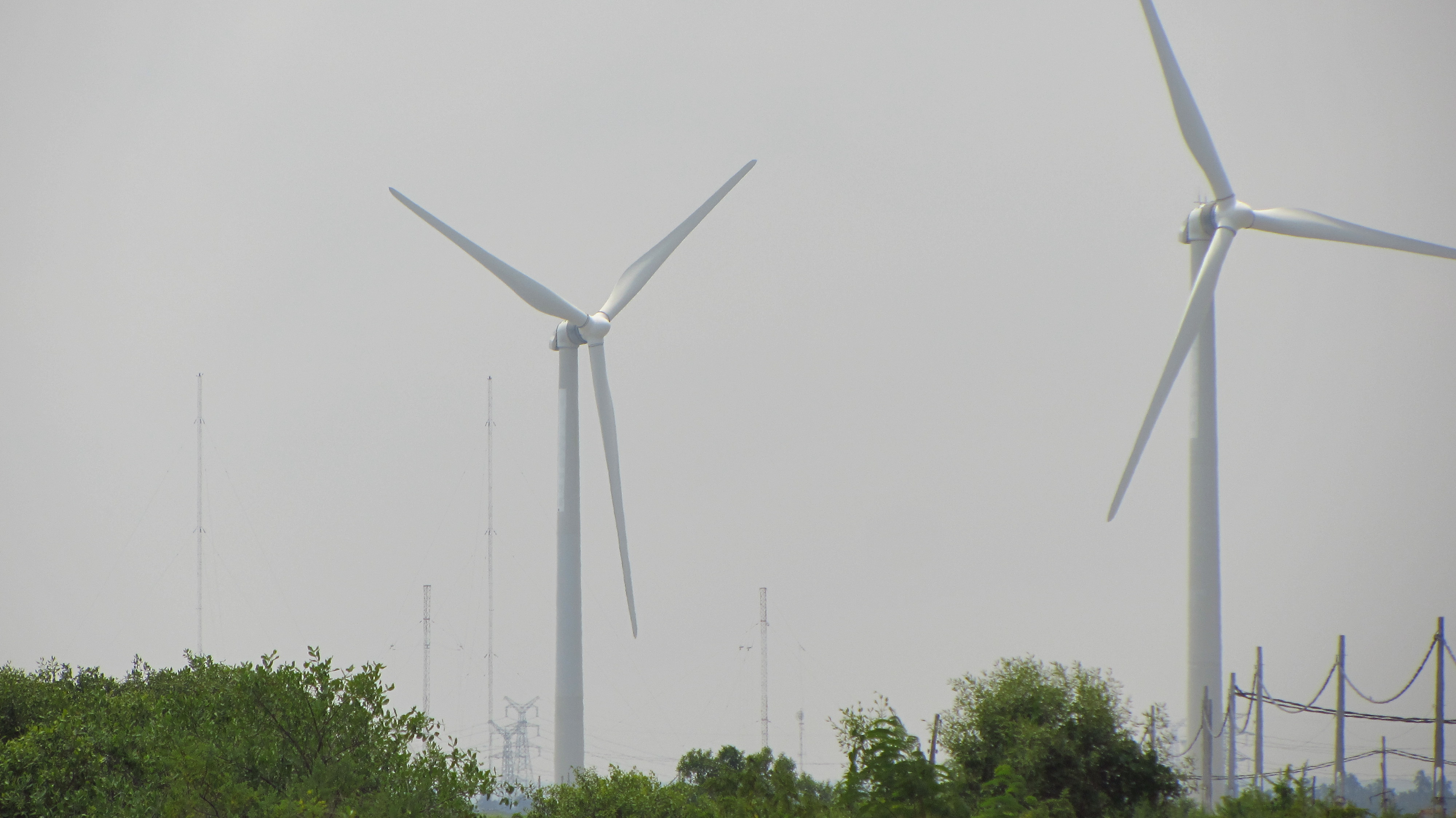
Two of the seven LTW-77-1.5 wind turbines at the site

Turbine locations
| Turbine | Coordinates |
|---|---|
| Turbine 1 | 07°58′52″N 79°46′33″E |
| Turbine 2 | 07°58′50″N 79°46′42″E |
| Turbine 3 | 07°58′46″N 79°46′52″E |
| Turbine 4 | 07°58′44″N 79°47′01″E |
| Turbine 5 | 07°58′42″N 79°47′10″E |
| Turbine 6 | 07°58′41″N 79°47′22″E |
| Turbine 7 | 07°58′40″N 79°47′31″E |

The plant utilizes seven Leitner Shriram LTW-77-1.5 1.5 MW wind turbines, spaced approximately 260 m (850 ft) apart on the southernmost shore of the Puttalam Lagoon. The turbine foundations were built by the International Construction Consortium at a cost of Rs.121 million (approximately US$930,000).

== See also ==
- Electricity in Sri Lanka
- List of power stations in Sri Lanka
