= Ace Embilipitiya Power Station =

Power station in Embilipitiya, Sri Lanka

Embilipitiya Power Station
- Country: Sri Lanka
- Coordinates: 6°17′06″N 80°50′56″E
- Status: Operational
- Commission date: 6 April 2005
- Construction cost: 8,000 million Rs (2005)
- Owner: Aitken Spence
- Operator: Ace Power Embilipitiya

Thermal power station
- Primary fuel: Fuel oil
- Site area: 44 acres (18 ha)

Power generation
- Units operational: 14 × 7.11 MW
- Make and model: CAT 16CM32C (14)
- Nameplate capacity: 100 MW

The Ace Embilipitiya Power Station (also sometimes referred to as the Embilipitiya Power Station) is a 100 MW thermal power station in Embilipitiya, Sri Lanka. The heavy fuel oil-run power station was commissioned in March 2005, and was operated by Aitken Spence (sometimes shortened to Ace). The power station consisted of fourteen Caterpillar 16CM32C generation units of 7.11 MW each, which consumed approximately 550 tonnes of fuel oil per day. The Ministry of Power and Energy discontinued purchasing power from the private power station after its license expired in 2015, and hence was subsequently decommissioned.

In March 2016 Ceylon Electricity Board decided to recommission the plant due to high electricity demand in the country. The facility cost approximately Rs. 8 billion to develop, and is built on a 44-acre (18 ha) land on a 33-year lease.

== See also ==
- Heladhanavi Power Station
- List of power stations in Sri Lanka
