= Nala Danavi Wind Farm =

Onshore wind farm in Erumbukkudal, on the Kalpitiya Peninsula, Sri Lanka

- Country: Sri Lanka
- Location: Kalpitiya Peninsula
- Coordinates: 08°05′23″N 79°42′33″E
- Status: Operational
- Commission date: 2014
- Owner: LTL Holdings (Pvt) Ltd
- Operator: Nala Danavi (Private) Limited

Power generation
- Units operational: 6 × 800 KW
- Nameplate capacity: 4.8 MW
- PUCSL License: EL/GS/14-04

The Nala Danavi Wind Farm (also known as the Erumbukkudal Wind Farm after its location) is a 4.8 megawatt onshore wind farm in Erumbukkudal, on the Kalpitiya Peninsula, Sri Lanka. The wind farm is operated by Nala Danavi (Private) Limited, which is a subsidiary of LTL Holdings. The facility consists of six wind turbines measuring 800 KW each.

Turbine locations
Turbine	Coordinates
Turbine 1	08°05′23″N 79°42′33″E
Turbine 2	08°05′33″N 79°42′36″E
Turbine 3	08°05′41″N 79°42′35″E
Turbine 4	08°05′54″N 79°42′38″E
Turbine 5	08°05′58″N 79°42′55″E
Turbine 6	08°05′54″N 79°43′04″E

== See also ==
- Electricity in Sri Lanka
- Pawan Danavi Wind Farm
