= Laugfs Solar Power Station =

Solar power station in Hambantota, Sri Lanka

- Country: Sri Lanka
- Location: Hambantota
- Coordinates: 6°13′47″N 81°04′48″E
- Status: Operational
- Construction began: 18 February 2016
- Commission date: October 2016
- Construction cost: 5,000 million Rs (2016)
- Owner: LAUGFS Holdings
- Operator: Laugfs Power

Solar farm
- Type: Standard PV
- Site area: 90 acres (36 ha)

Power generation
- Nameplate capacity: 20 MW
- Annual net output: 40 GWh

The Laugfs Solar Power Station is a 20-megawatt photovoltaic power station built 10 km (6.2 mi) north of Hambantota, in the Hambantota District of Sri Lanka. It is the single largest solar power station in the country. Construction of the Rs. 5 billion power station was ceremonially inaugurated on 18 February 2016, and completed in October 2016.

== Development ==
The pre-development of the solar farm was initially conducted as two separate 10-megawatt power stations. The original developers, Anorchi Lanka Limited and Irish Eco Power Lanka Limited conducted the feasibility studies and acquiring of the necessary licensing with the intention of subsequently selling the rights. The two facilities, with a combined area of 90 acres (36 ha), were sold to LAUGFS Holdings on 11 September 2015. As with most private power producers in the country, the owners of Anorchi and Irish Eco Power decided to operate under two separate companies in order to intentionally avoid development limitations such as the 10MW nameplate cap enforced in Sri Lanka.

== See also ==
- List of power stations in Sri Lanka
