= Lakvijaya Power Station =

Coal-fired power station in Norocholai, Sri Lanka

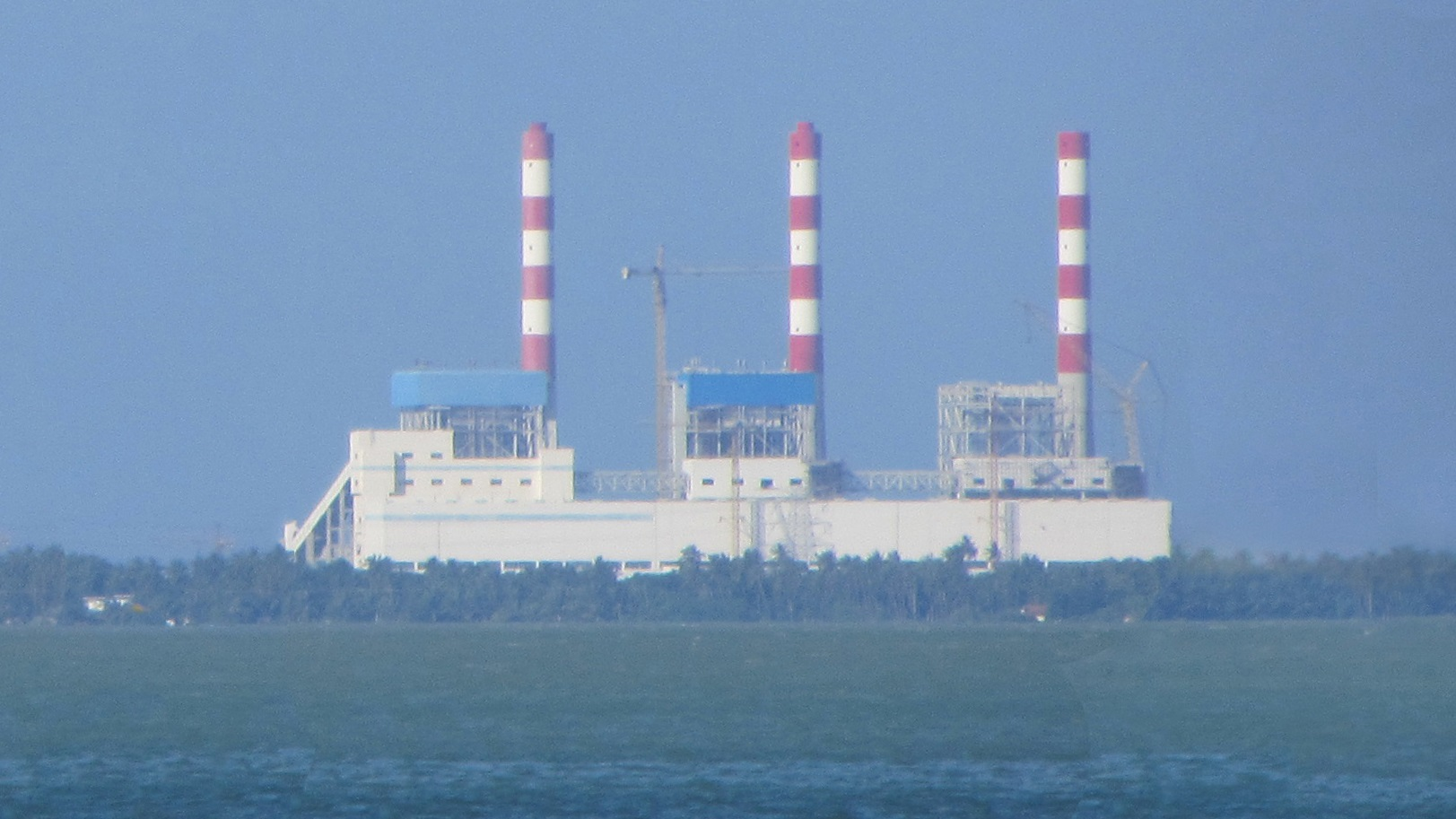
- Official name: ලක් විජය බලාගාරය
- Country: Sri Lanka
- Location: Puttalam
- Coordinates: 8°1′1.82″N 79°43′22.65″E
- Status: 0
- Construction began: 11 May 2006
- Commission date: 2011 (Unit 1); 2014 (Units 2 and 3)
- Construction cost: $1,350 million (2006)
- Owner: Government of Sri Lanka
- Operator: Ceylon Electricity Board
- Employees: About 1000

Thermal power station
- Primary fuel: Bituminous coal
- Site area: 213 acres (86 ha)

Power generation
- Units operational: 3 × 300 MW
- Make and model: Unknown (3)
- Nameplate capacity: 900 MW
- Annual net output: 2,200 GWh

External links
- Website: https://egl.lk/
- Commons: Related media on Commons

The Lakvijaya Power Station (Sinhala: ලක් විජය බලාගාරය, romanized: Lak Vijaya Balāgāraya) (also known as the Norochcholai Power Station (Sinhala: නොරොච්චෝලෙ ගල් අඟුරු බලාගාරය, romanized: Noroccōle Gal An̆guru Balāgāraya; Tamil: நுரைச்சோலை அனல்மின் நிலையம், romanized: Nuraiccōlai Aṉalmiṉ Nilaiyam), after its location) is the largest power station in Sri Lanka.

The power station is in Norocholai, Puttalam, on the southern end of the Kalpitiya Peninsula. Construction of the facility began on 11 May 2006, with the first unit commissioning on 22 March 2011. The first 300-megawatt phase was completed and ceremonially commissioned by President Mahinda Rajapaksa on 22 March 2011 at 18:27 local time, with the presence of Minister of Energy Champika Ranawaka, deputy Minister of Energy Premalal Jayasekara.

According to the Ceylon Electricity Board, the US$455 million first phase generates nearly 1.7 TWh of electricity annually — a significant amount when compared to Sri Lanka's total production of 11.5 TWh in 2011. The plant is connected to the grid via 115 km (71 mi) 220-kilovolt transmission line to Veyangoda. Power station exhausts are emitted through a 150 m (492 ft) tall chimney, one of the country's tallest man-made structures.

During its pre-development stages, protests were launched by residents living at the project site, claiming that they were deceived by the government.

== Incidents ==
The power station has experienced several outages and technical failures since Unit 1 entered service in 2011. It has been alleged by the Power and Renewable Energy Deputy Minister, Ajith P. Perera, that the power plant was built with substandard and outdated material and is below international standards, and that the government is unable to claim any damages as the Rajapaksa government agreed to use the materials specified in the agreement which are sub-standard.

- A large fire broke out on 24 October 2010. According to the Ceylon Electricity Board, there were no casualties. The Ministry of Power and Energy commented that damages to the facility would be borne by the constructors and not the government or the developers.
- On 22 July 2012, the power station ceased operations due to a leak in one of the thousands of tubes carrying water between the boilers. The country was put into controlled regional power outages to cope with the missing 300MW.
- On 8 August 2012, a tripping of the powerline from Lakvijaya caused the power station to cease operations.
- The generation capacity of the power station exceeded its designed levels of 300MW on 29 January 2013, causing a complete shutdown. The plant was reactivated a day later.
- On 13 March 2016, an island-wide power outage occurred, which caused the power plant to fail.
- Technical error in generator 2 of the Norochcholai coal power plant caused an island-wide blackout on 18 March 2019. The breakdown has caused a loss of 270 MW to the national grid as the Norochcholai coal power plant fulfills 15% of Sri Lanka's power supply.

== Operation ==
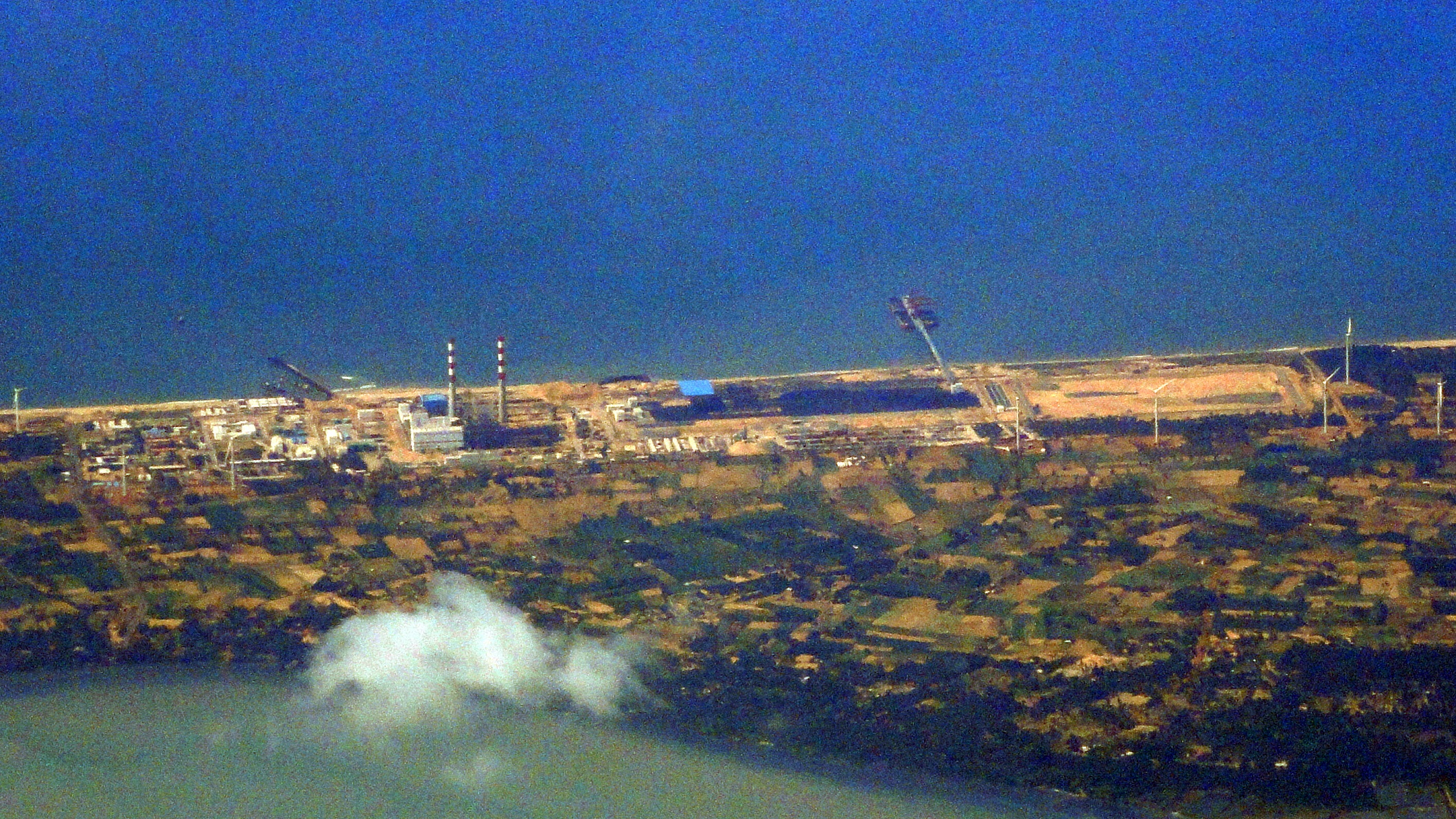
Aerial photo of the power station in January 2010.

In the plant, the electricity is produced using a steam turbine which is capable of producing 300 MW. Coal is used as the fuel to produce steam that will then be used to rotate the turbine at a speed of 3000 rpm. The coal is imported from Indonesia. The coal in India is cheaper as compared with Indonesia, but Indonesian coal is used since the Indian coal contains more sulfur. Despite this, the vessels that carry coal come from a Russian port.

At first the coal is brought from Indonesia via ships (65 tons per ship). The ships are anchored around 5 km from shore. This coal is brought in to the plant by using barges (long flat-bottomed boats) and then by conveyors.

The coal should be maintained around 10% moisture content immediately before it is used. It needs to be ground as powder before it is burnt. There are five "mills" that pulverize (grind) the coal. Four ball mills work at a time while another one is in standby.

Under the Ceylon Electricity Board's Long Term Generation Expansion Plan 2025–2044, the three Lakvijaya units are scheduled for phased retirement beginning in 2041, with coal-fired generation from the plant ending by 2043.

== Environmental issues ==
In 2026, the Sri Lankan Parliament's Sectoral Oversight Committee on Environment, Agriculture and Resource Sustainability raised concerns about the disposal of ash produced by the plant and instructed officials to prepare an environmentally appropriate disposal plan.

In May 2026, the committee appointed a subcommittee to investigate the environmental effects of the power station and submit recommendations.

== See also ==
- Electricity in Sri Lanka
- List of power stations in Sri Lanka
- Mampuri Wind Farms
- Sampur Power Station
