= Thambapavani Wind Farm =

Wind farm in Mannar, Sri Lanka

Mannar Island Wind Farm
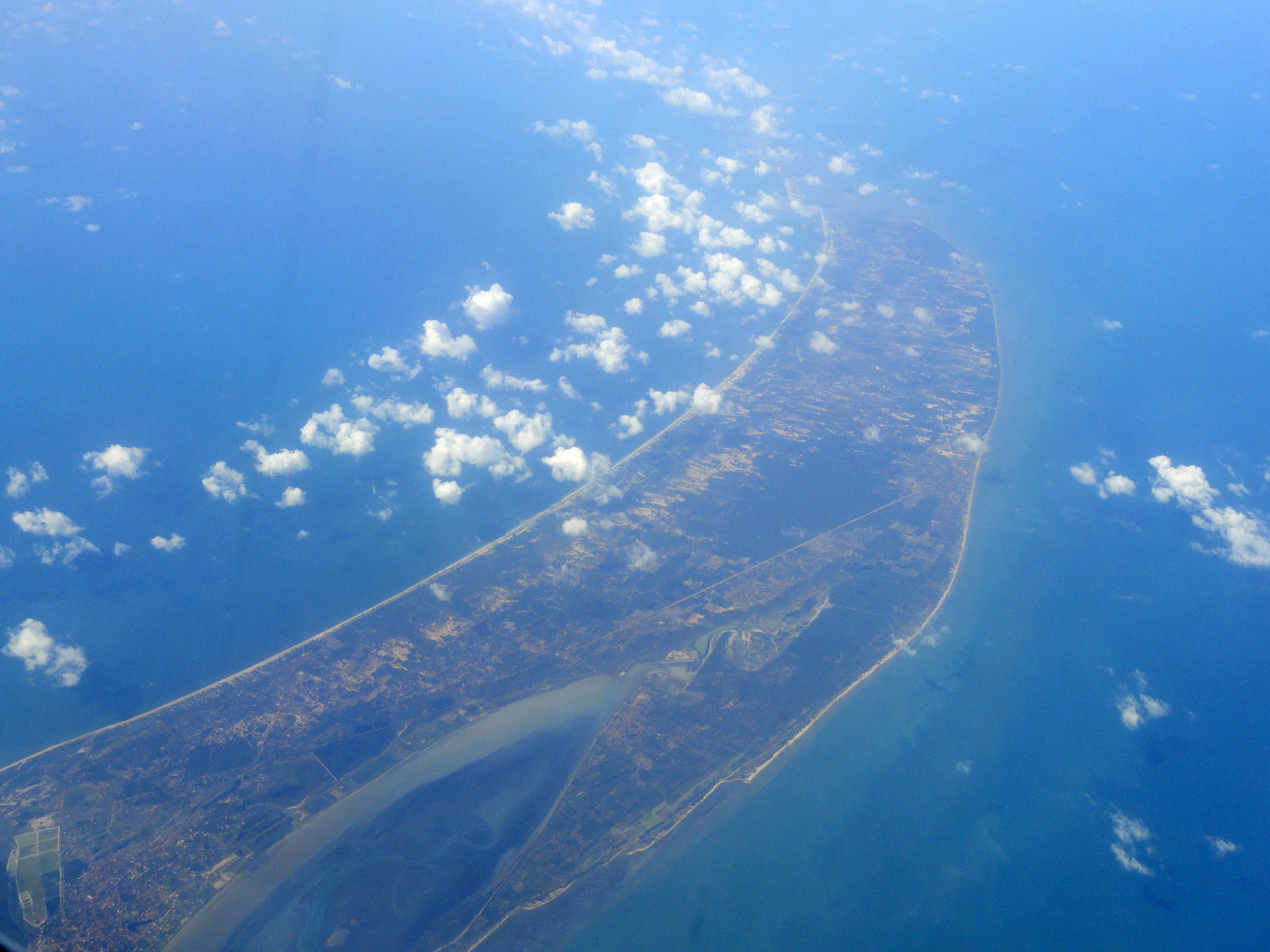
- Aerial view of Mannar Island from 2012, looking west
- Location within Northern Province
- Country: Sri Lanka
- Location: Mannar Island
- Coordinates: 09°03′01″N 79°47′13″E
- Status: Under Construction
- Construction began: March 2014
- Commission date: 8 December 2020
- Construction cost: US$ 200 million
- Owner: CEB

Wind farm
- Type: Onshore

Power generation
- Make and model: Vestas
- Nameplate capacity: 103.5 MW

The Thambapavani Wind Farm (formerly called Mannar Island Wind Farm or Mannar Wind Farm) is a 100-megawatt wind farm built on the southern coast of the Mannar Island, in Sri Lanka. The wind farm is named after Thambapanni; Pavan meaning wing in Sinhala language. The estimated project cost during initial planning was US$200 million; 78% of which borne by the Asian Development Bank, while the remaining 22% by the developers, including the Ceylon Electricity Board. It is the largest wind farm in Sri Lanka. Denmark-based wind turbine manufacturer Vestas supplied the turbines for the facility.

Tenders for the construction were called in April 2016. The wind farm is part of a larger 300-megawatt mixed-ownership wind power development plan on the Mannar Island. It was officially opened by the then Sri Lankan Prime minister Mahinda Rajapaksa on 8 December 2020.

== See also ==
- List of power stations in Sri Lanka
