= KCHT Power Station =

Waste-to-energy power station in Sri Lanka

- Country: Sri Lanka
- Status: Under construction
- Construction began: 10 August 2017
- Construction cost: $95 million (2017)
- Owner: KCHT Lanka Jang

Thermal power station
- Primary fuel: Municipal solid waste
- Feed-in tariff: 37.1 Sri Lankan rupee (per kilowatt-hour)

Power generation
- Nameplate capacity: 10 MW

The KCHT Power Station is a municipal solid waste-fired thermal power station currently under construction at Muthurajawela in Sri Lanka. It is being constructed together with the Aitken Spence Power Station, after it won the bid by the Urban Development Authority from a pool of 121 bidders, 19 of which were foreign. Construction of the facility began on 10 August 2017 and will cost approximately US$95 million, with an estimated completion slated for mid-2019.

The 10 megawatt power station will be operated by KCHT Lanka Jang (Private) Limited, a subsidiary of the South Korean company KCHT Holding. It will use 630 metric tons (1,390,000 lb) of waste from the Colombo and Gampaha suburbs. The generated power will be sold to the state-owned Ceylon Electricity Board at a rate of Rs. 37.10 per KWh generated. The remaining bottom ash resulting from the process would be used for road construction and other purposes, while the unusable fly ash residue (amounting to 2%) being disposed at locations already identified.

== See also ==
- List of power stations in Sri Lanka
- Muthurajawela wetlands
