= Sri Lanka Sustainable Energy Authority =

Agency overview
- Formed: October 1, 2007; 18 years ago
- Jurisdiction: Government of Sri Lanka
- Headquarters: 72, Ananda Coomaraswamy Mawatha, Colombo 07; 6.901466°N 79.873947°E
- Minister responsible: Kanchana Wijesekara, Minister of Power and Energy
- Agency executives: Eng. Ranjith Sepala, Chairman; Eng. J. M. Athula, Director General; Harsha Wickramasinghe, Deputy Director General (Demand Side Management); H.A. Vimal Nadeera, Deputy Director General (Supply Side Management)
- Parent department: Ministry of Power and Energy
- Key document: Sri Lanka Sustainable Energy Authority Act, No.35 of 2007
- Website: energy.gov.lk

The Sri Lanka Sustainable Energy Authority (or SLSEA) is the primary body responsible for the issuance of licenses for sustainable energy developments in Sri Lanka. In addition to being the key licence provider, it is also the organization responsible for promoting renewable energy and sustainable developments in the country.

== See also ==
- Ceylon Electricity Board
- Electricity in Sri Lanka
- List of dams and reservoirs in Sri Lanka
- List of power stations in Sri Lanka
