= Sampur Power Station =

Cancelled coal-fired power project in Sampur, Sri Lanka

- Country: Sri Lanka
- Location: Sampur
- Coordinates: 8°29′10″N 81°18′00″E
- Status: Cancelled
- Operators: CEB; NTPC Limited

Thermal power station
- Primary fuel: Coal

Power generation
- Units cancelled: 2 × 250 MW
- Nameplate capacity: 500 MW

The Sampur Power Station (also called Trincomalee Coal Power Plant or TCPP) was a proposed coal-fired power station planned for Sampur, Trincomalee, Sri Lanka. The project was never constructed.

On 29 December 2006, the National Thermal Power Corporation (NTPC), the Ceylon Electricity Board (CEB) and the Government of Sri Lanka signed a memorandum of agreement to develop a 500 MW (2 × 250 MW) coal-fired power project at Sampur through a joint venture between NTPC and CEB. A Joint Venture and Shareholder Agreement between NTPC and CEB was signed on 6 September 2011 to implement the project, with the two parties holding equal equity in the joint venture. Trincomalee Power Company Limited (TPCL), the joint venture company established to implement the project, was incorporated on 26 September 2011.

On 7 October 2013, TPCL signed agreements with the relevant Sri Lankan authorities for the proposed 500 MW coal-fired power station, including agreements relating to power purchase, implementation, investment, land lease and coal supply. A 2015 publication of Sri Lanka's Ministry of Power and Energy stated that the government had decided not to pursue additional coal power plants beyond the Sampur project.

Despite the agreements signed in 2013, construction of the power station did not begin. The project faced delays related to environmental approvals, land and other regulatory issues, and TPCL later ceased development activities in 2016. In February 2016, the Central Environmental Authority approved the project's environmental impact assessment. Environmental Foundation (Guarantee) Limited filed a Fundamental Rights application in the Supreme Court of Sri Lanka on 31 May 2016 challenging the proposed power plant.

On 13 September 2016, the Attorney General's Department informed the Supreme Court of Sri Lanka that the Ministry of Power and Renewable Energy had decided not to proceed with construction of the proposed coal power station in Sampur. The Fundamental Rights proceedings were subsequently terminated. The Auditor General subsequently recorded that TPCL had ceased development of the Sampur coal power plant during 2016 following the government's decision not to pursue the project. Previously capitalised project expenditure was subsequently impaired and written off.

== Proposed replacement solar project ==
Following the cancellation of the coal project, Cabinet approval was obtained for TPCL to develop a 50 MW solar power plant on the land that had been allocated for the Sampur coal project. In February 2025, the Sri Lankan Cabinet approved a revised plan for solar power plants at Sampur comprising 50 MW in the first phase and 70 MW in the second phase, for a total planned capacity of 120 MW. The project is being developed through TPCL, a joint venture between the CEB and NTPC.

On 5 April 2025, construction of the 50 MW first phase of the Sampur Solar Power Plant was formally launched. The second phase is planned to increase the project's total capacity to 120 MW.

== See also ==
- Energy in Sri Lanka
- List of power stations in Sri Lanka
