= Pawan Danavi Wind Farm =

Wind farm in western Sri Lanka

- Country: Sri Lanka
- Location: Kalpitiya, Puttalam
- Coordinates: 08°02′56″N 79°43′08″E
- Status: Operational
- Construction began: Late 2011
- Commission date: Unknown
- Owner: LTL Holdings (Pvt) Ltd
- Operator: Pawan Danavi (Pvt) Ltd

Wind farm
- Type: Onshore
- Site elevation: Sea-level

Power generation
- Units operational: 12 × 850 KW
- Make and model: Gamesa G58-850
- Nameplate capacity: 10.2 MW
- Capacity factor: 26.57%

The Pawan Danavi Wind Farm (also internally known as the Kalpitiya Wind Farm, and LTL Holdings Wind Farm after its parent company) is a 10.2 MW onshore wind farm located near Kalpitiya, in the Puttalam District of Sri Lanka. The wind farm utilizes twelve of Gamesa's G58-850 kW wind turbines. Pawan Danavi is a subsidiary company of LTL Holdings.

Turbine locations
| Turbine | Coordinates |
|---|---|
| Turbine 1 | 08°02′56″N 79°43′08″E |
| Turbine 2 | 08°02′43″N 79°43′08″E |
| Turbine 3 | 08°02′36″N 79°43′10″E |
| Turbine 4 | 08°02′30″N 79°43′16″E |
| Turbine 5 | 08°02′24″N 79°43′18″E |
| Turbine 6 | 08°02′19″N 79°43′19″E |
| Turbine 7 | 08°02′05″N 79°43′09″E |
| Turbine 8 | 08°02′03″N 79°42′53″E |
| Turbine 9 | 08°02′22″N 79°42′47″E |
| Turbine 10 | 08°02′30″N 79°42′44″E |
| Turbine 11 | 08°02′39″N 79°42′44″E |
| Turbine 12 | 08°02′48″N 79°42′40″E |

== See also ==
- Electricity in Sri Lanka
- List of power stations in Sri Lanka
