= Willwind Wind Farm =

Wind farm in Bithugalgama, Sri Lanka

Vallibel Wind Farm
- Country: Sri Lanka
- Location: Bithugalgama
- Coordinates: 6°36′40″N 80°44′44″E
- Status: Operational
- Commission date: Unknown
- Owner: Vallibel Finance
- Operator: Vallibel Willwind

Wind farm
- Type: Onshore
- PUCSL license: EL/GS/10-081

Power generation
- Units operational: 7 × 0.121 MW
- Make and model: Vawin (7)
- Nameplate capacity: 850 kW

The Vallibel Wind Farm (also called Willwind Wind Farm and Willpita Wind Farm) is a small 850 Kilowatt (0.85 MW) onshore wind farm built near the village of Bithugalgama, in the Ratnapura District of Sri Lanka. The wind farm is owned and operated by Willwind (Private) Limited. The facility consists of seven wind turbines measuring approximately 121 KW each.

Turbine locations
Turbine	Coordinates
Turbine 1	06°36′40″N 80°44′44″E
Turbine 2	06°36′36″N 80°44′45″E
Turbine 3	06°36′29″N 80°44′43″E
Turbine 4	06°36′25″N 80°44′44″E
Turbine 5	06°36′18″N 80°44′40″E
Turbine 6	06°36′14″N 80°44′37″E
Turbine 7	06°36′11″N 80°44′35″E

== See also ==
- Electricity in Sri Lanka
- Ambewela Aitken Spence Wind Farm
