= Heladhanavi Power Station =

Power station in Puttalam, Sri Lanka

- Country: Sri Lanka
- Location: Puttalam
- Coordinates: 8°00′46″N 79°52′13″E
- Status: Decommissioned
- Commission date: August 2004
- Decommission date: 2015
- Owner: Hemas Holdings
- Operator: Heladhanavi Limited

Thermal power station
- Primary fuel: Fuel oil

Power generation
- Units decommissioned: 6 × 100 MW
- Nameplate capacity: 100 MW

The Heladhanavi Power Station was a 100 MW thermal power station in Puttalam, Sri Lanka. The fuel oil-run power station was commissioned in August 2004, and was operated by Heladhanavi Limited, a subsidiary of Hemas Holdings. It was decommissioned in 2015 by request from the Ministry of Power and Energy. The power station consisted of six Wärtsilä 18V46 generation units of 17 MW each.

== See also ==
- List of power stations in Sri Lanka
