= Ceylon Electricity Board =

Sri Lankan electricity company (1969–2026)

Ceylon Electricity Board - CEB
- Native name: ලංකා විදුලිබල මණ්ඩලය - ලංවිම (இலங்கை மின்சார சபை - இமிச)
- Company type: Government-owned corporation
- Industry: Electricity generation; Electricity transmission; Electricity distribution; Electricity retailing
- Founded: 6 June 1969
- Defunct: 9 March 2026
- Fate: Restructured
- Headquarters: 50, Sir Chittampalam A. Gardiner Mawatha, Colombo, Sri Lanka
- Parent: Ministry of Power
- Subsidiaries: Lanka Electricity Company (55.2%); Lanka Coal Company; LTL Holdings
- Website: www.ceb.lk

The Ceylon Electricity Board (CEB; Sinhala: ලංකා විදුලිබල මණ්ඩලය - ලංවිම, romanized: Lankā Vidulibala Mandalaya - Lanwima; Tamil: இலங்கை மின்சார சபை - இமிச) was a state-owned electricity company in Sri Lanka. It was a controlled utility of Sri Lanka that took care of the general energy facilities of the island. With a market share of nearly 100%, the CEB controlled all major functions of electricity generation, transmission, distribution and retailing in Sri Lanka. It was one of only two on-grid electricity companies in the country; the other being the Lanka Electricity Company (LECO). The company earned approximately Rs 204.7 billion in 2014, with a total of nearly 5.42 million consumer accounts.

The CEB was established by the CEB Act No. 17 of 1969, and was legally obligated to develop and maintain an efficient, coordinated and economical system of electricity supply in accordance with any licenses issued. The Ministry of Power and Energy was the responsible ministry above the CEB.

The Ceylon Electricity Board was officially dissolved with effect from 9 March 2026 as per the Sri Lanka Electricity Act, No. 36 of 2024 and replaced by six state-owned companies (SOE) under the government's CEB restructuring programme.

== Subsidiaries ==
The CEB had following subsidiaries:

- Lanka Electricity Company
- LTL Holdings (Pvt) Ltd
- Lanka Coal Company Ltd
- Sri Lanka Energies (Pvt) Ltd (100% subsidiary of CEB)
- Trincomalee Power Company Limited (Joint Venture)

== Electricity generation ==
Electricity generation in Sri Lanka by source:
1. Coal 43.18 (42.5%)
2. Oil 8.47 (8.33%)
3. Hydropower 47.32 (46.5%)
4. Wind 2.7 (2.66%)

=== Hydropower ===
Electricity generation by the CEB was done primarily via hydropower. Hydropower is the oldest and most dependent source of electricity generation in Sri Lanka, taking a share of nearly 42% of the total available grid capacity in December 2014, and 37% of the power generated in 2014. Hydropower generation facilities have been constantly under development since the introduction of the national grid but are currently declining due to the exhaustion of the resource.

In 2014, then Media Spokesperson of the CEB Senajith Dassanayake said the generation of hydropower has dropped to 37%; as a result, 60% of electricity needs would need to be fulfilled by thermal energy.

=== Coal power development ===
The Lakvijaya Power Station in Puttalam is the only coal-fired power station in the country, and was owned by CEB. It was commissioned in 2011 and was synchronized with the system on 13 February 2011.

On 17 September 2014, the US$1.35 billion coal-fired power station was commissioned by Chinese President Xi Jinping during a visit to Sri Lanka. The Export–Import Bank of China provided a loan of US$450 million for the first 300-megawatt unit at the power plant. The power plant was officially commenced on 16 September 2014. The power station added an additional 300 megawatts of electrical capacity to the grid.

The Sampur Power Station was a proposed coal-fired power station intended to be built in Trincomalee, however, construction of the power station never took place.

=== Wind power development ===
The CEB launched the Thambapavani Wind Farm, Sri Lanka's largest wind farm, which was later added to the national grid. The project began in 2014 and was officially opened on 8 December 2020. The wind farm currently generates more than 100 megawatts.

== Controversies ==
=== Blackouts and shutdowns ===
- In October 2010, during a test run, a fire broke out in a chimney due to clogging. Splits in the cooling system piping triggered a shutdown of the power plant. The Ceylon Electricity Board decided to institute blackouts for households and industries for three hours a day until the fault was fully repaired.
- In December 2013, more leaks were discovered in the cooling system, and the CEB decided that the plant was too dangerous to operate at the moment. The CEB requested assistance from China Machinery Engineering Corporation (CMEC), and the company said that it would take about six weeks to fix the faults. After negotiations, the plant was repaired by CMEC and brought back online. A day later, it failed once more and was shut down again for six more days.
- In 2014, then Minister of Power and Energy Pavithra Wanniarachchi revealed that the Norochcholai power plant had been offline for 271 days out of the 1086 days since it began operating.
- On 25 February 2016, the entire country of Sri Lanka experienced a 3-hour blackout due to a bolt of lightning striking the national power grid.
- On 13 March 2016, Sri Lanka experienced another 7-hour island-wide blackout due to a damaged transformer in the 220 kV substation at Biyagama. Prime minister Ranil Wickremesinghe appointed a five-member committee to investigate the blackout. Due to initial suspicions of sabotage, president Maithripala Sirisena deployed troops to guard electrical installations until the investigation was completed. The CEB also reported that the outage caused Lakvijaya Coal Power Plant to fail, resulting in a loss of 900 megawatts to the national grid. On 23 March 2016, Power and Renewable Energy Minister Ranjith Siyambalapitiya notified parliament that the reason for the power outage was a lack of regular maintenance of power installations. The engineer in charge of the Biyagama Substation had previously reported that a key transformer needed maintenance; however, no repairs were made.
- 2019 Sri Lanka electricity crisis – In March 2019, the CEB decided to impose four-hour rolling power cuts on a scheduled basis throughout Sri Lanka after the national grid capacity failed to meet the increased demand for power due to dry climate, and due to limited power generation.

=== Losses ===
Ceylon Electricity Board lost 25.5 billion rupees in 2011, and ran up debts of 121 billion rupees with a petroleum distributor and independent power producers.

In 2012, the CEB lost 61.2 billion rupees and the Ceylon Petroleum Corporation which supplied fuel below cost 89.7 billion rupees. To cover up the loss, the CEB increased power tariffs on a large scale. The CEB expected to get revenues of 223 billion rupees—or 45 billion rupees more than the earlier tariff—from the price hike, but subsequently lost 33 billion rupees in 2013 on total expenses of 256 billion rupees.

On 16 September 2014, after officially opening a completed $1.35 billion Chinese-financed 900 MW coal power plant project, then-incumbent president Mahinda Rajapaksa addressed the nation claiming that electricity bills would be reduced by 25% for the general population. The CEB stated that it would take about two weeks to come up with a process of creating electricity bills to reflect the reduction in prices.

=== Employee tax ===
The CEB has been accused of tax fraud by the Campaign for Free and Fair Elections (CaFFE), which has claimed that CEB had not deducted pay-as-you-earn tax from its engineers and senior staff since 2010, amounting to Rs. 3465 million. CaFFE has claimed that this amount has been recovered from the consumer instead.

== Restructuring ==
In August 2022, a restructuring committee was appointed as per the approval of the Cabinet of Ministers to submit proposals to restructure the CEB within a month. Committee members consisted of former and current administrative officers of the Sri Lankan Government Service.

The Sri Lanka Electricity Act, No. 36 of 2024 for restructuring of the CEB was passed in the Parliament on 17 September 2024 by a majority of 44 votes. On 9 March 2026 at 00:00 SLST, the Ceylon Electricity Board was officially dissolved and replaced by six state-owned companies (SOE) under the government's CEB restructuring programme. The six new companies are further divided into four main and two subsidiary companies. The areas of responsibility for each new organisation are as follows:

SOE	Responsibility
Electricity Distribution Lanka (Private) Limited	Power distribution. All distribution areas, except those under LECO, will fall under EDL.
Electricity Generation Lanka (Private) Limited	Power generation. All power generation plants formerly owned by the CEB are transferred to EGL.
National System Operator (Private) Limited	Power transmission system planning, procurement, future competitive generation, and categorised supply of power to consumers.
National Transmission Network Service Provider (Private) Limited	Power transmission lines and related infrastructure.
Employees Fund (Private) Limited	Pension and provident fund of all employees. Overseen by the Central Bank of Sri Lanka.
Energy Ventures Lanka (Private) Limited	Minor functions that do not fall under the main entities.

== See also ==
- Electricity sector in Sri Lanka
- India Sri Lanka HVDC Interconnection
- List of power stations in Sri Lanka
