= List of bridges in Sri Lanka =

This is a list of bridges in Sri Lanka.

Bridge	Location	Coordinates	Length	Route	Crosses	Completed	Ref
Palk Strait Bridge	Palk Strait	10°00′00″N 79°45′00″E	23 km (14 mi)	AH	Palk Strait	Proposed	
Mahawewa Bridge			3.1 km (1.9 mi)	E02		2014	
Aviththawa Bridge			695 m (2,280 ft)	E01	Benthara River	2011	
Angampitiya Bridge	Ethul Kotte		600 m (2,000 ft)	AA000	Nawala	2026	
Bentota Bridge	Bentota	06°25′37″N 79°59′53″E	250 m (820 ft)	A3	Bentota River	1902	
Kinniya Bridge	Kinniya	8°30′25.20″N 81°11′27.60″E	396 m (1,299 ft)	A15	Kinniya Lagoon	2009	
Upparu Bridge	Upparu	8°28′11.50″N 81°12′10.60″E	315 m (1,033 ft)	A15	Uppu Aru	2011	
Manampitiya Bridge	Manampitiya	07°54′47″N 81°05′21″E	302 m (991 ft)	A11	Mahaweli Ganga	2007	
Irakkandi Bridge	Irakkandi	08°43′42″N 81°10′17″E	300 m (980 ft)	B424	Irrakkandi Lagoon	2009	
Kallady Bridge	Kallady	7°43′09.50″N 81°42′26.40″E	288 m (945 ft)	A4	Batticaloa Lagoon	1924	
Sangupiddy Bridge	Karaitivu / Sangupiddy	9°33′57.60″N 80°11′52.70″E	288 m (945 ft)	A32	Jaffna Lagoon	2011	
Arippu Bridge	Arippu	8°48′13.70″N 79°57′02.30″E	258 m (846 ft)	B403	Aruvi Aru	2011	
Oddamavadi Bridge	Oddamavadi	7°55′17″N 81°30′54″E	250 m (820 ft)	A15	Valaichchenai lagoon	2010	
Gangai Bridge	Gangaithurai	8°27′36.80″N 81°13′49.10″E	245 m (804 ft)	A15	Mahavali Gangai	2011	
Manmunai Bridge	Manmunai	7°38′16.84″N 81°43′47.79″E	210 m (690 ft)		Batticaloa Lagoon	2014	
Ralkuli Bridge	Ralkuli	8°27′38.90″N 81°15′11.80″E	175 m (574 ft)	A15		2011	
Mannar Bridge	Mannar	8°57′44.90″N 79°55′08.60″E	157 m (515 ft)	A14		2010	
Wakwella Bridge	Wakwella	6°06′21.80″N 80°11′25.90″E	150 m (490 ft)		Gin Ganga	1999	
Verugal Bridge	Verugal	6.876709°N 81.061622°E	105 m (344 ft)	A15	Verugal Aru	2011	
Nine Arch Bridge	Demodara	6.876709°N 81.061622°E				1921	
Kayankerni Bridge	Kayankerni	7°58′14.70″N 81°31′00.40″E	85 m (279 ft)	A15		2011	
