= 2011 in Sri Lanka =

- Decades: 1990s; 2000s; 2010s; 2020s
- See also: Other events of 2011; Timeline of Sri Lankan history

Events from the year 2011 in Sri Lanka.

== Incumbents ==
- President – Mahinda Rajapaksa
- Prime Minister – D. M. Jayaratne
- Chief Justice – Shirani Bandaranayake

=== Governors ===
- Central Province – Tikiri Kobbekaduwa
- Eastern Province – Mohan Wijewickrama
- North Central Province – Karunarathna Divulgane
- Northern Province – G. A. Chandrasiri
- North Western Province – Tissa Balalla
- Sabaragamuwa Province – W. J. M. Lokubandara
- Southern Province – Kumari Balasuriya
- Uva Province – Nanda Mathew
- Western Province – Alavi Moulana

=== Chief Ministers ===
- Central Province – Sarath Ekanayake
- Eastern Province – Sivanesathurai Chandrakanthan
- North Central Province – Berty Premalal Dissanayake
- North Western Province – Athula Wijesinghe
- Sabaragamuwa Province – Maheepala Herath
- Southern Province – Shan Wijayalal De Silva
- Uva Province – Shasheendra Rajapaksa
- Western Province – Prasanna Ranatunga

== Events ==
=== January to March ===
- 1 January – The Parliamentary Council is officially established, replacing the Constitutional Council under the 18th Amendment to the Constitution of Sri Lanka.
- 12–14 January – At least 27 people are killed and 1 million are rendered homeless following flooding in Sri Lanka.
- 16 January – The Sangupiddy Bridge is opened to the public.
- 18 January – Flood victims besiege a government office in the Batticaloa District, over alleged unfair distribution of emergency aid.
- 25 January – Former Commander of the Sri Lanka Army Sarath Fonseka loses an appeal to retain his parliamentary seat.
- 6 February – Severe flooding leaves 13 dead in Sri Lanka.
- 1 March – 2011 Sri Lanka Kfir mid-air collision: Two IA Kfirs belonging to the No. 10 Squadron collide near Yakkala, Gampaha. Both pilots ejected from their aircraft: while one pilot managed to land safely, the other pilot's parachute failed to open, and he succumbed to his injuries on impact.
- 8 March – Jayantha Ketagoda is sworn in as a Member of Parliament representing the Colombo District, replacing Sarath Fonseka.
- 17 March – 2011 Sri Lankan local elections: The first phase of the local government elections are held. The ruling United People's Freedom Alliance emerges as the largest party, winning 1,854 of the 3,032 available seats and securing 55.90% of all votes.
- 31 March – The Report of the Secretary-General's Panel of Experts on Accountability in Sri Lanka is published by a panel of experts appointed by United Nations Secretary General (UNSG) Ban Ki-moon. The report concerns alleged war crimes committed by the Sri Lanka Army and the Liberation Tigers of Tamil Eelam during the final stages of the Sri Lankan civil war.

=== April to June ===
- 2 April – At the final of the 2011 Cricket World Cup, Sri Lanka loses to India by six wickets.
- 5 April – Kumar Sangakkara resigns as captain of Sri Lanka's one-day and Twenty20 sides.
- May 2011 – The Surrey Village Cricket Ground in Maggona, Kalutara is opened to the public.
- 2 May – Thousands of Sri Lankans protest the United Nations report calling for both sides in the Sri Lankan civil war to be investigated over possible war crimes. Protesters praised president Mahinda Rajapaksa whilst denouncing the UN.
- 9 May – The Army School of Logistics is established in Trincomalee.
- 24 May – 2011 Sri Lanka worker protests: Several free-trade zone (FTZ) workers in Negombo and Katunayake begin non-violent demonstrations, in protest of a new pension bill proposed by the government.
- 30 May – 2011 Sri Lanka worker protests: Roshen Chanaka, a 21-year old FTZ worker, is shot by police officers in the streets of Katunayake. Chanaka's death prompts widespread outrage amongst protesting workers, causing the protests to increase in intensity. The Sri Lanka Army is deployed by president Mahinda Rajapaksa to help suppress the protests.
- 9 June – In response to the workers' protests, the government elects to suspend the proposed pension bill.
- 14 June – Sri Lanka's Killing Fields is broadcast by British TV station Channel 4. The documentary goes into intensive detail over war crimes committed by the Sri Lanka Army during the final stages of the Sri Lankan civil war.

=== July to September ===
- 5 July – The Northern Province, an area which had been severely affected by the civil war, is reopened to foreigners and journalists holding passports.
- 23 July – 2011 Sri Lankan local elections: The second phase of the local government elections are held. The ruling United People's Freedom Alliance emerges as the largest party, winning 512 of the 875 available seats and securing 61.21% of all votes.
- 26 July – Sri Lanka Police hunt 20 local television actresses alleged to be part of a prostitution ring.
- 1 August – Lies Agreed Upon is produced and aired by the Sri Lankan Ministry of Defence in response to the documentary aired by Channel 4.
- 17 September – 2011 Alawwa rail accident: Sri Lanka Railways S11, a passenger train, drives into an observation car on the back of a stationary Intercity Express train near the Alawwa railway station. The accident results in the deaths of 5 individuals and leaves over 30 injured.

=== October to December ===
- 8 October – 2011 Sri Lankan local elections: The third and final phase of the local government elections are held. The ruling United People's Freedom Alliance emerges as the largest party, winning 245 of the 420 available seats and securing 51.94% of all votes.
- 16 October – The Arippu Bridge is opened to the public.
- 19 October – Five bridges across the Eastern Province are opened to the public: the Gangai Bridge, Kayankerni Bridge, Ralkuli Bridge, Upparu Bridge, and Verugal Bridge.
- 11 December – A 35-year old male suspect is arrested in relation to the Kotakethana murders, with the suspect's DNA matching with six of the murders.
- 25 December – Khuram Shaikh murder: While staying at a resort in Tangalle, British national Khuram Shaikh Zaman is murdered and his Russian girlfriend Victoria Alexandronva is gang raped by a group of about six to eight men.

== Deaths ==
- 1 January – P. Chandrasekaran, 52, politician, MP (1994–2010)
- 4 February – H. A. Perera, 59, actor
- 26 March – Abeywardena Balasuriya, 63, musician, playback singer, writer, television program producer
- 12 April – Udaya Wickramasinghe, 70, cricket umpire
- 30 May – Roshen Chanaka, 21, factory worker
- 3 June – K. M. M. B. Kulatunga, puisne justice of the Supreme Court
- 23 June – Vernon Mendis, 84, diplomat
- 29 July – C. I. Gunasekera, 90, cricketer
- 29 December – Gratien Ananda, 53, singer, composer, songwriter, lyricist
