= Mannar =

Mannar may refer to the following places:

== India ==
- Mannar, Alappuzha, a town in Chengannur Taluk, Kerala

== Sri Lanka ==
- Mannar District, one of 25 districts in Sri Lanka
  - Mannar Island, an island within the district
  - Mannar Bridge, a bridge connecting the island to the mainland
  - Mannar, Sri Lanka, a large town on the island
- Mannar Electoral District, an historical electoral district between 1947 and 1989
- Mannar line, railway line which runs onto the island via a separate bridge

== See also ==
- Gulf of Mannar, the sea between India and Sri Lanka
- Mannar massacre (disambiguation)
- Mannar Mathai, a fictional character played by Innocent in the Indian films Ramji Rao Speaking (1989), Mannar Mathai Speaking (1995) and Mannar Mathai Speaking 2 (2014)
- Mannar, fictional tribe in the 2023 Indian film Salaar
- Mannargudi, a town in Tamil Nadu, India
- Mannar Vagaiyara, a 2018 Indian film
