= Neriyakulam railway station =

Railway station in Neriyakulam, Sri Lanka

Neriyakulam railway station நேரியகுளம் தொடருந்து நிலையம் නෙරියාකුලම් දුම්රිය ස්ථානය

General information
- Location: Neriyakulam; Sri Lanka
- Coordinates: 8°36′59.80″N 80°21′25.30″E
- System: Sri Lankan Railway Station
- Owner: Sri Lanka Railways
- Line: Mannar Line

Other information
- Status: Functioning

History
- Rebuilt: 14 May 2013

Services
Preceding station	Sri Lanka Railways	Following station
Medawachchiya toward Anuradhapura	Mannar Line	Cheddikulam toward Madhu Road
Location

Neriyakulam railway station (Tamil: நேரியகுளம் தொடருந்து நிலையம் Nēriyakuḷam toṭaruntu nilaiyam) (Sinhala: නෙරියාකුලම් අඛණ්ඩ ස්ථානය) is a railway station in the town of Neriyakulam in northern Sri Lanka. Owned by Sri Lanka Railways, the state-owned railway operator, the station is part of the Mannar Line which links Mannar Island with the capital Colombo. The station was not functioning between 1990 and 2013 due to the civil war. The Mannar Line between Medawachchiya and Madhu Road, which includes Neriyakulam, was re-opened on 14 May 2013.
