= Verugal Bridge =

- Coordinates: 8°15′11″N 81°22′23″E
- Carries: Motor vehicles on the A15 highway
- Crosses: Verugal Aru
- Locale: Verugal, Trincomalee District

Characteristics
- Total length: 105 m (344 ft)

History
- Construction cost: LKR250 million
- Inaugurated: 19 October 2011

Verugal Bridge is a road bridge across Verugal Aru in eastern Sri Lanka. The bridge was formally opened on 19 October 2011.

The bridge is 105 m (344 ft) long. The bridge cost 250 million rupees (US$2.3 million) and was financed by a soft loan from the French Development Agency's Trincomalee Integrated Infrastructure Project and the Sri Lankan Government's Kilakku Vasantham (Eastern Awakening) programme. The bridge is part of the A15 Batticaloa-Trincomalee highway. The bridge replaced a ferry boat service that had been transporting people and vehicles across the river.
