= Cheddikulam railway station =

Railway station in Cheddikulam, Sri Lanka

Cheddikulam railway station செட்டிகுளம் චෙඪ්ඪිකුලම

General information
- Location: Cheddikulam; Sri Lanka
- System: Sri Lankan Railway Station
- Owner: Sri Lanka Railways
- Line: Mannar Line

Other information
- Status: Functioning

History
- Rebuilt: 14 May 2013

Services
Preceding station	Sri Lanka Railways	Following station
Neriyakulam toward Anuradhapura	Mannar Line	Madhu Road
Location

Cheddikulam railway station (Tamil: செட்டிகுளம் தொடருந்து நிலையம் Ceṭṭikuḷam toṭaruntu nilaiyam) (Sinhala: චෙටිකුලම් අඛණ්ඩ ස්ථානය) is a railway station in the town of Cheddikulam in northern Sri Lanka. Owned by Sri Lanka Railways, the state-owned railway operator, the station is part of the Mannar Line which links Mannar Island with the capital Colombo. The station was not functioning between 1990 and 2013 due to the civil war. The Mannar Line between Medawachchiya and Madhu Road, which includes Cheddikulam, was re-opened on 14 May 2013.
