= Mannar Bridge =

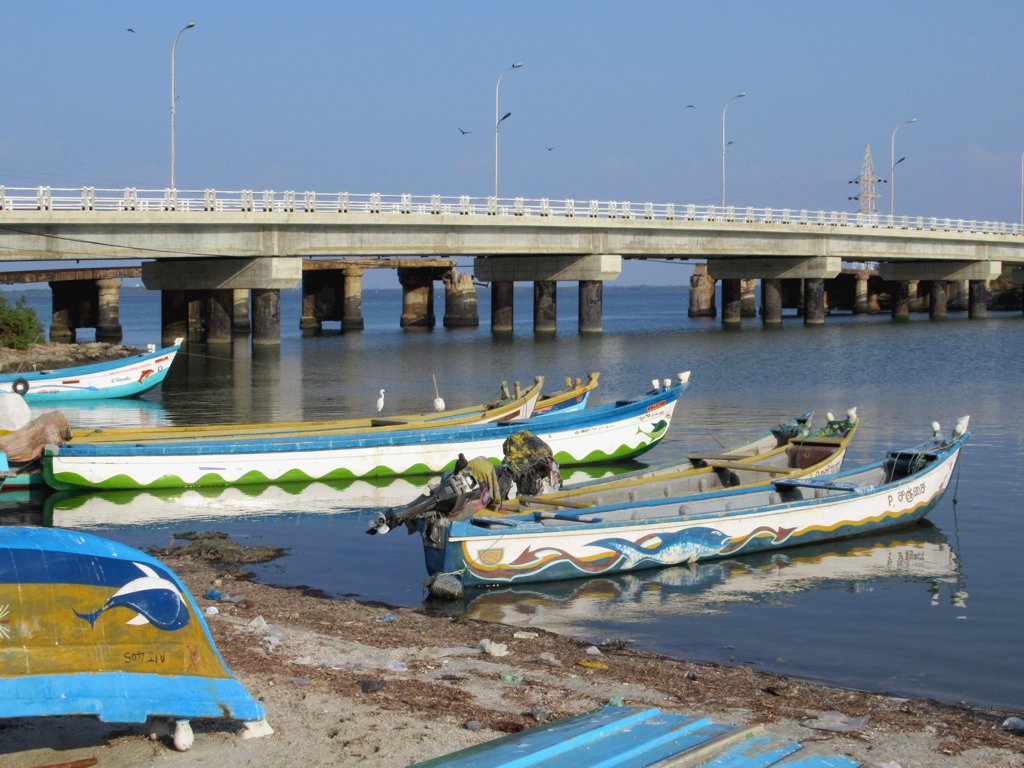
- Coordinates: 8°57′44.90″N 79°55′08.60″E
- Carries: Motor vehicles on the A14 highway and pedestrians
- Locale: Mannar, Mannar District, Sri Lanka
- Owner: Ministry of Ports & Highways
- Maintained by: Road Development Authority

Characteristics
- Total length: 157 m (515 ft)
- Width: 10.4 m (34 ft)

History
- Construction cost: LKR2.46 billion
- Inaugurated: 18 March 2010

Location
- Interactive map of Mannar Bridge

Mannar Bridge is a road bridge in north-western Sri Lanka. It connects Mannar Island with the mainland and is the only road bridge to the densely populated island.

== History ==
A narrow single lane bridge and causeway linking Mannar island to the mainland was built in the 1930s. Parts of the bridge collapsed in 1990 after it was blown up by the rebel Liberation Tigers of Tamil Eelam. A temporary bailey bridge was built but it could not accommodate vehicles over 10 tonnes.

In 2007 plans were drawn up to build a new bridge on the site. Construction of a new bridge began in 2007 but was halted in January 2008 as the Sri Lankan Civil War flared up again. Construction recommenced following the end of the civil war and was completed in March 2010. At the same time the causeway was extended to 3.14 km long and 11m wide. The bridge was formally opened on 18 March 2010.

The two-lane bridge is 157 m (515 ft) long and 10.4 m (34 ft) wide. It cost 2.46 billion rupees (US$22 million) and was financed by a grant from the Japan International Cooperation Agency.

The bridge carries the A14 road, connecting Medawachchiya and Talaimannar.
