= S. H. Hasbullah =

Sri Lankan activist and academic

- எஸ். எச். ஹஸ்புல்லாஹ்
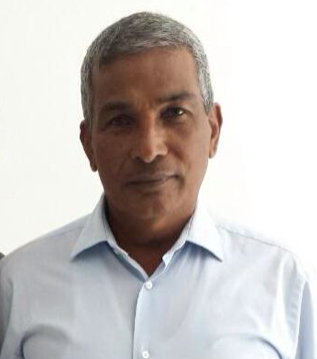
- Born: 3 September 1950; Erukkulampiddy, Ceylon
- Died: 25 August 2018 (aged 67); Jaffna, Sri Lanka
- Education: University of Sri Lanka; University of British Columbia
- Occupation: Academic

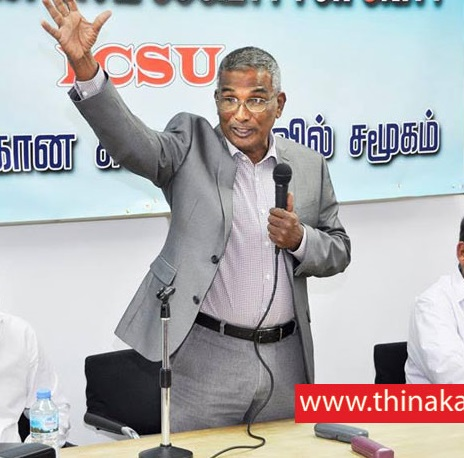
Professor S. H. Hasbullah during a talk. Photo by Thinakaran

Shahul Hameed Hasbullah (Tamil: சாஹுல் ஹமீத் ஹஸ்புல்லாஹ், romanized: Cāhul Hamīt Haspullāh; 3 September 1950 – 25 August 2018) was a Sri Lankan social activist, geographer and academic.

== Early life and family ==
Hasbullah was born on 3 September 1950 (Note: Another source gives Hasbullah's date of birth as 11 September 1950.) in Erukkulampiddy in northern Ceylon. He was educated at Erukkulampiddy Central College. He obtained a B.A. degree from the Peradeniya campus of the University of Sri Lanka in 1975. He also received M.A. and Ph.D. degrees from the University of British Columbia.

Hasbullah had a son and two daughters.

== Career ==
Hasbullah was professor of geography at the University of Peradeniya. He was a visiting scholar at the University of Zurich, University of Edinburgh, Norwegian University of Science and Technology and University of British Columbia (2004). He was a visiting Fulbright scholar at Georgetown University's Institute for the Study of International Migration.

Hasbullah was a resource person during the 2003 Sri Lankan peace talks facilitated by Norway in Thailand, Germany, and Japan and was member of the Sub-committee on Immediate and Humanitarian Needs of the War-torn Areas of Sri Lanka. He was a UGC appointed member of the council of the University of Jaffna. He was a member of the board of directors of the International Centre for Ethnic Studies (ICES). He was a member of the 2017-18 provincial council delimitation committee.

Being an internally displaced person himself, Hasbullah extensively worked on documenting the plight of the ethnic cleansing and expulsion of Muslims from the Northern province by LTTE. Hasbullah's academic contributions during the last three decades are a significant scientific and historical record of this event. His two notable earliest works are the Report on the Loss of Movable and Immovable Assets of Muslims Evicted from the Northern Province in October 1990 and Family Information of the Muslim Refugees, Ousted from Northern Province in October 1990. Hasbullah had submitted parts of this report to the parliament to provide remedies and resettlement prospects for the internally displaced refugees. However, the government or politicians did not make any significant progress on this issue. After 30 years of preserving this document, Hasbullah submitted this documentation to the International Centre for Ethnic Studies (ICES) in Colombo to digitalize and preserve it in collaboration with a university in the Netherlands.

On 25 August 2018 Hasbullah suffered a heart attack during a meeting at the University of Jaffna and died after being admitted to Jaffna Teaching Hospital. His death came the day after the delimitation committee's report was rejected by Parliament by 139 votes to nil. Hasbullah had submitted an alternate report opposing the delimitation committee's report which he believed had marginalised island-wide minority representation.

== Works ==
Hasbullah wrote several books and research papers including:

- The Fertility Behaviour of Muslims of Sri Lanka (1984, University of British Columbia)
- The Growth and Variations of Rural Non-farm Activities in Sri Lanka Since Independence (1989, University of British Columbia)
- Muslim Refugees, the Forgotten People in Sri Lanka's Ethnic Conflict (2001, Research and Action Forum for Social Development)
- Peace Negotiations and Social Processes in Sri Lanka (2006, Norwegian Ministry of Foreign Affairs, co-author Øivind Fuglerud)
- Sri Lankan Society in an Era of Globalization: Struggling to Create a New Social Order (2009, SAGE Publishing, co-author Barrie M. Morrison)
- Muslim Geographies, Violence and the Antinomies of Community in Eastern Sri Lanka (2013, The Geographical Journal, co-author Benedikt Korf)
- Checkpoint, Temple, Church and Mosque: A Collaborative Ethnography of War and Peace (2014, Pluto Press, co-authors Jonathan Goodhand, Bart Klem, Benedikt Korf, Kalinga Tudor Silva and Jonathan Spencer)
- Denying the Right to Return: Resettlement in Musali South and the Wilpattu Controversy (2015, Kandy Forum)
- Social Mobilisation of Livelihood Concerns and Everyday Encounters with an Ambiguous State (International Centre for Ethnic Studies, co-author Urs Geiser)
- Negotiating Access to Land in Eastern Sri Lanka - Social Mobilization of Livelihood Concerns and Everyday Encounters with an Ambiguous State (2019, International Centre for Ethnic Studies, co-author Urs Geiser)
- For a Political-Economic Understanding of Land Conflicts in Eastern Sri Lanka (2020, Groundviews, co-author Urs Geiser)
