= Upparu Bridge =

- Coordinates: 8°28′11.50″N 81°12′10.60″E
- Carries: Motor vehicles on the A15 highway
- Crosses: Uppu Aru
- Locale: Upparu, Trincomalee District

Characteristics
- Total length: 315 m (1,033 ft)

History
- Construction cost: LKR995 million
- Inaugurated: 19 October 2011

Upparu Bridge is a road bridge across Uppu Aru in eastern Sri Lanka. The bridge was formally opened on 19 October 2011.

The bridge is 315 m (1,033 ft) long. The bridge cost 995 million rupees (US$9 million) and was financed by a soft loan from the French Development Agency's Trincomalee Integrated Infrastructure Project and the Sri Lankan Government's Kilakku Vasantham (Eastern Awakening) programme. The bridge is part of the A15 Batticaloa-Trincomalee highway. The bridge replaced a ferry boat service that had been transporting people and vehicles across the river.
