= Mannar fort =

Mannar Fort
- Mannar, Sri Lanka
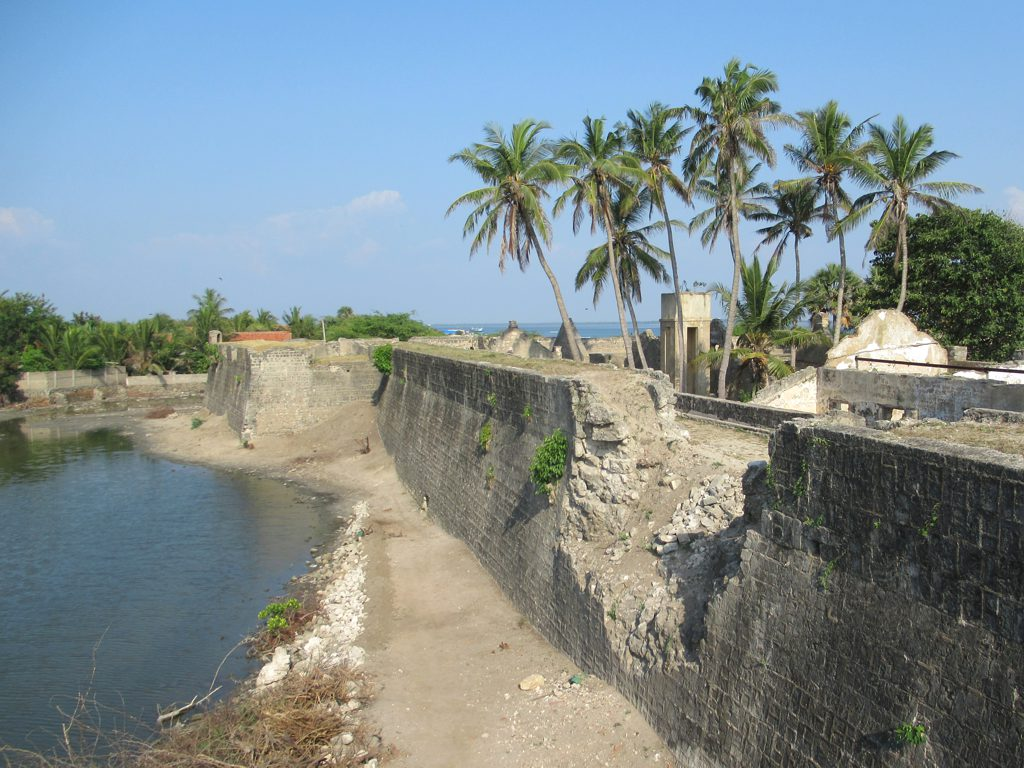
- The fort in 2018

Site information
- Type: Defence fort
- Open to the public: Yes
- Condition: Good

Location
- Location within Northern Province
- Coordinates: 8.975864°N 79.917013°E

Site history
- Built: 1560
- Built by: Portuguese and Dutch
- Materials: Granite Stones and bricks

Mannar Fort (Tamil: மன்னார்க் கோட்டை, romanized: Maṉṉārk Kōṭṭai; Sinhala: මන්නාරම් බලකොටුව Mannaram Balakotuwa) is located on Mannar Island, Sri Lanka. It was built by Portuguese in 1560 and christened São Jorge. The fort fell to the Dutch in 1658, and they rebuilt the fort in 1696. In 1795 the British occupied the fort following the surrender by the Dutch.

It is a square-shaped fort with four bastions and is located next to the new bridge that connects the mainland with the Mannar Island.

The fort is currently occupied by the Department of Archeology.
