= Ralkuli Bridge =

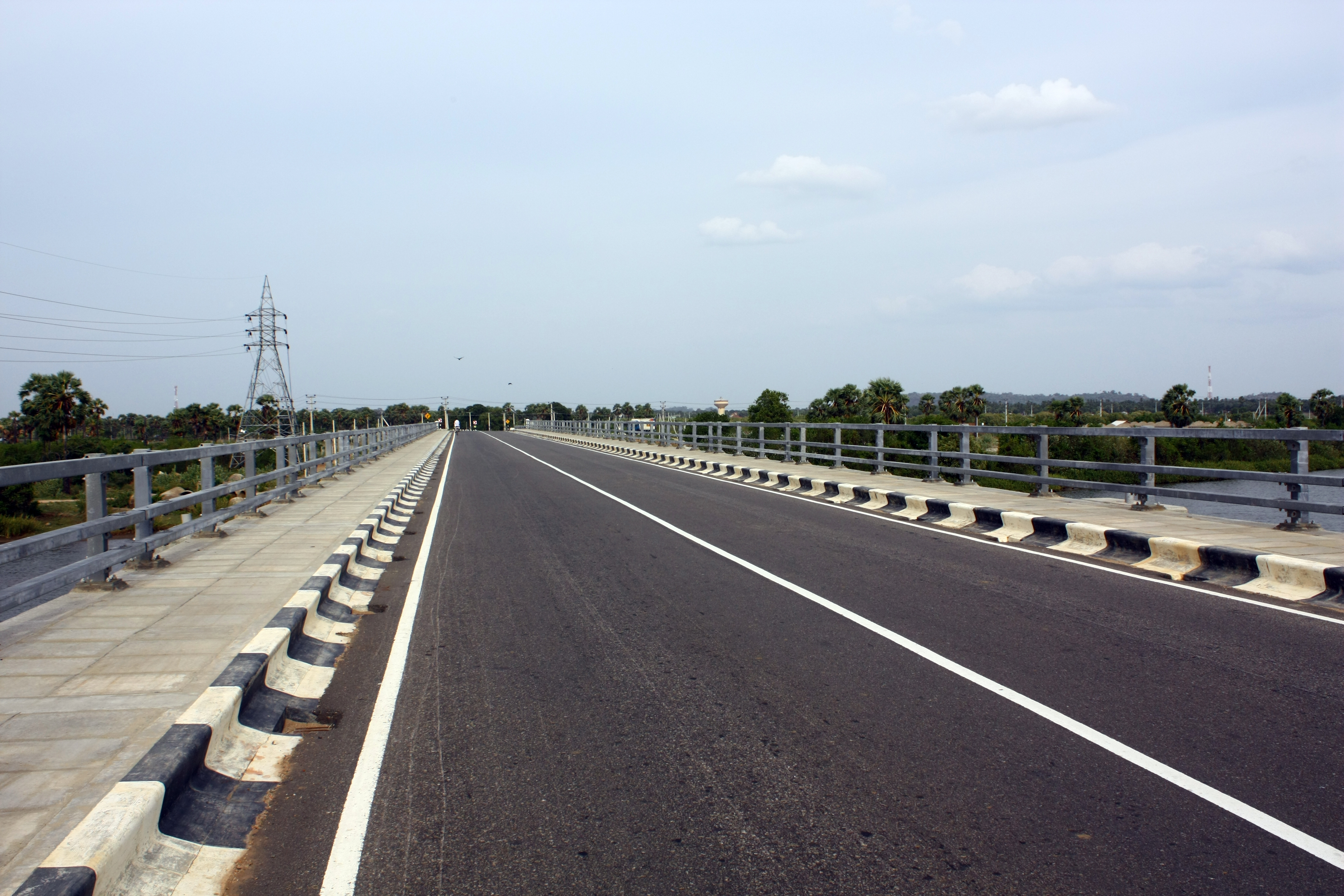
- Ralkuli Bridge
- Coordinates: 8°26′50.2″N 81°14′37.2″E
- Carries: Motor vehicles on the A15 highway
- Locale: Ralkuli, Trincomalee District

Characteristics
- Total length: 175 m (574 ft)

History
- Construction cost: LKR571 million
- Inaugurated: 19 October 2011

Location
- Interactive map of Ralkuli Bridge

Ralkuli Bridge is a road bridge in eastern Sri Lanka. The bridge was formally opened on 19 October 2011.

The bridge is 175 m (574 ft) long. The bridge cost 571 million rupees (US$5.2 million) and was financed by a soft loan from the French Development Agency's Trincomalee Integrated Infrastructure Project and the Sri Lankan Government's Kilakku Vasantham (Eastern Awakening) programme. The bridge is part of the A15 Batticaloa-Trincomalee highway. The bridge replaced a ferry boat service that had been transporting people and vehicles across the river.
