= Pesalai Church attack =

2006 terrorist attack in Sri Lanka

Coordinates: 9°5′N 79°50′E

The Pesalai church attack occurred on June 17, 2006 when armed gunmen shot at houses as well as Our lady of heart church in Pesalai, a village on Mannar Island, Sri Lanka. Six civilians were killed and at least 47 were injured in the attack. The eyewitness accused the governmental troops for this attack. The Sri Lankan Navy has denied this and has counter accused the rebel LTTE of being the responsible party. The Government of Sri Lanka instituted an investigation into this incident and has identified the responsible party.

== Background ==
Mannar District is in the north-west of Sri Lanka and is one of the least developed districts in the country. It has a substantial Catholic and Muslim population. Pesalai has the largest Catholic community in the Mannar District. As it is a coastal hamlet, there have been many clashes between the LTTE and the Sri Lankan Navy there. On June 17, 2006, the Sri Lankan Navy and LTTE clashed in the sea during the early morning, resulting in the deaths of 30 people. Consequently, 200 people took shelter at the Our lady of victory church, amid fear of the violence escalating. An earlier incident, where a confrontation between the LTTE and the Sri Lankan Army destroyed many houses, also added to the fear of the people.

== Attack on the Church ==
Survivors and witnesses of the attack claimed that a group of armed men in shorts and blue T-shirts shot indiscriminately at houses. Later, some more men came and shot at the church for about 10 minutes. They then reportedly rolled two grenades into the church. One grenade hit a window and ricocheted back. To ensure that the second had more of an impact, an attacker put his hand through one window that had not been properly shut and rolled it along the ground into the most populated area of the Church. Finally, they moved to the front of the church and shot before leaving. This attack left 47 people injured.

== Further attack ==
The survivors also claimed that navy sailors had walked down the village, indiscriminately shooting at the houses. In addition to the damages to the houses, a further 40 boats and 45 wadiyas were destroyed in the incident, and it is estimated that their losses exceeded 50 million rupees (₹50,000,000). The burning of the boats was a major problem for the village, as most of the population relied on fishing for income. The attack on the surrounding villages left four more fishermen dead. All of them were shot through the mouth and killed on the beach. The remains of one more man were found in a burned boat. Many huts were also burned.

== Reactions ==
The eyewitnesses to the attack have accused the Sri Lankan Navy of being responsible for the atrocity. This account was also confirmed by an international aid worker. However, the Sri Lankan Ministry first claimed that the church was caught in the middle of a firefight. Later, the Defense Ministry website denied this accusation and instead blamed the LTTE for the attack. The Sri Lankan Ministry of Defense website also accused the local Roman Catholic bishop, Rayappu Joseph, of being a rebel sympathizer. The president, Mahinda Rajapaksa, instituted an investigation into this incident. and the investigation identified the responsible parties.

Bishop Rayappu Joshep, in a letter to the Vatican, claimed that the Church "has been desecrated by innocent blood being shed [in it] by unjust aggressors, the Sri Lanka Navy". He further added "Today I buried the six civilians murdered by the Navy at Pesalai yesterday" Bishop Rauappu accused the navy for the disappearance of 4 people, including a three-year-old child, on December 23, 2006. A priest from the diocese also claimed “From what I heard from reliable sources, the hand grenade lobbed inside the church was indeed thrown by a member of the navy.”

== See also ==
- List of attacks on civilians attributed to Sri Lankan government forces
