= Kayankerni Bridge =

Kayankerni Bridge காயங்கேணிப் பாலம்
- Coordinates: 7°58′14.70″N 81°31′00.40″E
- Carries: Motor vehicles on the A15 highway
- Locale: Kayankerni, Batticaloa District

Characteristics
- Total length: 85 m (279 ft)

History
- Construction cost: LKR202 million
- Inaugurated: 19 October 2011

Kayankerni Bridge is a road bridge in eastern Sri Lanka. The bridge was formally opened on 19 October 2011.

The bridge is 85 m (279 ft) long. The bridge cost 202 million rupees (US$1.8 million) and was financed by a soft loan from the French Development Agency's Trincomalee Integrated Infrastructure Project and the Sri Lankan Government's Kilakku Vasantham (Eastern Awakening) programme. The bridge is part of the A15 Batticaloa-Trincomalee highway. The bridge replaced a ferry boat service that had been transporting people and vehicles across the river.
