= Madhu Road railway station =

Railway station in Madhu, Sri Lanka

Madhu Road railway station மடு றோட் මධු පාර දුම්රිය ස්ථානය

General information
- Location: Madhu; Sri Lanka
- Coordinates: 8°46′32.10″N 80°08′51.70″E
- System: Sri Lankan Railway Station
- Owner: Sri Lanka Railways
- Line: Mannar Line

Other information
- Status: Functioning

History
- Rebuilt: 14 May 2013

Services
Preceding station	Sri Lanka Railways	Following station
Cheddikulam toward Anuradhapura	Mannar Line	Terminus
Location

Madhu Road railway station (Tamil: மடு றோட் தொடருந்து நிலையம் Maṭu ṟōṭ toṭaruntu nilaiyam) (Sinhala: ගිලෙන්න පාර අඛණ්ඩ ස්ථානය) is a railway station in the town of Madhu in northern Sri Lanka. The station serves pilgrims visiting the Shrine of Our Lady of Madhu. Owned by Sri Lanka Railways, the state-owned railway operator, the station is part of the Mannar Line which links Mannar Island with the capital Colombo. The station was not functioning between 1990 and 2013 due to the civil war. The Mannar Line between Medawachchiya and Madhu Road was re-opened on 14 May 2013.
