= Sangupiddy Bridge =

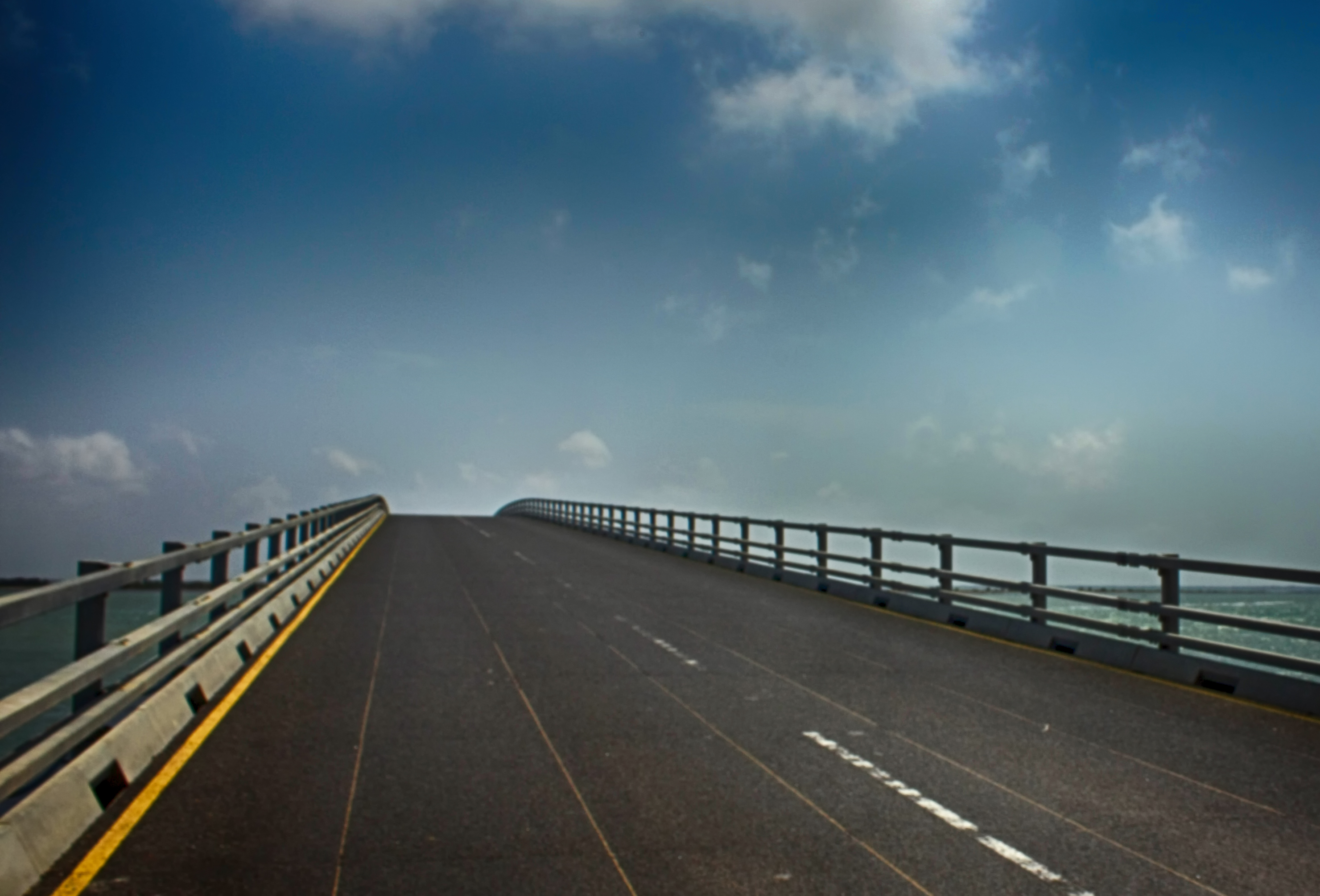
- Sangupiddy Bridge
- Coordinates: 9°33′57.60″N 80°11′52.70″E
- Carries: Motor vehicles on the A32 highway
- Crosses: Jaffna Lagoon
- Locale: Sangupiddy, Kilinochchi District/ Karaitivu, Jaffna District
- Owner: Ministry of Ports & Highways
- Maintained by: Road Development Authority

Characteristics
- Total length: 288 m (945 ft)
- Width: 7.35 m (24 ft)

History
- Designer: Mabey and Johnson
- Constructed by: Access Engineering
- Construction cost: LKR1.037 billion
- Inaugurated: 16 January 2011

Sangupiddy Bridge (Changkupiddy Bridge) is a road bridge across Jaffna Lagoon in northern Sri Lanka. It connects Sangupiddy in Kilinochchi District to Karaitivu in Jaffna District. It is one of only two road bridges connecting the densely populated Jaffna Peninsula with the mainland.

== History ==
In July 1932, during British colonial rule, plans were drawn up to build a causeway (the Mahadeva Causeway) across the shallow waters of the Jaffna lagoon, linking Sangupiddy, near Poonakari, with Karaitivu, near Navatkuly. The plans weren't implemented fully due to protests from local fishermen and salt producers. The partially built causeway was nevertheless used by locals until the civil war prevented them doing so.

In December 2009, following the end of the civil war, plans were drawn to build a bridge on the site of the causeway. The Sri Lankan Ministry of Ports and Highways had ordered an Atlas type bridge from British company Mabey and Johnson for the flyover at the Panadura junction in Colombo but the bridge was instead used for the Sangupiddy Bridge. Construction began in April 2010, with erection of 7-span bridge commencing in September 2010. Construction was carried out by Access Engineering, a Sri Lankan company. The bridge was completed in eight months. The bridge was formally opened on 16 January 2011.

The two lane bridge is 288m long and 7.35m wide. It consists of a steel girder structure and an ante steel deck system sitting on a reinforced cement concrete structure with pile foundations. The bridge cost 1.037 billion rupees (US$9.4 million) and was financed by a soft loan from the British Government's Steel Bridge Program.

The bridge is part of the A32 Jaffna-Mannar highway. Prior to construction of the bridge the only road connection between Jaffna Peninsula and the mainland was at Elephant Pass. Sangupiddy Bridge reduces the journey from the southern Sri Lanka to Jaffna by 110 km (68 mi) or three hours.
