= Arippu Bridge =

- Coordinates: 8.8038°N 79.9506°E
- Carries: Motor vehicles on the B403 highway
- Crosses: Aruvi Aru
- Locale: Arippu, Mannar District

Characteristics
- Total length: 258 m (846 ft)
- Width: 7.35 m (24 ft)

History
- Construction cost: LKR540 million
- Inaugurated: 16 October 2011

Arippu Bridge (also known as the Thallady-Arippu Bridge) is a road bridge across Aruvi Aru (Malvathu Oya) in north western Sri Lanka. The bridge was formally opened on 16 October 2011.

The bridge is 258 m (846 ft) long and 7.35 m (24 ft) wide. The bridge cost 540 million rupees (US$4.9 million) and was financed by a soft loan from the British Government's Steel Bridge Programme. The bridge is part of the B403 South Coast Road which connects Mannar with Puttalam.
