= Gangai Bridge =

- Coordinates: 8°27′36.80″N 81°13′49.10″E
- Carries: Motor vehicles on the A15 highway
- Crosses: Mahavali Gangai
- Locale: Gangaithurai, Trincomalee District

Characteristics
- Total length: 245 m (804 ft)

History
- Construction cost: LKR956 million
- Inaugurated: 19 October 2011

Gangai Bridge is a road bridge across Mahavali Gangai (Mahaweli Ganga) in eastern Sri Lanka. The bridge was formally opened on 19 October 2011.

The bridge is 245 m (804 ft) long. The bridge cost 956 million rupees (US$8.7 million) and was financed by a soft loan from the French Development Agency's Trincomalee Integrated Infrastructure Project and the Sri Lankan Government's Kilakku Vasantham (Eastern Awakening) programme. The bridge is part of the A15 Batticaloa-Trincomalee highway. The bridge replaced a ferry boat service that had been transporting people and vehicles across the river.
