= Madhu, Sri Lanka =

Madhu: மடு; ගිලෙන්න
- Town
- Location within Northern Province
- Coordinates: 8°51′0″N 80°12′0″E
- Country: Sri Lanka
- Province: Northern
- District: Mannar
- DS Division: Madhu

Population (2012)
  - Total: 7,711

Ethnic groups
  - Sri Lankan Tamils: 87.9%
  - Sri Lankan Moors: 7.2%
  - Sinhalese: 4.3%

Religion
  - Hindu: 48.1%
  - Roman Catholic: 38.9%
  - Muslim: 7.2%

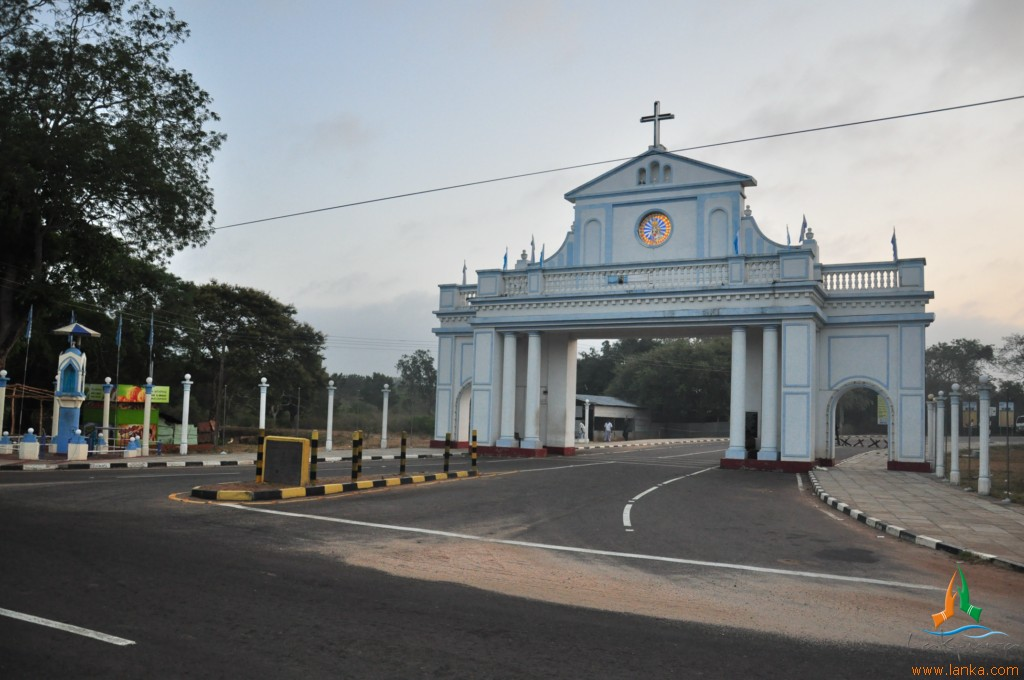

Madhu (Tamil: மடு, Sinhala: ගිලෙන්න) is a town in Mannar District, Sri Lanka. The prominent church and pilgrimage site, the Shrine of Our Lady of Madhu, is located here. There are also several Hindu temples all throughout the city.

== Infrastructure ==
Madhu has a railway station (Madhu Road station) on the Mannar Line, with services to Medawachchiya.
