= Ullackalie Lagoon =

Ullackalie Lagoon உல்லைக்கழி
- Location within Sri Lanka
- Location: Trincomalee District, Sri Lanka
- Coordinates: 8°22′N 81°22′E
- Type: Lagoon
- Primary inflows: Verugal Aru; Uppu Aru
- Primary outflows: Indian Ocean
- Max. length: 7 kilometres (4.3 mi)
- Max. width: 2 kilometres (1.2 mi)
- Surface area: 13 square kilometres (5.0 sq mi)
- Max. depth: 2 metres (6.6 ft)
- Surface elevation: Sea level

Ullackalie Lagoon (Tamil: உல்லைக்கழி Ullaikkaḻi) is a lagoon in Trincomalee District, eastern Sri Lanka.

The lagoon is fed by a number of small rivers including Verugal Aru and Uppu Aru. It is linked to the sea by a narrow channel to the south. The lagoon's water is brackish.

The lagoon is surrounded by evergreen forest and scrubland. The land is used for subsistence fishing.

The lagoon has extensive mangroves. The lagoon attracts a wide variety of water birds including ducks and other shorebirds.

The western part of the lagoon was designated an animal sanctuary in 1970.
