= Erukkalampiddy =

Erukkalampiddy எருக்கலம்பிட்டி එරුකලම්පිඪ්ඪි
- Town
- Location in Sri Lanka
- Coordinates: 9°2′N 79°52′E
- Country: Sri Lanka
- Province: Northern Province
- District: Mannar District
- Time zone: UTC+5:30 (Sri Lanka Standard Time)

Erukkalampiddy or Erukkalampiddi (Tamil: எருக்கலம்பிட்டி, romanized: Erukkalampiṭṭi; Sinhala: එරුකලම්පිඪ්ඪි, romanized: Erukalampiḍhḍhi) is a small coastal town on the eastern coast of Mannar Island in Mannar District, northern Province Sri Lanka. It lies along the A14 road northwest of Mannar. It contains a maternity home, a post office and a fish market. It contains several Muslim landmarks such as Erukkalampiddy Kattubawa Jumma Masjid, Erukkalampiddy Mohideen Jumma Masjid, Erukklampiddy Central College and Erukkalampiddy Muslim Mahalir Maha Vidyalayam, one of the first ladies' government Muslim schools in Northern Province. The principal language is Tamil.
