= Bentota Bridge =

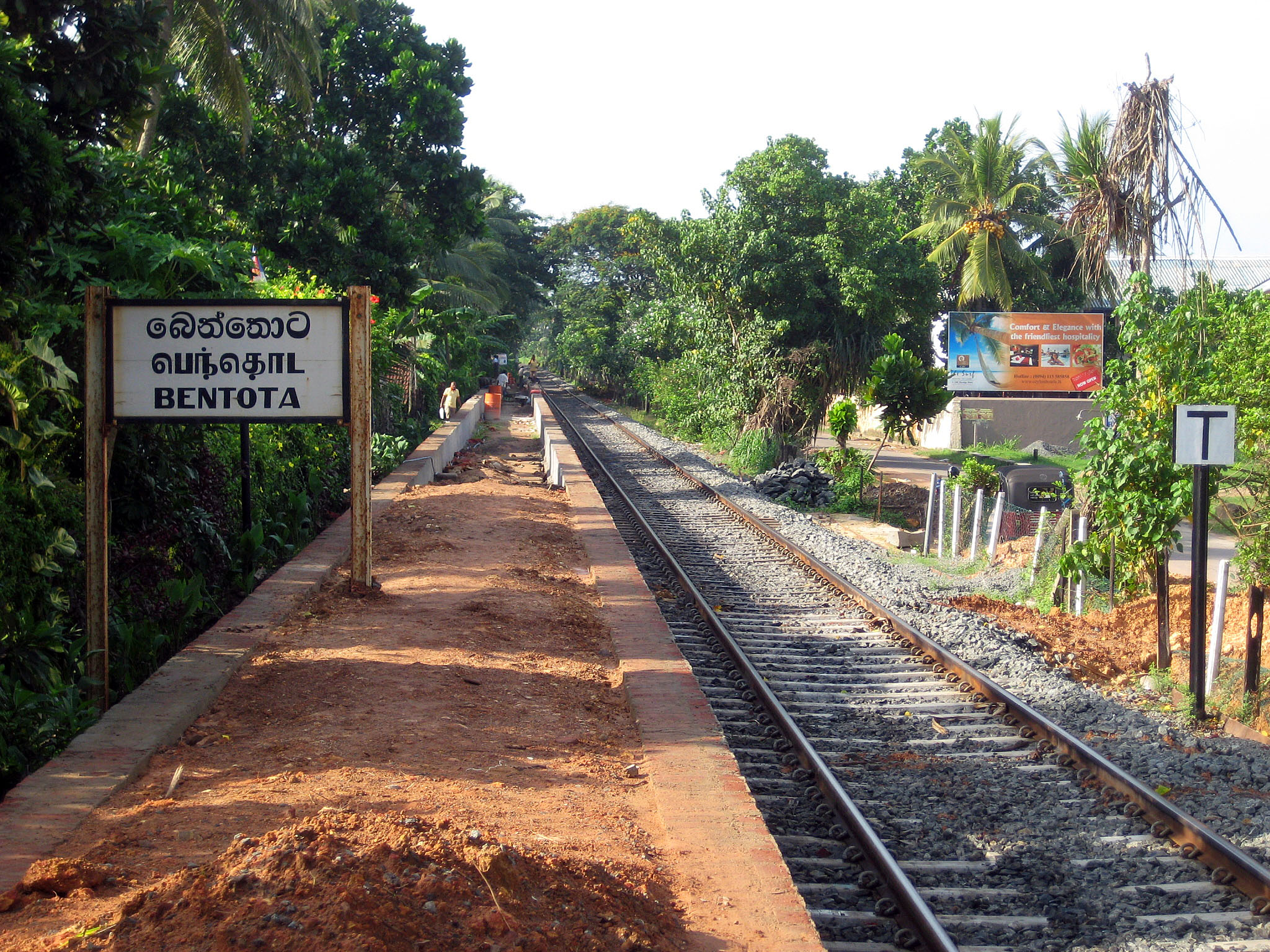
- The Bentota Railway Station, located south of the Bentota Bridge
- Coordinates: 06°25′37″N 79°59′53″E
- Crossed: Bentota River
- Locale: Border of Western Province and Southern Province (Aluthgama and Bentota)
- Other name: Bentara Palama
- Owner: Road Development Authority

Characteristics
- Material: Iron (Old Bridge), Concrete (New Bridge)

History
- Engineering design by: E. C. Davies
- Built: 1902 (Old Bridge); 2008 (New Bridge)
- Collapsed: 26 November 2025 (Section of the Old Bridge)
- Closed: 2008 (Old Bridge)

Location
- Interactive map of Bentota Bridge

The Bentota Bridge (locally known as Bentara Palama) refers to a series of parallel bridge structures that cross the Bentota River in Sri Lanka. Located on the Galle Road and the Coastal Railway Line, the bridge marks the border between the Western Province (Kalutara District) and the Southern Province (Galle District). The crossing consists of three bridges side-by-side: a modern multi-lane concrete road bridge, a railway bridge, and a historic 120-year-old iron bridge built during the British colonial era.

== History ==
In the 19th and early 20th centuries, as trade and transport between Colombo and the deep south increased, the need for a permanent crossing over the wide Bentota estuary became critical. Before the bridge's construction, travelers relied heavily on ferries and earlier rudimentary structures to cross the river.

=== Old Iron Bridge (1902) ===
The historic iron bridge was erected in 1902. A plaque on the structure identifies its creator as Edward Campbell Davies, an engineer from the colonial Government Factory. For over a century, this bridge served as the primary vehicular conduit on the Galle Road, connecting the southern coastline to the capital.

Due to continuous exposure to the saline coastal environment and decades of heavy traffic, the iron structure eventually suffered from severe corrosion and structural deterioration. Around 2008, after early signs of structural failure emerged, authorities restricted and eventually closed the old bridge to vehicular traffic, converting it to a pedestrian crossing and a popular tourist spot known for sunrise photography.

=== New Road Bridge ===
To accommodate the growing volume of traffic on the A2 highway and replace the failing iron structure, the Government of Sri Lanka initiated the construction of a modern concrete road bridge adjacent to the old one. The new bridge was opened rapidly during its final stages of construction as cracks and failures in the old bridge became increasingly hazardous.

=== Railway Bridge ===
A third structure runs parallel to the road bridges, carrying the Coastal Railway Line. This railway crossing was originally introduced by the British administration in the late 19th century to facilitate the rapid transport of coconut produce (such as copra and coconut oil) from the south to Colombo, and it continues to serve daily passenger and freight trains.

== 2025 Collapse ==
On the night of 26 November 2025, amidst extreme and prolonged adverse weather conditions across Sri Lanka due to Cyclone Ditwah, a large section of the 1902 old iron bridge suffered a catastrophic structural failure and collapsed into the Bentota River. Because the bridge had already been decommissioned for vehicular transport and cordoned off due to its fragile state, authorities reported no casualties or disruptions to the A2 highway traffic, which flowed unimpeded over the adjacent modern bridge. The collapse highlighted the extent of the historical structure's long-term decay.

== See also ==
- Bentota
- List of bridges in Sri Lanka
