= Mannar massacre =

Mannar massacre may refer to:

- Cankili I's massacre of Paravar Catholics on Mannar Island in 1544
- 1984 Mannar massacre, the killing of Tamils in Mannar town by the Sri Lankan Army
- Vankalai massacre, the killing of a family of 4 Tamils in Vankalai, Mannar district, in 2006
- Madhu school bus bombing, the killing of 17 people in Mannar town in 2008

== See also ==
- Mannar (disambiguation)
