= Pooneryn Fort =

Pooneryn fort
- Part of Kilinochchi District
- Pooneryn, Sri Lanka
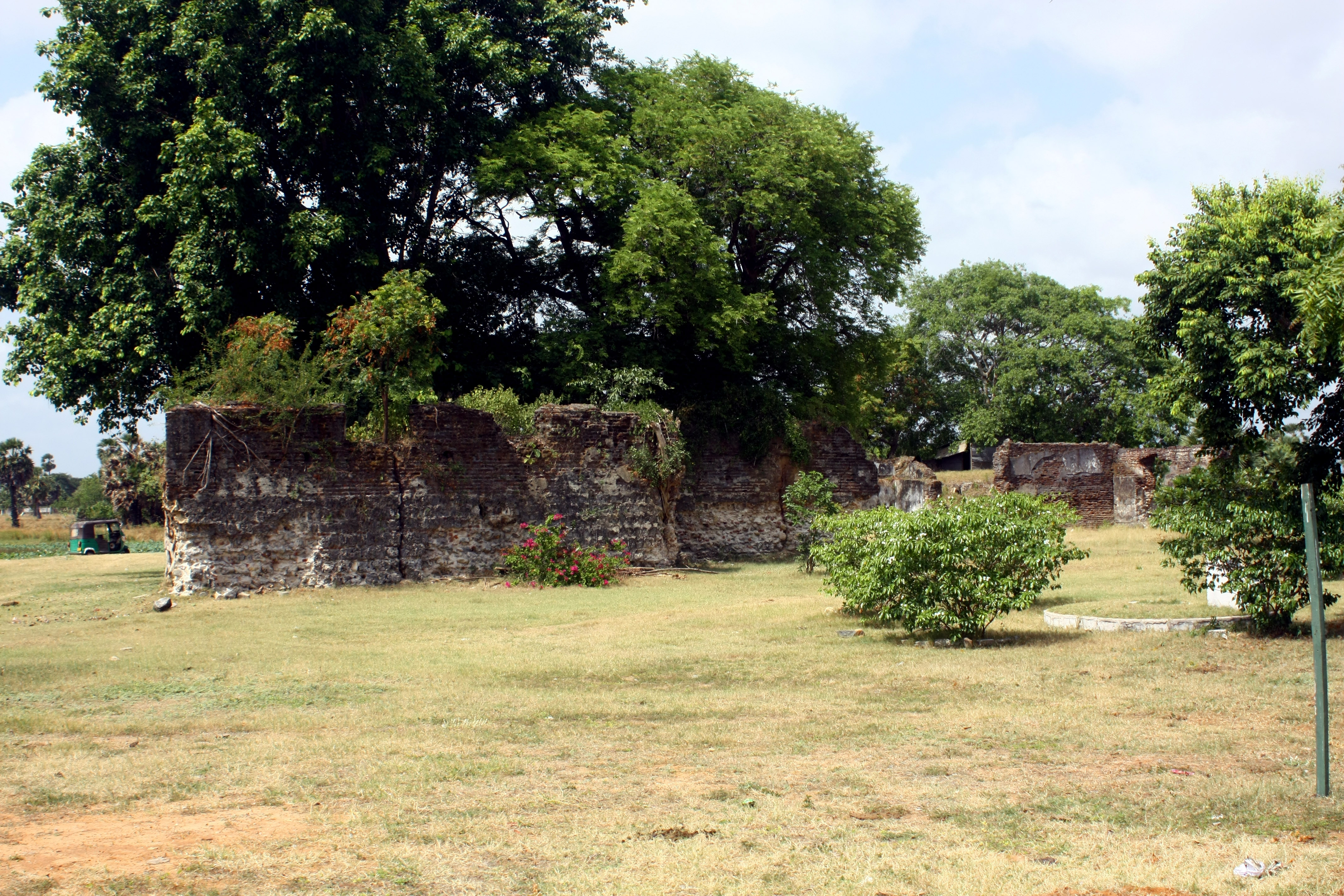
- Pooneryn fort

Site information
- Type: Defence fort
- Condition: Badly damaged

Location
- Location within Northern Province
- Coordinates: 9.503370°N 80.212141°E

Site history
- Built by: Portuguese and Dutch
- Materials: Granite Stones and bricks

Pooneryn Fort (Tamil: பூநகரிக் கோட்டை, romanized: Pūnakarik Kōṭṭai; Sinhala: පූනරීන් බලකොටුව Punarin Balakotuwa) is located in Pooneryn, adjacent to the Jaffna Peninsula. It was built by the Portuguese to protect their possessions in Jaffna. The fort was captured by the Dutch in 1658, and subsequently by the British in 1796.

During Dutch possession, the square-shaped fort had two bastions. In 1805, British built a rest house at the fort. The fort was under the control of Sri Lankan Army and LTTE during the civil war but is now fully accessible to the public. The remains of the fort however are currently in a poor state of repair.
