= A14 road (Sri Lanka) =

Road in Sri Lanka

Coordinates: 9.042637°N 79.863586°E

The A14 road is an A-Grade trunk road in Sri Lanka. It connects Medawachchiya with Talaimannar via Mannar.

The A14 passes through Mankulam, Cheddikulam, Paraiyanalankulam, Madu Road, Murunkan, Uyilankulam, Mannar and Pesalai to reach Talaimannar.
