= Kinniya Urban Council =

Kinniya Urban Council கிண்ணியா நகர சபை
- Council / Hon.Governor

Type
- Type: Local Authority

Leadership
- Special Commissioner: Mohamed Kareem Anees, Secretary since The Last Council was established in 2015 and dissolved in 19th March 2023.

Elections
- Last election: 2015 Sri Lankan local government elections

Website
- kinniyauc.gov.lk

Kinniya Urban Council (KUC) is the local authority for the town of Kinniya in eastern Sri Lanka. KUC is responsible for providing a variety of local public services including roads, sanitation, drains, housing, libraries, public parks and recreational facilities. It has 7 members elected using the open list proportional representation system.

== History ==
Kinniya Urban Council was created with effect from 15 April 2006 from parts of Kinniya Rural Council (Kinniya Pradesha Sabhai or Kinniya Pradeshiya Sabha).

== Services ==
Kinniya Urban Council providing following services to the public who reside in the area of Kinniya Urban Council limits Kinniya Rural Council (Kinniya Pradesha Sabhai or Kinniya Pradeshiya Sabha).

== Election results ==
=== 2006 local government election ===
Results of the local government election held on 30 March 2006:

Alliances and parties	Votes	%	Seats
United National Party / Sri Lanka Muslim Congress	6,061	39.33%	4
United People's Freedom Alliance (NUA, NC, SLFP et al.)	5,904	38.31%	2
Tamil National Alliance (ITAK, EPRLF (S), TELO, ACTC)	1,393	9.04%	1
Independent 3	1,310	8.50%	0
Independent 1	724	4.70%	0
Independent 2	19	0.12%	0
Valid Votes	15,411	100.00%	7
Rejected Votes	584		
Total Polled	15,995		
Registered Electors	20,704		
Turnout	77.26%		

The following candidates were elected: Ahamed Lebbe Seyyed Mohamed Buhary (UNP/SLMC); Hajju Mohamed Mohamed Faiz (UPFA); Thangarasa Idayarasa (TNA); Abdulla Mohamed Saalih Mohamed (UNP/SLMC); Mohamed Ameen Mohamed Mujeep (UNP/SLMC); Abdul Careem Abdul Nazar (UPFA); and Iyuoob Thuwan Sabreen (UNP/SLMC).

Abdulla Mohamed Saalih Mohamed (UNP/SLMC) and Mohamed Ameen Mohamed Mujeep (UNP/SLMC) were appointed Chairman and Deputy Chairman respectively.

The term of the council was due to expire in 2010 but on 22 December 2009 Minister of Local Government and Provincial Councils Janaka Bandara Tennakoon extended it until 31 March 2011.

=== 2011 local government election ===
Results of the local government election held on 17 March 2011:

Alliances and parties	Votes	%	Seats
United People's Freedom Alliance (SLMC, NC, ACMC, SLFP et al.)	6,876	46.50%	5
United National Party	3,727	25.21%	1
Independent 1	3,285	22.22%	1
Tamil National Alliance (ITAK, EPRLF (S), TELO, PLOTE, TULF, TNLA)	704	4.76%	0
Liberal Party of Sri Lanka	135	0.91%	0
Janatha Vimukthi Peramuna	41	0.28%	0
Independent 6	7	0.05%	0
Independent 2	4	0.03%	0
Independent 4	3	0.02%	0
Independent 7	3	0.02%	0
Independent 5	1	0.01%	0
Independent 3	0	0.00%	0
Independent 8	0	0.00%	0
Valid Votes	14,786	100.00%	7
Rejected Votes	436		
Total Polled	15,222		
Registered Electors	21,069		
Turnout	72.25%		

The following candidates were elected: Seyed Mohamed Buhary Mohamed Haaris; Mohamad Maharoof Hilmi (UPFA); Abdul Kuddus Muhammadu Fajal Kuddus; Mohamed Marsook Riswan Mohamed; Abdul Salam Muhammathu Nazeer; Mohamed Cassim Sabarulla (UPFA); and Iyoob Thuvan Safreen.

Mohamad Maharoof Hilmi (UPFA) and Mohamed Cassim Sabarulla (UPFA) were appointed Chairman and Deputy Chairman respectively.
