= Talaimannar =

Talaimannar தலைமன்னார் තලෙයිමන්නාරම
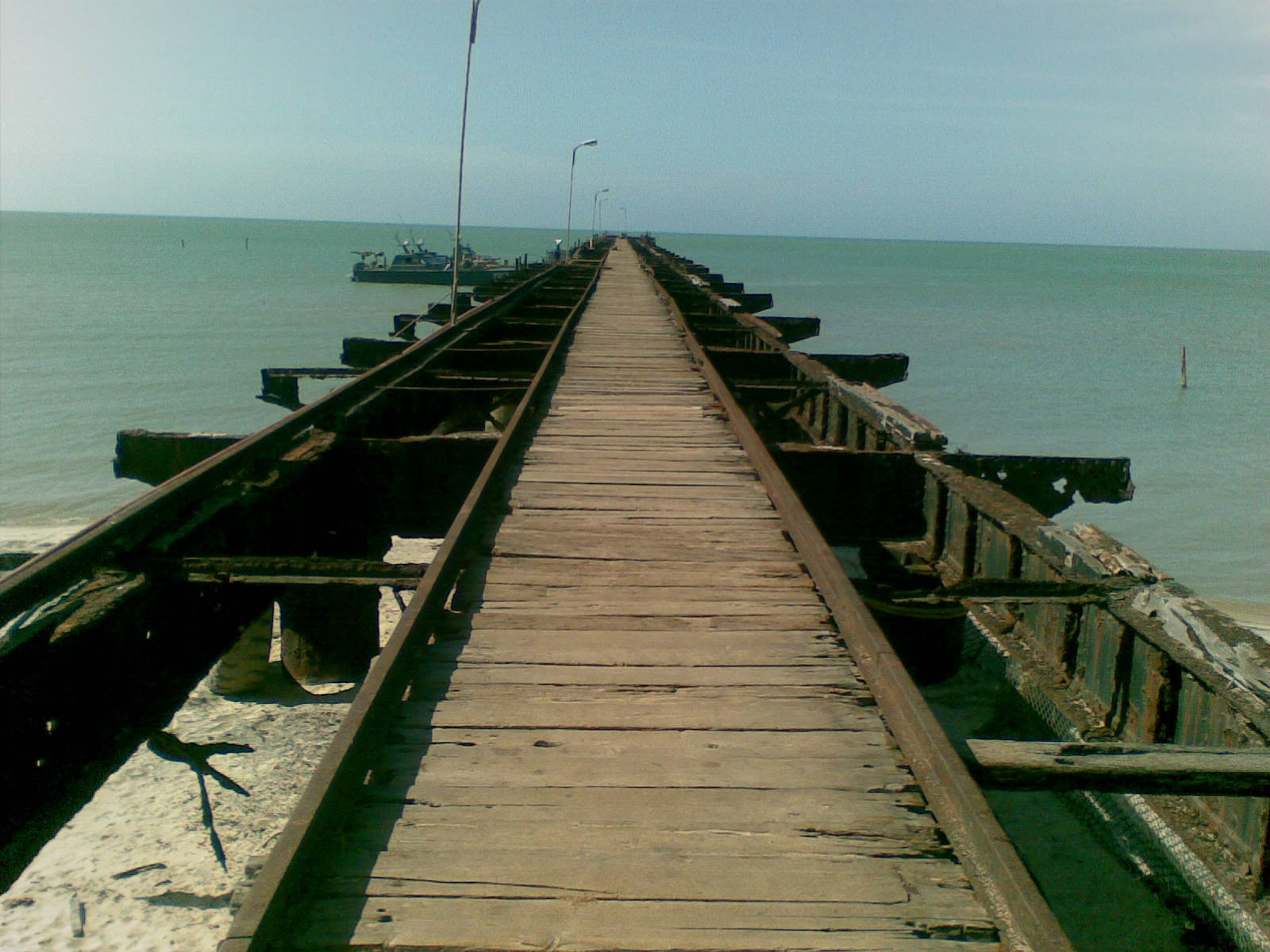
- Taliamannar pier

- Location within Northern Province
- Coordinates: 9°06′0″N 79°43′0″E
- Country: Sri Lanka
- Province: Northern
- District: Mannar
- DS Division: Mannar

Talaimannar (Tamil: தலைமன்னார்; Sinhala: තලෙයිමන්නාරම) is a settlement in Sri Lanka located on the northwestern coast of Mannar Island.

== Transport ==
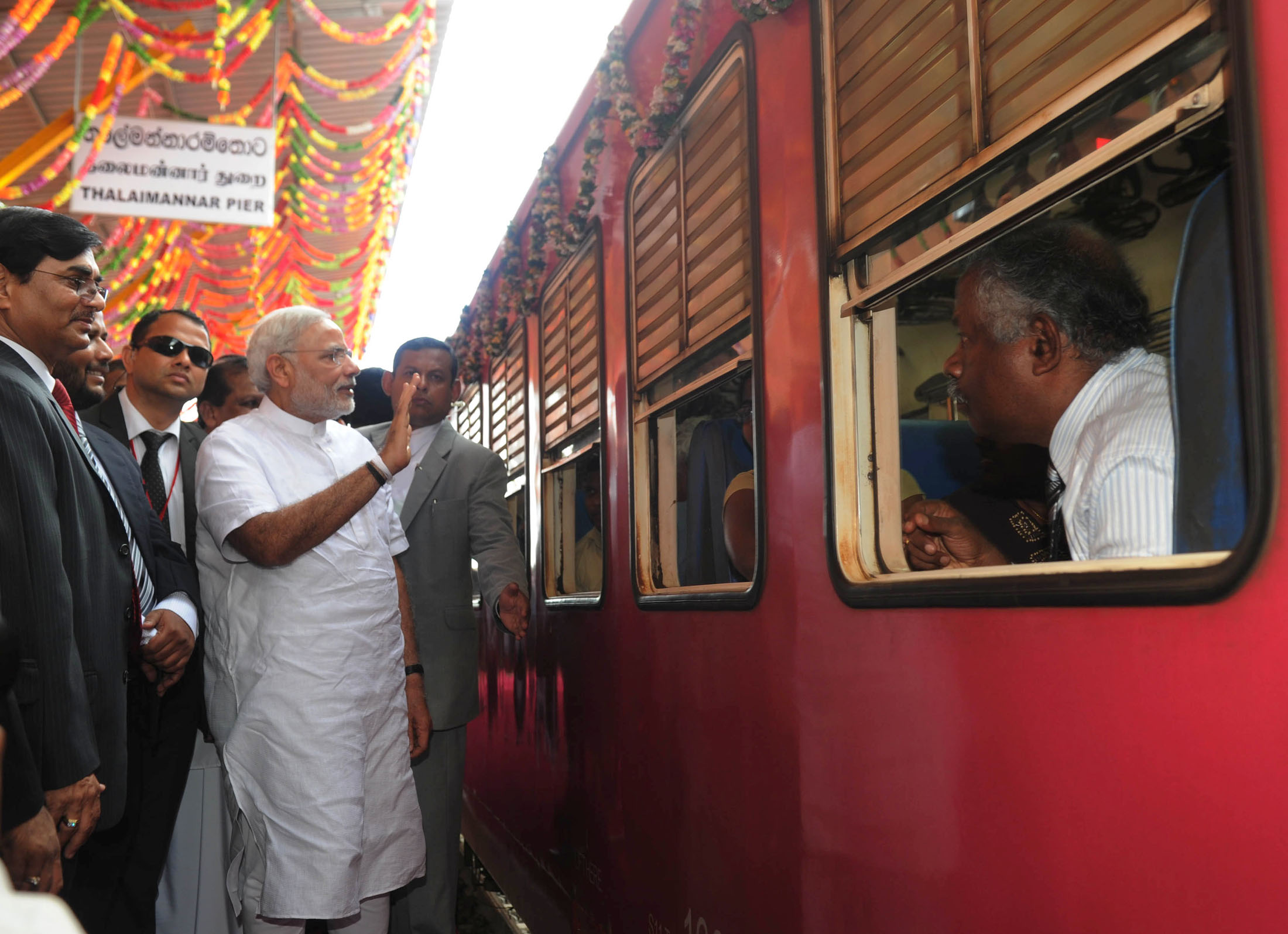
Indian Prime Minister Narendra Modi reopening the railway at Thalaimannar, c. 2015.

Sri Lanka's northern railway line was destroyed, disrupted or neglected during the 30-year Sri Lankan civil war, which ended in May 2009. The Mannar railway line, rebuilt by an Indian company, was reopened by Indian Prime Minister Narendra Modi in 2015. The pier is served by a station of the Sri Lanka Railways with railway terminus at Talaimannar which connects Talaimannar to rail network in Sri Lanka via Medawachchiya.

The town can be reached by a road from Mannar which links the island to the rest of highway network in Sri Lanka through a causeway, the A 14 road, carried by Mannar Bridge.

== Development ==
Being a windy location, Talaimannar is a kitesurf and kiteboard destination. The government proposed a wind farm but was opposed by the local community as the area is a bird sanctuary.

== See also ==
- Kachchatheevu
- Palk Strait bridge
- Railway stations in Sri Lanka
- Transport in Sri Lanka
