= A32 road (Sri Lanka) =

Road in Sri Lanka

Coordinates: 9.581798°N 80.200453°E

The A32 road is an A-Grade trunk road in Sri Lanka. It connects the towns of Mannar and Navatkuli, both of which are in Northern Province.

The A32 passes through Thirukethiswaram, Pallamadu, Illupaikadavai, Vellankulam, Pallavarayankattu, Chunnavil, Pooneryn and Arukuveli to reach Navatkuli.
