= 2011 Sri Lanka worker protests =

Series of worker protests against the Sri Lankan government in 2011

The 2011 Sri Lanka worker protests were a series of non-violent and later violent protests involving workers from the Free Trade Zones (FTZ) of Sri Lanka against the central government, which lasted for two weeks between 24 May and 6 June 2011. Approximately 250,000 workers took part in the protest against the Sri Lankan government's Private Sector Pension Bill (PSBP). The pension bill effectively cut wages and limited employee benefits, which had a negative effect on the FTZ workers and prompted the mass protest. The protests were the largest that the FTZ had seen since its establishment in 1978.

The protests started as non-violent demonstrations in the cities of Negombo and Katunayake, however, they quickly turned violent as the Sri Lanka Police struggled to contain the large crowds. On 30 May 2011, 21-year-old Roshen Chanaka was killed by police gunfire. Chanaka's death prompted widespread discontent with the Sri Lankan Police, and as a result, the Sri Lanka Army was deployed to deal with the situation.

The protests ended on 6 June with President Mahinda Rajapaksa announcing substantial amendments to the PSBP, which included a revised saving scheme for all FTZ workers.

== Background ==
In early May 2011, the Sri Lankan government was set to pass a Private Pension Bill that would break down fund contributions into three separate deposits; for employees, migrant workers and the self employed.

While this was the official description provided by the Sri Lankan government, the proposed scheme was in fact formulated around employees allocating a fixed percentage of their income to a membership fund, which would make up their pension. Once this reserved money had been depleted, the employees were longer entitled to any pension and may have even been forced back into the workforce as a result. This was the primary motivation for the subsequent protests, as the Sri Lankan workforce, particularly those working in the FTZ, were disenchanted and demanded a fairer scheme that would ensure that their retirement is secure. The proposed bill would effectively introduce compulsory saving for retiring FTZ workers, a notion that spearheaded the protests to follow.

Prathiba Mahanamahewa, a Sri Lankan Lawyer at the time, described the bill as unfair in an interview with AsiaNews; "But once they retire, and the money spent from the individual account is finished the person ceases to be a member of the fund, in short, they are no longer entitled to a pension. This is unacceptable, because everyone should be able to enjoy life after their retirement."

Both employers and employees expressed disdain for the proposed bill, which would decrease their base salaries by 2%. A female garment worker in the Katunayake FTZ stated during the protest; "They are going to give a pension to us only at the age of 60. The girls come to the FTZ to earn some money for their marriage dowry. After working about five years, they get their provident fund and the gratuity fund for that. We are not prepared to give that money to the government after shedding sweat for years".

== Protests ==
FTZ workers began non-violent demonstrations on 24 May 2011 in Negombo and Katunayake. Approximately 200,000 FTZ workers, mostly female garment workers, marched in the streets chanting and expressing their discontent with the government's new pension bill with a number of banners. The protestors tore down a large picture of President Mahinda Rajapaske at the Katunayake Junction. The protestors expressed their discontent with the Rajapaske government with a number of chants which included; "Ask the Great King [Rajapakse] to come here and answer these questions! Ask the labour minister to come and answer these questions!” "Whose force is this! The workers' force!”. While the protests were originally intended to be non-violent, as police attempted to contain the protests in the following days, the large crowds became increasingly more violent.

Outnumbered, the police were forced to physically separate the crowds, as they were disrupting traffic and other workers in the area. The police fired intimidation shots to disperse the large crowds, however, they were using live ammunition.

On 30 May, Roshen Chanaka, a 21-year-old FTZ worker, was shot by police on the streets of Katunayake. Chanaka's death sparked widespread outrage amongst the already disenchanted protestors as the level of violence at each protest began to increase dramatically. Police in the areas were now intent on breaking up the protests and were more willing to use violent dispersion tactics.

Retired Sri Lanka High Court judge Mahanama Tilakaratne was tasked with leading a commission into the events of Chanaka's death in 2017. Through his research he contended that the death of Chanaka could have easily been avoided through legitimate orders from Sri Lankan police hierarchy. Tilakaratne's findings also revealed that the police acted with extreme prejudice against the protesting FTZ workers, many of the police officers were using excessive force with weapons that included iron rods, chains and clubs. The police were also accused of beating women and children in the protests, as well as stealing personal items from the protestors. It was also concluded that over 800 police officers failed to wear their identification numbers on their uniforms during the protests.

Tilakaratne described the police's conduct as "deplorable'; "The report further states "In the circumstances, Police Officers acted contrary to the law, the superior officers were indifferent and failed to issue proper orders which enabled those of lower ranks to behave like thugs. Behaviour of the workers inside the Zone was such that Police in the circumstances acted in excess of the powers given to them by law, and deserve to be punished".

Following the death of Chanaka, the Sri Lanka Army were deployed by President Rajapaske to end the protests. The Sri Lanka Army were effective in their ability to diffuse the developing situation. The Army set up multiple physical deterrents including blockades and reinforced patrols which substantially decreased the influx of protestors into Negombo and Katunayake.

== Impact ==
Roshen Chanaka's death had a substantial impact on the subsequent events of the protests. The Sri Lankan government issued an apology regarding his death, and soon authorised for the Sri Lankan Army to replace the police force in dealing with the protestors. The Army were substantially more effective in dealing with the situation than the police, crowds were quick to disperse and compliant with the Army's directives. As a result, the protests came to an end on 6 June.

A public funeral service was held for Chanaka towards the end of the protests. The funeral was attended by approximately 5000 FTZ workers as well as Chanaka's family and friends. The parents of Chanaka were vocal about their discontent regarding the proposed private pension bill, and spoke about this in depth during the funeral. Towards the end of the service, the funeral had effectively become a non-violent protest of its own, with thousands chanting and rallying against the Rajapaske government. The Army was on alert at the funeral, and was able to quickly diffuse the protest.

The impacts of the protests also rippled into the Sri Lankan labour market and economy, with almost all FTZ's shut down during the two-weeks. 40,000 FTZ workers walked out of their factories following Chanaka's death, with many factories unable to fully recover from the mass walkout. It was estimated that the protests cost the Sri Lankan Economy more than 579 million Rupee (Approximately US$7.5 million).

The protests themselves shut down 70% of factories within Sri Lanka's Free Trade Zones and also blocked access to Bandaranaike International Airport for a period of five days.

== Aftermath ==
The protests led to an immediate response by the Sri Lankan government. On 9 June, the government elected to suspend the proposed bill and seek to reintroduce the legislation with new amendments and consultation with relevant trade unions that represent the FTZ in Sri Lanka.

A new bill was to be formulated in consultation with trade unions and leaders within Free Trade Zones. On 7 June, the Rajapaske government conducted a meeting with representatives from Free Trade Zones in Negombo and Katunayake as well as trade union officials to formulate a decision.

The Sri Lankan Government eventually passed a revised pension bill that included increased employee benefits in retirement, as well as removing the previous compulsory saving that was proposed. The amended bill also introduced a monthly instalment payment program for retiring FTZ workers. This method granted employees greater autonomy over their retirement funds.

The protests were a success for members of the Sri Lankan FTZ. Trade union officials were also pleased with the government's prompt action following the damaging protests. The salaries of those working in the FTZ became completely accessible. The revised pension bill has seen no further adjustments as of 2020.

=== Legacy ===
FTZ discontent still exists in parts of Sri Lanka today, and the Sri Lankan government still struggles to from a positive relationship with its FTZ workers. In 2018, workers at a glove factory in Katunayake, the same site of the 2011 protests, began protesting against FTZ unions for alleged labour abuses.

FTZ workers have cited this discontent with the government on multiple occasions, with disease and poor living conditions said to be two of the main issues that FTZ workers have faced in recent years.

In July 2016, approximately 3000 workers in Sri Lanka's FTZ protested against anti-union discrimination. A spokesperson from the protest stated: "Protesting workers demand that employers stop threats of physical attacks, recognize unions as collective bargaining agents, reinstate all employees dismissed for trade union activities, stop employing precarious workers with the intention to bust union activities, and punish the officials engaged in sexual harassment".

In January 2019, workers in the Sri Lankan FTZ protests against numerous cases of unfair dismissal. Workers were protesting against the oppression of trade unions as well as allegations of sexual assault and workplace misconduct within the FTZ.
