= Poonakary =

Pooneryn பூநகரி පූනෙරිය
- Village
- Location within Northern Province
- Coordinates: 9°30′0″N 80°12′0″E
- Country: Sri Lanka
- Province: Northern
- District: Kilinochchi
- DS Division: Poonakary

Poonakary or Pooneryn (Tamil: பூநகரி, romanized: Pūnakari; Sinhala: පූනෙරිය, romanized: Pūneriya), is a strategically important village situated on the Jaffna Lagoon, directly across from the Jaffna Peninsula in the Northern Province of Sri Lanka.

Situated in the Vanni region, the town was colonized by the Portuguese in the 15th century and a fort was constructed in the town due to its strategic location on the Jaffna Lagoon. It was later taken and expanded by the Dutch. According to 1770 records, it was square shaped with two bastions at opposite corners. The ramparts on each of the sides were about 30 metres in length. It was garrisoned until the late 18th century. The British built a rest house there in 1805.

Since 1983, and due to the Civil War, the town was garrisoned by the Sri Lankan Army. In 1993, the town was the site of a major battle during the civil war. During the battle, the LTTE attacked and failed to take the town. They did however managed to capture equipment such as assault rifles, ammunition, machine guns, mortars and even two T-55 tanks which proved to be vital to their forces. The town was later evacuated by the Sri Lankan Army due to tactical reasons in 1996. The LTTE occupied the town and maintained a garrison due to its strategic location. The fort was used during the Second Battle of Elephant Pass, where the LTTE bombed Elephant Pass from Poonakary and bombed soldiers who retreated to Jaffna. The town was recaptured by the Sri Lankan Army on November 15, 2008. The town has since then been garrisoned by the Sri Lankan Army. The government built a bridge across the lagoon nearby, called the Sangupiddy Bridge. The fort itself has been abandoned and left to the elements. The fort is accessible to the public.
