= Pesalai =

Pesalai பேசாலை පෙසාලය
- Village
- Location within Northern Province
- Coordinates: 9°05′0″N 79°50′0″E
- Country: Sri Lanka
- Province: Northern
- District: Mannar
- DS Division: Mannar

Pesalai (Tamil: பேசாலை) is a village in Mannar District, situated on the northern coast of Mannar Island, Sri Lanka. Most of the people in Pesalai are Roman Catholics, and there are also some Hindus and Muslims. Pesalai has 3 GN divisions: Pesalai North, Pesalai South, and Pesalai West. It has a population of about 8,000, 97% of which are Sri Lankan Tamils, and the remaining 3% are Moors. There are around 2,610 families and 7,350 people in Pesalai, including Kataspathri, Siruthoppu, and Murukankovil.

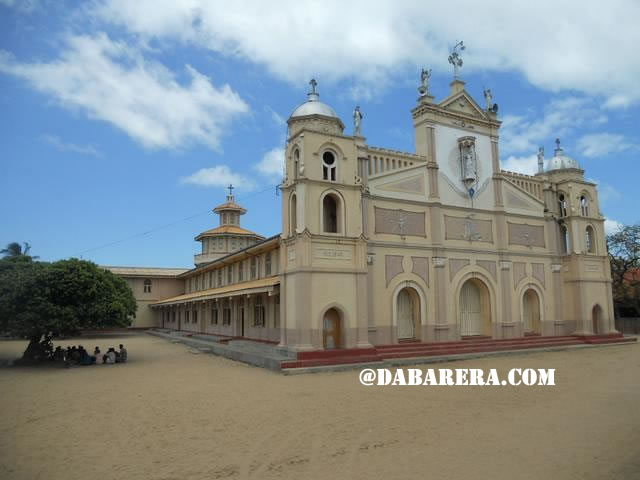
File:PESALAI_CHURCH.jpgPesalai Vettinayaki church- 2011

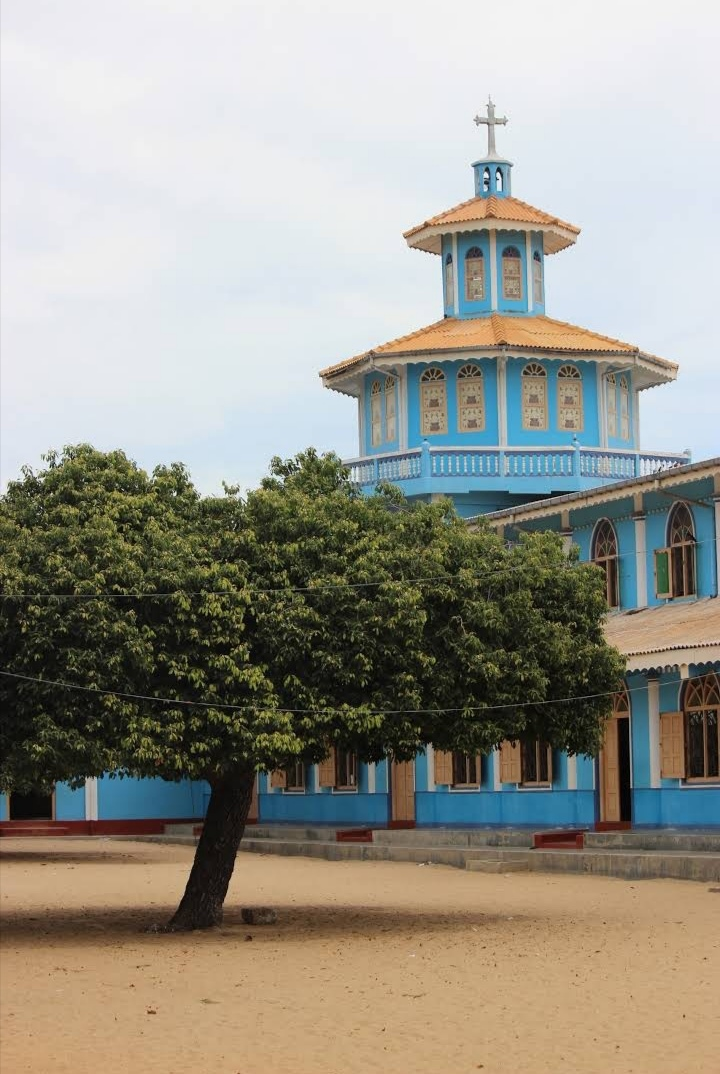

== See also ==
- Pesalai Church attack
