= Kinniya Bridge =

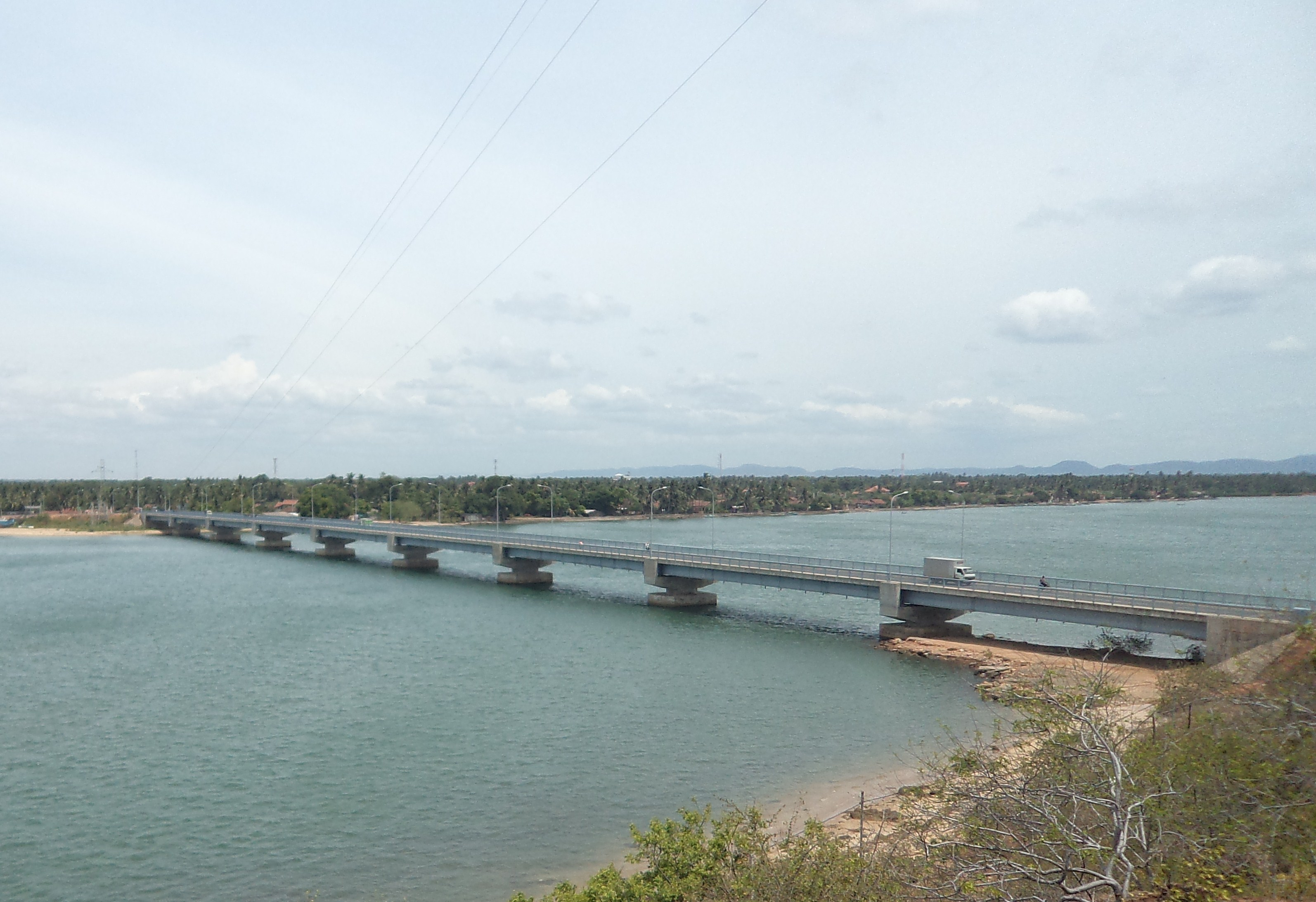
- Kinniya Bridge
- Coordinates: 8°30′25″N 81°11′28″E
- Carries: 2 lanes
- Crosses: Koddiyar bay on one side and Tambalagam bay on other side.
- Locale: Muttur and Kinniya

Characteristics
- Design: Cantilever bridge
- Total length: 396m
- Width: 10m

History
- Opened: 20 October 2009

Location
- Interactive map of Kinniya Bridge

Kinniya Bridge is the longest bridge in Sri Lanka with a length of 396 metres (1,299 ft). It crosses the lagoon area surrounded by Koddiyar Bay and Tambalagam Bay. It links Trincomalee with Kinniya, enabling civilians to cross the Kinniya lagoon to reach Kinniya and Muttur areas by the A15 highway. The bridge was completed and declared open on 20 October 2009 by President Mahinda Rajapaksa. Prior to that, the Manampitiya Bridge was Sri Lanka's longest bridge. The bridge was built with the financial assistance of the Saudi Arabian government.

== See also ==
- Manampitiya Bridge
- Irakkandi Bridge
