= Palk Strait Bridge =

Proposed bridge between Tamil Nadu, India, and Mannar Island, Sri Lanka

Palk Strait bridge and tunnel
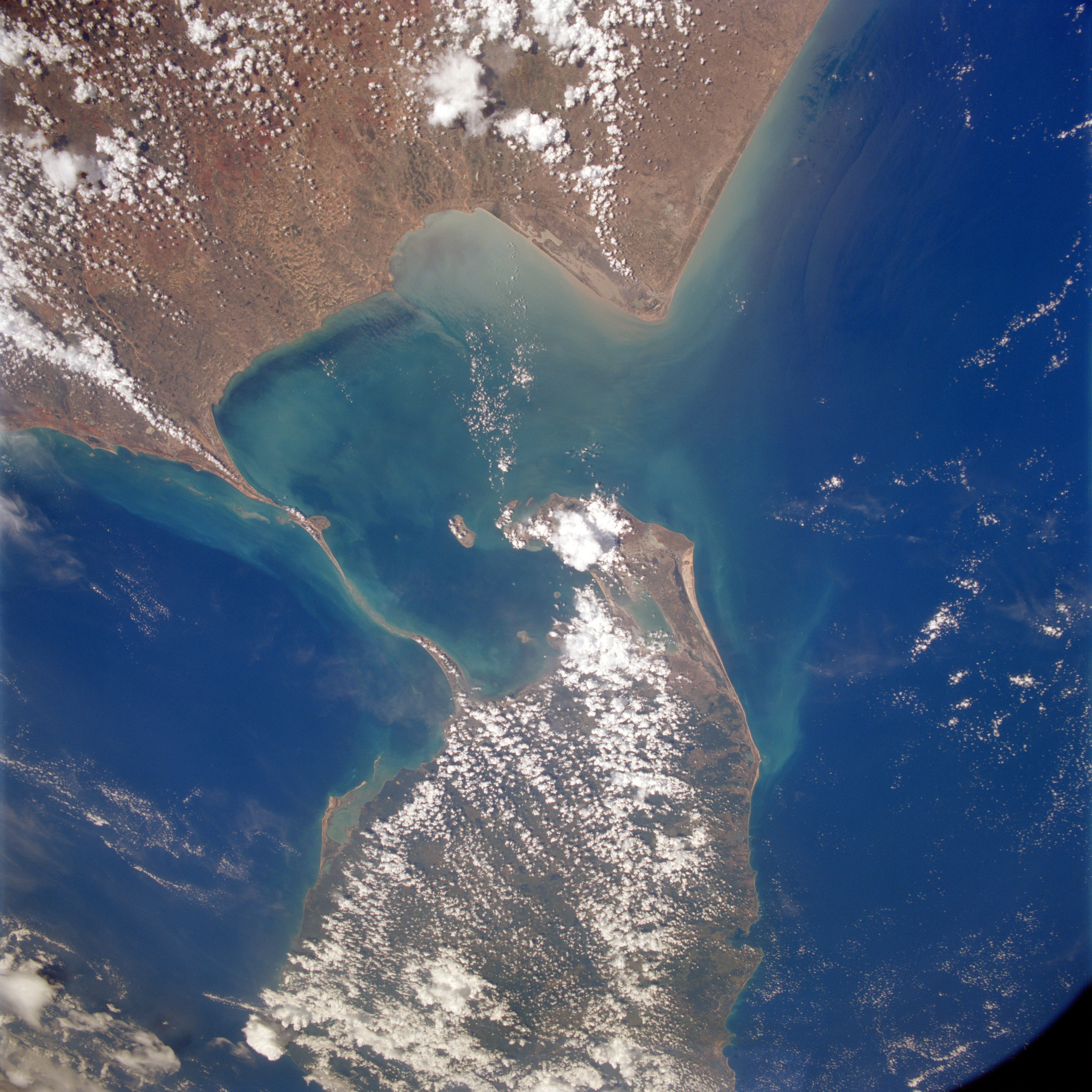
- The bridge and tunnel has been proposed across the Palk Strait, between India and Sri Lanka.
- Coordinates: 9°08′47″N 79°31′45″E
- Crosses: Palk Strait
- Official name: India-Sri Lanka Binational Bridge and Tunnel
- Owner: Government of India and Government of Sri Lanka

Characteristics
- Total length: 23 km (14 mi)

History
- Construction start: No details
- Construction end: No details

Location
- Interactive map of Palk Strait bridge and tunnel

The Palk Strait Bridge and Tunnel is a proposed 23-kilometre (14 mi) road and rail bridge and tunnel over the Palk Strait between Dhanushkodi in the Indian state of Tamil Nadu and Talaimannar on Mannar Island off the northwestern coast of Sri Lanka. The project was first formally introduced in 2002 during peace talks in Sri Lanka. It has since undergone multiple feasibility assessments, including recent bilateral agreements in 2023–24 to evaluate its technical and economic viability.

Despite support from sections of both governments and backing from the Asian Development Bank, the bridge has faced persistent opposition in Sri Lanka over concerns related to national sovereignty, immigration, and cultural integrity. Sri Lanka’s population is much smaller than that of India, and even smaller than the neighboring Indian state of Tamil Nadu. Sri Lankan policymakers and trade unions fear that a direct road and rail link would erase the country's natural maritime buffer. They worry that local markets could be overwhelmed by cheaper Indian goods and that a massive influx of unregulated Indian labor could displace Sri Lankan workers. Sri Lanka also relies on Chinese as well as Indian investment, so they worry that a bridge linking Sri Lanka to India could signal to China that they are integrating more closely into India’s geopolitical orbit. Environmentalists have also raised alarms about the fact that the proposed bridge would cross protected areas in both countries in the Gulf of Manmar.

== History ==
The bridge between India and Sri Lanka was first seriously proposed by the governments of these two countries back in 2002. During the 2002-2004 Peace Accord, the then Prime Minister, Ranil Wickremesinghe, asked India to help build what he called the ‘Hanuman Bridge’.

In June 2015, Nitin Gadkari, Minister of Road Transport and Highways of the Republic of India, submitted the proposal to the Asian Development Bank, which agreed to finance the construction. In December 2015, the Minister of Transport and Highways of Sri Lanka, Lakshman Kiriella dismissed the proposal. In spite of this setback, Gadkari continued promoting the bridge's construction, and insisting that discussions were ongoing, into 2016.

An initial feasibility study of the bridge-tunnel combination was done in 2018. The study says it would increase trade, tourism and employment. In 2023, a further study by Sri Lankan economists concluded that the bridge would reduce transport costs to the country by 50%, thereby reducing the cost of imported goods and services.

During a two day visit of Sri Lankan President Ranil Wickramasinghe to India in July 2023, both nations agreed to conduct a thorough feasibility study for a proposed bridge connecting India and Sri Lanka. That study was initiated by India in January 2024, and will evaluate technical, economic, and environmental aspects to determine the project's viability. The bridge aims to enhance trade, tourism, and overall connectivity between the two countries, and foster closer ties and cooperation. In July 2024, the then Sri Lankan President Ranil Wickremesinghe said that the feasibility study on the proposed bridge is in its final stages.

In 2025 President Anura Kumara Dissanayake stated that Sri Lanka was not ready for a land connection with India yet. India has continued to advocate for the project with the Indian High Commissioner to Sri Lanka calling the lack of a bridge between the two countries an anomaly.

== Opposition ==
There is some longstanding opposition to the project in Sri Lanka, with concerns around customs and immigration enforcement, tourism capacity, and the undermining of their independence. In 2015, Sri Lanka's Minister of Highways, Lakshman Kiriella, explicitly rejected the proposal, stating "We are against it because people of Sri Lanka are opposed to it. We cannot let India build a bridge". Sri Lankan nationalists worry that the bridge would facilitate illegal immigration from the neighboring Indian state of Tamil Nadu, as poor workers arrive in search of better-paying jobs. Some argue the bridge could erode Sri Lanka's ethnic and cultural distinctiveness, intensifying fears of demographic transformation and loss of identity.

== See also ==
- Asian Highway Network
- Borders of India
- India–Sri Lanka maritime boundary agreements
- Pamban Bridge
- Adam's Bridge
- Extreme points of Sri Lanka
- Intercontinental and transoceanic fixed links
