= Irakkandi Bridge =

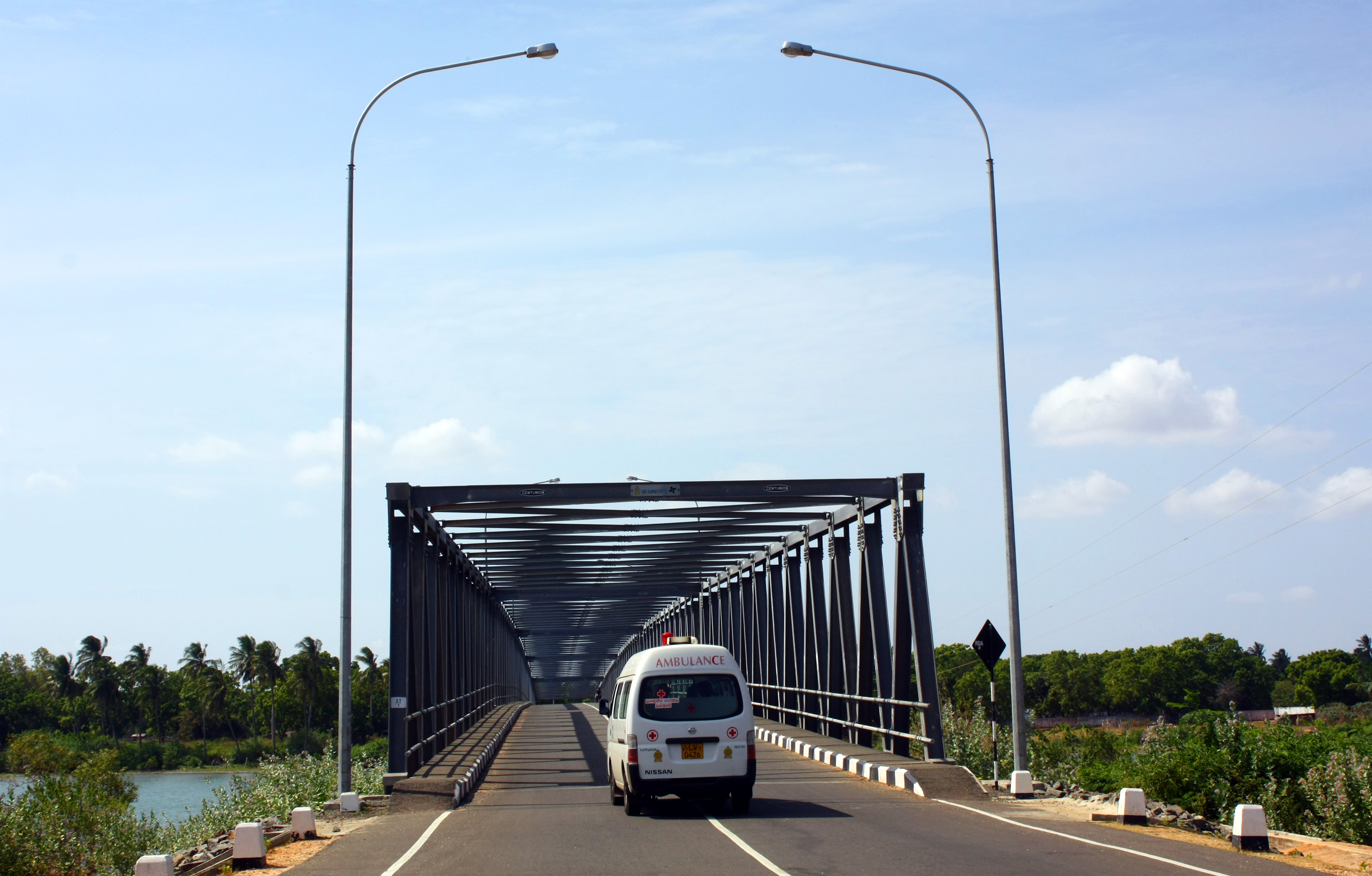
- Irakkandi_Bridge
- Coordinates: 8°43′42″N 81°10′17″E
- Carries: 2 lanes
- Locale: Pulmoddai

Characteristics
- Design: Cantilever bridge
- Total length: 300m
- Width: 7m

History
- Opened: 20 October 2009

Location
- Interactive map of Irakkandi Bridge

Irakkandi Bridge is the third longest bridge in Sri Lanka with a length of 300 m (980 ft). It spans the Irrakkandi Lagoon linking Trincomalee with Pulmoddai. The bridge was completed and declared open on 20 October 2009 by President Mahinda Rajapaksa, along with the Kinniya Bridge. It was built with the financial assistance of Saudi Arabian government.

== See also ==
- Kinniya Bridge
- Manampitiya Bridge
