= Medawachchiya =

Town in Sri Lanka

Coordinates: 8°33′12″N 80°27′30″E

Medawachchiya is a town in the Anuradhapura District, North Central Province of Sri Lanka. Situated 27 km from Anuradhapura, on the A9 Jaffna - Kandy main road, it is 229 km from Colombo. Medawachchiya is also the point from which the A14 main road to Mannar and Talaimannar starts. Medawachchiya is a significant railway junction on Sri Lanka Railways' northern network. Medawachchiya is the junction between the Northern Line and the Mannar Line.

Religion in Medawachchiya DS Division (2012)
1. Buddhist (92.9%)
2. Hindu (0.20%)
3. Muslim (6.20%)
4. Roman Catholic (0.50%)
5. Other Christian (0.20%)
6. Other (0.10%)

== History ==
The railway track on the Mannar Line was abandoned during the civil war due to terrorist activities of the Tamil Tigers which was active in the area from 1983 until May 2009 when the area was completely liberated by the Sri Lanka Army. Northern Line rail track around Medawachchiya survived the war, but were also destroyed further north. Following the end of the conflict, reconstruction of the lost railway network had begun.

== Local administration ==
Medawachchiya is the centre for Divisional Secretary of the government and other government and commercial institutions. The town is located on the main supply route to Northern Sri Lanka.

== Infrastructure ==
=== Road ===
Medawachchi is where the main crossroads of the Northern part of Sri Lanka meet. From Medawachchi, there are four main roads to four main towns in the country. North to Jaffna, south to Kandy, northwest to Mannar and northeast to Trincomalee. It is an administratively and commercially viable location. It also comes under the dry zone area of Sri Lanka.

=== Rail ===
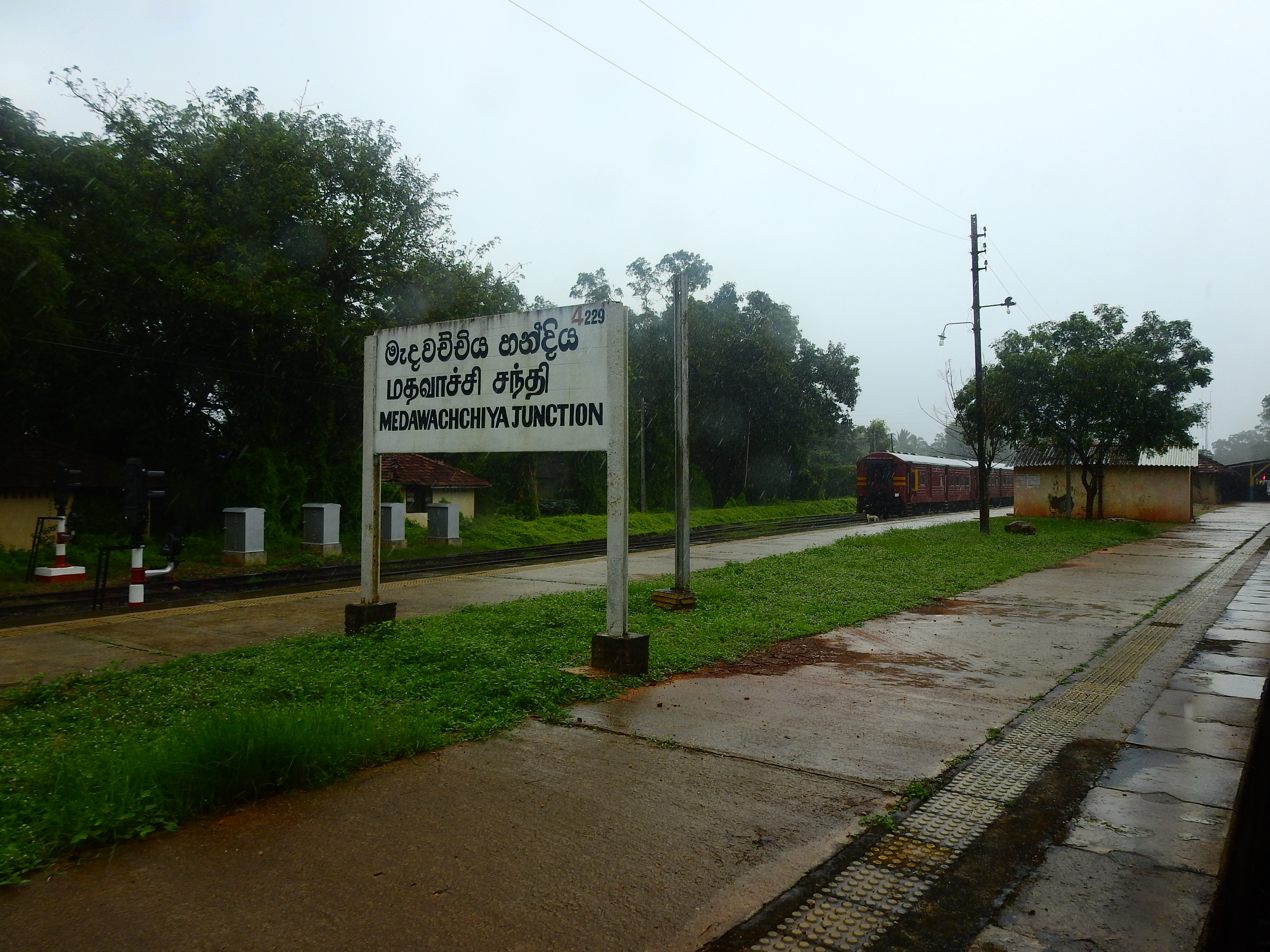
The railway station in December 2019.

Medawachchiya has a significant railway station and is an important railway junction along Sri Lanka Railways' northern network. Medawachchiya is the junction between the Northern Line and the Mannar Line, offering services to Colombo, Jaffna, Kankasanturai, and Talaimannar.

The Mannar Line (also known as Indo-Lanka railway) is partially closed due to war and reconstruction. The 43 km stretch between Medawachchiya and Madhu Road was reopened to passenger service on 14 May 2013, as the first phase of rebuilding the line. The first train marked the start of the long-awaited train services on the line. Sri Lanka's Economic Development Minister Basil Rajapaksa, Transport Minister Kumara Welgama, and Indian High Commissioner Ashok K Kantha were among the first passengers on the train that left from Anuradhapura to Madhu Road station in the Northern Province. Governor of Northern Province G A Chandrasiri, senior Minister Douglas Dayananda, General Manager, Sri Lanka Railways B A P Ariyaratne, and General Manager, IRCON S L Gupta were present at the ceremony.

This is the first phase of the USD 800 million, 252-km long Northern Railway project, including the Mannar Line, is being funded by the Government of India under its special Line of Credit. The line has been constructed on schedule by Ircon International, an Indian Railways undertaking. The Mannar Line will be extended up to the port of Mannar on the Western coast.

Medawachchiya there four main roads to Horopathana; roads go to 8 km Ralapanawa village in buduras viharaya temple.

== See also ==
- Railway stations in Sri Lanka
