= Manampitiya Bridge =

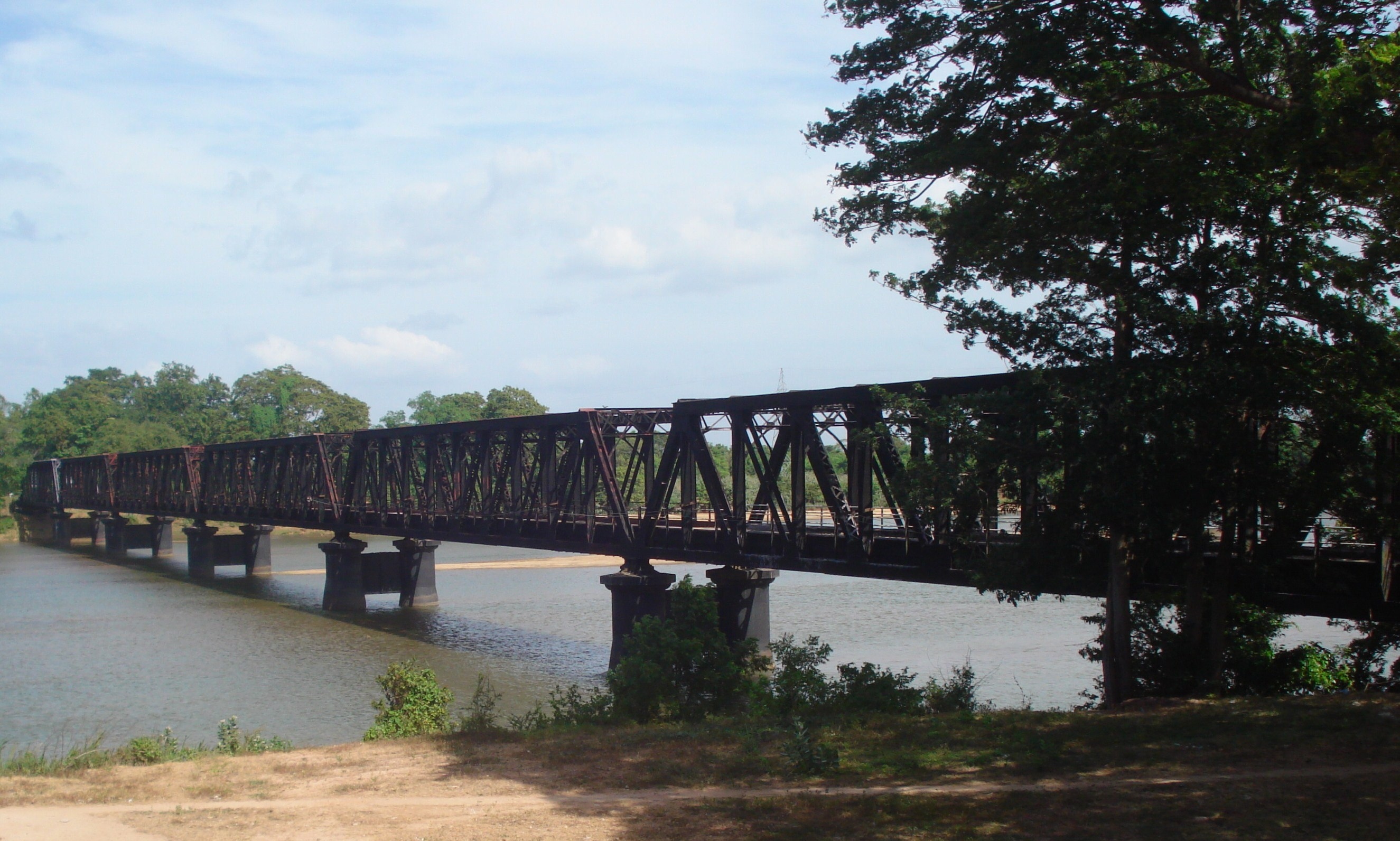
- Manampitiya old steel bridge
- Coordinates: 7°54′47″N 81°05′21″E
- Carries: 3 lanes (2 lanes of highway and 1 railway)
- Crosses: Mahaweli River
- Locale: Manampitiya, Polonnaruwa District
- Official name: Sri Lanka-Japan Friendship Peace Bridge

Characteristics
- Design: Cantilever bridge
- Total length: 302m
- Width: 10.4m

History
- Opened: 1922 (old bridge); 25 October 2007 (new bridge)

Manampitiya Bridge is the second longest bridge in Sri Lanka with a length of 302 m (991 ft). It comprises two bridges, an early-twentieth-century steel bridge which is used for railway and a newly built bridge carrying two lanes of highway. Before the Kinniya Bridge was declared open in 2009, it was the longest bridge in Sri Lanka. The steel bridge was built in 1922, during the colonial rule. It is 291 m (955 ft) long and less than 5 m (16 ft) in width. The bridge is located 81 km (50 mi) east of Maradankadawala, along the A11 Habarana-Thirikondiyadimadu road in Polonnaruwa District, linking North Central Province with Eastern Province over Mahaweli River. The new bridge in Manampitiya was built with financial assistance of Japan, hence the name Sri Lanka-Japan Friendship Peace Bridge. Japan International Cooperation Agency (JICA) provided LKR 1.3 billion on behalf of the Japanese government. Bridge was declared open on 25 October 2007 by President Mahinda Rajapaksa. The new 50 Sri Lankan Rupee note depicts the Manampitiya Bridge.

== See also ==
- Kinniya Bridge
- Irakkandi Bridge
