= Verugal Aru =

Coordinates: 8°16′N 81°24′E

Verugal Aru Verugal River
- Etymology: Perukkal meaning "flood" or "that which overflows", in Tamil.

Location
- Country: Sri Lanka

Physical characteristics
- Source
  - location: Eastern Province
- Mouth: Bay of Bengal
  - location: Trincomalee

Verugal Aru (Tamil: வெருகல் ஆறு Verukal Āṟu; lit. '"flood" or "that which overflows"'), also known as the Verugal River, is a river in Sri Lanka that separates the Trincomalee and Batticaloa districts. The famous Verugal Kandaswamy Temple lies on its banks. It flows through Verugal town, just north of Kathiraveli. The river reaches the Indian Ocean on the eastern coast of the island just south of Trincomalee. The river also feeds the Ullackalie Lagoon.

Known as the Barraces to Alexandrian seafarers, it features on Ptolemy's map of the island in the 2nd century CE. Its source on the map is the Central Highlands of the island, described as Malea from the Tamil Malai meaning hills/mountains. Mahavali Ganga River (from Ma-Vali - the great pathway) which flows from the highlands is the source of the Verugal River.

A famous annual pilgrimage takes place from the Koneswaram temple to the Verugal Murugan temple on the banks of the river carrying the Hindu deity Murugan's Vel.

== See also ==
- List of rivers of Sri Lanka
