= Kinniya =

Kinniya: கிண்ணியா; කින්නියා
- Town
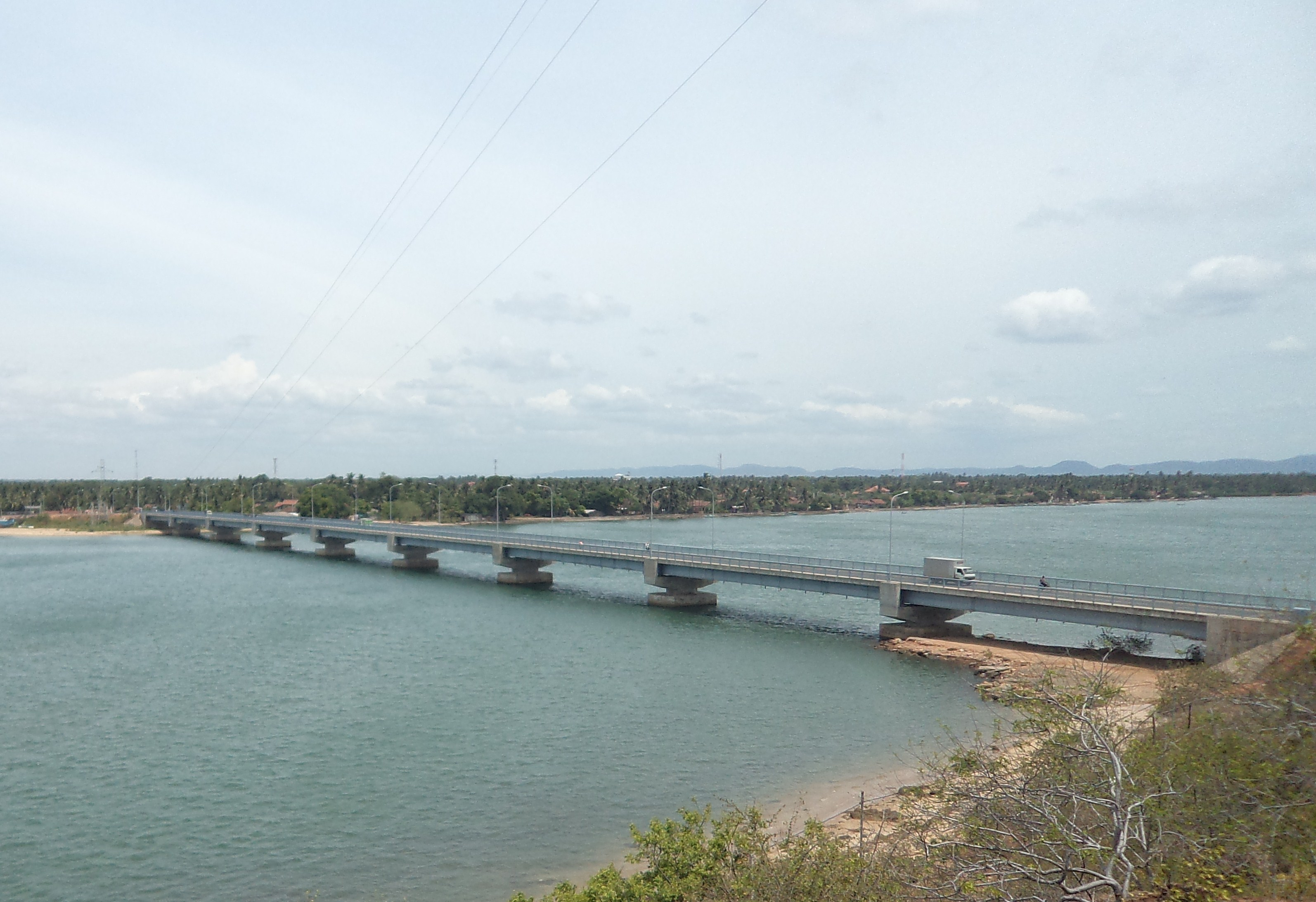
- Kinniya Bridge, Trincomalee District

- Location within Sri Lanka
- Coordinates: 8°29′0″N 81°11′0″E
- Country: Sri Lanka
- Province: Eastern
- District: Trincomalee
- DS Division: Kinniya Divisional Secretariat

Government
  - Type: Kinniya Urban Council
  - Special Commissioner: Secretary (UPFA)

Population (2007)
  - Town: 61,558
  - Urban: 35,645

Kinniya (Tamil: கிண்ணியா, romanised: Kiṇṇiyā; Sinhala: කින්නියා, romanised: Kinniyā) is a town on the east coast of Sri Lanka, in the Trincomalee District of the Eastern Province. It is about 20 km (12 mi) from the city of Trincomalee and 240 km (150 mi) from Colombo. Located in Sri Lanka's dry zone, the Kinniya region often experiences hot and dry weather with very little precipitation. Kinniya Bridge is Sri Lanka's longest bridge, which attracts many tourists to the town. Being adjacent to the Trincomalee Harbour, Kinniya was devastated by the 2004 Indian Ocean tsunami.

== History ==
Kinniya has over 500 years of history. A 400-year-old Grand Masjid in Kinniya was demolished and a new one built in its place in 2002 by the Saudi Arabian government. The name "Kinniya" denotes the kinni tree, which was part of the identity of the people of Kinniya.

== Demographics ==
Kinniya has a Moorish majority. There are small minorities of other ethnic groups, such as Sri Lankan Tamils and Sinhalese.

Ethnicity in Kinniya (2012)
Population	Percent
Sri Lankan Moors	96.1%
Sri Lankan Tamils	4.6%
Sinhalese	0.4%
Others	0.5%

Ethnicity identification in Kinniya Urban Council area
Ethnicity	Population	% Of Total
Sri Lankan Moors	61,869	96.01
Sri Lankan Tamils	2,390	4.06
Sinhalese	245	0.40
Other (including Burgher, Malay)	32	0.03
Total	75,674	100

Source: statistics.gov.lk.

Religion in Kinniya (2012)
Population	Percent
Islam	95.8%
Hindu	3.8%
Buddhist	0.39%
Christian	0.06%

Religious Identification in Kinniya Urban Council area
	2012	Percentage
Islam	61,880	95.77%
Hindu	2,439	3.77%
Buddhist	253	0.39%
Catholic	39	0.06%
Other	2	0.003%
Total	64,613	100.0%

Source: Statistics.gov.lk.

== Economy ==
The fishing industry plays a key role in both the economy and society of Kinniya.

== Education ==
Kinniya has well-educated groups from many sectors, including medicine, law, engineering, academic staff, and the public sector. Many schools, both private and public, have been established in the town. Higher education centres have also been established, as during the Sri Lankan Civil War, it was difficult to travel to established higher education institutions elsewhere.

- Kinniya Al Aqsa National School (National School)
- Kinniya Central College. (National School)
- Kinniya Muslim Girls Maha Vid (National School).
- Aligar Maha Vidyalayam.
- TB Jaya Vidyalaya
- Abdul Majeed Vidyalaya

== See also ==
- Kinniya Urban Council
- Nilaveli
- Thiriyai
