= Verugal =

Coordinates: 8°15′N 81°22′E

Verugal is a small hamlet situated within the eastern Trincomalee District of Sri Lanka. It is known for its Hindu temple dedicated to deity Murugan that was destroyed in the 16th century by the Portuguese and rebuilt later.
