= Mannar line =

Railway line in Sri Lanka

Overview
- Status: Open
- Owner: Sri Lanka Railways
- Termini: Medawachchiya Junction; Talaimannar
- Stations: 11

Service
- Type: Regional rail
- System: Sri Lanka Railways
- Operator: Sri Lanka Railways

History
- Opened: 1914
- Reopened: Medawachchiya Junction to Madu On 14 May 2013; Up to Talaimannar in April 2015

Technical
- Line length: 106 km (66 mi)
- Number of tracks: 1
- Track gauge: 1,676 mm (5 ft 6 in)
- Electrification: No
- Operating speed: 120 km/h (75 mph)

The Mannar line is a railway line in Sri Lanka. Branching off the northern line at Medawachchiya Junction, the line heads north-west through North Central and Northern provinces before terminating at the town of Talaimannar. The line is 106 kilometres (66 mi) long and has 11 stations. The line opened in 1914.

== History ==
=== International goal ===
The Mannar line was built as part of a plan to create a rail link between Sri Lanka and India. A 22-mile bridge to link the two countries had been proposed as early as 1894, by the Consultant Engineer for railways in Madras (now Chennai). The proposal was given serious consideration and a technical blueprint and cost analysis was conducted. By 1914, the Mannar line was built to connect Talaimannar on Mannar Island to the Sri Lankan mainland. On the Indian side, the Indian railway network was extended to Dhanushkodi. The international bridge to link the two was not built.

=== Operation ===
During the Mannar line's operation, trains connected Mannar and Talaimannar with cities along the northern line, such as Anuradhapura and Kurunegala, eventually reaching Colombo. The Boat Mail was a major service on the line, allowing passengers to board a ferry to Dhanushkodi in India. Passengers could use the Boat Mail service to travel between Colombo and Madras.

The ferry service to connect the railheads at Talaimannar and Dhanushkodi lasted until the 1960s, when a cyclone destroyed the pier and rail line at Dhanushkodi. The Mannar line was not affected. The ferry service resumed with a new Indian terminus at Rameshwaram.

=== War and revival ===
All services on the line were stopped in June 1990 due to the civil war. The tracks, stations and other infrastructure on the line were subsequently destroyed during the war.

In the 2000s, the rail bridge to connect the two countries was proposed again, highlighting the benefits of connecting the ports of Colombo and Trincomalee with Chennai.

Following the end of the civil war in May 2009, the government initiated various projects to rebuild the entire line. The contract to reconstruct the 44 kilometres (27 mi) line between Medawachchiya Junction and Madhu was awarded to Ircon International, the Indian state-owned engineering and construction company. The project will cost US$ 81 million and would be financed by a soft loan from the Indian government. The same company was also awarded the contract to reconstruct the 65 kilometres (40 mi) line between Madhu and Talaimannar, costing US$ 150 million and to be financed by a soft loan from the Indian government.

The section of the line between Medawachchiya and Madhu Road reopened on 14 May 2013, following its reconstruction. The reconstruction of the entire line was completed in 2015.

=== Completion and reopening ===
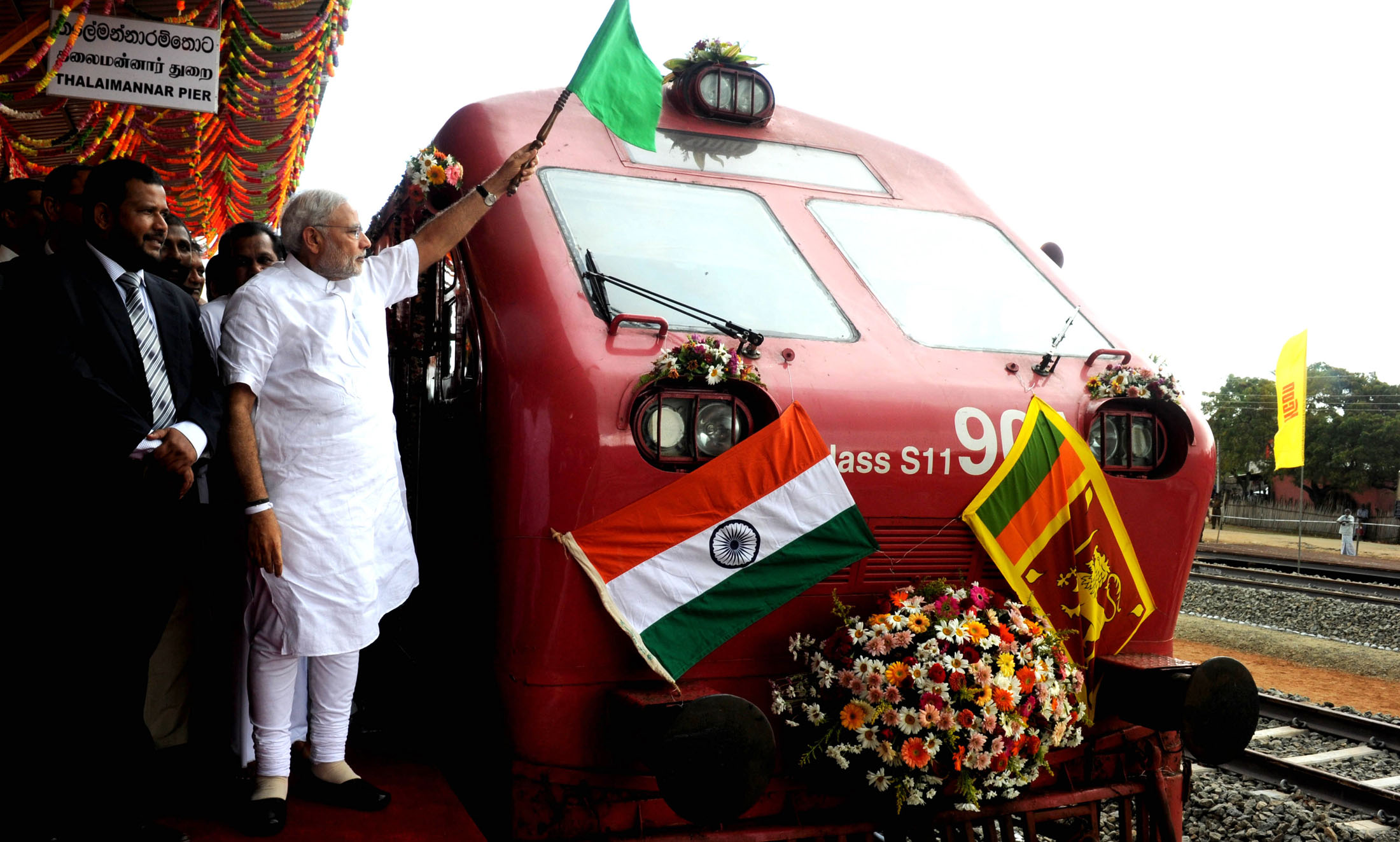
Reopening in Thalaimannar Pier

The entire line was completed up to Talaimannar on 2015. The Indian Railway Construction Company Limited (IRCON) carried out the construction work of both stages of the project which was financed under a US$425 million credit facility from India. The opening of the reconstructed line was attended by Sri Lankan President Maithripala Sirisena and ministers Lakshman Kiriella and Rishad Bathiudeen. The reconstructed line was commissioned by Indian Prime Minister Narendra Modi on March 14, 2015.

== Services ==
Railbus services operate from Medawachchiya Junction to Madhu Road, while daily trains operate between Madhu Road and Colombo Fort.

Four train services operate between Colombo Fort and the Talaimannar Pier daily.

== Infrastructure ==
The Mannar line is entirely single track, at 5 ft 6 in (1,676 mm) broad gauge, both before the war and after reconstruction. The line was not electrified and the current reconstruction project will not include electrification.
