= Mannar Island =

Mannar Island மன்னார் (Tamil) මන්නාරම (Sinhala) Manar Island
- Island
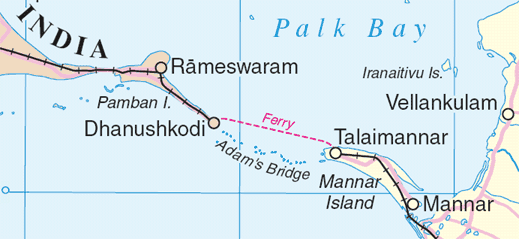
- Mannar Island and adjacent Adam's Bridge

- Location within Northern Province Location within Sri Lanka
- Coordinates: 9°03′0″N 79°50′0″E
- Country: Sri Lanka
- Province: Northern
- District: Mannar
- DS Division: Mannar

Area
  - Total: 130 km^{2} (50 sq mi)

Population
  - Total: 66,807

Mannar Island (/məˈnɑːr/ mə-NAR; Tamil: மன்னார் தீவு, romanized: Maṉṉār tīvu; Sinhala: මන්නාරම් දූපත, romanized: Mannāram dūpata), formerly spelt Manar Island, which lies off the north-western coast of Sri Lanka, is part of Mannar District, Sri Lanka. It is linked to the main island of Sri Lanka by a causeway and the Mannar Bridge, which carries the A14 highway, and a railway bridge. It has an area of about 130 square kilometres (50 sq mi), mainly covered with vegetation and sand.

== Etymology ==
In the Tamil language Mannar means the raised place [of sand] which is thought to have come from the geology of the island which was formed by the accumulation of sand.

== History ==
Scholars identify the old Sinhalese name "Mahapatan-ju", mentioned in Sigiri graffiti, as the island of Mannar.

During the Sri Lankan civil war (1983–2009), Muslim inhabitants of the island were forced to leave by the Tamil Tigers, but some have returned since.

== Geography ==
The island lies at the eastern end of Adam's Bridge (Tamil: ஆதம் பாலம், romanized: Ātam pālam), a chain of limestone shoals between Pamban Island (also known as Rameswaram Island), off the south-eastern coast of Tamil Nadu, India, and Mannar Island. Geological evidence suggests that this may have been a land connection between India and Sri Lanka.

Fishing is an important part of the economy.

== Energy ==
The largest wind farm in Sri Lanka currently comes from Mannar island, from the 100 MW Wind Power Plant of Ceylon Electricity Board. This plant connects to the national grid by a 220 kV Inter-connector Grid Substation at Nadukuda. GSS has the provision to connect another 200 MW and the island has more capacity if required in the future. Substation construction and installation is done by Minel Lanka under the main contract by Siemens, India.

== Settlements and transport ==
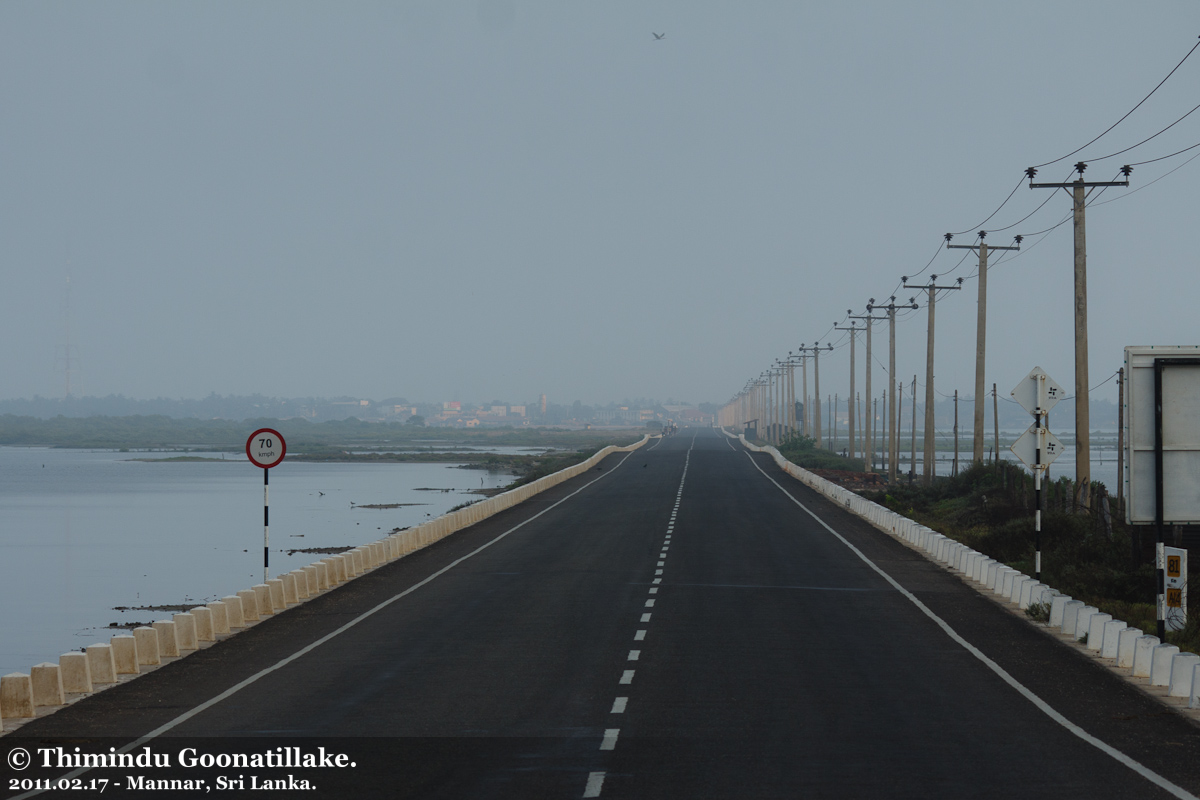
Mannar Causeway

The main settlements on the island are Mannar and Erukkulampiddi on its eastern coast, and Pesalai on its northern coast, all connected by the A14 road which leads across a bridge to mainland Sri Lanka.

Talaimannar, on the north-western coast of the island, is the terminus for the Mannar railway line.

Between 1914 and 1964, there was a train and ferry link from mainland India via Dhanushkodi and Talaimannar to Colombo, but this was not resumed after the disastrous damage caused by a cyclone in 1964. The Palk Strait bridge was proposed in June 2015, to link mainland India to Mannar.

== Environment ==
The island is home to baobab trees, brought from Africa by Arab merchants centuries ago. The island is within the Central Asian Flyway, a heavily used route for migratory birds that crosses 30 countries from Siberia to the Indian Ocean, and the Vankalai Bird Sanctuary is just south of the island on the mainland. It is protected by the Sri Lankan Government and is recognised under the Ramsar Convention on Wetlands of International Importance Especially as Waterfowl Habitat as an important area for both local and migratory birds.

The island's ecology, agriculture and fishing areas may be easily damaged by disruption to the environment.

== Sand mining ==
The mineral ilmenite, from which titanium dioxide is made, is plentiful in the island's sand. Titanium dioxide is a white pigment with a variety of uses, including in paint, plastics and cosmetics. The Perth-based Australian company, Titanium Sands, has been doing exploratory drilling and has estimated reserves of up to 265 million tonnes of ilmenite and have started the process of applying for a permit to mine the sand. However, environmental scientists are concerned about the impact of future drilling on birds and other wildlife. The company has said that an environmental impact assessment, followed by public consultation, would be undertaken before a mining licence can be granted.

== See also ==
- Portuguese invasion of Jaffna kingdom (1560)
