= A15 road (Sri Lanka) =

Road in Sri Lanka

Coordinates: 8.089885°N 81.445424°E

Route number sign for A15 ("A" Class) highway in Sri Lanka

The A 15 road is an A-Grade trunk road in Sri Lanka. It connects Batticalao with Trincomallee via Tirikkondiadimadu.

The A 15 passes through Eravur, Morakottanchenai, Valaichenai, Mankerny, Vaharai, Verugal, Serunuwara, Palaithoppur, Muttur, Kinniya and Ganeshapuram to reach Trincomallee.
