= Mannar, Sri Lanka =

Mannar மன்னார் මන්නාරම
- Town
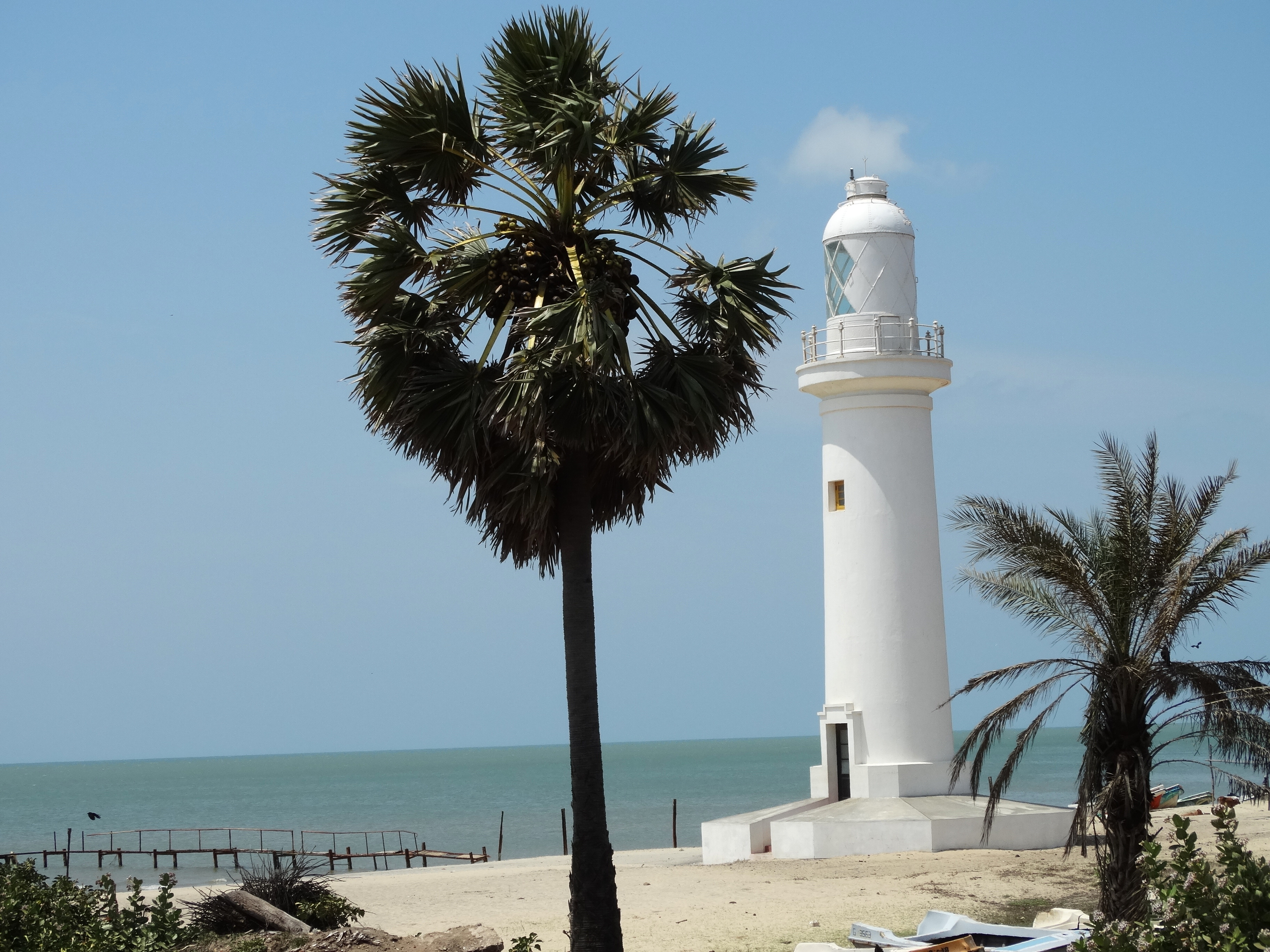
- Mannar lighthouse

- Location within Northern Province Location within Sri Lanka
- Coordinates: 8°58′0″N 79°53′0″E
- Country: Sri Lanka
- Province: Northern
- District: Mannar
- DS Division: Mannar

Government
  - Type: Urban Council
  - Chairman: N/A

Population (2011)
  - Total: 35,817
  - Density: 308/km^{2} (797/sq mi)
- Time zone: UTC+5:30 (Sri Lanka Standard Time Zone)

Mannar (Tamil: மன்னார், romanized: Maṉṉār, IPA: [mɐnːaːɾ]; Sinhala: මන්නාරම, romanized: Mannārama, IPA: [mənːaːrəmə]), formerly spelled Manar, is the main town of Mannar District, Northern Province, Sri Lanka. It is governed by an Urban Council. The town is located on Mannar Island overlooking the Gulf of Mannar and is home to the historic Ketheeswaram temple. In the Tamil language, Mannar means 'raised place [of sand]', which is thought to have come from the geology of Mannar Island which was formed by the accumulation of sand.

== History ==
Formerly, the town was renowned as a centre of pearl fishing, mentioned in the 2nd-century CE Periplus of the Erythraean Sea.

Mannar is known for its baobab trees and for its fort, built by the Portuguese in 1560 and taken by the Dutch in 1658 and rebuilt; its ramparts and bastions are intact, though the interior is largely destroyed.

Visually, the modern town is dominated by its churches, Hindu temples and mosques. The Catholic Church has a diocese headquartered in the town. By rail, the town is connected to the rest of Sri Lanka by the Mannar Line. It was under the control of LTTE during the Sri Lankan Civil War between 1983 and 2009.

== Climate ==
Mannar has a tropical savanna climate (Köppen: As) with warm to hot temperatures and a modest amount of rainfall. Mannar experiences a distinct wet season from October to December, and the rest of the year is fairly dry.

Climate data for Mannar (1991–2020)
Month	Jan	Feb	Mar	Apr	May	Jun	Jul	Aug	Sep	Oct	Nov	Dec	Year
Record high °C (°F)	30.4 (86.7)	32.4 (90.3)	34.2 (93.6)	35.4 (95.7)	33.8 (92.8)	33.1 (91.6)	32.2 (90.0)	32.2 (90.0)	32.1 (89.8)	32.0 (89.6)	31.1 (88.0)	30.3 (86.5)	35.4 (95.7)
Mean daily maximum °C (°F)	29.4 (84.9)	30.8 (87.4)	32.6 (90.7)	33.1 (91.6)	32.3 (90.1)	31.5 (88.7)	31.1 (88.0)	31.0 (87.8)	31.0 (87.8)	31.0 (87.8)	29.8 (85.6)	29.1 (84.4)	31.1 (88.0)
Daily mean °C (°F)	26.0 (78.8)	26.6 (79.9)	28.3 (82.9)	28.8 (83.8)	29.4 (84.9)	29.0 (84.2)	28.8 (83.8)	28.3 (82.9)	28.4 (83.1)	27.8 (82.0)	27.1 (80.8)	26.4 (79.5)	27.9 (82.2)
Mean daily minimum °C (°F)	23.9 (75.0)	23.9 (75.0)	24.7 (76.5)	25.8 (78.4)	27.4 (81.3)	27.4 (81.3)	26.6 (79.9)	26.4 (79.5)	26.3 (79.3)	25.5 (77.9)	24.7 (76.5)	24.2 (75.6)	25.6 (78.1)
Record low °C (°F)	17.5 (63.5)	16.2 (61.2)	20.1 (68.2)	17.0 (62.6)	18.9 (66.0)	20.0 (68.0)	19.6 (67.3)	19.2 (66.6)	17.5 (63.5)	15.5 (59.9)	16.0 (60.8)	16.5 (61.7)	15.5 (59.9)
Average precipitation mm (inches)	54.1 (2.13)	28.3 (1.11)	34.7 (1.37)	88.9 (3.50)	61.2 (2.41)	5.9 (0.23)	8.5 (0.33)	13.1 (0.52)	52.6 (2.07)	166.1 (6.54)	257.1 (10.12)	176.9 (6.96)	947.4 (37.30)
Average precipitation days (≥ 1.0 mm)	4.6	3.2	3.7	6.8	4.1	1.6	1.6	1.9	3.4	9.8	13.9	10.7	65.5
Source: NOAA

== See also ==
- Manthai
- Talaimannar
