= Soft loan =

Loan with a below-market rate of interest

A soft loan is a loan with a below-market rate of interest. This is also known as soft financing. Sometimes, soft loans provide other concessions to borrowers, such as long repayment periods or interest holidays. Soft loans are usually provided by governments to projects they think are worthwhile. The World Bank and other development institutions provide soft loans to developing countries.

This contrasts with a hard loan, which has to be paid back in an agreed hard currency, usually of a country with a stable, robust economy.

An example of a soft loan is a $2 billion loan by China's Export-Import Bank to Angola in October 2004 to help build infrastructure. In return, the Angolan government gave China a stake in oil exploration off the coast. Another example is the interest free soft loan of Rs. 20 billion given by the Asian Development Bank (ADB) to the government of West Bengal (India) on the condition that it be used for health, education and developing infrastructure, and that the government would implement 16 economic reforms.

The field of natural finance uses the term "soft loan" as an enforced ability–based repayment loan where the softness is not based on below market interest, but rather on terms that do not include fixed dates for repayment, but do mandate repayment when the borrower is able to.
