= Pamban (disambiguation) =

Pamban is a town on Pamban Island in the Indian state of Tamil Nadu.

Pamban may also refer to:

- New Pamban Bridge, rail bridge connecting Pamban Island with mainland India
- Pamban Bridge, defunct rail bridge that connected Pamban Island with mainland India
- Pamban Lighthouse, lighthouse on Pamban Island
- Pamban Swamigal (1848–1929), Saivite saint and poet
