= Pamban Island =

Island in the Indian Ocean between India and Sri Lanka

Native name: Pāmpaṉ tīvu
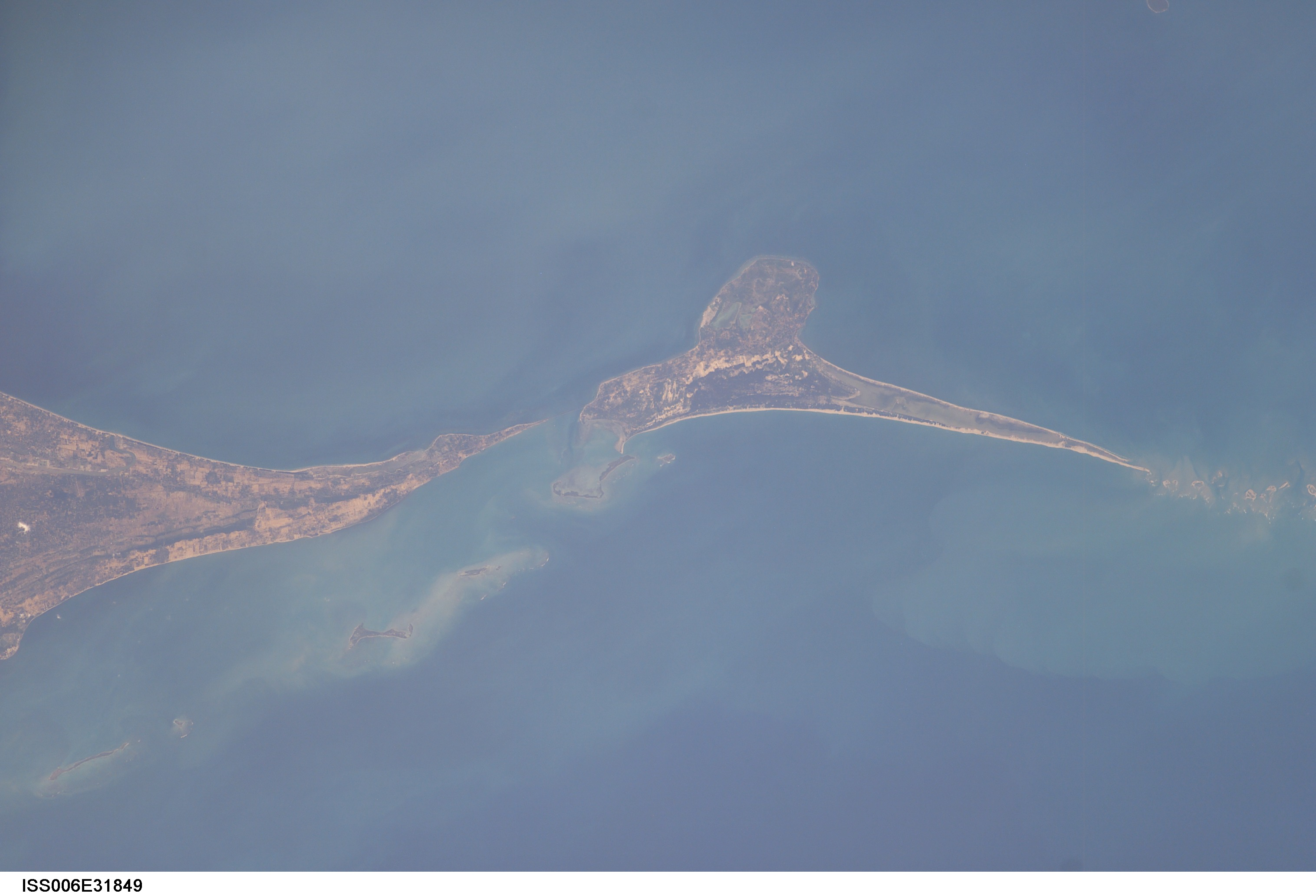
- Pamban Island (right) taken from the International Space Station

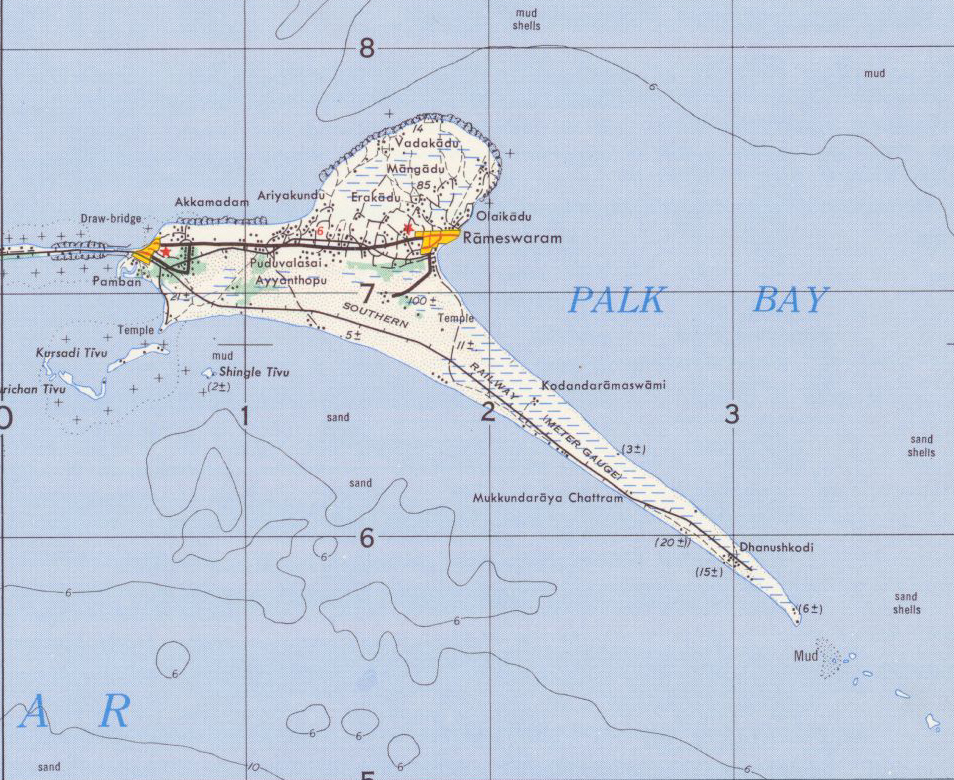
- Map of Pamban Island (1955)

- Location within India Location within Tamil Nadu

Geography
- Coordinates: 9.25°N 79.3°E
- Area: 96.6 km^{2} (37.3 sq mi)
- Coastline: 76.5 km (47.53 mi)
- Highest elevation: 10 m (30 ft)

Administration
- India
- State: Tamil Nadu
- District: Ramanathapuram
- Taluk: Rameswaram

Demographics
- Population: 82,682 (2011)
- Ethnic groups: Tamils

Pamban Island (Tamil: Pāmpaṉ tīvu, Tamil: [paːmbɐn]) is an island located off the southeast coast of mainland India. It is separated from the island of Sri Lanka by the Palk Strait, and has the Palk Bay in the Bay of Bengal to the east and the Gulf of Mannar in the Laccadive Sea to the west. It forms part of the Rameswaram taluk in the Ramanathapuram district of the Indian state of Tamil Nadu. It is the largest island in Tamil Nadu by area and the principal town in the island is the pilgrimage centre of Rameswaram. It is connected to the Indian mainland by the Pamban Bridge.

== Geography ==
Pamban Island located about 2 km (1.2 mi) off the southeast coast of mainland India. The island along with the shoals of Rama Setu (Adam's Bridge), and Mannar Island of Sri Lanka, separate the Palk Strait and the Palk Bay in the Bay of Bengal from the Gulf of Mannar in the Laccadive Sea. Pamban Island occupies an area of 96.6 km^{2} (37.3 sq mi), and is the largest island in the state of Tamil Nadu. It extends for 30 km (19 mi) from the township of Pamban in the north-west to Dhanushkodi in the south-east. Pamban serves as the point of entry to the island from the mainland. The sea around the island has an average depth of 3–5 m (9.8–16.4 ft) on the north-western side while the south-western side has a depth of 15–20 m (49–66 ft). The island is surrounded by coral reefs, which support varied marine life.

=== Climate ===
Pamban Island experiences a tropical climate and is categorised as 'Aw' under the Köppen climate classification. The annual average temperature is 28.2 °C (82.8 °F), with May being the hottest month with an average temperature of 30.4 °C (86.7 °F) and December being the coldest at 26 °C (79 °F). The average annual rainfall is 90.2 cm (35.5 in) with the highest rainfall usually recorded in November. The island is susceptible to tropical cyclones. In December 1964, a tropical cyclone stuck the island with wind speeds of over 280 km/h (170 mph) and resulted in 7 m (23 ft) high tidal waves lashing the coast. It resulted in large scale destruction of the island, claiming over 1,800 lives. The sea around the island receded about 500 m (1,600 ft) from the coastline, briefly exposing the submerged parts before tsunami waves struck the coast on 26 December 2004.

== Geology ==
Pamban Island is prone to high-intensity geomorphic activity. A study conducted by the Geological Survey of India indicated that the southern part of Dhanushkodi facing the Gulf of Mannar sank by almost 5 m (16 ft) in 1948 and 1949, due to vertical tectonic movement of land parallel to the coastline. As a result of this, a patch of land of about 0.5 km (0.31 mi) in width, stretching 7 km (4.3 mi) from north to south, was submerged under the sea. The island has a largely lowland terrain with a few elevated physical features and a maximum altitude of 10 m (33 ft). Gandamadana is the tallest hillock in the island, and as per Hindu mythology, Rama observed Sri Lanka from atop the hillock before constructing a bridge to reach Sri Lanka. Most of the island is covered with white sand, with patches of black and red soil. Coconut and palm trees are the major vegetation found in the islands with mud flats, scrubland, salt marshes, and mangroves along the coast.

== Administration ==
Pamban Island forms part of the Rameswaram taluk of Ramanathapuram district. The island forms part of the Rameswaram firka (revenue block), and consists of the revenue villages of Rameswaram and Pamban. For administrative purposes, Rameswaram is governed as a municipality. There are two other village panchayats–Pamban and Thangachimadam, which form part of the Mandapam panchayat block. In 2024, the Government of Tamil Nadu proposed to merge the two village panchayats with the Rameswaram municipality, and led to protests from the locals.

== Demographics ==
As per the 2011 census, Rameswaram had a population of 44,856 inhabitants and was the most populous town on the island.

The economy of the island is dependent on fisheries and tourism. The Ramanathaswamy Temple at Rameswaram is a major Hindu religious and pilgrimage site. Other religious sites including the Ekantha Ramar temple, where Rama is said to have stayed before traveling to Sri Lanka, Ramar Padam temple located atop the Gandamadana hillock, and Amrutha theertham, a fresh water well created by Rama. Dhanushkodi has been a ghost town since its destruction from the 1964 cyclone. The ruins of the town have become a popular tourist destination.

== Transportation ==
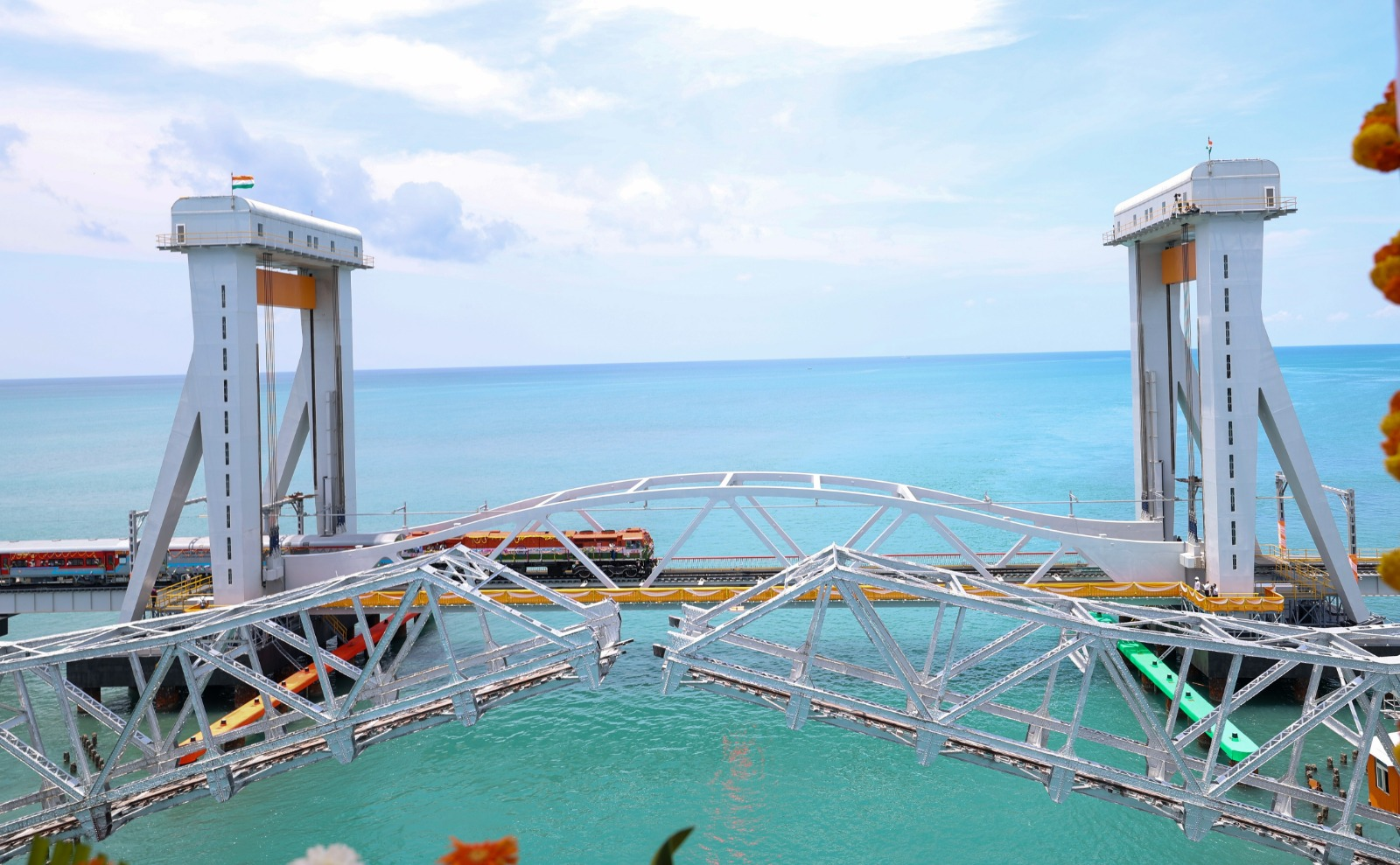
A train on the New Pamban Bridge with the old Pamban Bridge in the foreground

The Pamban Island is linked to the Indian mainland by the Pamban Bridge, which was opened for traffic on 24 February 1914. A new railway bridge was completed near the old Pamban Bridge in 2024 after rail transportation on the old bridge was suspended permanently in February 2023 due to concerns on stability of the bridge. An adjacent road bridge was opened in 1988. In the early 20th century, trains used to traverse from Madras to Dhanushkodi at the southern tip of the Pamban island and a ferry connected to Talaimannar on the Mannar Island, before a train carried passengers to Colombo. The railway line to Dhanushkodi was swept away during 1964 cyclone along with the Pamban-Dhanuskodi passenger train, killing around 200 people. The ferry service continued till the 1970s between Rameswaram and Talaimannar, but was discontinued by the Indian Government in 1984.

The Palk Strait Bridge is a proposed undersea tunnel and bridge linking the Pamban Island with Sri Lanka.

== See also ==
- Pamban Lighthouse – Lighthouse in Pamban Island, India
- Ramayana – Ancient Sanskrit epic written by Valmiki
- Rameswaram TV Tower – Television broadcasting tower in Rameswaram, Tamil Nadu, India
