= Pamban =

- Town
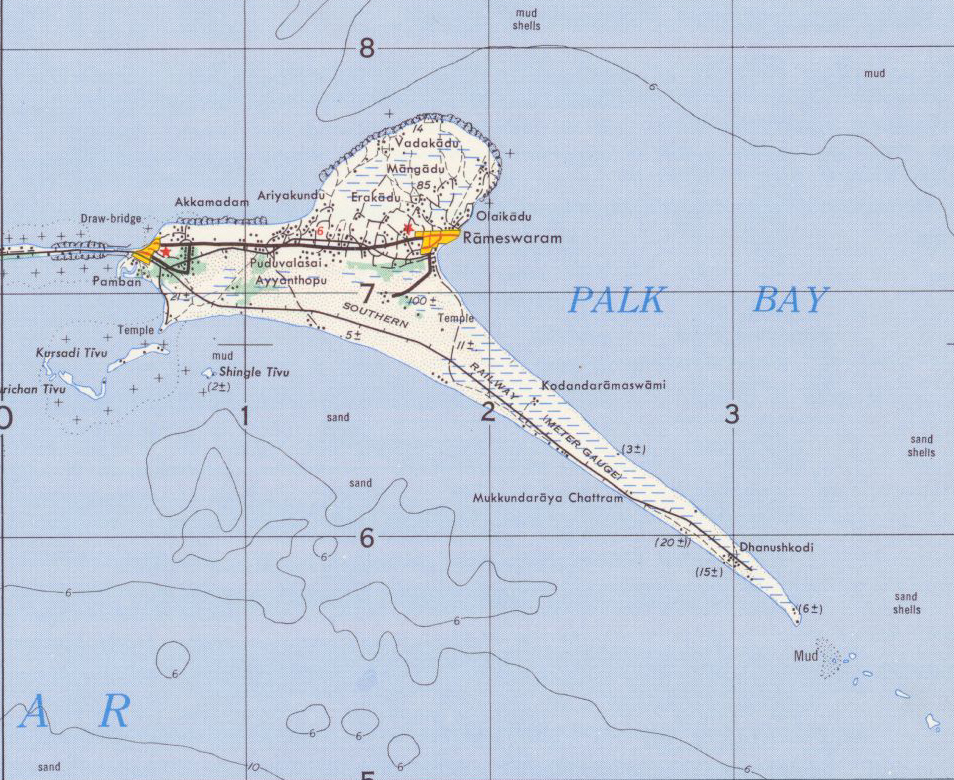
- Map of Pamban island showing the location of Pamban along its western edge

- Location in Tamil Nadu, India Pamban (India)
- Coordinates: 9°17′N 79°12′E
- Country: India
- State: Tamil Nadu
- District: Ramanathapuram

Population (2011)
  - Total: 37,819

Languages
  - Official: Tamil
- Time zone: UTC+5:30 (IST)

Pamban (Tamil: [paːmbɐn]) is a town in the Rameswaram taluk of Ramanathapuram district, Tamil Nadu. It is located at the west edge of Pamban Island. It is connected to mainland India with two rail bridges, and a road bridge.

== Demographics ==
As per the 2011 census, Pamban had a population of 37,819 with 19,163 males and 18,656 females. The literacy rate was 85.16%.

== Climate ==
Pamban has a tropical savanna climate (Köppen climate classification As) with hot summers and cool winters. Unlike most locations in India with this climate, most rainfall occurs in autumn and winter, with the heaviest rain falling from October to December, and very little rain in the summer months of June to August.

Climate data for Pamban (1991–2020, extremes 1902–2020)
| Month | Jan | Feb | Mar | Apr | May | Jun | Jul | Aug | Sep | Oct | Nov | Dec | Year |
|---|---|---|---|---|---|---|---|---|---|---|---|---|---|
| Record high °C (°F) | 33.6 (92.5) | 34.5 (94.1) | 35.7 (96.3) | 38.0 (100.4) | 38.8 (101.8) | 37.2 (99.0) | 37.5 (99.5) | 37.5 (99.5) | 36.9 (98.4) | 36.5 (97.7) | 35.4 (95.7) | 33.9 (93.0) | 38.8 (101.8) |
| Mean daily maximum °C (°F) | 29.2 (84.6) | 30.7 (87.3) | 32.9 (91.2) | 34.3 (93.7) | 34.2 (93.6) | 33.6 (92.5) | 33.4 (92.1) | 33.1 (91.6) | 33.0 (91.4) | 32.3 (90.1) | 30.3 (86.5) | 29.0 (84.2) | 32.2 (90.0) |
| Mean daily minimum °C (°F) | 24.2 (75.6) | 24.2 (75.6) | 25.3 (77.5) | 27.3 (81.1) | 28.1 (82.6) | 27.7 (81.9) | 27.2 (81.0) | 26.8 (80.2) | 26.7 (80.1) | 26.0 (78.8) | 25.0 (77.0) | 24.4 (75.9) | 26.1 (79.0) |
| Record low °C (°F) | 17.0 (62.6) | 17.0 (62.6) | 19.4 (66.9) | 20.3 (68.5) | 19.8 (67.6) | 20.2 (68.4) | 20.7 (69.3) | 20.0 (68.0) | 20.6 (69.1) | 20.0 (68.0) | 19.5 (67.1) | 18.2 (64.8) | 17.0 (62.6) |
| Average rainfall mm (inches) | 46.4 (1.83) | 17.9 (0.70) | 12.6 (0.50) | 46.4 (1.83) | 44.1 (1.74) | 6.9 (0.27) | 5.5 (0.22) | 19.6 (0.77) | 41.4 (1.63) | 217.7 (8.57) | 306.9 (12.08) | 187.4 (7.38) | 952.7 (37.51) |
| Average rainy days | 2.3 | 1.5 | 0.8 | 2.5 | 2.1 | 0.5 | 0.5 | 1.0 | 1.7 | 8.7 | 13.1 | 8.3 | 43 |
| Average relative humidity (%) (at 17:30 IST) | 74 | 71 | 68 | 69 | 75 | 75 | 74 | 75 | 77 | 77 | 79 | 79 | 74 |
Source: India Meteorological Department

== Transport ==
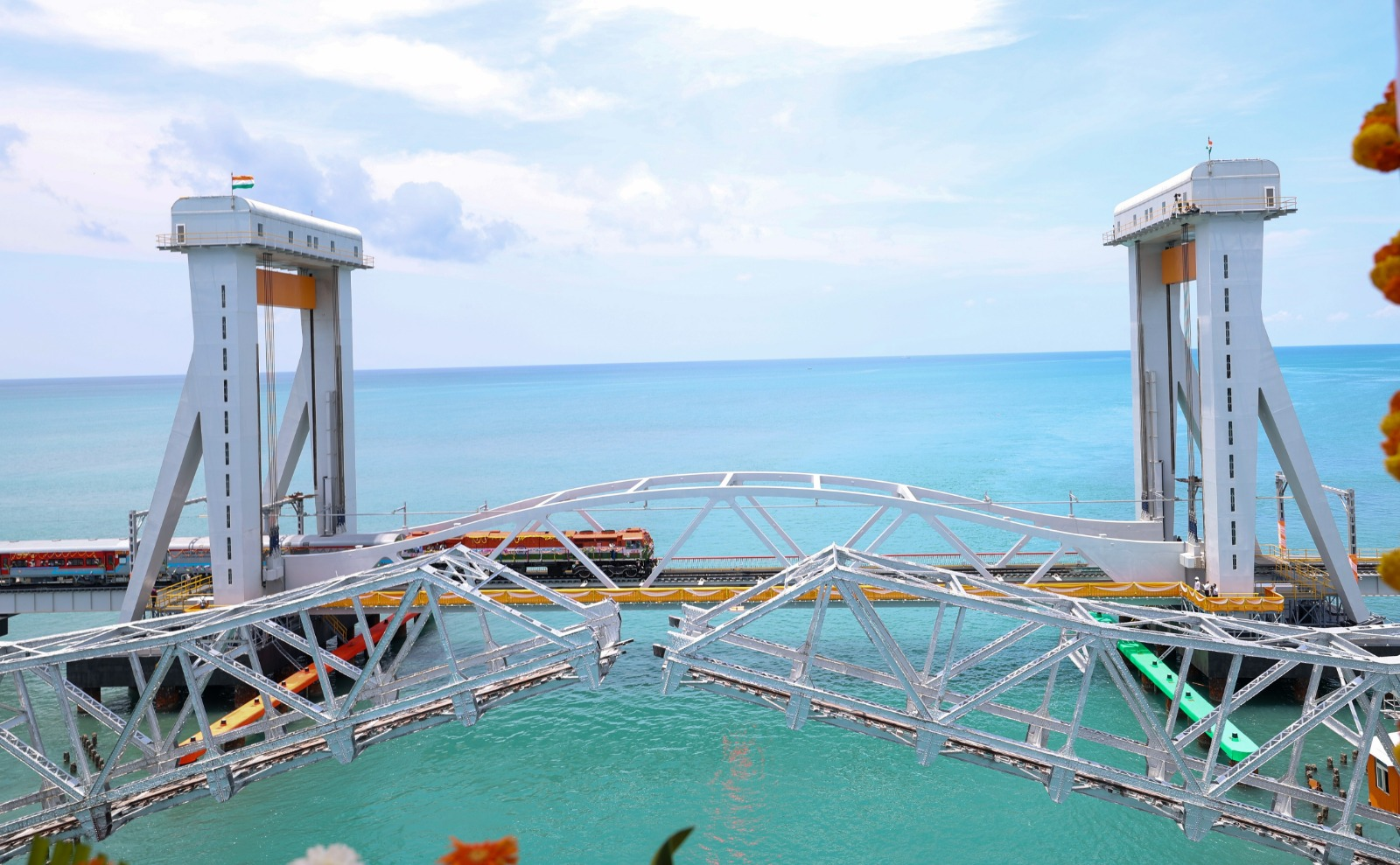
A train on the New Pamban Bridge with the old Pamban Bridge in the foreground

The Pamban Bridge is a 2,064 m (6,772 ft)–long rail bridge which connected Mandapam in mainland India with Pamban at the tip of Pamban Island. It was opened on 24 February 1914, and was India's first sea bridge. A road bridge was constructed adjacent to the rail bridge in 1989. In 2020, the Government of India announced that a new railway bridge will be constructed near the old Pamban Bridge at a cost of ₹2.5 billion (equivalent to ₹3.2 billion or US$34 million in 2026). In December 2022, rail transportation on the bridge was suspended permanently as the bridge had weakened significantly due to corrosion.

The New Pamban Bridge was completed in 2024 and was opened for traffic in April 2025. The new bridge is constructed parallel to the old bridge and spans a length of 2.07 km (1.29 mi). It has a bascule section of about 72 m (236 ft) which can be lifted vertically using a Scherzer rolling lift trunnion and is the first vertical lift sea bridge in India.

The Pamban Lighthouse is located on the Pamban Island. It was first commissioned on 21 April 1846, with a 41-foot brick-and-lime tower using coconut-oil wick lamps and parabolic reflectors. In 1860, the tower was raised and fitted with a 4th-order dioptric lens and later upgraded in 1902 with an occulting optic. During this time, it was reconstructed into 66-foot cylindrical tower in 1902 to aid navigation through the Pamban Canal during British rule.
