= Rameswaram =

Pilgrimage centre and a town in Tamil Nadu, India

Rameswaram இராமேஸ்வரம்
- Town
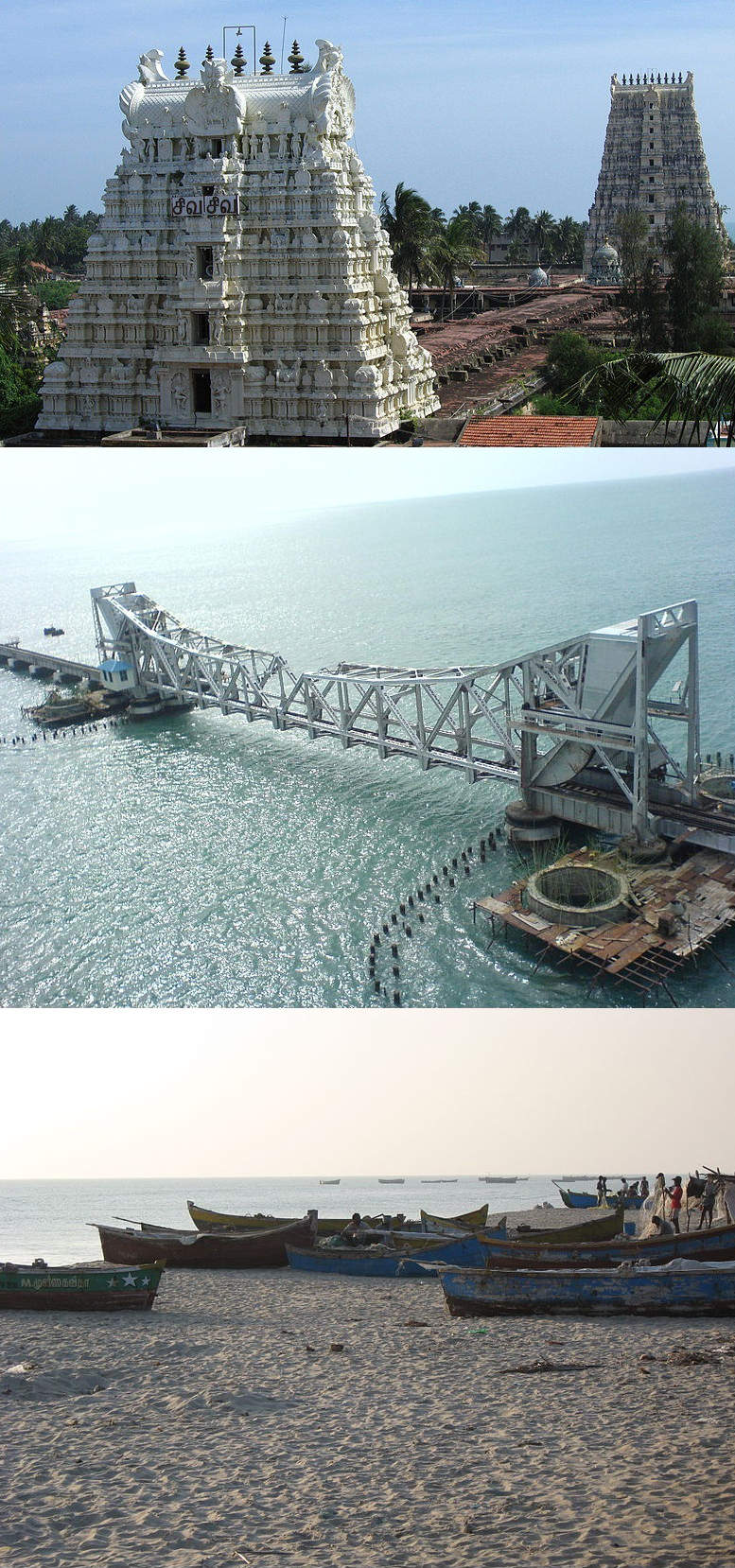
- From top: Ramanathaswamy Temple tower, Pamban Bridge, and a set of fishing boats.

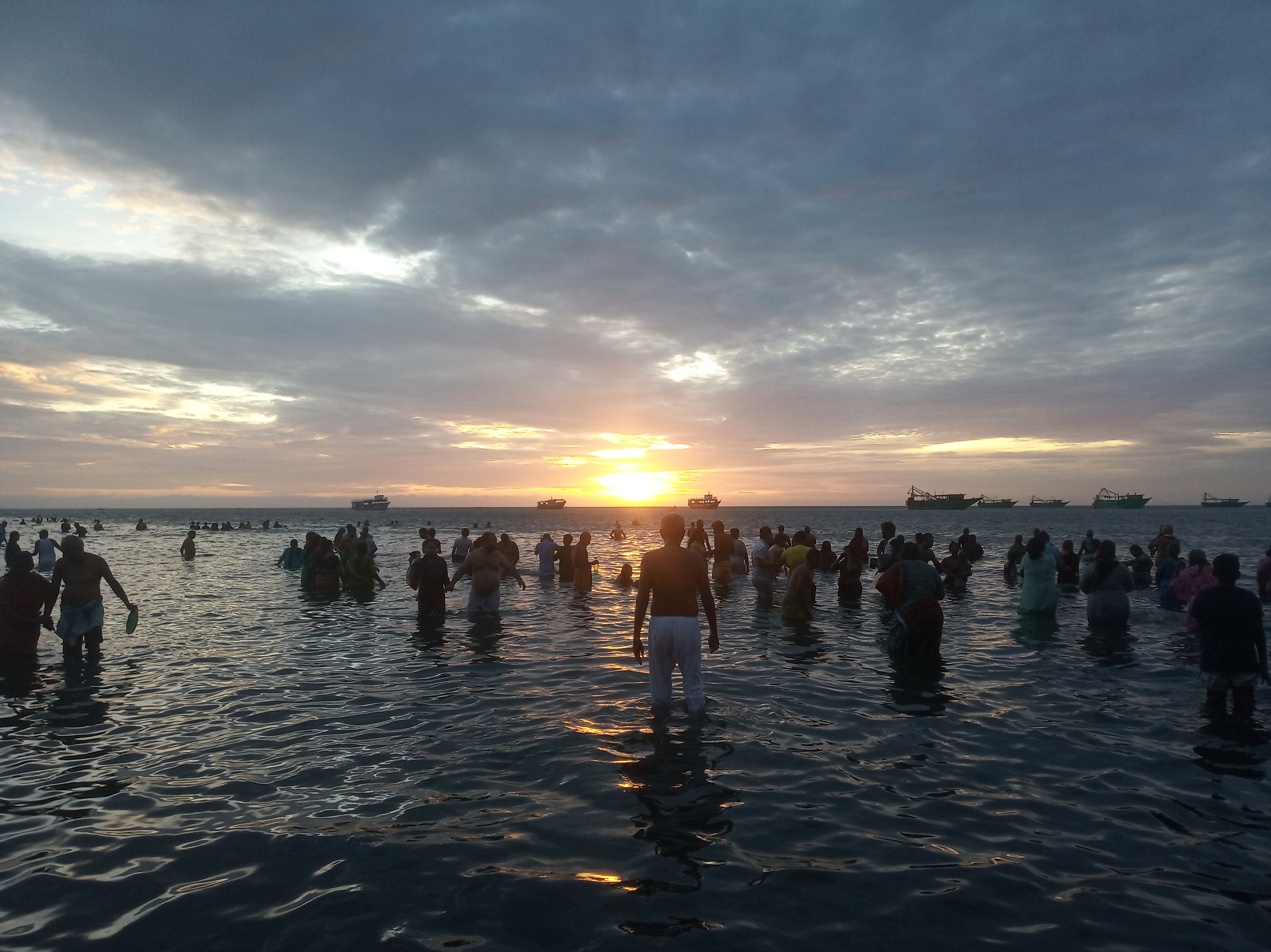
- Nicknames: Rameswaram, Ramesvaram, Rameshwaram Rameswaram Morning

- Location within Tamil Nadu Location within India
- Coordinates: 9.288°N 79.313°E
- Country: India
- State: Tamil Nadu
- District: Ramanathapuram

Government
  - Type: Selection Grade Municipality
  - Body: Municipality of Rameswaram

Area
  - Total: 55 km^{2} (21 sq mi)
- Elevation: 10 m (33 ft)

Population (2011)
  - Total: 44,856
  - Density: 820/km^{2} (2,100/sq mi)
- Demonym: Rameswaram mar

Language
  - Official: Tamil
- Time zone: UTC+5:30 (IST)
- PIN CODE: 623526
- Vehicle registration: TN 65

Rameswaram (IPA: [ɾaːmeːsʋaɾam]; also transliterated as Ramesvaram, Rameshwaram) is a town in the Ramanathapuram district of the Indian state of Tamil Nadu. It is situated on the Pamban Island, separated from mainland India by the Pamban channel and is about 40 kilometres (25 mi) from Mannar Island, Sri Lanka, across the Gulf of Mannar. Rameswaram has been administered by a municipal body since 1994. It covers 53 km² and hosts a population of 44,856 as per the 2011 Census of India. Tourism and fishing are the primary sources of employment for its residents.

Rameswaram is the terminus of the railway line from Chennai and Madurai. It is one of the significant places in Hinduism—one of the four Hindu temples in the Char Dham pilgrimage tradition. According to the Hindu epic Ramayana, the deity Rama is believed to have built a bridge from the vicinity of Rameshwaram across the sea to Lanka to rescue his wife Sita from her abductor Ravana. The Ramanathaswamy Temple, dedicated to the Hindu deity Shiva, is at the centre of the town. The temple and the town are considered as holy pilgrimage sites for Shaiva and Vaishnava sects. Geological research suggested that the shoal chain Adam's Bridge, also known as Rama Sethu, was formerly a land connection between India and Sri Lanka.

The Sethusamudram Shipping Canal Project, the border disputes over Kachchatheevu, Sri Lankan Tamil refugees from the Sri Lankan Civil War and genocide, and the capturing of local fishermen for alleged cross-border activities by Sri Lankan Forces, are some of the major controversies related to Rameshwaram.

== Legend ==
Char Dham

Rameswaram means "Lord of Rama" (Rāma-īśvaram) in Sanskrit, an epithet of Shiva, the presiding deity of the Ramanathaswamy Temple. According to Hindu epic Ramayana, Rama, the seventh avatar of the god Vishnu, prayed to Shiva post his war against the demon-king Ravana in Sri Lanka. According to the Puranas (Hindu scriptures), upon the advice of sages, Rama, along with his wife Sita and his brother Lakshmana, worshipped the lingam (an iconic symbol of Shiva). To worship Shiva, Rama wanted to have a lingam and directed his trusted lieutenant Hanuman to bring it from Himalayas. Since it took longer to bring the lingam, Sita built a lingam made of sand from the nearby seashore, which is also believed to be the one in the sanctum of the temple. Sethu Karai is a place 22 km (14 mi) before the island of Rameswaram from where Rama is as having built a floating stone bridge, the Ramsetu bridge, that further continued to Dhanushkodi in Rameswaram till Talaimannar in Sri Lanka. According to another version, as quoted in Adhyatma Ramayana, Rama installed the lingam before the construction of the bridge to Lanka.

== History ==
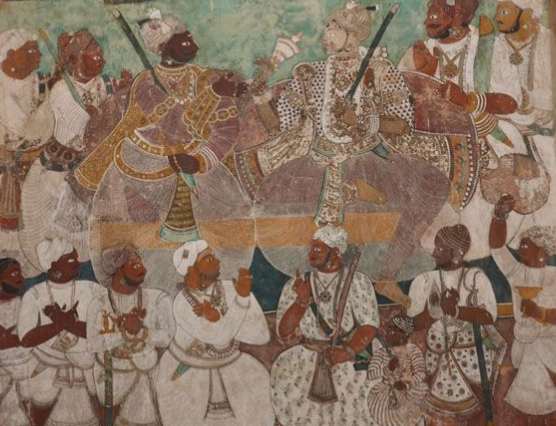
Court of Vijaya Raghunatha Sethupathi I

The history of Rameswaram is centred around the island being a transit point to reach Sri Lanka (Ceylon historically) and the presence of Ramanathaswamy Temple. Tevaram, the 7th–8th century Tamil compositions on Shiva by the three prominent Nayanars (Shaivites) namely Appar, Sundarar and Sambandar. The Chola king Rajendra Chola I (1012–1040 CE) had a control of the town for a short period. The Jaffna kingdom (1215–1624 CE) had close connections with the island and claimed the title Setukavalan meaning custodians of the Rameswaram. Hinduism was their state religion and they made generous contribution to the temple. Setu was used in their coins as well as in inscriptions as marker of the dynasty.

According to Firishta, Malik Kafur, the head general of Alauddin Khalji, the ruler of Delhi Sultanate, reached Rameswaram during his political campaign in spite of stiff resistance from the Pandyan princes in the early 14th century. He erected a mosque by name Alia al-Din Khaldji in honour of victory of Islam. The records left by the court historians of the Delhi Sultanate state that Malik Kafur raided Madurai, Chidambaram, Srirangam, Vriddhachalam, Rameswaram and other sacred temple towns, destroyed the temples which were sources of gold and jewels. He brought back enormous loot from Dwarasamudra and the Pandya kingdom to Delhi in 1311.

During the early 15th century, the present-day Ramanathapuram, Kamuthi and Rameswaram were included in the Pandya dynasty. In 1520 CE, the town came under the rule of Vijayanagara Empire. The Sethupathis, the breakaway from Madurai Nayaks, ruled Ramanathapuram and contributed to the Ramanathaswamy temple. The most notable of them are the contributions of Muthu Kumara Ragunatha and Muthu Ramalinga Sethupathi, who transformed the temple to an architectural ensemble. The region then fell under the rule of different leaders Chanda Sahib (1740–1754 CE), Arcot Nawab and Muhammed Yusuf Khan (1725–1764 CE) in the middle of the 18th century. In 1795 CE, Rameswaram came under the direct control of the British East India Company and was annexed to the Madras Presidency. After 1947, the town became a part of independent India.

== Geography ==
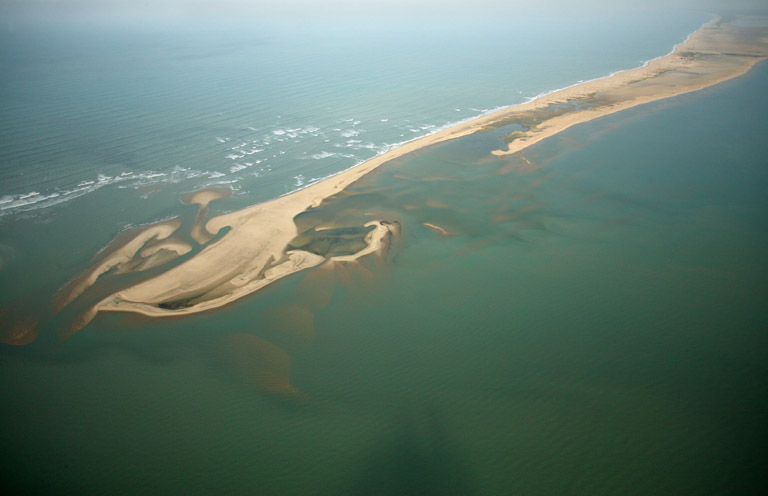
An aerial view of Dhanushkodi, at the tip of Rameswaram

Rameswaram has an average elevation of 10 m (33 ft). The island is spread across an area of 61.8 km^{2} (23.9 sq mi) and is in the shape of a conch. 74% of the area has sandy soil due to the presence of sea and it has many islands surrounding it, the Palk Strait in the north west and Gulf of Mannar in the south East. The Ramanathaswamy Temple occupies major area of Rameswaram. The beach of Rameswaram is featured with no waves at all – the sea waves rise to a maximum height of 3 cm (0.10 ft) and the view looks like a very big river.

Rameswaram has dry tropical climate with low humidity, with average monthly rainfall of 75.73 mm (2.981 in), mostly from North-East monsoon from October to January. The highest ever temperature recorded at Pamban station was 37 °C (99 °F) and the lowest was 17 °C (63 °F).

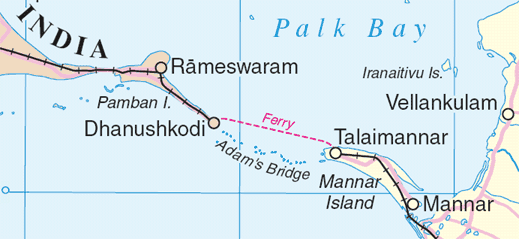
Map of Ramsetu's Bridge (a chain of limestone shoals) and environs, before the cyclone of 1964.

Ramsetu Bridge is a chain of limestone shoals, between Rameswaram and Mannar Island, off the northwestern coast of Sri Lanka. Geological evidence suggests that this bridge is a former land connection between India and Sri Lanka. The bridge is 29 km (18 mi) long and separates the Gulf of Mannar (North-East) from the Palk Strait (South-West). It was reportedly passable on foot up to the 15th century until storms deepened the channel. The temple records record that Rama's Bridge was completely above sea level until it broke in a cyclone in 1480 CE. The bridge was first mentioned in the ancient Indian Sanskrit epic Ramayana of Valmiki. The name Rama's Bridge or Rama Setu (Sanskrit; setu: bridge) refers to the bridge built by the Vanara (ape men) army of Rama in Hindu mythology, which he used to reach Lanka and rescue his wife Sita from the demon king Ravana. The Ramayana attributes the building of this bridge to Rama in verse 2–22–76, naming it as Setubandhanam. The sea separating India and Sri Lanka is called Sethusamudram meaning "Sea of the Bridge". Maps prepared by a Dutch cartographer in 1747 CE, available at the Tanjore Saraswathi Mahal Library show this area as Ramancoil, a colloquial form of the Tamil Raman Kovil (or Rama's Temple). Many other maps in Schwartzberg's historical atlas and other sources such as travel texts by Marco Polo call this area by various names such as Adam's Bridge, Sethubandha and Sethubandha Rameswaram.

== Demographics ==
Religious census
| Religion | Percent(%) |
| Hindu | 87.4% |
| Christian | 8.13% |
| Muslim | 4.36% |
| Sikh | 0.03% |
| Buddhist | 0.01% |
| Other | 0.07% |

Historical population
| Year | Pop. | ±% |
|---|---|---|
| 1971 | 16,755 | — |
| 1981 | 27,928 | +66.7% |
| 1991 | 32,721 | +17.2% |
| 2001 | 37,968 | +16.0% |
| 2011 | 44,857 | +18.1% |
Sources: 1971–2001: 2011:

According to 2011 census, Rameswaram had a population of 44,856 with a sex-ratio of 969 females for every 1,000 males, much above the national average of 929. A total of 5,022 were under the age of six, constituting 2,544 males and 2,478 females. Scheduled Castes and Scheduled Tribes accounted for 6.8% and .03% of the population respectively. The average literacy of the town was 73.36%, compared to the national average of 72.99%. The town had a total of 10579 households. There were a total of 16,645 workers, comprising 69 cultivators, 20 main agricultural labourers, 148 in house hold industries, 15,130 other workers, 1,278 marginal workers, 11 marginal cultivators, 26 marginal agricultural labourers, 44 marginal workers in household industries and 1,197 other marginal workers. The total number of households below poverty lane (BPL) in 2003 were 976, which is 10.45% of the total households in the town and these were raised to 3003 (29.12%) in 2007.

As per the religious census of 2011, Rameswaram had 87.4% Hindus, 4.36% Muslims, 8.13% Christians, 0.03% Sikhs, 0.01% Buddhists, and 0.07% following other religions.

== Municipal Administration and politics ==
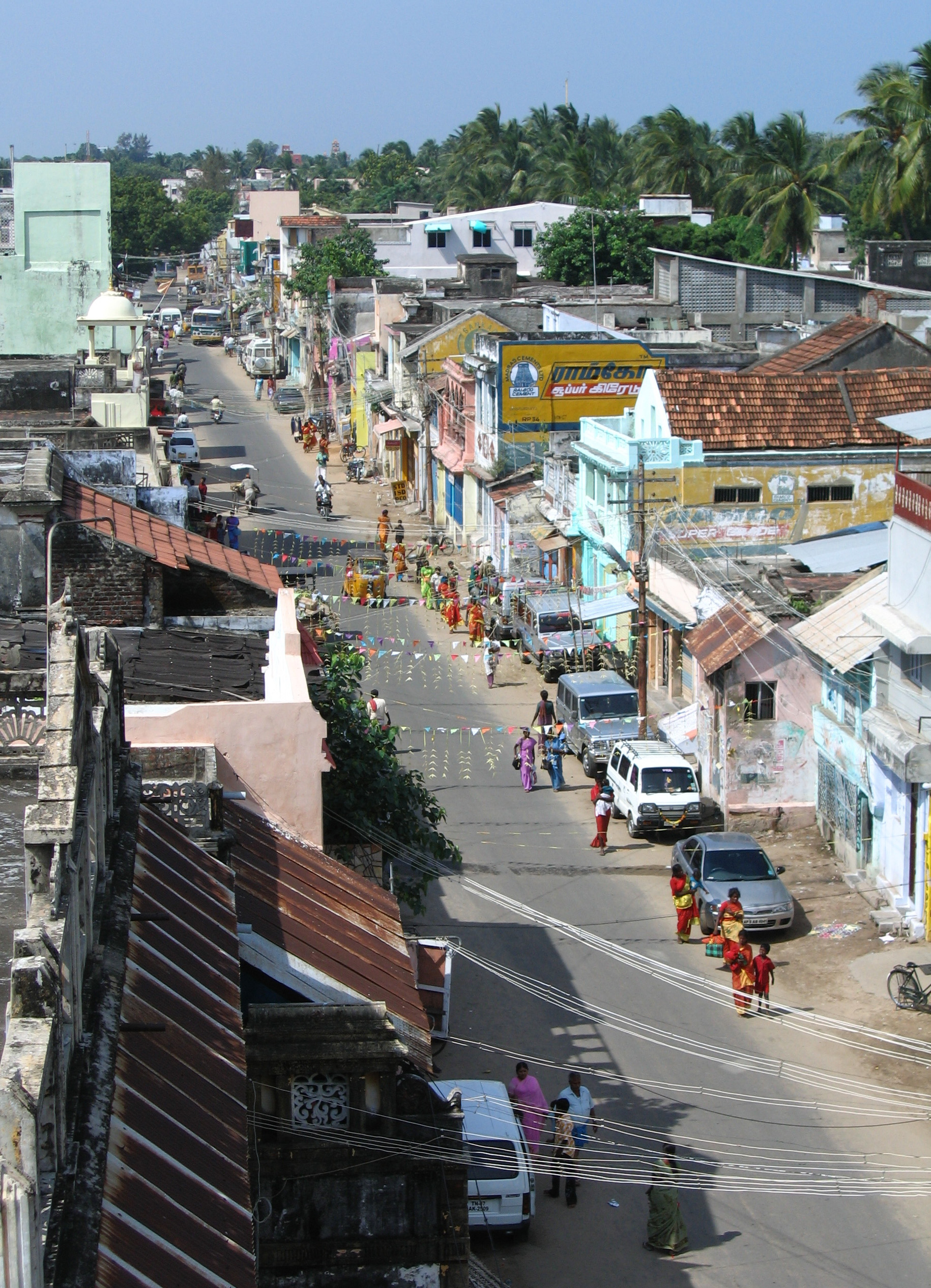
A street in Rameswaram

Municipality Officials
| Commissioner | A. Kannan |
| Chairman | K.E. Naazarkhan |
| Vice Chairman | V. Dhatchanamoorthy |
| Appointment Committee Leader | D. Mugeshkumar |
Elected Members
| Member of Legislative Assembly | Katharbatcha Muthuramalingam |
| Member of Parliament | Kani K. Navas |

According to the Madras Presidency Panchayat Act of 1885, Rameswaram was declared a panchyat union during British times. It became a township during 1958 and was declared a municipality in 2004. Rameswaram is a 3rd grade municipality having 21 wards, out of which 6 are general wards for women and one is reserved for Scheduled Caste women. The major sources of budgeted income for Rameswaram municipality comes from the Devolution Fund of ₹17 million (equivalent to ₹42 million or US$440,000 in 2026) and property tax of ₹2.4 million (equivalent to ₹5.9 million or US$63,000 in 2026). The major expense heads are for salaries of ₹6 million (equivalent to ₹15 million or US$160,000 in 2026), operating expenses of ₹3.7 million (equivalent to ₹9.1 million or US$97,000 in 2026), and repair & maintenance expenditure of ₹2.3 million (equivalent to ₹5.6 million or US$60,000 in 2026). The functions of the municipality are devolved into six departments: General, Engineering, Revenue, Public Health, Town planning and the Computer Wing. All these departments are under the control of a Municipal Commissioner who is the supreme executive head. The legislative powers are vested in a body of 21 members, one each from the 21 wards. The legislative body is headed by an elected Chairperson assisted by a Deputy Chairperson.

Rameswaram comes under the Ramanathapuram assembly constituency and it elects a member to the Tamil Nadu Legislative Assembly once every five years. Katharbatcha Muthuramalingam from the DMK is serving as the MLA since 2021.

Rameswaram is a part of the Ramanathapuram (Lok Sabha constituency) – it has been realigned in 2008 to have the following assembly constituencies – Paramakudi (SC), Ramanathapuram, Mudukulathur, Aranthangi, Tiruchuli (newly created). The constituency was traditionally a stronghold of the Indian National Congress that won 6 times till the 1991 elections, after which it was won twice each by the All India Anna Dravida Munnetra Kazhagam (AIADMK) and the Dravida Munnetra Kazhagam (DMK). The current Member of Parliament from the constituency is A. Anwhar Raajhaa from the AIADMK party.

== Economy ==
Being a pilgrimage town, the majority of the population is involved in tourism related industry consisting of trade and services. Service sector increased from 70% in 1971 to 98.78% in 2001, while the agricultural sector reduced from 23% in 1971 to 0.13% in 2001. Rameswaram is an industrially backward town – there has been no demarcation for industrial land due to the pilgrim sanctity and ecological fragile geography. Being an island town, the traditional occupation was fishing, but due to poor returns, the people in fishing community have gradually shifted to other professions. Banks such as State Bank of India, Indian Bank, Union Bank of India and RDCC Bank have their branches in Rameswaram.

Rameshwaram has well road connectivity from Madurai by National Highway NH87 passes through Manamadurai-Paramakudi-Ramanathapuram and National Highway NH536 from Trichy passes through Pudukkottai-Karaikudi-Ramanathapuram. Indian government and state government are keep developing the road connectivity in this region as the number of tourists gets increased every year.

== Transport and communication ==
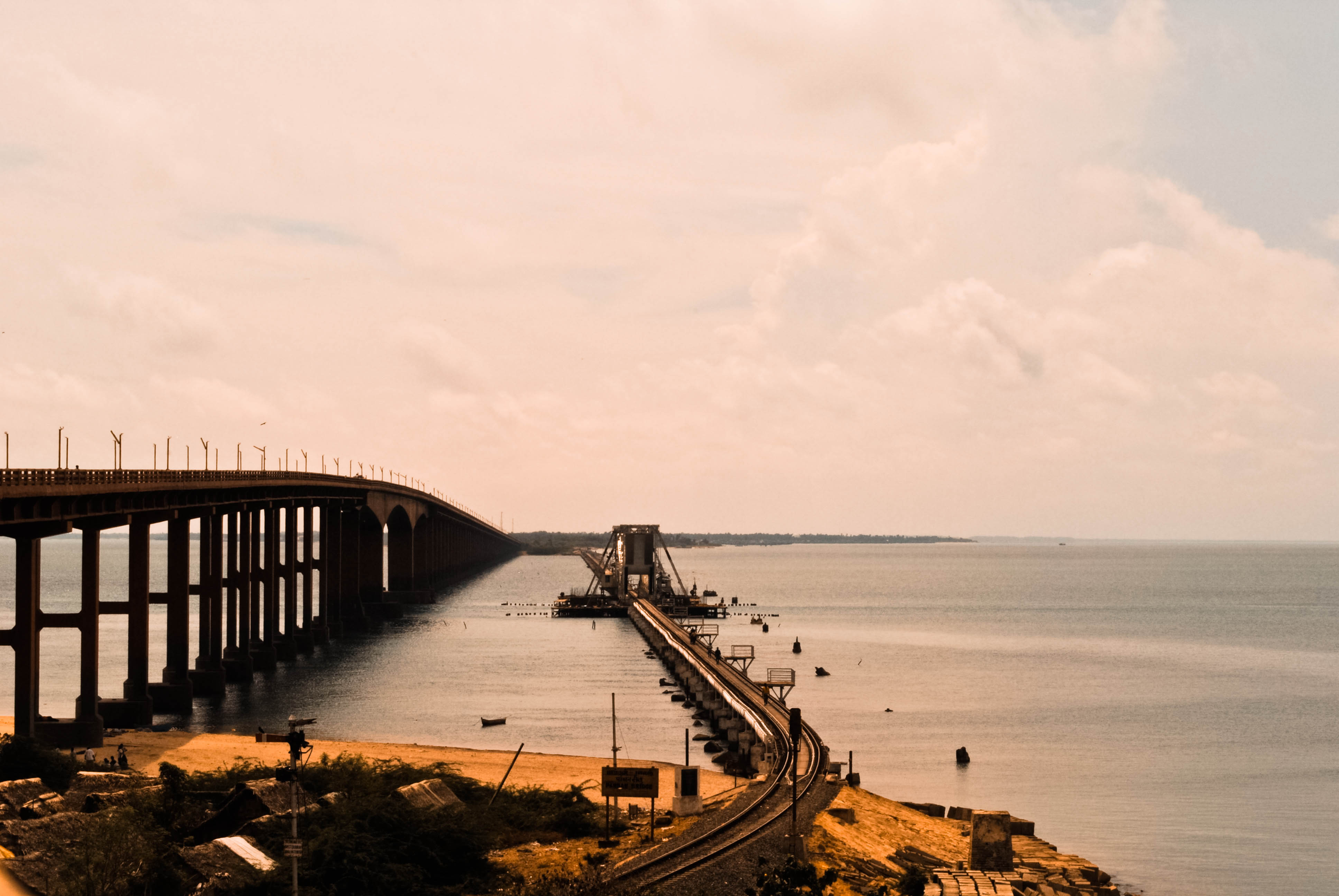
Road and rail bridge

Pamban Bridge is a cantilever bridge on the Palk Strait that connects Rameswaram to mainland India. The railway bridge is 6,776 ft (2,065 m) and was opened to traffic in 1914. The railroad bridge is a double-leaf bascule bridge section that can be raised to let ships pass under it . The railway bridge historically carried metre-gauge trains on it, but Indian Railways upgraded the bridge to carry broad-gauge trains in a project that finished on 12 August 2007. Historically, the two leaves of the bridge were opened manually using levers by workers. About 10 ships – cargo carriers, coast guard ships, fishing vessels and oil tankers pass through the bridge every month. After completion of bridge, metre-gauge lines were laid from Mandapam up to Pamban Station, from where the railway lines bifurcated into two directions, one towards Rameswaram about 6.25 miles (10.06 km) up and another branch line of 15 miles (24 km) terminating at Dhanushkodi. The noted Boat Mail ran on this track between 1915 and 1964 from Chennai Egmore up to Dhanushkodi, from where the passengers were ferried to Talaimannar in Ceylon. The metre-gauge branch line from Pamban Junction to Dhanushkodi was abandoned after it was destroyed in a cyclone in 1964.

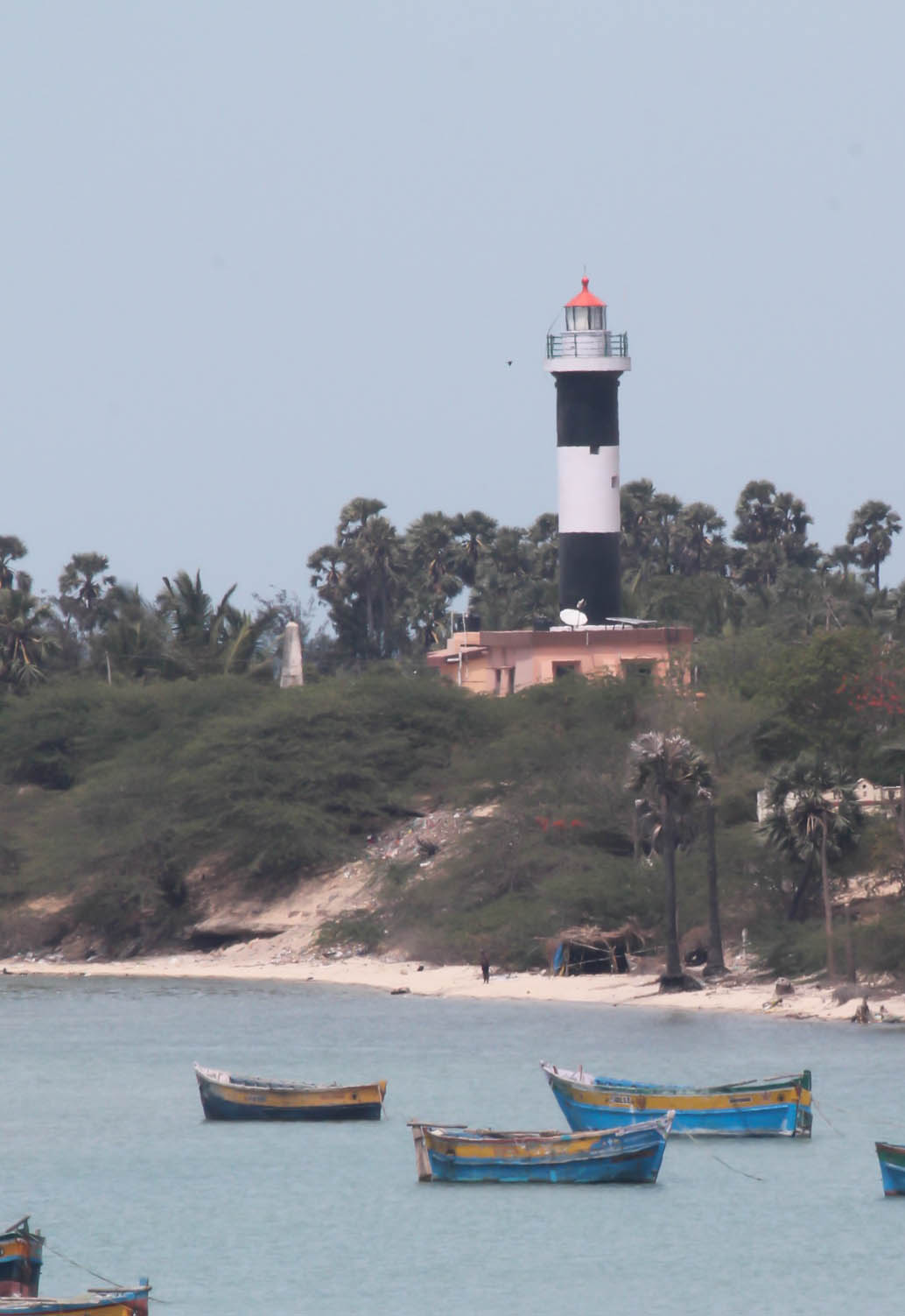
Pamban lighthouse, Rameswaram

There are daily express trains connecting major cities in Tamil Nadu like Chennai, Madurai, Trichy, Coimbatore and Karaikudi. There are express and passenger trains connecting to major destinations. The Ramanathapuram – Rameswaram National Highway is the main connecting link from Rameswaram to the mainland. Before the 1914 train service linked the mainland with Rameswaram, boats were the only mode of transport to Rameswaram island.

The State government intends to establish an airport, spread over 700 acres, in Ramanathapuram district, as announced by Finance minister Thangam Thennarasu in March 2025. The government picked five potential sites in July 2025, which will be narrowed down to three. The final site will be decided upon in 2026, after the Airports Authority of India submits a pre-feasibility report evaluating each site. The airport will have one runway which will be capable of handling Code C aircraft.

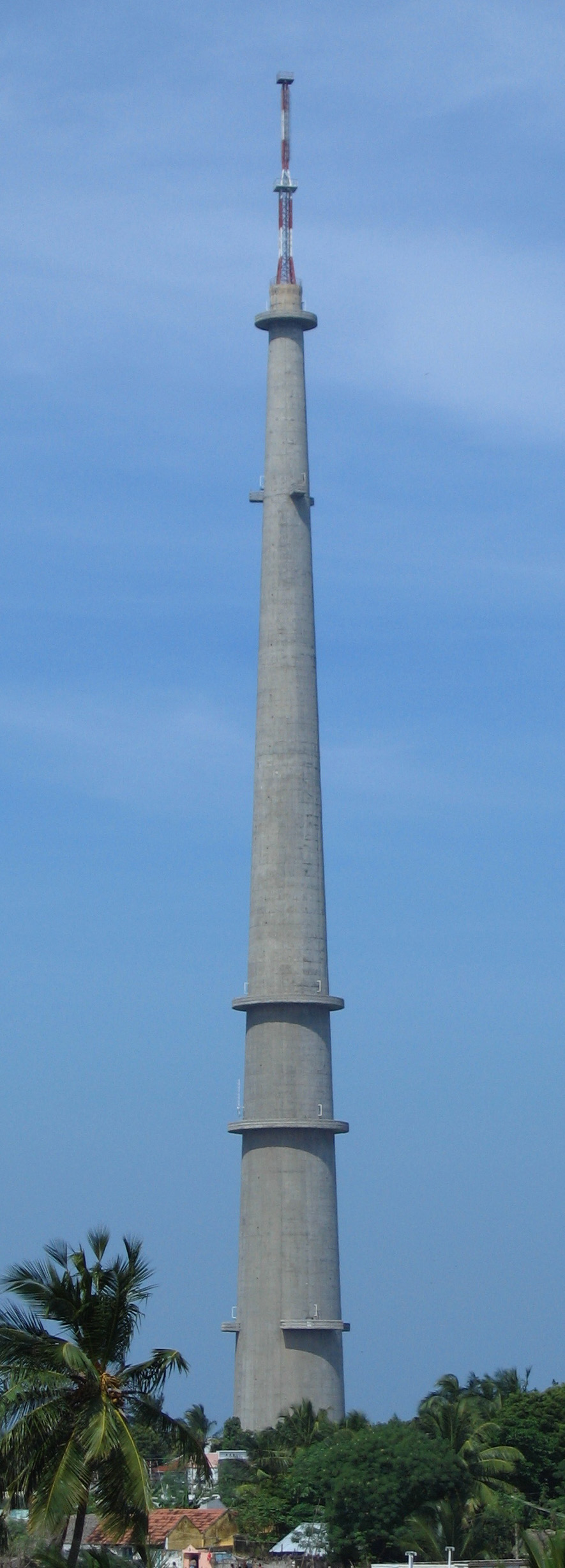
Rameswaram TV tower

The Rameswaram municipality covers a total road length of 52 km (32 mi) and 20 km (12 mi) of national highway covering about 80 percent of the town. The Tamil Nadu State Transport Corporation runs daily services connecting various cities to Rameswaram and operates a computerised reservation centre in the municipal bus stand of Rameswaram.

Rameswaram is the important port among all the ports in the district, having a ferry service to Talaimannar of Sri Lanka, though not operational throughout the year. Limited foreign trade is conducted with Jaffna, Kaits, Talaimannar and Colombo.

The Rameswaram TV Tower is the tallest tower in India. The tower is a 323 m (1,060 ft) tall circular concrete tower with a square steel mast of 45 m (148 ft) height, diameter of 24 m (79 ft) at the bottom tapering to 6.5 m (21 ft) at top. The tower has been designed for a wind velocity of 160 km/h (99 mph). There are two lighthouses in Rameswaram – the Pamban lighthouse and the Rameswaram lighthouse.

== Education and utility services ==
Ramanathapuram district has one of the lowest literacy rates in the state of Tamil Nadu and Rameswaram, following the district statistics has a lower literacy rate. There are two Government high schools, one each for boys and girls. There are seven other schools: Swami Vivekananda vidyalaya Matriculation School, St. Joseph Higher Secondary School, Mandapam Panchayat Union 9 – School, Micro Matriculation School, Sri Sankara Vidhyalaya, Holy Island Little Flower School and Kendriya Vidhyalaya School. Alagappa University Evening College is the only college present in the town and all the nearest colleges are located in Ramanathapuram and Paramakudi.

Electricity supply to the town is regulated and distributed by the Ramanathapuram circle of Tamil Nadu Electricity Board (TNEB). Water supply is provided by the Rameswaram Municipality – the head works is located at Nambunayaki Amman Kovil, Meyyambuli, Semmamadam & Natarajapuram and distributed through four over head tanks having a total capacity of 1430,000 litres. About 6 metric tonnes of solid waste are collected from the town every day in the four zones covering the whole of the town. Rameswaram does not have a sewerage system for disposal of sullage and the disposal system consists of septic tanks and public conveniences. Roadside drains carry untreated sewage out of the town to let out raw into the sea or accumulates in low-lying area.

Rameswaram comes under the Karaikudi Telecom circle of the Bharat Sanchar Nigam Limited (BSNL), India's state-owned telecom and internet services provider. Apart from telecom, BSNL also provides broadband internet service along with other major internet service provider including Reliance.

== Tourism ==
Char Dham

The town is a famous Hindu pilgrimage centre, attracting the visit of thousands of devotees everyday. Adherents assemble to receive a darshana (auspicious sight) of the temple's image of the deity Shiva, which is regarded to have been installed by Rama according to the regional legend.

=== Ramanathaswamy Temple ===
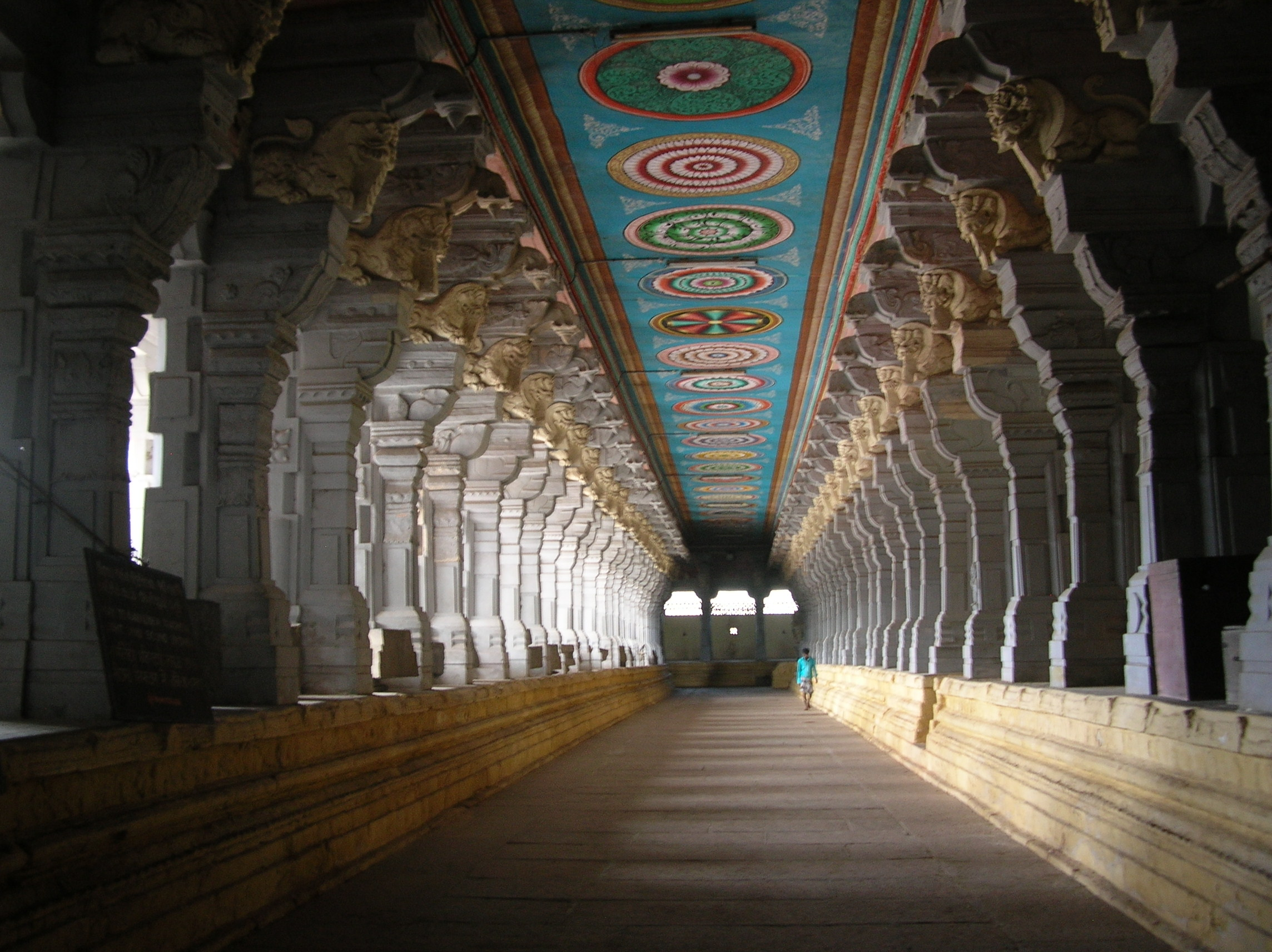
Corridor of 1000 pillars

The Ramanathaswamy Temple is the most notable historic landmark of the town. Located in the centre of town, It is a famous Hindu temple dedicated to the deity Shiva. The temple is one of the 12 Jyotirlinga shrines, where Shiva is worshipped in the form of a Jyotirlinga, meaning "pillar of light". It is also one of the 275 Paadal Petra Sthalam temples and is glorified in hymns by the three of the most revered Nayanar saints (7th century Saivite saints), Appar, Sundarar, and Tirugnana Sambandar. The temple in its current structure was built during the 12th century by Pandya Dynasty. The temple has the longest corridor among all Hindu temples in India. The breadth of these columned corridors varies from 17 to 21 ft (5.2 to 6.4 m) with a height of 25 ft (7.6 m). Each pillar is sculpted in Nayak style as in Madurai Meenakshi Amman Temple. The contribution of the kings of the Sethupathy dynasty (17th century) to the temple was considerable. Large amount of money was spent during the tenure of Pradani Muthirulappa Pillai towards the restoration of the pagodas which were falling into ruins – the Chockattan Mantapam or the cloistered precincts of the temple was reconstructed by him. The rulers of Sri Lanka contributed to the temple – Parakrama Bahu (1153–1186 CE) was involved in the construction of the sanctum sanctorum of the temple. The eastern tower and shrine of Nataraja were built by Dalavai Sethupathy in 1649 CE. The second enclosure is ascribed to Chinna Udayar Sethupathy and his son Ragunatha Thirumalai (1500–1540 CE). The third enclosure was constructed by Muthu Ramalinga Sethupathy (1725–1771 CE) – his statue is located in the entrance of the corridor.

=== Temple tanks ===
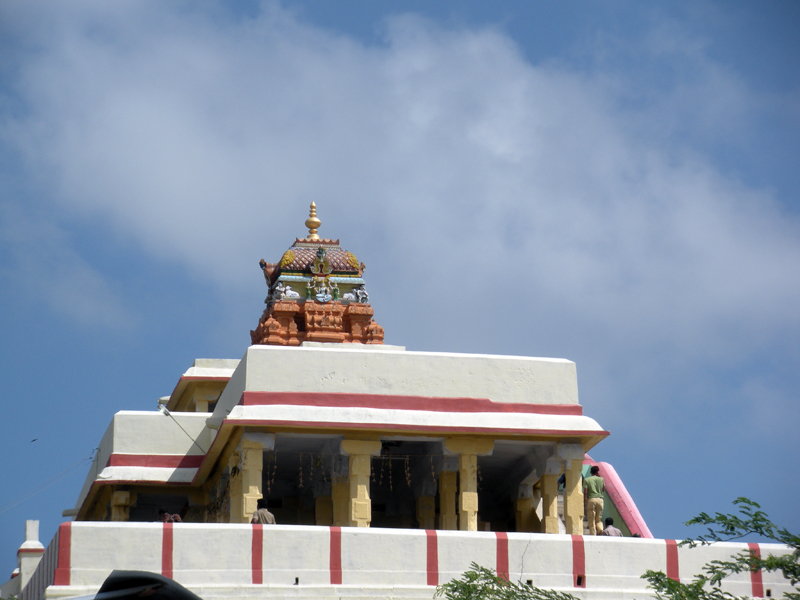
Kothandaramar Temple, Rameswaram

There are sixty-four Tīrthas or Tirthams (holy water bodies) in and around Rameswaram. According to the Skanda Purana, twenty-four of them are important. Of the 24, 14 are in the form of tanks and wells within the precincts of the temple. Bathing in these tanks is a major aspect of the pilgrimage to Rameswaram and is considered equivalent to penance. Twenty-two of the tanks are within the Ramanathaswamy Temple. The foremost one is called Agni Tirtham, the sea (Bay of Bengal). Jatayu, a vulture/eagle demigod, is believed to have fought in vain with the rakshasa-king Ravana to save Sita, and is said to have fallen down at Jatayu Tirtham, as his wings were severed. Villoondi Tirtham literally translates to 'buried bow', is located around 7 km (4.3 mi) from the main temple on the way to Pamban. It is believed to be the place where Rama quenched the thirst of Sita by dipping the bow into the sea water. Other major holy bodies are Hanuman Tirtham, Sugriva Tirtham, and Lakshmana Tirtham.

=== Gandhamathana Parvatham ===
Gandhamathan Parvatham, a hillock situated 3 km (1.9 mi) to the north of the temple is the highest point in the island. In a two-storeyed hall, Rama's feet are venerated by adherents as an imprint on a chakra (wheel). The Ramarpatham Temple is located on the hillock.

=== Dhanushkodi ===
Dhanushkodi is the southernmost tip of the island and houses the Kothandaramaswamy Temple dedicated to Rama. Though Dhanushkodi was washed away during the 1964 cyclone, the temple alone remained intact. It is 18 km (11 mi) way from the centre of the town and can be reached by road. According to local tradition, Dhanushkodi is the site where Vibhishana, a brother of Ravana, surrendered to Rama in the epic Ramayana.

=== Hindu pilgrimage ===
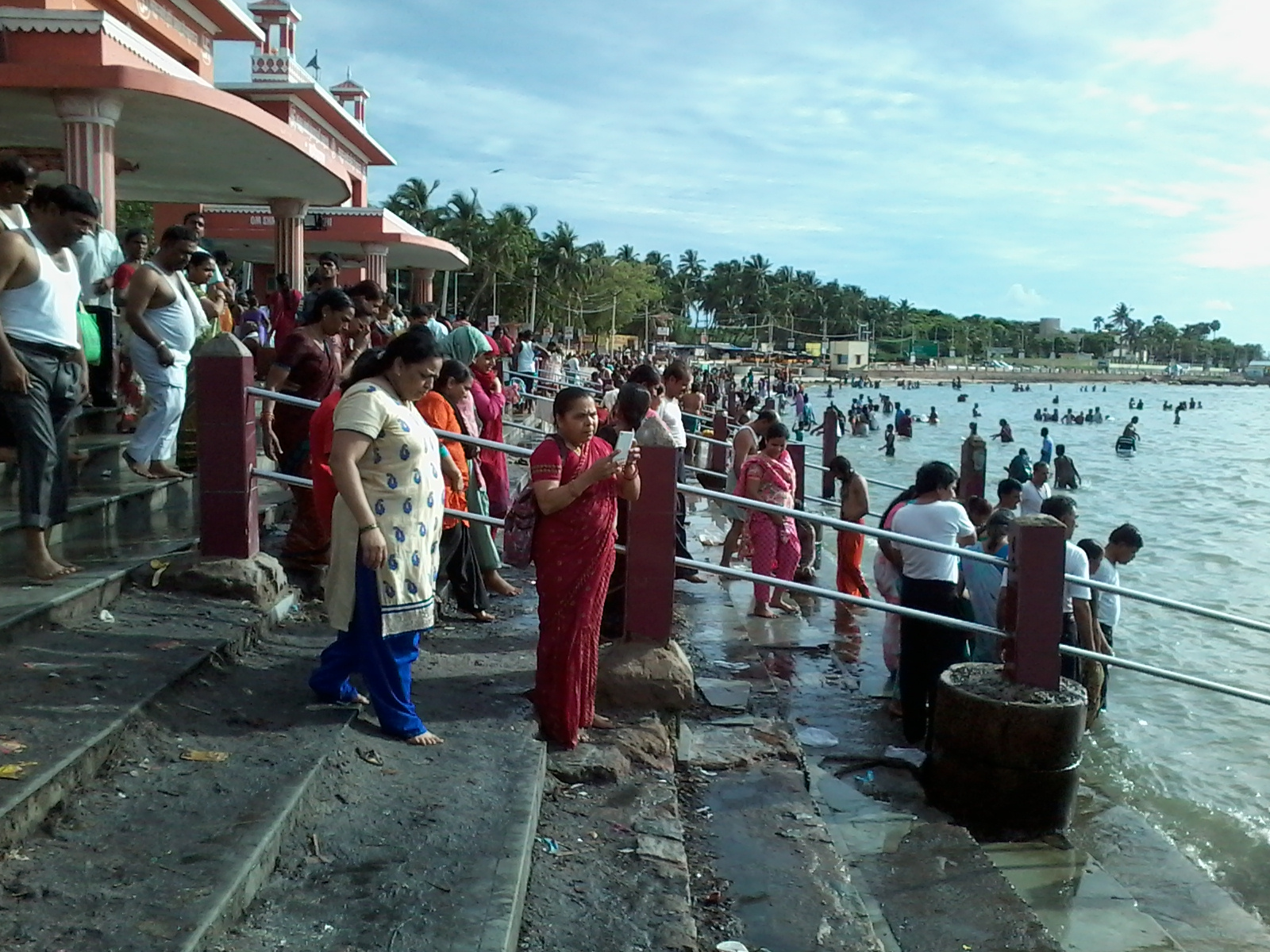
People taking a holy dip in Agni Tirtham, Bay of Bengal

Rameswaram is significant for many Hindus as a pilgrimage to Varanasi is considered to be incomplete without a pilgrimage to Rameswaram. The town along with the Ramanathaswamy temple is one of the holiest Hindu Char Dham (four divine sites) sites comprising Badrinath, Puri, and Dwarka. Though the origins are not clearly known, the Advaita school of Hinduism established by Sankaracharya, attributes the origin of Char Dham to the seer. The four monasteries are located across the four corners of India and their attendant temples are Badrinath Temple at Badrinath in the North, Jagannath Temple at Puri in the East, Dwarakadheesh Temple at Dwarka in the West and Ramanathaswamy Temple at Rameswaram in the South. Though ideologically the temples are divided between the sects of Hinduism, namely Shaivism and Vaishnavism, the Char Dham pilgrimage is an all Hindu affair. The journey across the four cardinal points in India is considered sacred by Hindus who aspire to visit these temples once in their lifetime. Traditionally, the trip starts at the eastern end from Puri, proceeding in clockwise direction in a manner typically followed for circumambulation in Hindu temples. The temple is one of the famous pilgrimage sites historically – the Maratha kings who ruled Thanjavur established chatrams or rest houses all through Mayiladuthurai and Rameswaram between 1745 and 1837 CE and donated them to the temple.

== Interaction with Sri Lanka ==
Rameswaram is frequently in the headlines over fishermen issues like attack, arrest and alleged harassment by Sri Lankan navy for alleged cross border activities, Sethusamudram canal project, Kachchatheevu, Sri Lankan Tamil refugees and also on intercountry smuggling between India and Sri Lanka. As an initial step to curb enhanced smuggling, the Tamil Nadu government has set up 30 more marine police stations to bring the state's entire coastal belt under close vigil.

=== Sri Lankan Tamil refugees ===
During the intense civil war of Sri Lanka, post 1980, Rameswaram acted as one of the focal points of smuggling and intense patrolling was carried out during the period. There are a total of 65,940 registered destitute Sri Lankan refugees dwelling in 129 refugee camps situated in different parts of Tamil Nadu, as of April 2000, and a majority of them enter via Rameswaram. There are an additional 20,667 non-camp refugees who entered via Rameswaram, registered in Mandapam transit camp and opted to reside outside the camps in various parts of Tamil Nadu. On 11 March 1990, a record number of 2,337 refugees in 38 boats arrived from Talaimannar in Sri Lanka to Rameswaram – this was the largest number of refugees arriving in a single day since the ethnic violence from July 1983. As of October 2006, an estimated 200,000 refugees have been reported in Mandapam Camp. Sivarasan, one of the mastermind behind the Assassination of Rajiv Gandhi, the ex-prime minister of India registered as refugee in Rameswaram camp on 12 September 1990.

=== Rameswaram fishery ===
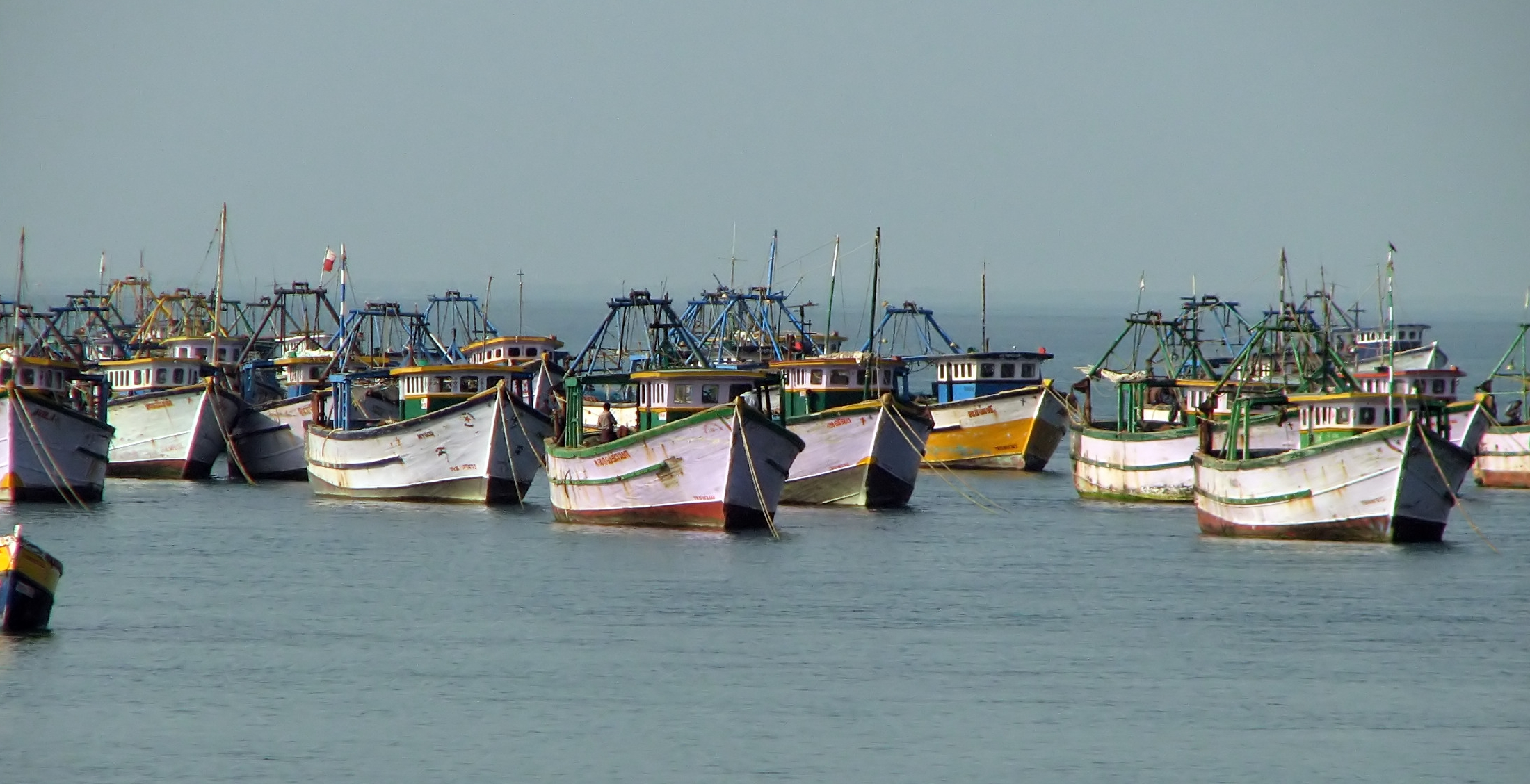
Fishing boats in Rameswaram

Being an island, a significant population is involved in fishery traditionally. There have been incremental cases of Rameswaram fishermen allegedly killed or arrested by Sri Lankan navy along the maritime borders of India and Sri Lanka from the time of Sri Lankan civil war during 1983. In the face of simmering tension after the 1985 January Colombo bound Yaldevi train attack in which 22 Sri Lankan soldiers and 16 civilians were killed, Rameswaram fishermen dared to venture to seas spelling acute hardship for the 10,000 fishermen family. An estimated 381 fishermen have been killed in the sea due to shoot outs from 1983 to 2009. The Sri Lankan army attributed the killings to the Liberation Tigers of Tamil Eelam (LTTE), but the casualty continues even after the end of LTTE in the region. The Tamil Nadu state government has increased the compensation of casualty from the original ₹ 100,000 to 500,000 (US$1,800 to $9,000). There has not been a single prosecution in any of the 381 killings committed so far from the Indian judiciary. The cases not being filed is attributed to the fact that people killed beyond the maritime boundary of India are not eligible for compensation and not many file complaints against the Sri Lankan navy. Though the Indian judiciary has provisions to prosecute foreigners, there is little progress due to the diplomatic overheads involved. Indian government has also ventured into the use of technology like use of Global Positioning System (GPS) by the fishermen and enabling cellphone blips to alert their mobile phones whenever they are crossing into Sri Lankan waters. The Sri Lankan navy has confirmed reports on Indian fishermen risking the international boundary due to depleted catch in Indian waters.

There is a yearly 45-day ban on fishery with motorboats in the region. The fishing ban for the year 2012 was effective during the months of April–May. The jetty at Rameswaram is the largest landing centre for fishing boats in the region and it usually comes alive after the ban, with the arrival of fishermen, boat captains, shore workers and others from their native places.

Sea World Aquarium is a natural habitat lying opposite to the Rameswaram Bus Stand, having an assortment of underwater creatures – it is the only one of its kind in the state, filled with such varied marine life forms including exotic species.

=== Kachchatheevu ===
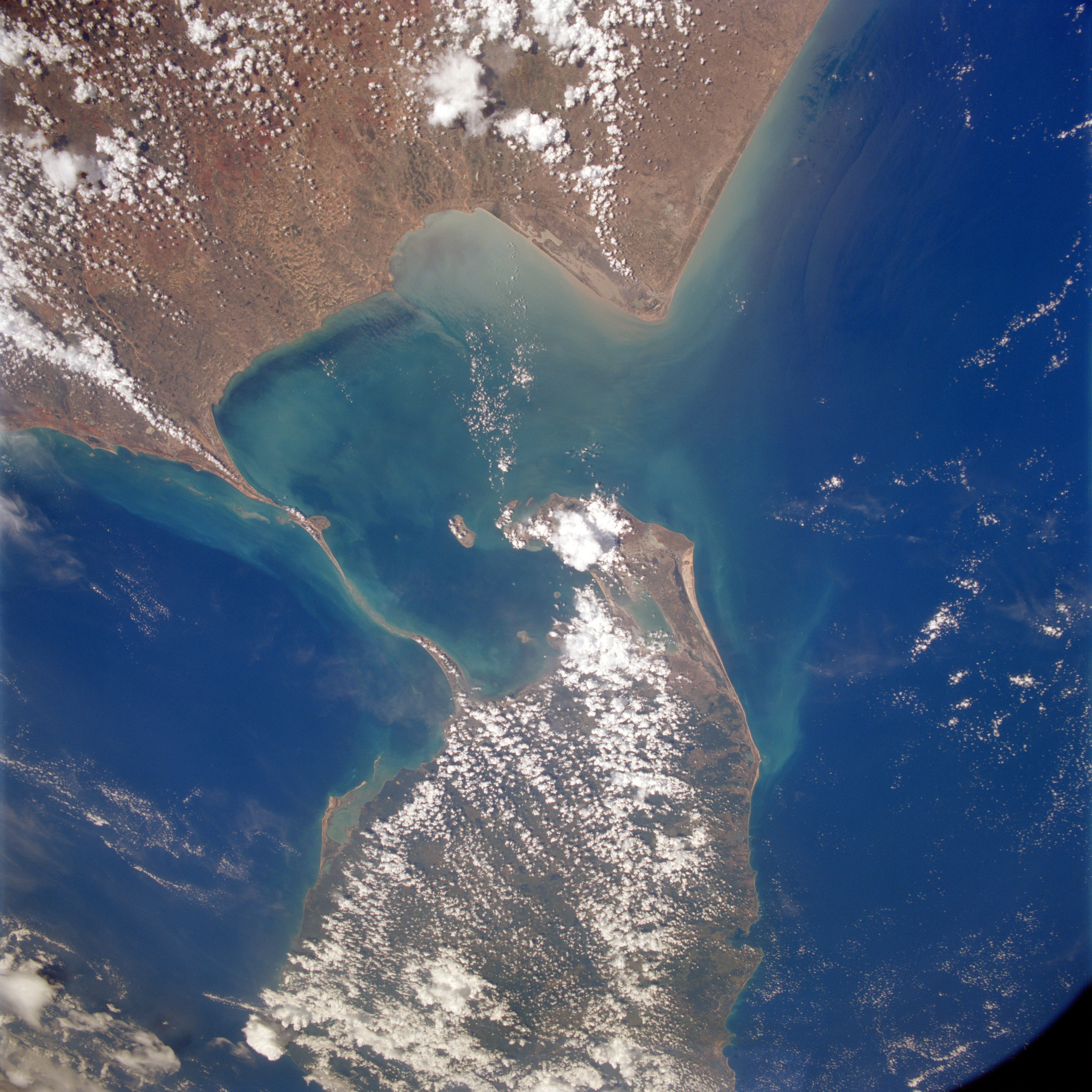
NASA satellite photo: Rameswaram on top, Sri Lanka at the bottom of the photo

Another focal point on the simmering tension between Indian and Sri Lankan governments is over the use of Kachchatheevu, an uninhabited island 15 km (9.3 mi) north of Rameswaram, belonging to Sri Lanka. The accord of 1974 allows fishermen of both the countries for resting and soaking the nets in the island. Repeated allegations on attacks by the Lankan navy, which on many occasions killed Indian fishermen, prevented them from making it to the island. The annual two-day Saint Anthony fest at the island draws huge number of people from the fishermen community of both the countries. The number of pilgrims for the 2012 function crossed 4,000, the largest attendance in the past two decades. The feast also provides an opportunity for the Indian fishermen to meet their Sri Lankan counterparts and exchange views on their mutual problems. The event served as a meeting point to find brides and grooms from both countries, but this practice has now been stopped from the 90s due to political constraint of fishermen family living in different countries.

=== Sethusamudram Canal Project ===
Sethusamudram Shipping Canal Project proposes linking the Palk Bay and the Gulf of Mannar between India and Sri Lanka by creating a shipping canal through the shallow sea sometimes called Setu Samudram, and through the chain of islands variously known as Ram Setu or the Rama's Bridge. A few organisations are opposing the dredging of Rama Setu on religious, environmental and economical grounds. Many of these parties and organisations support implementation of this project using one of the five alternative alignments considered earlier without damaging the structure considered sacred by Hindus. With 22 km (14 mi) of dredging remaining, the project is held from March 2010 by a Supreme Court order seeking the Central Government to clarify the status of the bridge as a national monument.

== Notable people ==
- A. P. J. Abdul Kalam (1931–2015) – former President of India (2002–2007), Ex-secretary of Defence Research and Development Organisation (DRDO), Prime minister's chief scientific advisor, Indian Space Research Organisation (ISRO) scientist and Bharat Ratna recipient.

== See also ==
- Coral reefs in India
