= Palk Strait =

Strait between India and Sri Lanka

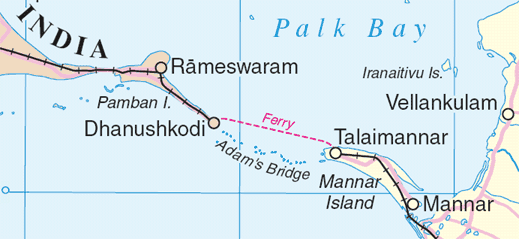
- Palk Strait separating Palk Bay from the Gulf of Mannar

- Location within India

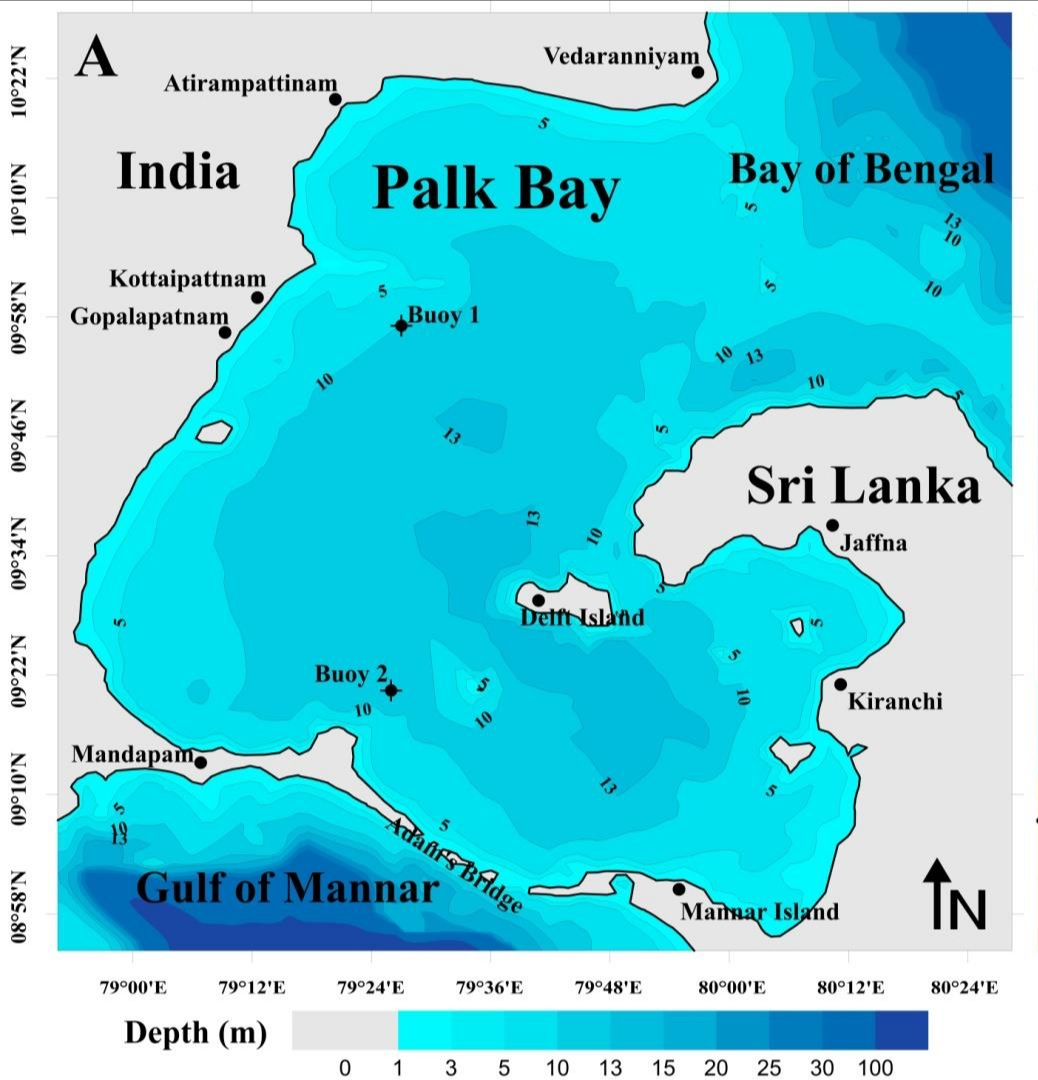
- Bathymetry of the Palk Strait, with water depth in metres
- Location: Bay of Bengal–Laccadive Sea
- Coordinates: 10°00′N 79°45′E
- Type: Strait
- Etymology: Robert Palk
- Basin countries: India, Sri Lanka
- Max. length: 137 km (85 mi)
- Max. width: 137 km (85 mi)
- Min. width: 64 km (40 mi)
- Max. depth: 35 m (115 ft)
- Settlements: Rameswaram; Jaffna

Palk Strait is a strait between Pamban Island in the Indian state of Tamil Nadu and Mannar Island in the Northern Province of Sri Lanka. It links the Bay of Bengal to the Laccadive Sea. It is bound by a chain of low-lying islands and shoals that are collectively called Ram Setu (Adam's Bridge) on one side and the Gulf of Mannar on the other side. The Palk Bay forms the south-western part of the strait. It stretches for about 137 km (85 mi) and is 64 to 137 km (40 to 85 mi) wide. It is named after Robert Palk, who was a governor of Madras (1755–1763) during the British Raj.

Several rivers including the Vaigai flow into the strait. The shallow waters in the strait and the presence of many small islands and reefs make it difficult for large ships to pass through, although fishing boats and small craft navigate the waters. Dredging the sea to make it deeper for navigation and plans for a bridge over the waters have been proposed.

== Geography ==
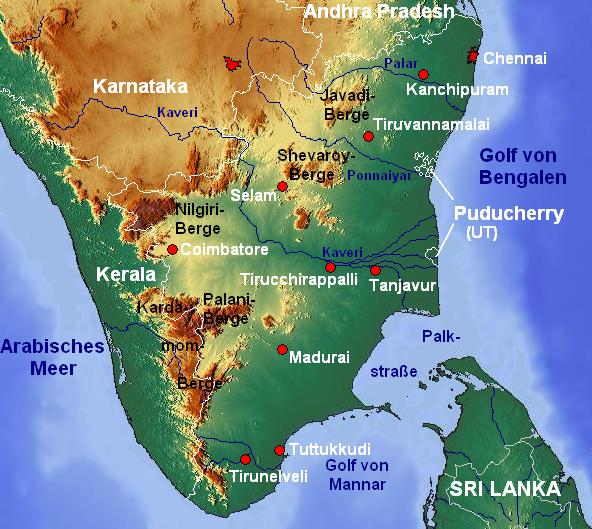
Gulf of Mannar

The Palk strait extends between Pamban Island in the southeastern tip of the Indian state of Tamil Nadu and Mannar Island in the Northern Province of Sri Lanka. It connects the Bay of Bengal in the north to the Laccadive Sea. It is bound by a chain of low lying islands and shoals that are collectively called Ram Setu (Adam's Bridge), on one side and the Gulf of Mannar on the other side. As per the Hindu epic Ramayana, the shoals were part of a bridge that was purportedly constructed by the vanara army of Rama to rescue Rama's wife Sita from the Asura king Ravana.

The Palk Bay forms the south-western part of the strait. It stretches for about 137 km (85 mi) and is 64 to 137 km (40 to 85 mi) wide. Several rivers including the Vaigai flow into the strait. The strait is relatively shallow with the region around the shoals typically around 1–3 m (3 ft 3 in – 9 ft 10 in) deep, while the central part of the strait is typically around 20 m (66 ft) deep. The strait reaches a maximum depth of 35 m (115 ft).

== Geology ==
Due to lowered sea levels during the Last Glacial Period (115,000-11,700 years Before Present) where sea levels reached a maximum of 120 m (390 ft) below present values, the entirety of the relatively shallow strait was exposed as dry land. Following the rise to present sea levels during the Holocene, by around 7,000 years ago, the strait became submerged. The waves around it, to its north and south are of high contrast. To the north, the waves in the Bay of Bengal are mostly swells while that on the south, in the Palk Bay, the waves are mostly smaller wind waves. The significant wave heights is relatively low with an average of around 0.5 m (1 ft 8 in) close to the Ram Setu.

== Transport and navigation ==
The shallow waters and reefs make it difficult for large ships to pass through, although fishing boats and small craft navigate the waters. Dredging the strait to make it deeper for navigation and plans for a bridge over the waters have been proposed. Construction of a shipping channel through the strait was first proposed to the British government of India in 1860, and a number of commissions have studied the proposal. The latest of these was the Sethusamudram Shipping Canal Project, commissioned by the Government of India in 2005. However, the plan encountered opposition on religious grounds.

The Pamban Island is linked to the Indian mainland by the Pamban Bridge, which was opened for traffic on 24 February 1914. A new railway bridge was completed near the old Pamban Bridge in 2024 after rail transportation on the old bridge was suspended permanently in February 2023 due to concerns on stability of the bridge. An adjacent road bridge was opened in 1988. Trains used to traverse from Madras to Dhanushkodi at the southern tip of the Pamban island and a ferry connected to Talaimannar on the Mannar Island, before a train carried passengers to Colombo. The railway line to Dhanushkodi was destroyed during 1964 Dhanushkodi cyclone along with the Pamban-Dhanuskodi passenger train, killing around 200 people. The ferry service continued till the 1970s between Rameswaram and Talaimannar, but was discontinued by the Indian Government in 1984.

The Palk Strait Bridge is a proposed undersea tunnel and bridge linking India and Sri Lanka. It was first discussed in 2002, and has been examined several times since.

== See also ==
- Andaman Sea
- Coral reefs in India
- Borders of India
- Exclusive economic zone of India
