= Rameswaram taluk =

Taluk of Ramanathapuram district of Tamil Nadu, India

Population
  - Total: 82,682

Rameswaram Taluk (Tamil: ராமேஸ்வரம் தாலுகா) is a taluk of Ramanathapuram district of the Indian state of Tamil Nadu. Taluk headquarters of the taluk are in Rameswaram. The taluk comprises the whole of Pamban Island.

== Demographics ==
According to the 2011 census, the taluk had a population of 82,682 with 41,995 males and 40,687 females, a ratio of 969 women for every 1000 men. The taluk had a literacy rate of 75.51. Child population in the age group below 6 was 4,561 Males and 4,406 Females.
