= Mainland India =

Region comprising most of India, excluding Northeast and Island regions

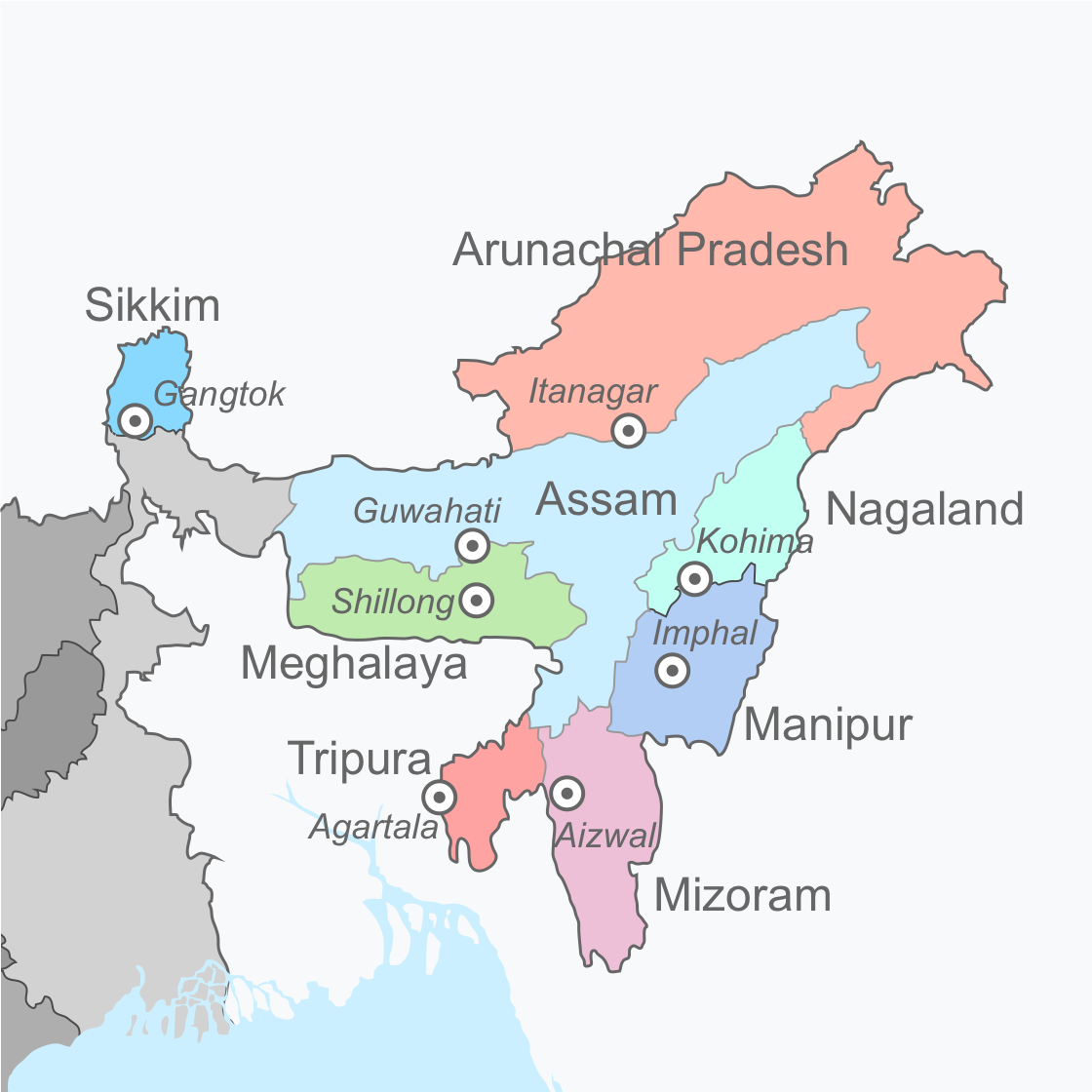
Location of North-eastern States in India (right), Map of Northeast India with states (centre), Map of Island Union Territories of India (left)

Mainland India is a geo-political term sometimes used to refer to India excluding the region of Northeast India, and the union territories of Andaman and Nicobar Islands and Lakshadweep, with the north-east connected by the 21 km (13 mi) wide Siliguri Corridor.

In a geographical context, Mainland India includes the entirety of India (including Northeast India) in continental Asia, excluding islands such as the union territories of Andaman and Nicobar Islands and Lakshadweep.

Overall, Mainland India refers to the rest of India excluding Northeast India and the island union territories.

== Geopolitical term ==
=== History ===
During the colonial era, British officials conceptualised of an "mainland" which was perceived as totally distinct from present-day Northeast India due primarily to racial differences despite millions of "mongoloid" groups also being present in the mainland region.

=== Contemporary ===
Mainland India has been noted for having neglected Northeast India to a significant extent due to the Northeast's distinctness, with the Northeast having become somewhat alienated as a result, the term is used in Northeast India to refer to Indians and Indian cultures outside of Northeast region. The Northeast India and Mainland India are used by Locals in the region.

=== Autonomous Governance in Northeast India ===
The Sixth Schedule to the Constitution of India provides measures of autonomy and self-governance to the Scheduled Tribes in the hill regions of Northeast India. This provision distinguishes the region from other parts of India in terms of governance.

== See also ==
- Geography of India
- List of islands of India, considered distinct from mainland India
- Indian Himalayan Region, including non-mainland India
- China proper
