= Pamban Lighthouse =

Lighthouse in Pamban Island, India

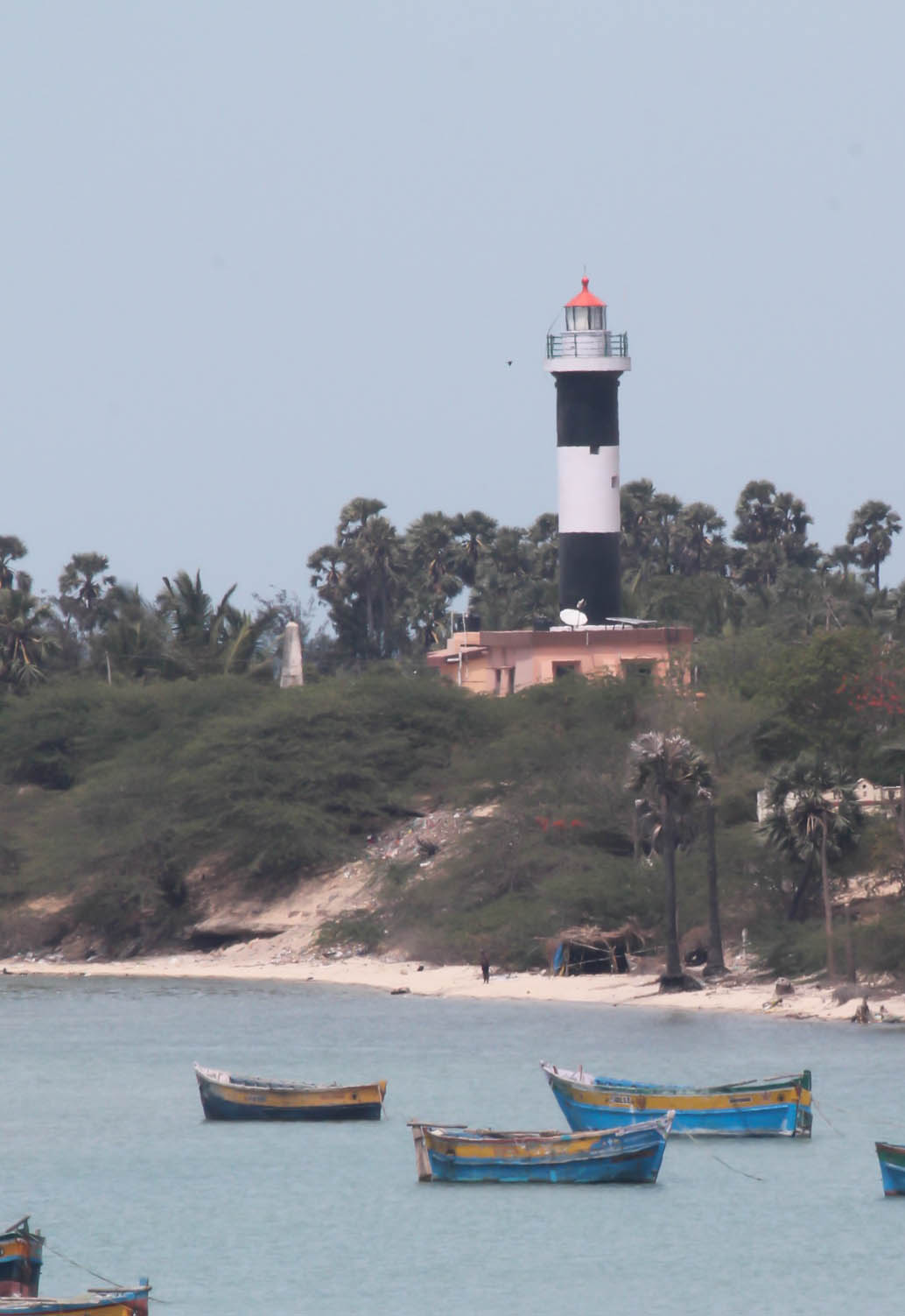
- Pamban Lighthouse
- Location: Pamban Island, Tamil Nadu, India
- Coordinates: 9.288145°N 79.218554°E

Tower
- Constructed: 1845 (first)
- Construction: masonry tower
- Height: 20 m (66 ft)
- Shape: cylindrical tower with balcony and lantern
- Markings: white and black bands tower, white lantern, red roof

Light
- First lit: 1879 (current)
- Focal height: 29 m (95 ft)
- Characteristic: Fl (3) W 9s.

The Pamban Lighthouse is a lighthouse on the Pamban Island in the Indian state of Tamil Nadu. The original tower commissioned in 1846 was 41 ft (12 m) tall and used coconut oil based wick lamps. The current 66 ft (20 m)-high tower was constructed in 1902 into a 66-foot cylindrical tower with a fourth order Fresnel lens. The lighthouse served as a navigational aid for ships transiting the Pamban canal. It was modernized in 2019, and features a solar powered LED-based flash lamp, along with satellite-based communication and response systems.

== History ==
The Pamban Lighthouse was first commissioned on 21 April 1846, with a 41-foot brick-and-lime tower using coconut-oil wick lamps and parabolic reflectors. In 1860, the tower was raised and fitted with a 4th-order dioptric lens and later upgraded in 1902 with an occulting optic. During this time, it was reconstructed into 66-foot cylindrical tower in 1902 to aid navigation through the Pamban Canal during British rule. An acetylene gas flasher was installed in 1923, emitting three quick flashes every 9 seconds. It was handed over to the central government in 2004 from the Tamil Nadu Maritime Board. The lighthouse was modernized in 2019 with a Sabik LED 160 HW flasher emitting one white flash every 5 seconds.

== Structure ==
Pamban Lighthouse was originally constructed in 1845, comprising a cylindrical tower with a balcony and lantern. It is located at 9°17.2' N latitude and 79°13.3' E longitude, occupying a land area of about 0.47 hectares, enclosed by a masonry compound wall. The lighthouse stands at 66 ft (20 m) tall, with a focal height of 95 ft (29 m) providing three white flashes every 9 seconds. The lighthouse features a 15 m high circular masonry tower painted in black and white horizontal bands. Its focal height is 29 m above mean sea level, offering a range of 15 nautical miles. The light system includes a 1.5 m lantern room, powered by mains electricity, solar panels (3 × 500 Wp), and a 15 kVA diesel generator. Emergency systems use 600 Ah Exide batteries. The site also includes RACON, DGPS, AIS base stations, and CCTV surveillance for navigational and operational efficiency. It is located in the northwest point of the Pamban channel.

The lighthouse is now equipped with a solar-powered, laser-like fixed beam that illuminates in all directions simultaneously, unlike rotating beams of traditional lighthouses. It can receive and transmit messages via satellites and can broadcast messages to GPS-equipped ships and vehicles. It has a distress signal response capability, guiding vessels during rough sea conditions. The lighthouse was highly useful for the fishing community, improving navigation and safety.

== See also ==
- List of lighthouses in India
