= Indian-Sri Lankan =

Indian-Sri Lankan or Sri Lankan-Indian may refer to:

- As an adjective, anything relating to India – Sri Lanka relations
- Indians in Sri Lanka
- Indian Tamils of Sri Lanka
- Sri Lankans in India
- Sri Lankan Tamils in India
