= List of Indians in Sri Lanka =

This is a list of Indians in Sri Lanka. The list includes notable people from multiple different ethnicities, as well as people native to India who are living in or notable in Sri Lanka.

There is also large number of Sinhalese identifying Sri Lankans of Indian descent, such as the Karava, Durava, Salagama castes and Demalagattara

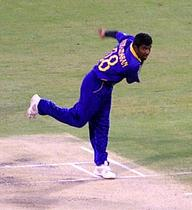
Muthiah Muralidaran, popular Sri Lankan cricketer of Indian Tamil descent

== Politicians ==
- S. W. R. D. Bandaranaike - Sri Lankan Prime Minister, Founder of Sinhalese Nationalist Sri Lanka Freedom Party (Indian Tamil)
- Nirj Deva – British politician and former MP
- Mano Ganesan – prominent human rights activist and politician (Indian Tamil)
- Hanif Yusuf - 12th Governor of Western Province (Gujarati)
- K. Natesa Iyer – Sri Lankan pre-independence politician (Indian Tamil)
- J. R. Jayewardene - 1st Executive President of Sri Lanka (Colombo Chetty)
- Chandrika Kumaratunga - Sri Lankan President, daughter of S. W. R. D. Bandaranaike. (Indian Tamil)
- M.G. Ramachandran – Sri Lankan-born Indian politician, Governor of Tamil Nadu and actor. (Malayali)
- Arumugan Thondaman – Sri Lankan politician, son of Savumiamoorthy Thondaman (Indian Tamil)
- Savumiamoorthy Thondaman – Sri Lankan politician, patriarch of the Thondaman political family (Indian Tamil)
- Jeevan Thondaman - Sri Lankan politician, son of Arumugan Thondaman (Indian Tamil)
- Jeyaraj Fernandopulle – Sri Lankan politician (Colombo Chetty)

== Artists ==
- Ramaya Muttusamy - Prolific Singer and Music in Director (Indian Tamil)
- Rukmani Devi – actress and singer (Colombo Chetty)
- Mohideen Baig - famous singer (Tamil Nadu Pathans)
- M. K. Rocksamy - Composer (Goan Tamil)

== Sports ==
- Muthiah Muralidaran – Sri Lanka international spin bowler; world record holder for most wickets taken in Test cricket
- Roy Dias – former cricket captain (Colombo Chetty)

== Businesspeople ==
- Mahesh Amalean – engineer, industrialist and chairman of MAS Holdings
- Reggie Candappa – founder and chairman of Grant McCann Erickson (Colombo Chetty)
- Neela Marikkar – Chairperson of Grant McCann Erickson (Colombo Chetty)
- Christopher Ondaatje – OC, CBE, Sri Lankan-Canadian businessman, philanthropist, adventurer, writer and Olympian (Colombo Chetty)

== Authors ==
- Michael Ondaatje – OC, Sri Lankan Canadian novelist and poet, perhaps best known for his Booker Prize winning novel adapted into an Academy Award-winning film, The English Patient

== Lawyers ==
- Gritakumar E. Chitty – Sri Lankan First Registrar and Secretary-General of International Tribunal for the Law of the Sea (retired) (Colombo Chetty)

== Others ==
- Kottarapattu Chattu Kuttan - famous Doorman at Galle Face Hotel (Malayali)

== Karava, Demalagattara and Kshatriya Solar Dynasty ==
- Rohana Wijeweera - Activist, Militant and found of Janatha Vimukthi Peramuna
- Chaminda Vaas - Sri Lankan Cricketer
- Dayasritha Tissera - Sri Lankan politician
- Arnolis Weerasooriya (1854-1888), first Ceylonese Colonel, and Sinhalese member of the Salvation Army
- Channa Weerasuriya, Sri Lankan army officer
- Risira Weerasuriya (born 2000), Sri Lankan cricketer
- Sri Piyaratana Tissa Mahanayake Thero (1826-1907) - Mahanayaka Thero of the Amarapura Nikaya (circa 1860s), and the Sanganayake of the Southern Province
- Srilal Weerasooriya (born 1943), 15th Commander of the Sri Lankan Army and a former Sri Lankan High Commissioner to Pakistan
- Tilak Weerasooriya (1967-2022), Sri Lankan Physician & Academic

Usurpers of the Sri Lankan throne

- Ellalan
- The Five Dravidians
- Kalinga Magha
- Parakrama Pandya
- Sena and Guttika
- The Six Dravidians

Indian dynasty of the Kingdom of Kandy

- Nayaks of Kandy

== See also ==
- List of Sri Lankans by ethnicity
