= Sri Lankan Tamils in India =

Ethnic group

Total population
- Hundreds of Thousands

Regions with significant populations
- Tamil Nadu: ~123,000
- Kerala: ~7000
- Pondicherry: ~500
- Karnataka: ~35,000

Languages
- Tamil, Sinhala, English

Religion
- Hindu (Saivite), Roman Catholic and Protestant Christianity

Related ethnic groups
- Sri Lankan, Indian Tamils, Dravidian

Sri Lankan Tamils in India mainly refer to Tamil people of Sri Lankan origin in India and non-resident Sri Lankan Tamil. They are partly who migrated to India and their descendants and mostly refugees from Sri Lanka because of the concluded Sri Lankan Civil War. In general socio economically they are living below poverty line, except few people who settled in India during early times, rich businessmen, and professionals. In Tamil Nadu they are also known as Ceylon Tamils or Jaffna Tamils.

== History ==
=== Early arrivals ===
During 19th century and early 20th century some Sri Lankan Tamils especially from Jaffna migrated or settled in India for various reasons such as education, employment in the British Indian government, business and other reasons. Among them were Hensman family, who migrated to Chennai from Jaffna during late 19th century.

=== 1960s ===
In 1948, immediately after the country's independence, a controversial law labelled the Ceylon Citizenship Act was passed in the Sri Lankan parliament which deliberately discriminated against the Tamils of South Indian origin, whose ancestors had settled in the country in the 19th and 20th centuries. This act made it virtually impossible for them to obtain citizenship and over 700,000 Tamils (consisting of up to 11% of the country's total population) were made stateless. In 1964, a pact was signed between Bandaranaike and the then Indian Prime minister Lal Bahadur Shastri to repatriate much of the population of the stateless Tamils. Over the next 30 years, successive Sri Lankan governments were actively engaged in deporting over 300,000 Tamils back to India. It wasn't until 2003, after a state-sponsored pogrom against Tamils and a full-scale civil war, that Indian Tamils were granted citizenship but by this time, their population had dwindled to just 5% of the country's population. Tamils repatriated to India were assimilated with location population after taking Indian Citizenships, except a few pockets in Tamil Nadu, where they are still called as Ceylon Tamils.

Most of the Tamils, who were repatriated, settled in various parts of Tamil Nadu, while a few hundred families have settled in Punalur taluk of Kollam district in Kerala, and in Sulya and Puttur taluks of Dakshina Kannada district in Karnataka where a majority of them work in tea and rubber plantations.

=== 1980s ===
Following the events of the Black July riots, and later the outbreak of the Sri Lankan Civil War, tens of thousands Sri Lankan Tamil refugees arrived in Tamil Nadu in four waves. The first wave on 24 July 1983, after Black July, to the 29 July 1987 up until the Indo-Sri Lanka Accord, 134,053 Sri Lankan Tamils arrived in India. The first repatriation took place after the signing of the Indo-Sri Lanka Accord in 1987 and between 24 December 1987 and 31 August 1989, 25,585 refugees and non-camp Sri Lankan nationals returned to Sri Lanka. The second wave began with the start of Eelam War II after 25 August 1989, where 122,000 Sri Lankan Tamils came to Tamil Nadu. On 20 January 1992, after the assassination of Rajiv Gandhi 54,188 refugees were voluntarily repatriated to Sri Lanka, until March 1995. Eelam War III commenced in April 1995 starting the third wave or refugees. By 12 April 2002, nearly 23,356 refugees had come to Tamil Nadu. The flow of refugees had stopped in 2002 because of the cease fire agreement.

== Demographics ==
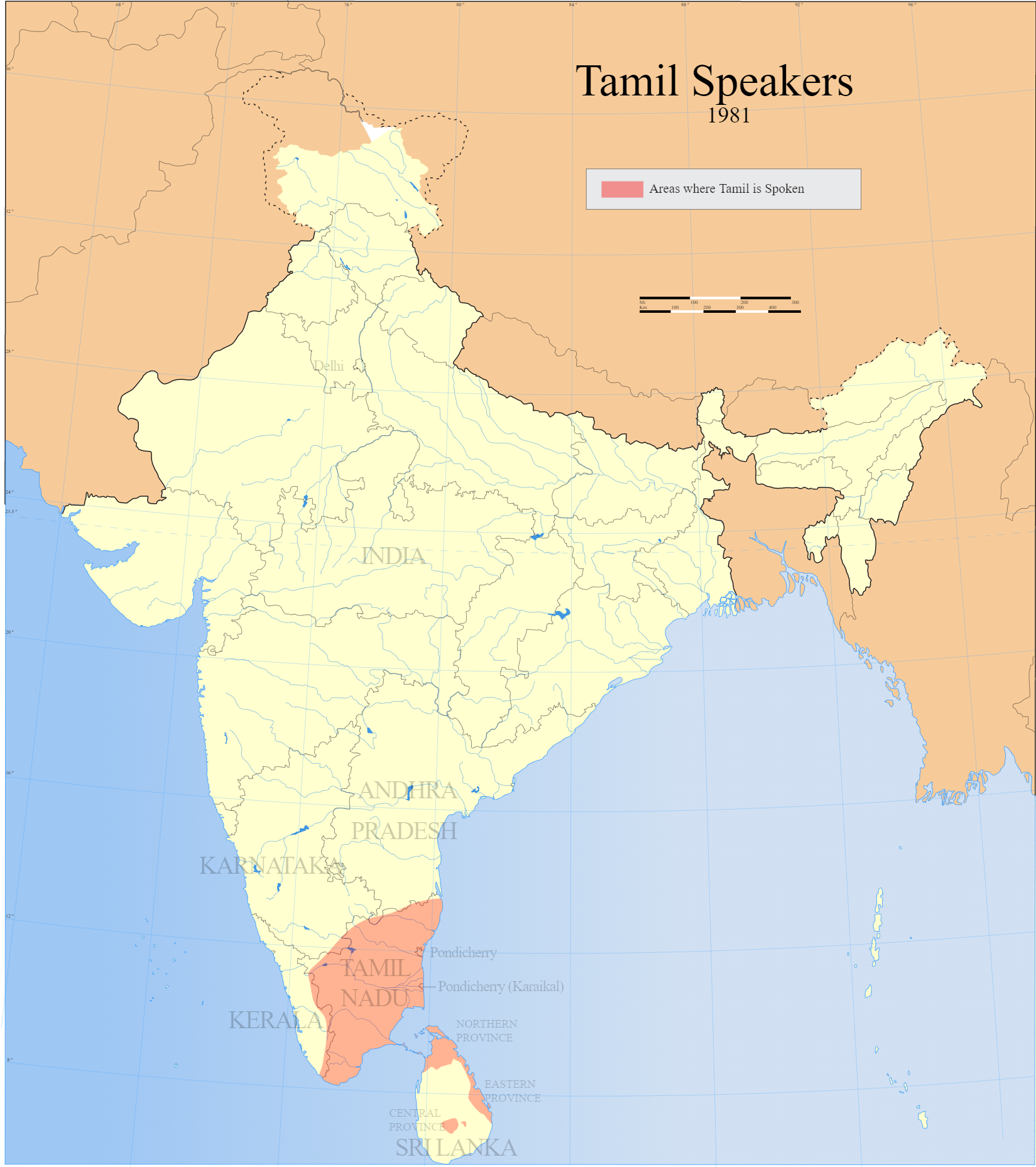
Tamils distribution in Tamil Nadu and Sri Lanka

Sri Lankan Tamils in India number in the hundreds of thousands, mostly in the state of Tamil Nadu, the closest state to Sri Lanka and the easiest to get to. There is also a considerable amount in the state of Kerala with around 700 refugee families. There are also a number of Sri Lankan Tamils in the eastern regions of Orissa, Karnataka and Pondicherry.

Highest number of Sri Lankan Tamil families living in KK Nagar, Thuvakudi in Trichirapalli, Neelankarai, Valasaravakkam in Chennai, Nagercoil in Kanniyakumari, R.S puram, Valparai in Coimbatore.

== Refugees ==
The Sri Lankan Tamil refugees in Tamil Nadu have three different kinds of shelter. The first is the camp refugees or those who took shelter in camps mostly located in the rural areas. They were sent from the Mandapam transit camp to different locations. The second group is non-camp refugees are those living in tented house with relatives and friends without any assistance from the government. Nearly fifty thousand refugees lived outside camps; most of them are staying in big cities. The third group consisted of those who supposedly posed security threats since they were involved in subversive activities in Sri Lanka. They were sent to special camps where they had to live under constant surveillance. These special camps came into existence in 1991.

=== The camps ===
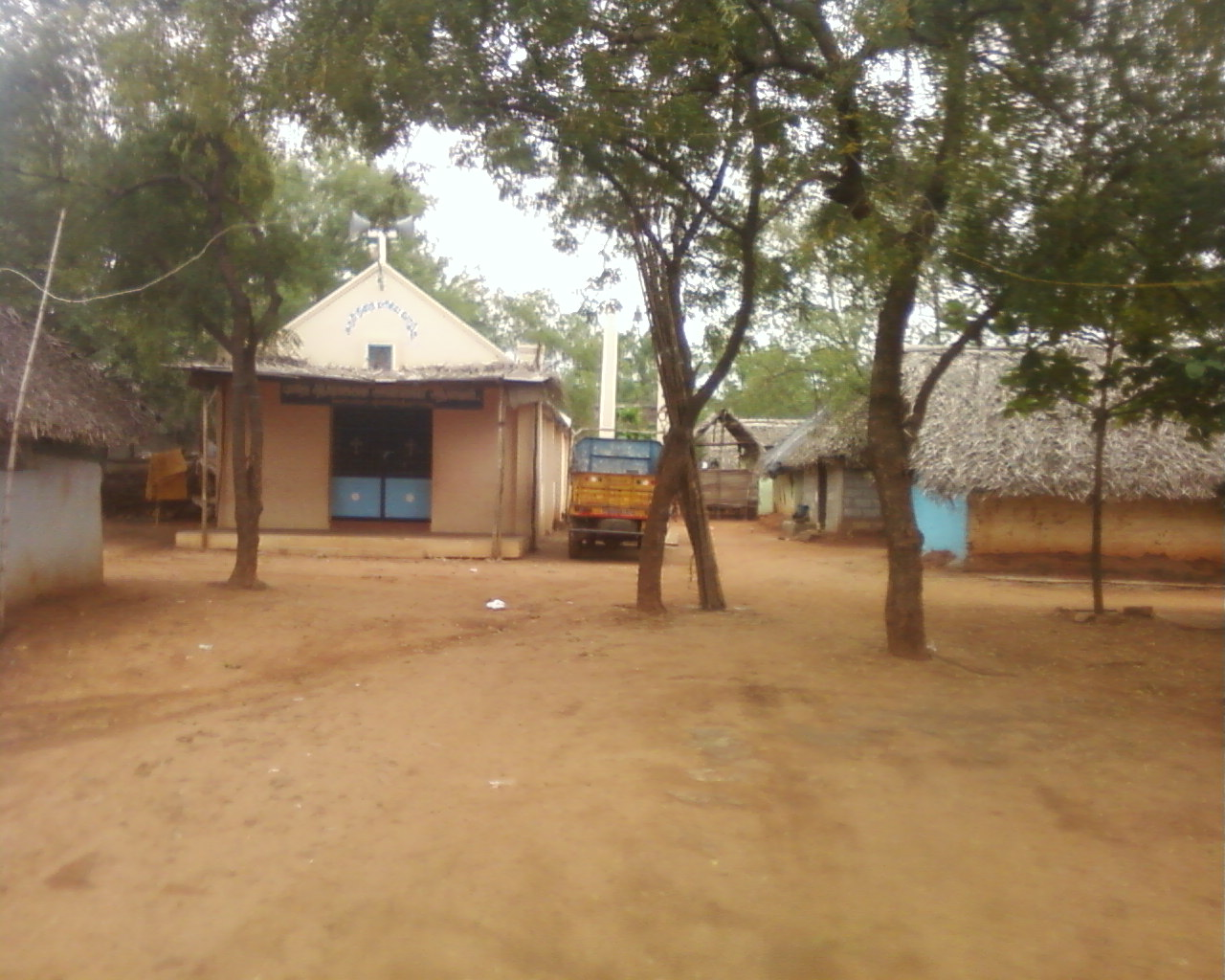
Rajapalayam refugee camp

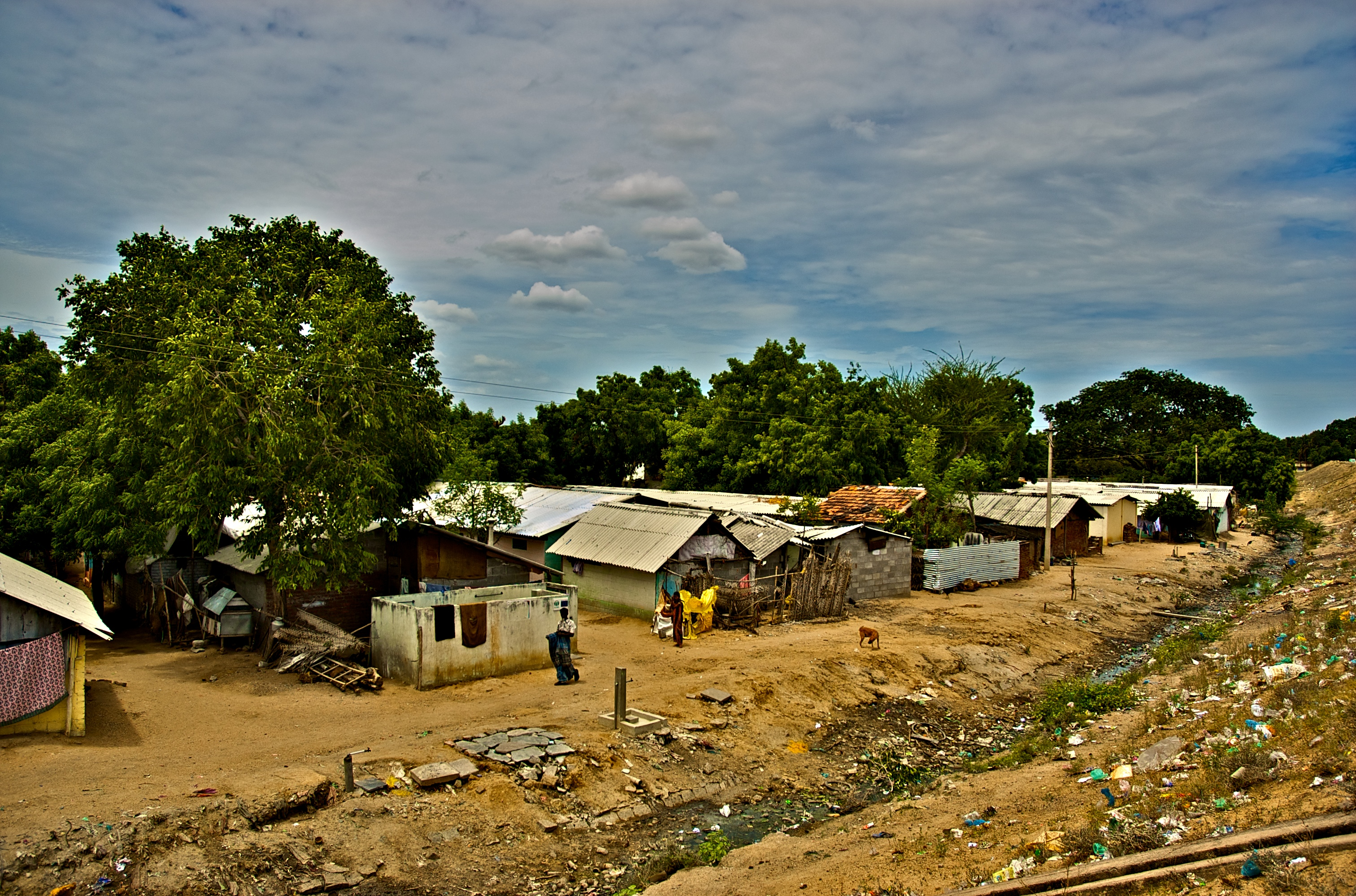
Choking drains next to the refugee camp at Vembakkottai village, Virudhunagar

When the first wave of refugees entered India in 1983, they were divided into three groups. Besides the camp and non-camp refugees, there were the militants in special camps. The Government of Tamil Nadu had to welcome the refugees in the emergency situation. The Indian government did not like to send the refugees to other states because of the language barriers. India's continued refusal to sign protocols and also the ban on NGOs prevent any international help from reaching the refugees. There are nearly 80,000 refugees 132 camps in Tamil Nadu and one in Orissa. All refugee camps are registered. This entitles them to government assistance-cash, shelter, health facilities, clothing and provision of essential items. The refugees from Sri Lanka have been the recipients of one of the most advanced systems of education in the world, but since 1991, this privilege has been withdrawn.

Refugees also have strict restrictions on their freedom of movement and are treated with some degree of suspicion by the Indian government. It is due to the assassination of former Indian Prime minister Rajiv Gandhi in 1991 by a suspected member of the LTTE. After that some refugee camps were moved away from coastal areas to isolated interior regions of Tamil Nadu state so as to prevent contact amongst the refugees belonging to different camps. Refugees also have strict restrictions on their freedom of movement and are treated as third grade citizens. If anyone disobeys the rules, they may have their monthly stipend and rations cut off as punishment. As India has not signed the international convention for refugees, the plight of the Sri Lankan refugees in India is not brought to the scrutiny of the United Nations High Commission for Refugees and no other major human rights organisation has taken note of the suffering of the Tamils languishing in the "special camps" in India.

==== Militant refugees ====
Militant leadership has always been elitist and there is a clear line of distinction between them and the mass of refugees. The leadership drew its support and recruited its forces from the refugee camps. These camps no longer exist. They were all closed down after the assassination of Rajiv Gandhi, but their legacy continues to haunt the refugees.

==== Non-camp refugees ====
These are the refugees who do not receive financial assistance from the government. They are mostly rich businessmen and professionals. Most of the Sri Lankan Tamils lives in the pockets of Chennai, Trichy and Kanyakumari in Tamil Nadu, Trivandrum, Punalur in Kerala.

==== Recent developments ====
Former Tamil Nadu Chief Minister Mr.M.Karunanidhi assured that the Sri Lankan Tamil refugees living in and outside the camps would be granted Indian citizenship soon. Spiritual leader Sri Sri Ravi Shankar has backed Tamil Nadu Chief Minister M. Karunanidhi's call to give Indian citizenship to Sri Lankan Tamil refugees in India.

== Prominent people ==
- V. Kanakasabhai
- Balu Mahendra
- S. C. C. Anthony Pillai was a trade unionist, politician and Indian Member of Parliament.
- H.S.Hensman
- J.E. Hensman
- Mona Hensman
- Major Willie Hensman
- Rohini Hensman
- Raibahadur Williamspillai
- Paul M. Jayarajan aka Marcus Jayarajan Paul
- E. M. V. Naganathan
- Arumuka Navalar
- Donald Rutnam
- E. M. V. Naganathan
- J. K. Rithesh

== See also ==
- List of countries where Tamil is an official language
- Sri Lankan Tamil people
- Sri Lankan Tamil diaspora
- Sri Lankan Tamils in Indian cinema
- List of Sri Lankan Tamils in India
- Sri Lankans in India
- Indian Tamils of Sri Lanka
- UNHCR Representation in India
