= Sreedharan =

Sreedharan is one of the names of the Hindu deity Vishnu. It is used as a male given name in India and the Indian diaspora. People with that name include:

- N. Sreedharan, One of the chief organisers of Communist Party in Central Travancore and former CPI(M) Secretariat Member
- E. Sreedharan, popularly known as metro man, engineer known for heading Delhi Metro and repairing Pamban Bridge
- Kottarakkara Sreedharan Nair, Malayalam actor
- Perumbadavam Sreedharan, Malayalam author
