= Maraikayarpattinam =

- city
- Location in Tamil Nadu, India Maraikayarpattinam (India)
- Coordinates: 9.275°N 79.130°E
- Country: India
- State: Tamil Nadu
- District: Ramanathapuram
- Elevation: 9 m (30 ft)

Languages
  - Official: Tamil
- Time zone: UTC+5:30 (IST)

Maraikayarpattinam is a Panchayat Village near Mandapam in Ramanathapuram district in the Indian state of Tamil Nadu.
