= Kotilingam =

Hindu temple on Andhra Pradesh, India

Kotilingam is a Hindu temple in Rajahmundry City in Andhra Pradesh, India.

Situated close to Panchadharala in Visakhapatnam district, Kotilingam Temple is dedicated to Lord Shiva.

Literally meaning ‘millions of Lingams’, Kotilingam Temple enshrines a Shivling on which are carved other lingams in 12 rows and each row contains 85 lingams.

The temple is noted for its mandapam with astounding pillars. It also bears inscriptions dating back to the 15th century.

Another temple is situated near KGF mines.
