= New Pamban Bridge =

Railway bridge under construction connecting Pamban Island to mainland India

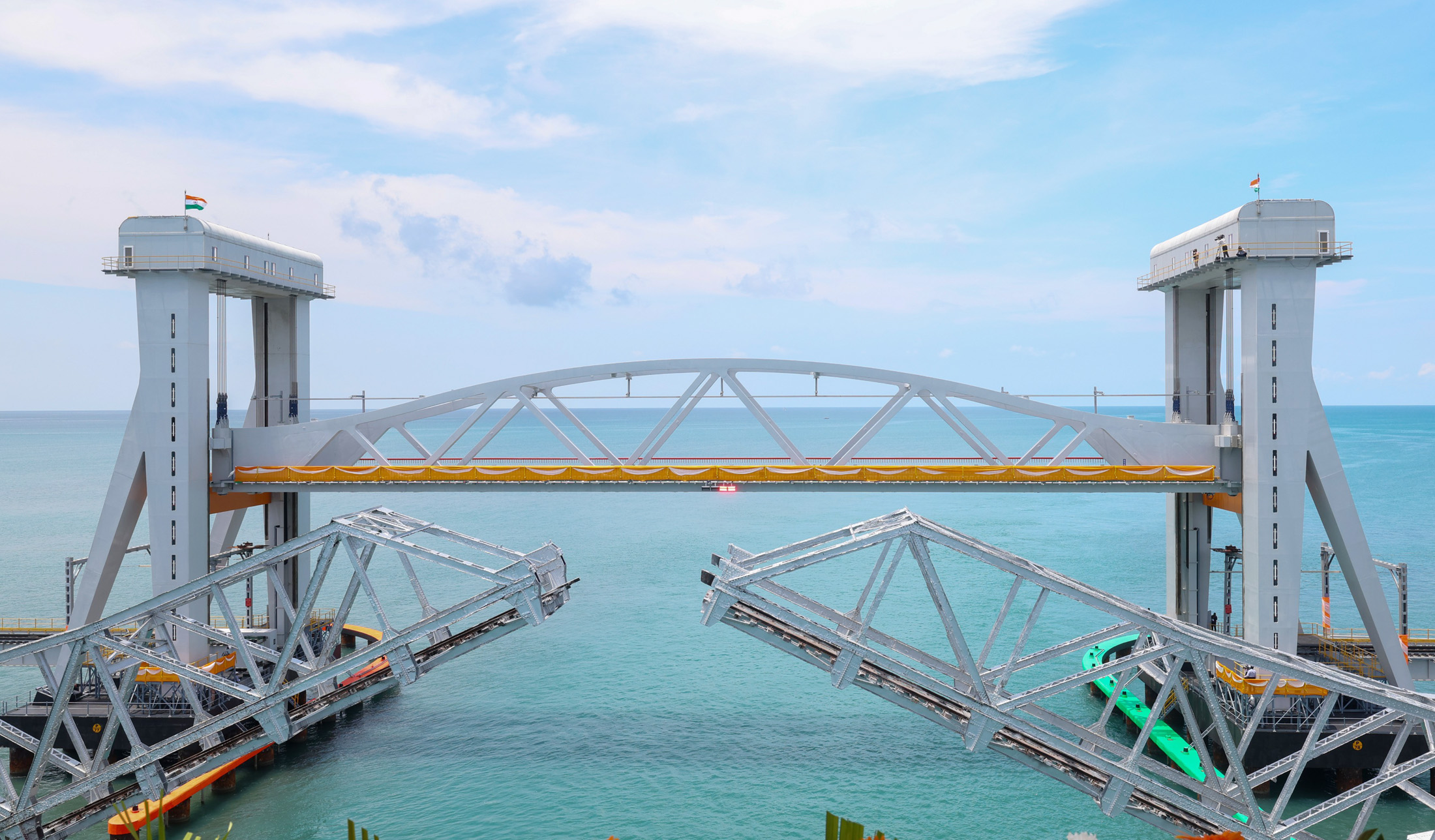
- The vertical lift section of the new Pamban bridge with the bascule section of the old bridge in the foreground
- Coordinates: 9°16′57.25″N 79°12′5.91″E
- Carries: Rail
- Locale: Rameswaram, Tamil Nadu, India
- Owner: Indian Railways

Characteristics
- Total length: 2,070 metres (6,790 ft)
- No. of spans: 100

Rail characteristics
- No. of tracks: 2 (Completed:1)
- Electrified: Yes

History
- Construction start: February 2020
- Construction end: September 2024
- Construction cost: ₹5 billion (US$53 million)
- Opened: 6 April 2025

Location
- Interactive map of New Pamban Bridge

The New Pamban Bridge (pronounced: /pɑːmbən/ romanised: pāmban, (Tamil: [paːmbɐn])) is a vertical lift railway sea bridge that connects the town of Mandapam in mainland India with Rameswaram on Pamban Island. The new bridge is constructed parallel to the old Pamban Bridge opened in 1914 and was planned to replace the same. The bridge stretches across a length of 2.07 km (1.29 mi) and is the first vertical lift sea bridge in India. It consists of 100 spans including a 72 m (236 ft) vertical lifting central section. The construction of the bridge was completed in 2024 and the bridge was opened for traffic in April 2025.

== Background ==
The old Pamban Bridge was opened in February 1914 and carried rail traffic between Rameshwaram in Pamban Island and mainland India. The bridge underwent several overhauls over the years to extend its lifespan. The bridge was damaged in an accident in 2013 and the Ministry of Railways planned to invest ₹25 crore (US$2.7 million) to upgrade the bridge in 2016. In December 2018, fissures developed on the bridge, which halted railway traffic and the Government of India considered building a replacement bridge. In December 2022, rail transportation on the old bridge was suspended permanently as the bascule section had weakened significantly due to corrosion.

== Planning and construction ==
In 2020, Government of India announced that a new railway bridge will be constructed near the old Pamban Bridge at a cost of ₹5 billion (US$53 million). The construction contract was awarded to Rail Vikas Nigam Limited.

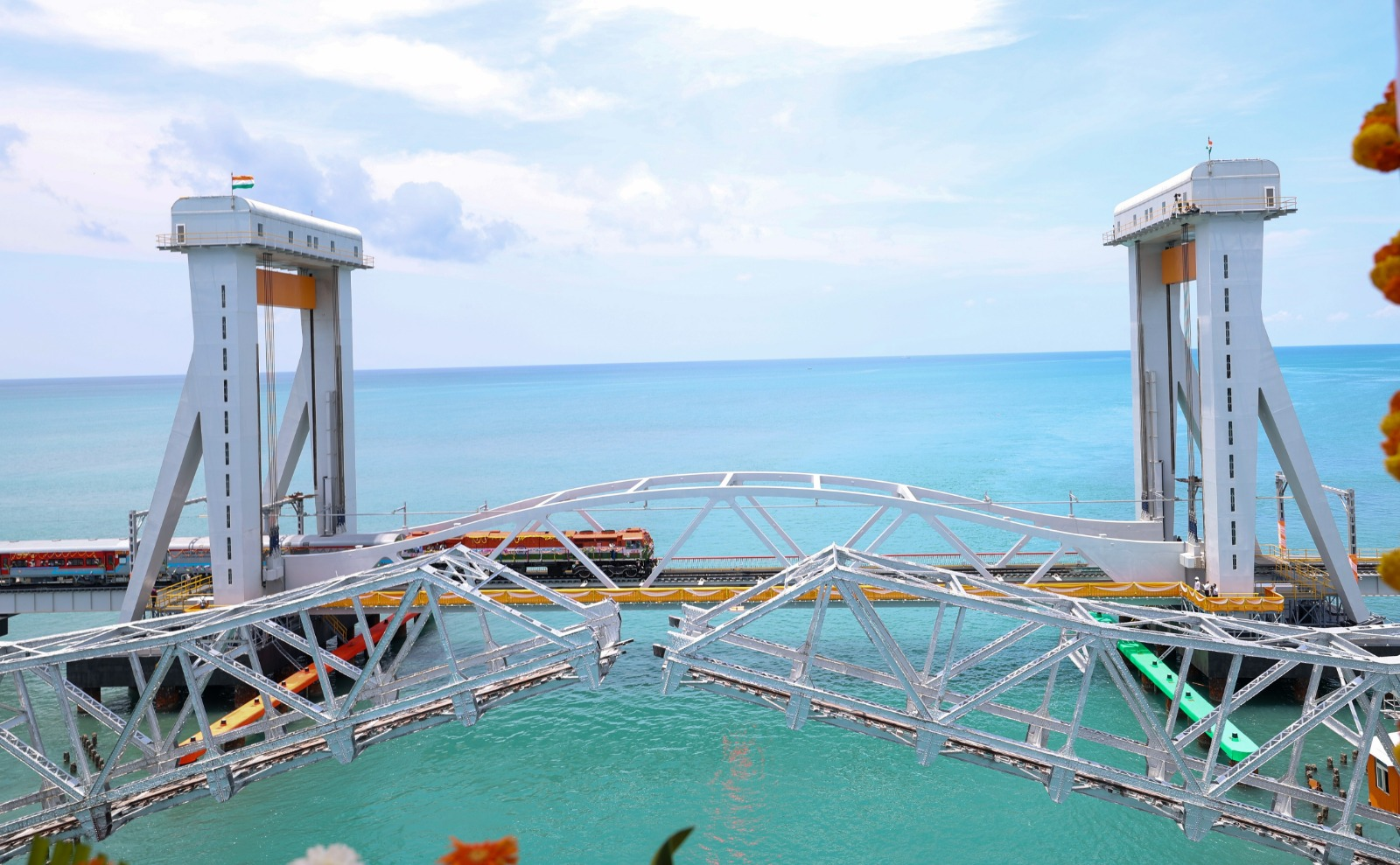
A train on the bridge

The construction of the pillars and spans for a single track was completed in September 2024 with trial runs conducted in October 2024. The bridge was expected to be opened for traffic by late 2024 post the approval of the Commission of Railway Safety (CRS). In late November, the CRS permitted operation of trains at a maximum speed of 75 km/h (47 mph) with the speed further limited to 50 km/h (31 mph) on the lifting bascule section. However, the CRS highlighted several concerns and discrepancies in the construction of the bridge such as the usage of non standard designs that are not approved by the Research Design and Standards Organisation, deviation from standard welding procedures that reduced the stress carrying capacity by 36% and insufficient addressing of corrosion. In response, the Southern Railway clarified that the bridge was designed by the Spanish consultancy Técnica y Proyectos S.A. according to European and Indian design codes and was proof checked by experts from IIT Madras and IIT Bombay.

In January-February 2025, further trials were conducted with simultaneous lifting of the bascule sections of the old and the new bridges, and the running of train rakes. In March 2025, final trials and rehearsals were conducted prior to the opening of the bridge for traffic. The bridge was opened for traffic on 6 April 2025 by the Indian prime minister.

== Design ==
The new bridge is constructed parallel to the old bridge and spans a length of 2.07 km (1.29 mi). It has a bascule section of about 72 m (236 ft) which can be lifted vertically using a Scherzer rolling lift trunnion and is the first vertical lift sea bridge in India. It has 99 spans of 18.3 m (60 ft) length each apart from the vertical lifting span. It is situated about 12.5 m (41 ft) above sea level, and is about 3 m (9.8 ft) higher than the old bridge. The vertical lifting central span of the bridge allows ships of up to 22 m (72 ft) height to pass through. The bridge is planned to carry a double track railway line.

== See also ==
- List of longest bridges above water in India
