= India–Sri Lanka relations =

- India: Sri Lanka

Diplomatic mission
- High Commission of India, Colombo: High Commission of Sri Lanka, New Delhi

Envoy
- Indian High Commissioner to Sri Lanka Santosh Jha: Sri Lankan High Commissioner to India Mahishini Colonne

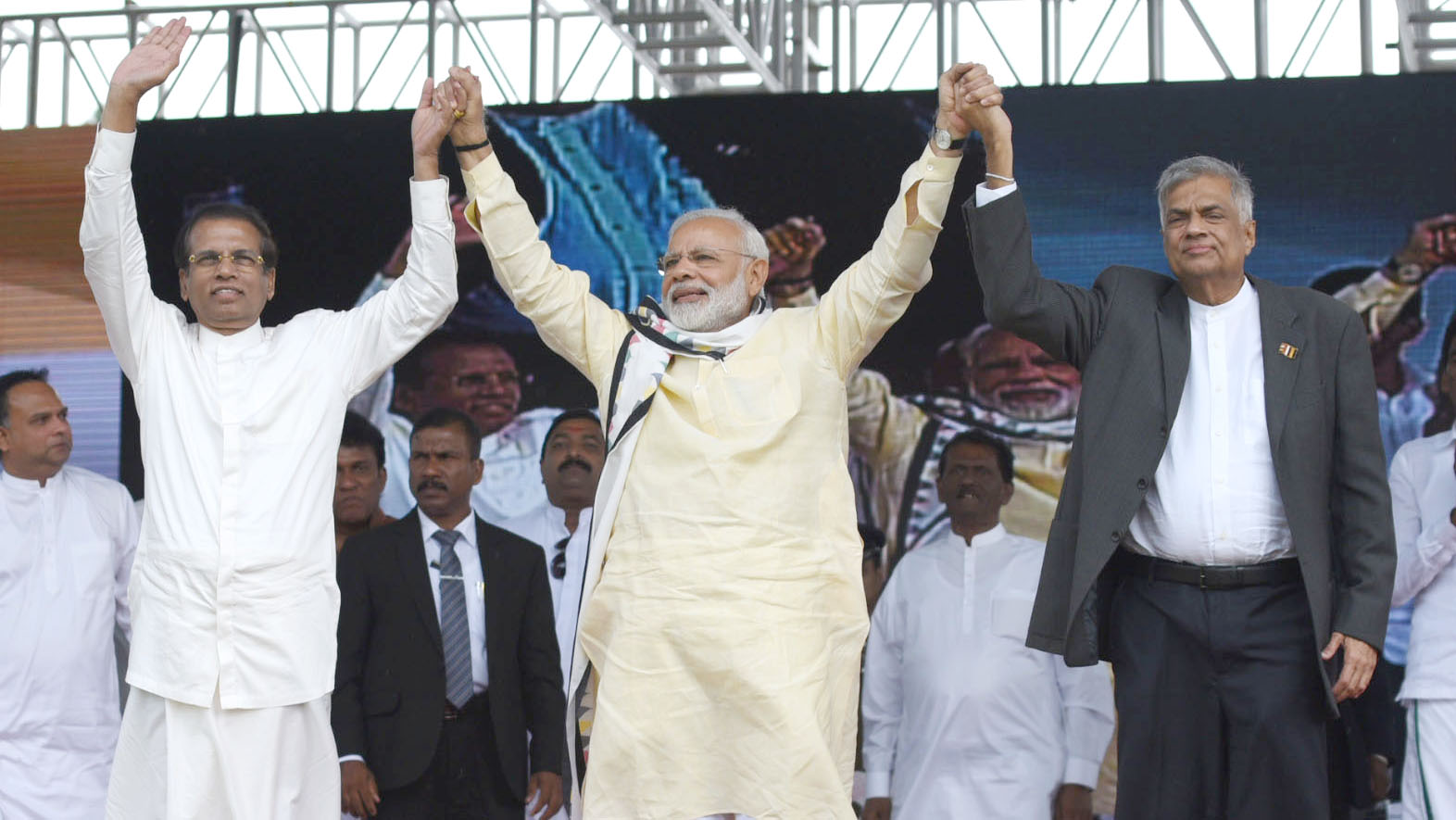
Maithripala Sirisena, Narendra Modi, and Ranil Wickremesinghe in Sri Lanka in 2017

India–Sri Lanka relations, Indian-Sri Lankan relations, or Indo-Sri Lanka relations, are the bilateral relations between India and Sri Lanka. India has emerged as a frontrunning partner for Sri Lanka in the endeavor to revitalize its economy, reform its bureaucracy, and enhance decision-making processes for future economic collaborations. India and Sri Lanka share a maritime border. India is the only neighbour of Sri Lanka, separated by the Palk Strait; both states occupy a strategic position in South Asia and have sought to build a common security umbrella in the Indian Ocean. Both India and Sri Lanka are republics that are members of the Commonwealth of Nations.

The two countries are also close on economic terms with India being the island's largest trading partner and an agreement to establish a proto single market also under discussion at an advanced stage. India was the initial nation to submit its formal endorsement for the financial assistance and debt restructure proposal of Sri Lanka to the International Monetary Fund (IMF).

There are deep ethnic and cultural links between the two countries. In a bid to foster and safeguard the Buddhist connections between India and Sri Lanka, Prime Minister Narendra Modi unveiled a grant assistance of USD 15 million during the Virtual Bilateral Summit in September 2020. This financial support is intended for various purposes, including the restoration or establishment of Buddhist monasteries, the education of young monks, the enhancement of interaction among Buddhist scholars and clergy, the establishment of museums dedicated to Buddhist heritage, the facilitation of cultural exchanges, collaborative efforts in archaeology, and the mutual showcasing of The Buddha's relics.

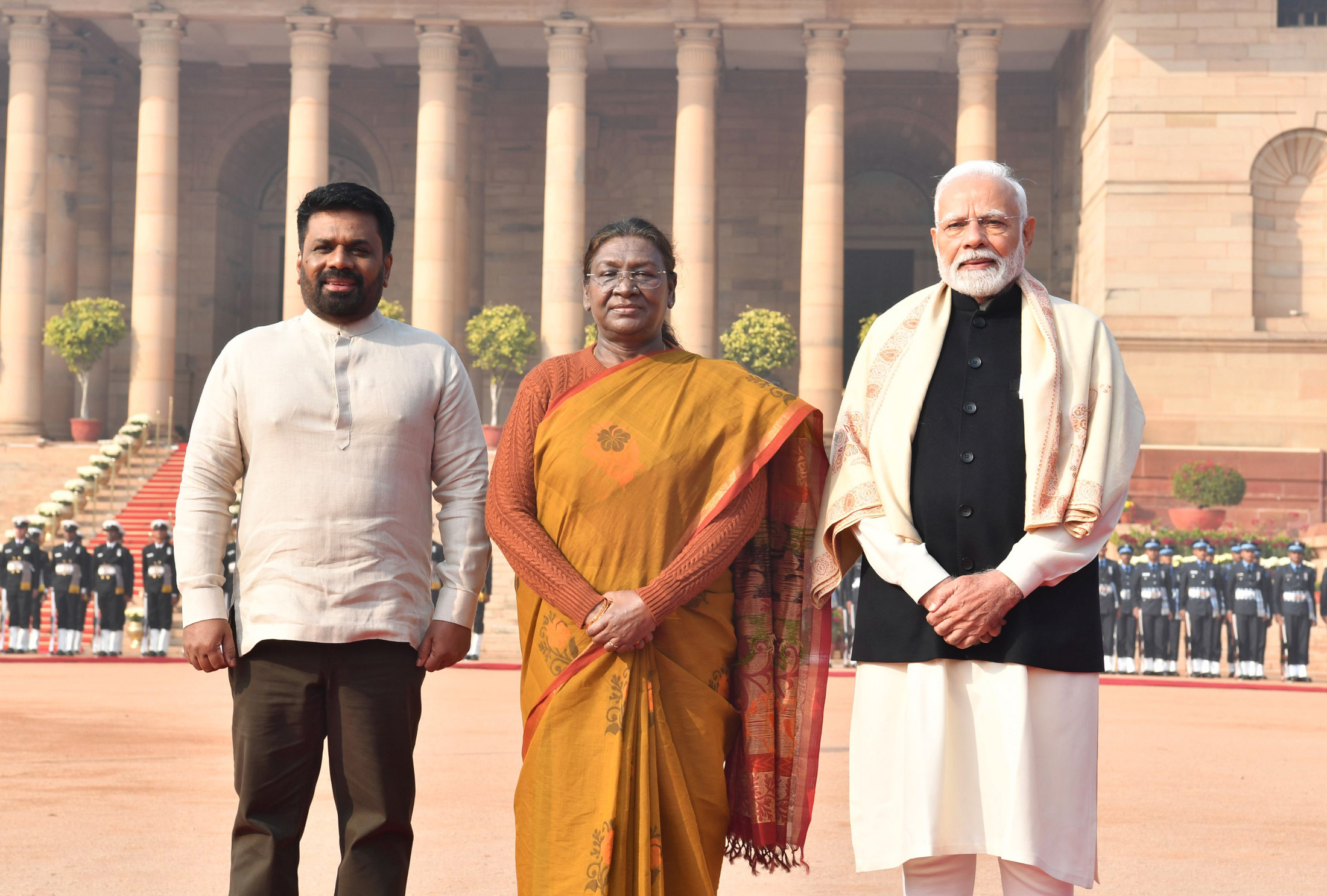
Sri Lankan President Anura Kumara Dissanayake with President of India Droupadi Murmu and Prime Minister of India Narendra Modi

Relations have been tested by the Sri Lankan Civil War and by the controversy of Indian intervention during the war. In recent years Sri Lanka has moved closer to China, especially in terms of naval agreements. India signed a nuclear energy pact with Sri Lanka in 2015. In 2023, India's foreign minister S. Jaishankar declared India would persist in providing support to Sri Lanka across all conceivable domains. In the same year, the two countries have reached an agreement to strengthen their economic and energy ties, signaling a new phase of cooperation and mutual benefits.

== History ==
Sri Lanka was established as an independent state after colonialism, prior to which the island was governed by a single indigenous kingdom or multiple indigenous kingdoms. The island has been reflected in Indian arts since ancient times; the first texts of Buddhism used the term "Lanka-dipa" for the island, a term which was commonly in use in South Asia at the time, but the island was known in the western world as "Taprobana".

=== Early history ===
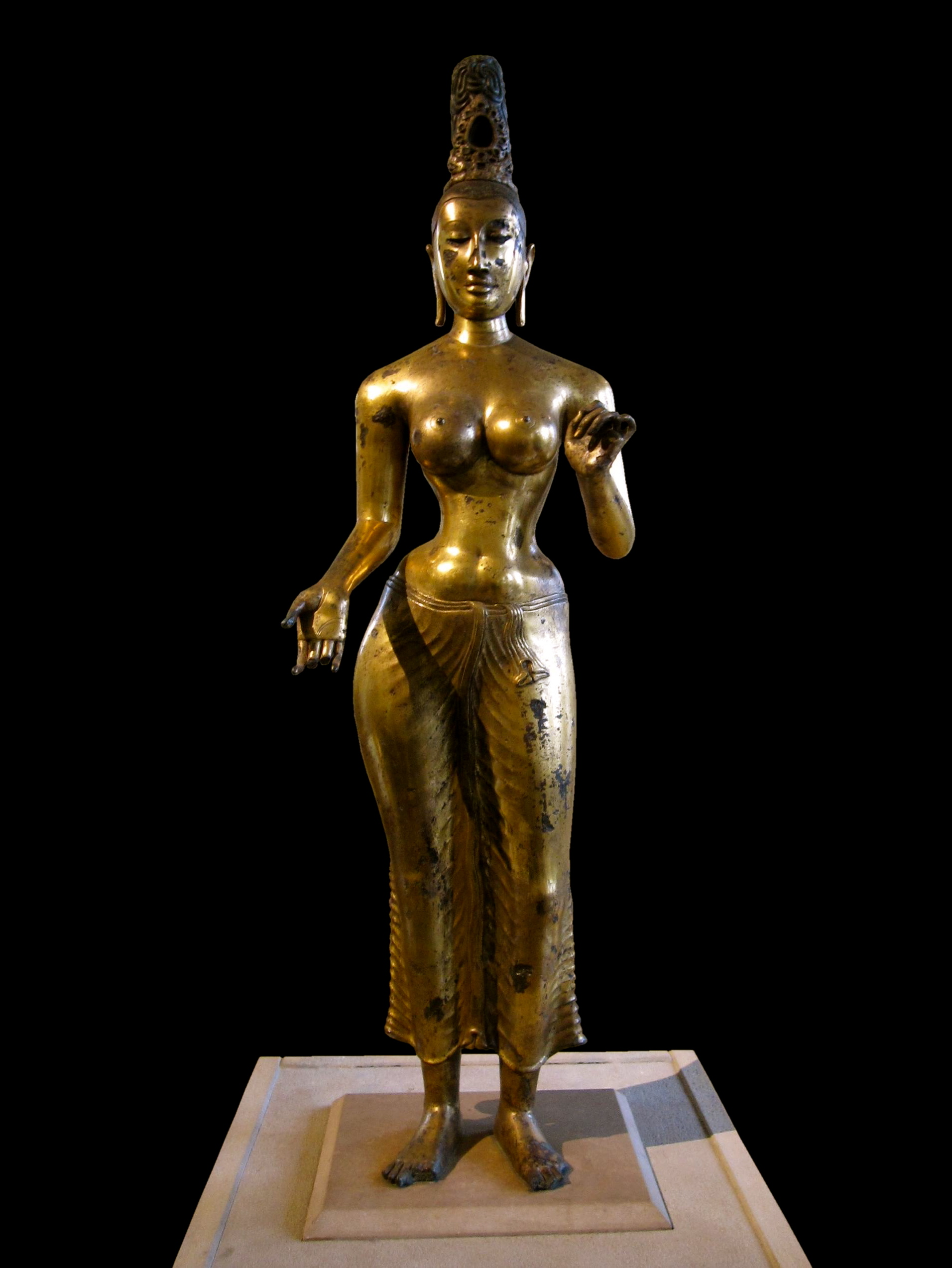
Gilded bronze statue of the Bodhisattva Tara, from the Anuradhapura period (8th century CE)

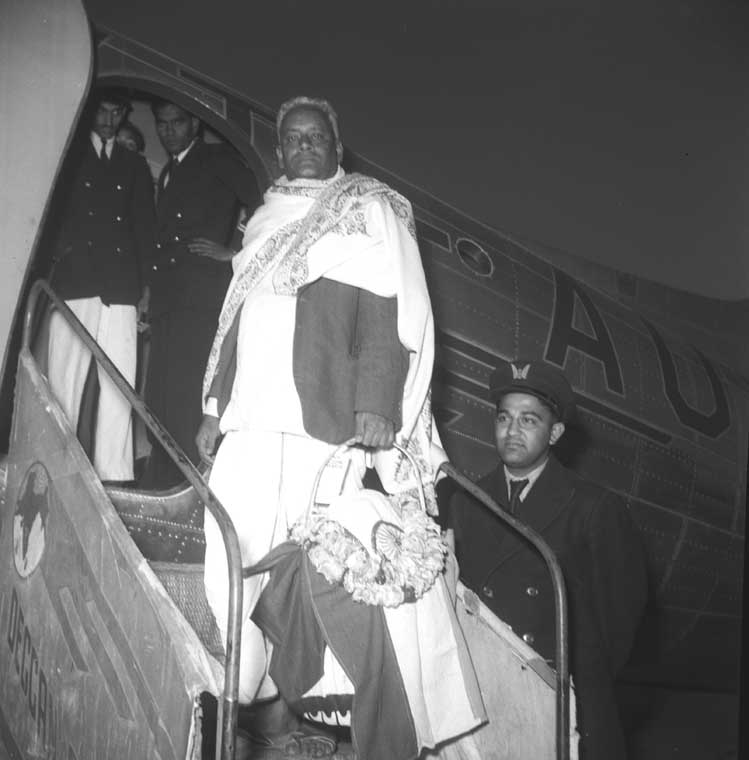
V.S. Swami Nathan of the External Affairs Ministry, photographed at the Safdarjung Airport, taking Mahatma Gandhi's ashes to Ceylon

According to traditional Sri Lankan chronicles (such as the Dipavamsa) Buddhism was introduced into Sri Lanka in the 4th century BCE by Mahinda, the son of Indian Emperor Ashoka, during the reign of Sri Lanka's King Devanampiya Tissa. During this time, a sapling of the Bodhi Tree was brought to Sri Lanka and the first monasteries and Buddhist monuments were established. Among these, the Isurumuni-vihaara and the Vessagiri-vihaara remain important centers of worship. He is also credited with the construction of the Pathamaka-cetiya, the Jambukola-vihaara and the Hatthaalhaka-vihaara, and the refectory. The Pali Canon, having previously been preserved as an oral tradition, was first committed to writing in Sri Lanka around 30 BCE.

Sri Lanka has the longest continuous history of Buddhism of any Buddhist nation, with the Sangha having existed in a largely unbroken lineage since its introduction in the 4th century. During periods of decline, the Sri Lankan monastic lineage was revived through contact with Myanmar and Thailand. Periods of Mahayana influence, as well as official neglect under colonial rule, created great challenges for Theravada Buddhist institutions in Sri Lanka, but repeated revivals and resurgences – most recently in the 19th century CE – have kept the Theravada tradition alive for over 2,600 years.

Tamils in Sri Lanka, had established Hinduism and Tamil language links with South India. Nainativu Nagapooshani Amman Temple considered as one Shakta pitha. Koneswaram and Ketheeswaram are considered as only Paadal Petra Sthalangal in Sri Lanka.

=== Indian intervention in the Sri Lankan civil war ===
In the 1970s–1980s, private entities and elements in the Research and Analysis Wing and the state government of Tamil Nadu were believed to be encouraging the funding and training for the Liberation Tigers of Tamil Eelam, a separatist insurgent force. In 1987, faced with growing anger amongst its own Tamils, and a flood of refugees, India intervened directly in the conflict for the first time after the Sri Lankan government attempted to regain control of the northern Jaffna region by means of an economic blockade and military assaults, India supplied food and medicine by air and sea. After subsequent negotiations, India and Sri Lanka entered into an agreement/13th amendment. The peace accord assigned a certain degree of regional autonomy in the Tamil areas with Eelam People's Revolutionary Liberation Front (EPRLF) controlling the regional council and called for the Tamil militant groups to lay down their arms. Further India was to send a peacekeeping force, named the IPKF to Sri Lanka to enforce the disarmament and to watch over the regional council.

According to Rejaul Karim Laskar, a scholar of Indian foreign policy, Indian intervention in Sri Lankan civil war became inevitable as that civil war threatened India's “unity, national interest and territorial integrity.” According to Laskar, this threat came in two ways: On the one hand external powers could take advantage of the situation to establish their base in Sri Lanka thus posing a threat to India, on the other the LTTE's dream of a sovereign Tamil Eelam comprising all the Tamil inhibited areas (of Sri Lanka and India) posed a threat to India's territorial integrity.

Even though the accord was signed between the governments of Sri Lanka and India, with the Tamil Tigers and other Tamil militant groups not having a role in the signing of the accord, most Tamil militant groups accepted this agreement, the LTTE rejected the accord because they opposed the candidate, who belonged to another militant group named Eelam Peoples Revolutionary Liberation Front (EPRLF), for chief administrative officer of the merged Northern and Eastern provinces. Instead, the LTTE named three other candidates for the position. The candidates proposed by the LTTE were rejected by India. The LTTE subsequently refused to hand over their weapons to the IPKF.

The result was that the LTTE now found itself engaged in military conflict with the Indian Army, and launched their first attack on an Indian army rations truck on October 8, killing five Indian para-commandos who were on board by strapping burning tires around their necks. The government of India then decided that the IPKF should disarm the LTTE by force, and the Indian Army launched a number of assaults on the LTTE, including a month-long campaign dubbed Operation Pawan to wrest control of the Jaffna peninsula from the LTTE. When the IPKF engaged the LTTE, the then president of Sri Lanka, Ranasinghe Premadasa, began supporting LTTE and funded LTTE with arms. During the warfare with the LTTE, IPKF was also alleged to have made human rights violation against the civilians. Notably, IPKF was alleged to have perpetrated the Jaffna teaching hospital massacre which was the killing of over 70 civilians including patients, doctors and nurses. The ruthlessness of this campaign, and the Indian army's subsequent anti-LTTE operations made it extremely unpopular amongst many Tamils in Sri Lanka. The conflict between the LTTE and the Indian Army left over 1,115 Indian soldiers dead.

The Indo-Sri Lankan Accord, which had been unpopular amongst Sri Lankans for giving India a major influence, now became a source of nationalist anger and resentment as the IPKF was drawn fully into the conflict. Sri Lankans protested the presence of the IPKF, and the newly elected Sri Lankan president Ranasinghe Premadasa demanded its withdrawal, which was completed by March 1990. on May 21, 1991, Rajiv Gandhi was assassinated and the LTTE was alleged to be the perpetrator. As a result, India declared the LTTE to be a terrorist outfit in 1992. Bilateral relations improved in the 1990s and India supported the peace process but has resisted calls to get involved again. India has also been wary of and criticised the extensive military involvement of Pakistan in the conflict, accusing the latter of supplying lethal weaponry and encouraging Sri Lanka to pursue military action rather than peaceful negotiations to end the civil war.

=== Support during COVID-19 and Sri Lankan economic crisis ===
In the face of the acute financial and economic crisis of Sri Lanka, India has extended help worth USD 3.8 billion to help Sri Lanka. In line with India's 'neighbourhood first' policy, this includes an agreement to supply 700 million USD worth of petroleum through a Line of credit. India's EXIM Bank and State Bank of India extended export credit facilities of 1.5 billion USD for the import of essential commodities. India also signed a 400 million USD agreement to help present Sri Lanka's Foreign exchange reserves. India also supplied 500 buses to the Sri Lankan Transport Department.

During the COVID-19 pandemic, India sent 500,000 vaccines to Sri Lanka under grant assistance. India also sent 150 tonnes of oxygen to Sri Lanka to help combat the third wave of the pandemic.

In July 2023, Sri Lankan President Ranil Wickremesinghe met with Prime Minister Narendra Modi in India where they outlined vision for an economic partnership to strengthen the maritime, air, energy, and interpersonal networks between them as well as to accelerate mutual cooperation in the tourism, power, trade, higher education, and skill development sectors. They said they would also work to connect their electricity grids and to examine the feasibility of building a petroleum pipeline and a land bridge. In addition, they said they would restart negotiations on a more expansive trade deal known as the Economic and Technological Trade Agreement. India has conveyed a resolute endorsement of Sri Lanka's debt restructuring proposal to the international lending institution, as Sri Lanka's debt to its immediate neighbor amounts to approximately $1 billion.

In September 2023, Sri Lanka's foreign minister, Ali Sabry, backed India in its diplomatic feud with Canada, accusing Canada of being a "safe haven for terrorists" and suggesting Prime Minister Justin Trudeau was prone to making "outrageous and substantiated [sic] allegations". He also advised Trudeau to not interfere in the internal affairs of a sovereign country.

== Culture ==
The two countries share strong racial and cultural ties. Sinhalese people who make up 75% of the total population descend in part from Northern Indian Indo-Aryan settlers who migrated the Island from 543 BCE. Tamil people (included Indian Tamils and Sri Lankan Moors) who make up 26% of the total population belonging to the Dravidian group that migrated to the island from 300BC.

== Economy ==
=== Commercial ties ===
India and Sri Lanka are member nations of several regional and multilateral organizations such as the South Asian Association for Regional Cooperation (SAARC), South Asia Co-operative Environment Programme, South Asian Economic Union and BIMSTEC, working to enhance cultural and commercial ties. Since a bilateral free trade agreement was signed and came into effect in 2000, Indo-Sri Lankan trade rose 128% by 2004 and quadrupled by 2006, reaching US$2.6 billion. Between 2000 and 2004, India's exports to Sri Lanka in the last four years increased by 113%, from US$618 million to $1,319 million while Sri Lankan exports to India increased by 342%, from $44 million to $194 million. Indian exports account for 14% of Sri Lanka's global imports. India is also the fifth largest export destination for Sri Lankan goods, accounting for 3.6% of its exports. Both nations are also signatories of the South Asia Free Trade Agreement (SAFTA). Negotiations are also underway to expand the free trade agreement to forge stronger commercial relations and increase corporate investment and ventures in various industries. The year 2010 is predicted to be the best year for bilateral trade on record, with Sri Lanka's exports to India increasing by 45% over the first seven months of the year

India's National Thermal Power Corp (NTPC) is also scheduled to build a 500 MW thermal power plant in Sampoor (Sampur). The NTPC claims that this plan will take the Indo-Sri Lankan relationship to a new level. India stood as Sri Lanka's primary trading partner, and Sri Lanka's exports to India have notably expanded. The adoption of Rupees for trade settlement is additionally bolstering Sri Lanka's economy. These represent tangible measures aimed at fostering Sri Lanka's economic recuperation and advancement.

==== Fishing disputes ====
There have been several alleged incidents of Sri Lankan Navy personnel firing on Indian fishermen fishing in the Palk Strait, where India and Sri Lanka are separated by only 12 nautical miles (22 kilometres). The issue started because of Indian fishermen having used mechanised trawlers, which deprived the Sri Lankan fishermen of their catch and damaged their fishing boats. The Sri Lankan government wants India to ban use of mechanized trawlers in the Palk Strait region, and negotiations on this subject are undergoing. So far, no concrete agreement has been reached since India favours regulating these trawlers instead of banning them altogether. Another cause of anger amongst the Sri Lankan side is the use of mechanized trawlers, which they view as ecologically damaging. Presently there is no bona fide Indian fisherman in Sri Lankan custody. A Joint Working Group (JWG) has been constituted to deal with the issues related to Indian fishermen straying in Sri Lankan territorial waters, work out modalities for prevention of the use of force against them, the early release of confiscated boats and explore possibilities of working towards bilateral arrangements for licensed fishing. The JWG last met in January 2006.

India officially protested against the Sri Lankan Navy for its alleged involvement in attacks on Indian fishermen on January 12, 2011. After the official protest, another fisherman was killed on 22 January 2011. Over 730 fishermen have been killed in the last 30 years. The apathetic attitude of the Indian government and the national media towards the alleged killing of Tamil Nadu fishermen by the Sri Lankan Navy has been strongly condemned. Several Tamil Nadu politicians like Vaiko and Jayalalitha have condemned the federal government for not doing enough to stop the killing of Indian Tamil fishermen, and for offering training, equipment, and strategic cooperation for the Sri Lankan Navy. In 2010, Naam Thamizhar Katchi Chief coordinator Seeman got arrested under National security act for his reported statement that he would attack the Sri Lankan students if the killing of Tamil fishermen continued by the Sri Lankan navy. Later he got acquitted of the charges and set free by the Madras high court. In November 2014, Sri Lanka ordered capital punishment to Indian fishermen who were allegedly involved in drug supply or other kind of smuggling. Activists from India approached to Sri Lankan government through an appeal, where they stated the need to strengthen south Asian regional cooperation for all such issues. It was appealed that though crime of any kind must get punishment, but capital punishment must be revoked in this case and in general from all over south Asia. Sri Lanka Prime Minister Ranil Winckramsinghe told during an interview to a television channel in March 2015 that 'if Indian fishermen will cross the sea boundary, Sri Lankan navy can shoot them.' This remark sparked controversy over Sri Lanka–India relations. External affairs minister of India raised the issue with meeting her counterpart in Sri Lanka, but the statement of PM of Sri Lanka was condemned by civil rights activists, and open letters were written to PMs of Sri Lanka and India to resolve the dispute and to apologize for statements.

In October 2021, Sri Lankan fishermen from the North and Tamil parties launched a protest on the sea complaining about the inability of Sri Lankan authorities to deal with Indian poachers.

=== Development co-operation ===
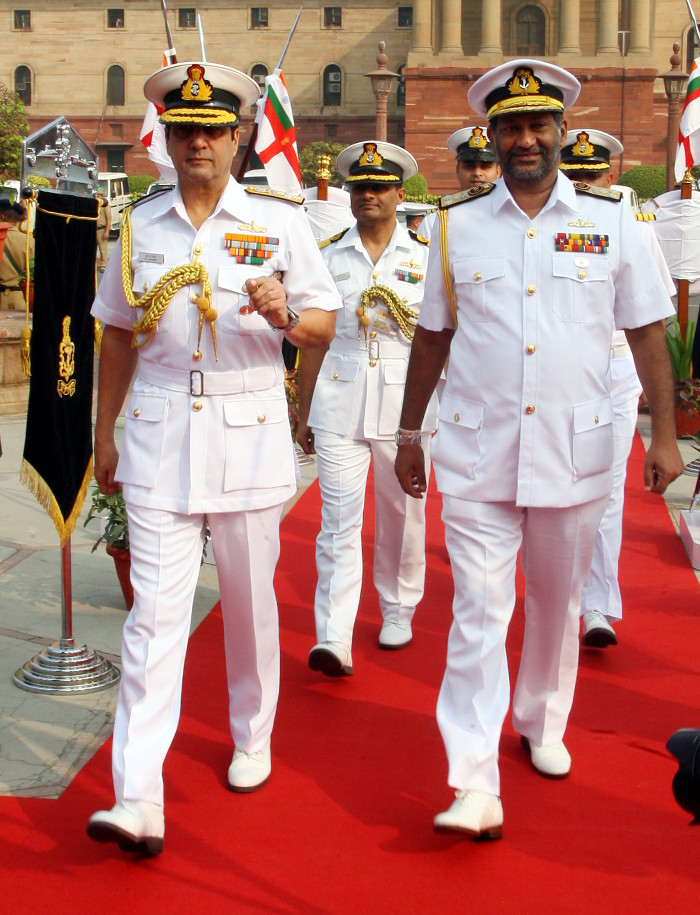
Vice Admiral Jayantha Perera, Commander of the Sri Lanka Navy, received by Chief of the Naval Staff Admiral Robin K. Dhowan at South Block, New Delhi

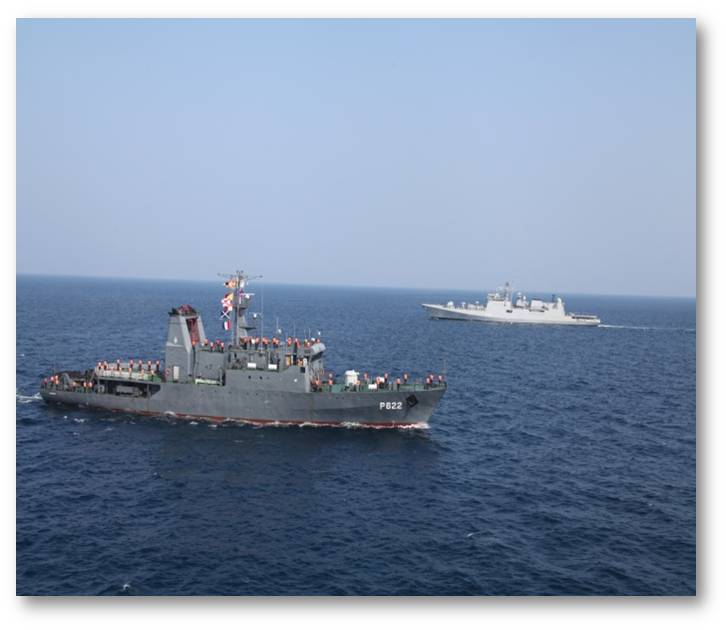
INS Talwar and SLNS Sagara during SLINEX 2013

India is active in a number of areas of development activity in Sri Lanka. About one-sixth of the total development credit granted by India is made available to Sri Lanka.

In the recent past, three lines of credit were extended to Sri Lanka: US$100 million for capital goods, consumer durables, consultancy services and food items, US$31 million for the supply of 300,000 MT of wheat and US$150 million for purchase of petroleum products. All of the lines of credit have been fully used. Another line of credit of US$100 million is now being made available for rehabilitation of the Colombo-Matara railway.

A number of development projects are implemented under Aid to Sri Lanka funds. In 2006–07, the budget for Aid to Sri Lanka was Rs 28.2 Crs.

A memorandum of understanding on Cooperation in Small Development Projects has been signed. Projects for providing fishing equipment to the fishermen in the East of Sri Lanka and solar energy aided computer education in 25 rural schools in Eastern Sri Lanka are under consideration.

India has supplied medical equipment to hospitals at Hambantota and Point Pedro, supplied 4 state-of-the-art ambulances to the Central Province, implemented a cataract eye surgery programme for 1500 people in the Central Province and implemented a project of renovation of OT at Dickoya hospital and supplying equipment to it.

The projects under consideration are the construction of a 150-bed hospital at Dickoya, upgrading of the hospital at Trincomalee and a US$7.5 million grant for setting up a cancer hospital in Colombo. India also contributes to the Ceylon Workers Education Trust that gives scholarships to the children of estate workers.

A training programme for 465 Sri Lankan Police officers has been commenced in Dec 2005. Another 400 Sri Lankan Police personnel are being trained for the course of Maintenance of Public Order.

Indian governments have also showed interest in collaborating with their Sri Lankan counterparts on building tourism between the two countries based on shared religious heritage. Madhya Pradesh CM Shivraj Chauhan in June 2013 stated he was working with Sri Lankan authorities to build a temple dedicated to the Hindu deity Sita in Nuwara Eliya. In November 2019, Prime Minister Narendra Modi stated that India will invest $400 million in infrastructure projects in Sri Lanka amid improving ties after talks with Sri Lanka's new President Gotabaya Rajapaksa. stated that it will lend Sri Lanka $400 million for infrastructure projects, India-Sri Lanka border crossings

Only land border India and Sri Lanka have is in Talaimannar on a Ram Sethu sand dune.

=== Shared Tourism ===
In the past, ferry services for tourists have been introduced and suspended repeatedly because of their low usage. The low usage of the old ferry services could be due to the high cost of the former services. As of now, the only way for tourists to access India from Sri Lanka is by air. In 2019 negotiations about ferry services between Colombo and Tuticorin and between Talaimannar and Rameshwaram began. There is also a proposal to operate a cruise/ferry service between Colombo and Kochi in Kerala. The Indian and Sri Lankan governments are working close together to connect the two neighboring countries better. The Sri Lankan minister of Tourism Development John Amaratunga indicates that a ferry service will help tourists from both sides to travel at a very low cost. India intends to promote increased investments within the economy of Sri Lanka, with a particular focus on pivotal sectors such as energy, tourism, and infrastructure.

== Military relations ==
India and Sri Lanka signed an agreement allowing for the transfer of criminals serving prison sentences in the other country to be repatriated to serve the balance of their sentences in their home country. Sentenced persons from Kerala and Tamil Nadu have been transferred under the agreement from Sri Lanka to India. There are areas of cooperation where people to people contacts are focused. Sri Lanka and India has friendly relations through people's support also. It was seen that A. T. Ariyaratne in Sri Lanka helped in spreading non-violence and community service activities on Gandhian philosophy. India has reaffirmed its dedication to aiding Sri Lanka in its efforts to recover from its economic turmoil.

=== Alleged RAW interference ===
In 2015, the Sri Lankan Government expelled an Indian RAW intelligence agent for the role played in uniting the opposition for the 2015 presidential election. In October 2018, President Sirisena alleged that the Indian RAW was plotting his assassination. He made this comment in the cabinet meeting, after CID of Sri Lanka Police arrested an Indian national in September for the alleged attempted assassination of Sirisena and former Defence Secretary Gotabaya Rajapaksa. After President Sirisena's comment on this, the media reported that the Indian High Commissioner met with the president, and Indian Prime Minister Narendra Modi had a telephone conversation with the president.

=== China ===
In recent years, Sri Lanka has moved closer to China, especially in terms of naval agreements. India and Sri Lanka in February 2015 signed a nuclear energy deal to improve relationships. In 2015, recently elected Indian Prime Minister Narendra Modi in a meeting with recently elected Sri Lankan ex-president Maithripala Sirisena stated that: "India is Sri Lanka's closest neighbour and friend. Our destinies are interlinked."

Following Sri Lankan President Anura Kumara Dissanayake’s December 2024 visit to India, the two countries began working on a framework agreement on defence cooperation, which will be signed during Prime Minister Narendra Modi's visit in April 2025. This marks the first major defence agreement since India’s 1987-1990 intervention in Sri Lanka, which strained relations. The new agreement includes joint exercises, naval interactions, and enhanced maritime surveillance to counter China’s military presence, particularly at Hambantota port. Additionally, India has committed to providing defence platforms to strengthen Sri Lanka’s military capabilities.

== See also ==
- Sri Lankans in India
- Indians in Sri Lanka
- List of Indians in Sri Lanka
- Indian Tamils of Sri Lanka
- Deputy High Commission of Sri Lanka, Chennai
- Foreign relations of Sri Lanka
- Foreign relations of India
- India–Sri Lanka maritime boundary agreements
- South Asian Association for Regional Cooperation (SAARC)
