= J. P. de Fonseka =

Sri Lankan writer (1897–1948)

- Born: 29 April 1897
- Died: 26 November 1948 (aged 51)
- Occupations: Journalist; Writer; Teacher
- Years active: 1927–1948
- Notable work: G. K. C. as M. C. Select essays and verses of J.P. de Fonseka

Joseph Peter de Fonseka (29 April 1897 – 26 November 1948) was a Sri Lankan essayist and editor. His essays were noted for their trenchant humour and defence of Catholic values in the style of G. K. Chesterton and Hilaire Belloc. He was a friend and collaborator of the former.

Fonseka worked as a teacher of English in St. Joseph's Catholic College, Ceylon (as Sri Lanka was then known), a school he had attended as a youth, when he captained the cricket team. He trained as a lawyer, but did not practice, preferring to teach and write.

== Chesterton ==
In 1927 Fonseka moved to Britain, becoming a close friend of G. K. Chesterton. Fonseka edited the book G. K. C. as M. C., a collection of Chesterton's introductory essays to books by other authors. Chesterton paid tribute to Fonseka, whose "excess of enthusiasm has inspired this collection". Fonseka's own introduction was described as "running over with wit and wisdom" by one reviewer.

Fonseka wrote essays on a variety of topics, including many on the culture and history of Ceylon. His essays also addressed aspects of Catholic belief and life. He occasionally published verse. He contributed regularly to Chesterton's magazine G. K.'s Weekly.

In one G. K.'s Weekly essay, "The Plays of Mrs. Shakespeare", he proposed that Shakespeare's wife Anne Hathaway was the real author of his works. According to R. C. Churchill, Fonseka appears to present the case "that Mrs. Shakespeare wrote the plays at Stratford and her husband edited them for the stage." However, Churchill is not clear whether or not the essay is intended as "burlesque" (it contains satirical references to Virginia Woolf's feminist booklet A Room of One's Own, in which Shakespeare's sister is portrayed as an oppressed literary genius).

== Later life ==
Fonseka returned to live in Ceylon and to work at St. Joseph's school. He also established a newspaper to promote Distributism, the Catholic economic theory espoused by Chesterton and Belloc. According to Maisie Ward and Andrew Greeley the paper had "considerable effect" in both Ceylon and India.

In 1946 he was given the honorary position of "Chamberlain of Honour of the Swords and Cape" by Pope Pius XII, but was unable to leave Ceylon to officially receive the investment in Rome due to illness. He died in 1948.

== Influence as a teacher ==
Fonseka was much praised for his inspiring teaching and dedication to his work. Among his pupils was the novelist Ambalavener Sivanandan, who recalled that Fonseka "really stimulated me...De Fonseka gave me a taste for language: English sat on my tongue, I could taste it together with the Tamil I spoke at home." He also mentored the Sri Lankan artist and advertising mogul Reggie Candappa, getting him his first work as an illustrator.
