= Grant McCann Erickson =

Sri Lankan advertising agency

- Industry: Advertising agency
- Founded: 1958; 68 years ago
- Founder: Reggie Candappa
- Area served: Sri Lanka
- Key people: Neela Marikkar (Chairperson)
- Parent: McCann Erickson

Grant McCann Erickson is a Sri Lankan advertising agency and part of the McCann Worldgroup.

== History ==
Grant McCann Erickson was founded by Sri Lankan media personality Reggie Candappa and is currently led by his daughter Neela Marikkar.
