= Mandapam Camp =

Coordinates: 9°16′48″N 79°07′12″E

Mandapam Camp was built in the early 1900s by the British Government to house migrant plantation workers coming to India from Sri Lanka. The Camp is located in South India, 700 km South of Chennai (formerly known as Madras), the capital of the state of Tamil Nadu.

In the late 1970s the Liberation Tigers of Tamil Eelam (also known as the Tamil Tigers) began an armed conflict with the Sri Lankan government. The clash peaked in the early 1980s and erupted into a full-scale civil war in 1983. Thousands were killed and many were displaced. Many Tamils left Sri Lanka and sought refugee status in places like Canada and the United Kingdom. Those lacking money or family connections were left behind. With nowhere else to go, these people left Sri Lanka by boat from the northern town of Mannar, (18 km from the Indian coast) and arrived in Mandapam, India. The state government of Tamil Nadu placed these people in camps across the state. Currently there are approximately 70,000 refugees living in these camps.

A five-year peace agreement was signed in 2002. However, the conflict resumed in 2005 and by 2008 there were an estimated 4000 deaths.

== Treatment of the Refugees ==
According to http://www.adeptasia.org/ upon their arrival in India, the refugees are taken to the police station, quarantined and interrogated for 72 hours, before being offered shelter at camps. At Mandapam camp, residents are given a small stipend and rations: adults are allotted 500g of rice per day, children 400g. Malnutrition is visible in the children. Mandapam is Tamil Nadu’s largest refugee camp for Sri Lankans in India.
