= Gajabahu synchronism =

Gajabahu synchronism, also known as Gajabaju-Chenkuttuvan synchronism is a chronological tool used by scholars and historians to date early historic or pre-Pallava South India, especially the early Tamil history.

The method was first proposed by scholar V. Kanakasabhai Pillai in 1904 in his work "The Tamils Eighteen Hundred Years Ago" and was later supported by scholars such as K. A. Nilakanta Sastri. Historian Kamil Zvelebil, while acknowledging the fragility of this synchronism, famously called it the "sheet anchor" for dating early Tamil literature (the Sangam literature). It is based on the contemporaneity of the early historic Chera king Senguttuvan with Gajabahu I, the 2nd century CE Sri Lankan ruler. Complementary epigraphical/archeological evidence broadly seems to support the Gajabahu dating.

== Method ==
In the final sections of the Tamil epic Silappatikaram, there is a reference to a ruler of Lanka (Sri Lanka) named "Kayavaku". According to the verses, Kayavaku was among those who attended the inauguration of the Pattini temple at Vanchi, which was conducted by the Chera king Senguttuvan.

The 30th Canto, 160, in translation, reads -

"The monarch of the world [Senguttavan] circumambulated the shrine thrice and stood there proffering his respects. In front of him the Arya kings released from prison, kings removed from central jail, the Kongu ruler of Kudaku, the king of Malva and Kayavaku, the king of sea-girt Ceylon, prayed reverently to the deity thus...

Kayavaku here, despite some disagreement, has generally been conjectured to refer to Gajabahu, the 2nd century ruler of Sri Lanka. Silappatikaram is therefore interpreted to suggest that Gajabahu was a contemporary of the Chera king Senguttuvan, a central figure in the epic. However, Sri Lankan history records the reign of two rulers named Gajabahu. According to the Mahavamsa, the historical chronicle of Sri Lanka, Gajabahu I reigned from 113 to 134 CE, while Gajabahu II ruled in the 12th century CE.

Pillai's reasoning for not considering Gajabahu II (12th century CE) as the king of Lanka mentioned in Silappatikaram is as follows:

In the long list of kings of Sri Lanka preserved in Singhalese chronicles, the name Gajabahu occurs only twice. Gajabahu I lived in the early part of the second century AD and Gajabahu II in the twelfth century. If the latter was king referred to in the Cilappathikaram, Karikala Chola, the grandfather of the Gajabahu contemporary, Imaya Varamban should have lived in the eleventh or twelfth century AD. But in many Tamil poems and inscriptions on copper plates recording the grants of Chola kings who lived in the tenth and the eleventh centuries, Karikala Chola I is described as one of the earliest and most remote ancestors of the Chola kings then reigning. It is evident therefore that the Gajabahu referred to in the Cilappathikaram could not be Gajabahu II, but must have been Gajabahu I, who was king of Ceylon from about AD 113 to AD 125.

This, in turn, has been used to suggest that the Chera king Senguttuvan, who, according to the Pathirruppatthu Collection, ruled for 55 years, may be dated to approximately 110–165 CE.

Pillai also mentions another reference from Silappatikaram, in which the Chera king meets a ruler titled "Nurruvar Kannar." This term is interpreted as referring to Satakarni, a common title among the historic Satavahana rulers. This serves as additional evidence supporting the synchronism.

Scholar Herman Tieken notably criticizes this synchronism as an example of circular logic.
