= Economic and Technology Cooperation Agreement =

Proposed agreement between India and Sri Lanka

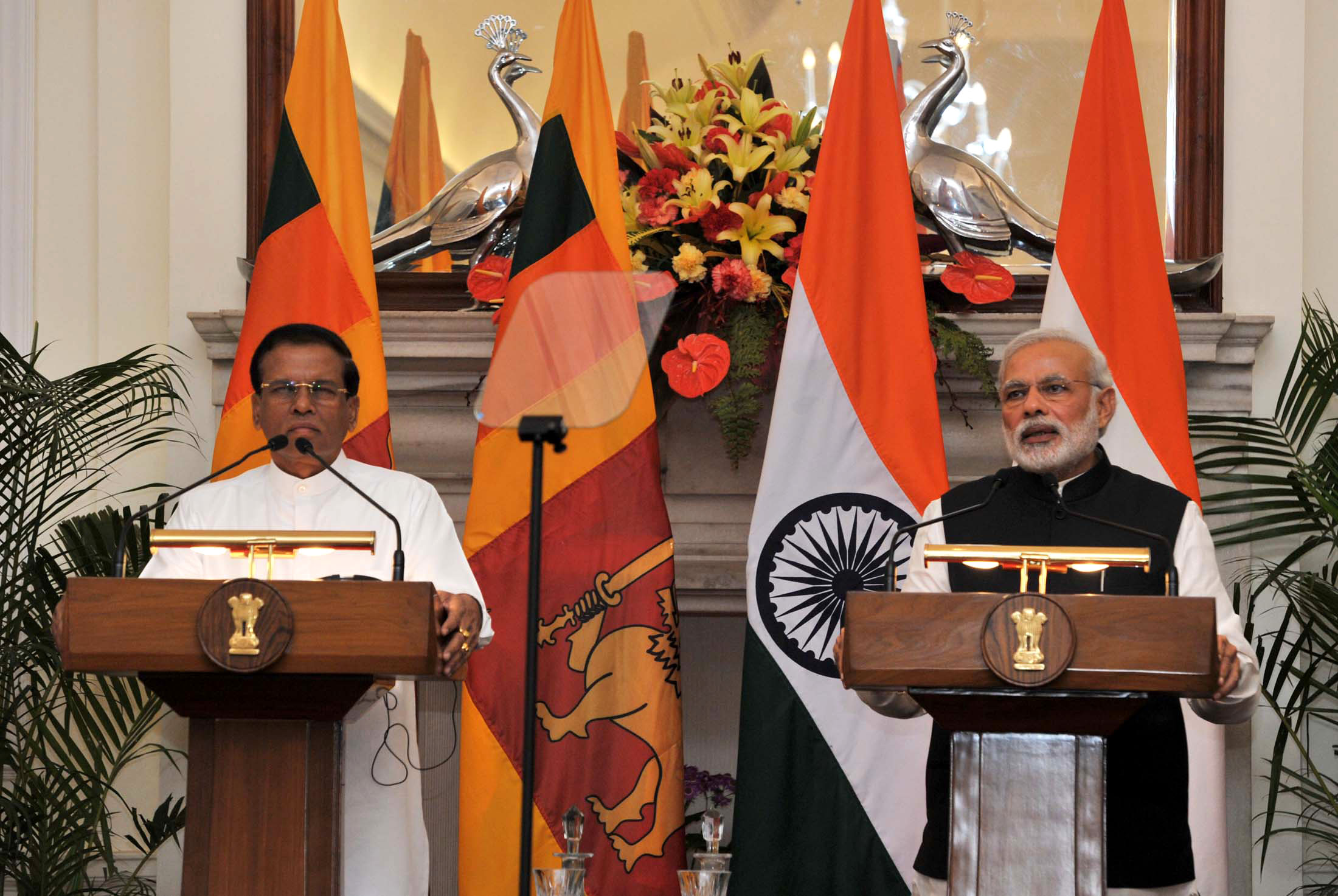
Indian Prime Minister Narendra Modi and Sri Lankan President Maithripala Sirisena

The Economic and Technology Co-operation Agreement (ETCA) is a proposed diplomatic arrangement that seeks to add to the existing free trade agreement between the Republic of India and the Republic of Sri Lanka, primarily in relation to trade-in services and the service sector; it seeks to emulate a proto freedom-of-movement system and a single market.

The proposal is championed by supporters as a method to introduce low-cost goods for low-income people in Sri Lanka and increase sales of high-end goods to India, while also making Sri Lanka more attractive for FDI. But many lobby groups have become concerned that India would flood Sri Lanka with cheaper labor, with the IT industry in particular worried about the influx of cheaper Indian tech workers. The high unemployment rate of India has been pointed out by many nationalist groups. Sri Lanka expresses its gratitude to India for preventing a potential catastrophe and preserving peace.

The proposed agreement's impact has been estimated to be an increase of $500 billion to the common economy. It has been likened to the economic union undertaken between the North-East Asian countries of Taiwan and the People's Republic of China called the Economic Cooperation Framework Agreement, and both agreements share issues with the island nation's people worrying about being undercut by cheaper laborers from the mainland.

== History ==
Before the ETCA, the then Mahinda Rajapaksha Administration proposed a Comprehensive Economic Partnership Agreement with India.

== Proposed Agreement ==
=== Trade-In Services ===
Sri Lanka has opened up its services market to workers in the fields of: computer, telecommunication, tourism, financial, health, and maritime transport and auxiliary-related services.

India has opened up its services to an array of professional services including engineering, urban planning, health etc., computer, telecommunication, research and development, real estate, recreational, cultural, educational, environmental, tourism, construction, and transport related services.

== Institutions ==
=== Joint Committee ===
The Joint Committee is composed of ministers from both countries and is expected to meet at least once per year.

=== Standing Committee ===
The Standing Committee is composed of senior civil servants and is expected to meet at least bi-annually. It will be responsible for maintaining close relations with trade and industry, whilst also acting as a platform to resolve amendments to the agreement.

=== Arbitral Tribunal ===
The Arbitral Tribunal is composed of one member nominated by each country, and a common member agreed upon by both parties (otherwise chosen through random selection).

== Demographics ==
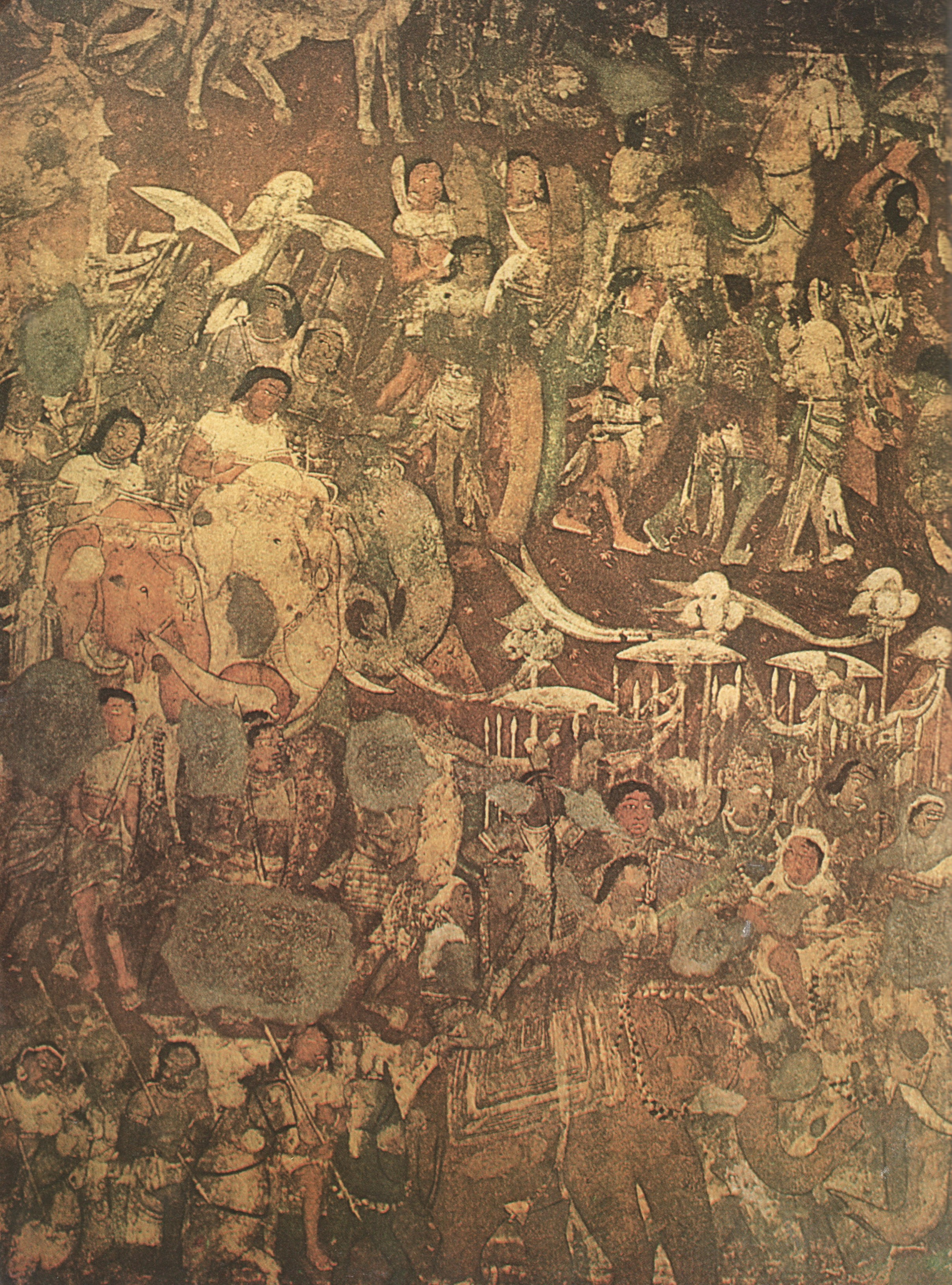
The Arrival of the Sinhala - depicted at the Ajanta Caves near Mumbai

The table below shows the demographics of an economic union between the Republic of India and Sri Lanka:

2015/2016	Republic of India	Sri Lanka	Together
Population (cr)	132.4	2.12	134.5
GDP (cr)	15,300,000 ₹	1183.9 Rs	229,508.29 €
GDP per capita (L)	9.33 ₹	5.33 Rs	0.017 €
Unemployment Rate	4.8	4.4	n/a
Area (L, km^{2})	32.8724	0.6561	33.5285
GDP Growth (%)	7.1%	4.4	n/a
Public Debt (%GDP)	67.5	79.3	n/a
% of Service Sector	57.9%	56.6	n/a
Inflation	2.2%	3.7	n/a

== Reactions ==
Ranil Wickremesinghe, Sri Lankan prime minister: "These five southern states have a population of 250 million and a combined GDP of $450 billion. With an addition of Sri Lanka $80 billion, the GDP in this sub regional economy will cross $500 billion,"

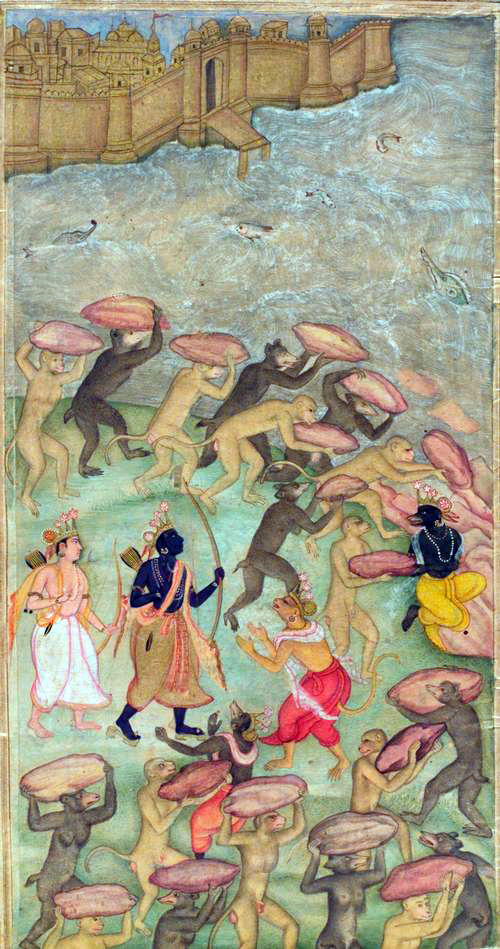
Rama's Bridge

Indian High Commissioner Y.K. Sinha: “They state a large number of Indians would come to Sri Lanka including barbers, lawyers and professors even and that they would take over Sri Lanka . . . These claims are amusing and completely untrue,”

Muhunthan Canagey –CEO of ICTA: "I would like to really know, do you really think the signing of ETCA will affect IT jobs in Sri Lanka? Are we Sri Lankans so inferior that we are so threatened to ensure doors are to be closed for IT professionals from India to come and join teams in Sri Lanka? Don’t you all think that in a world where software code is being developed all around the world and being delivered through the Internet, protecting IT professionals coming and working face to face with local teams is bad and will destroy us? Anyway, the work can be outsourced online."

GMOA member Dr. Haritha Aluthge: “We pointed out the kind of damage that will be posed to the Sri Lankan trade community. We were informed by the minister that they would finalize the ETCA only after reading the facts in the agreement and studying them,”

Members of the Young Lawyers Circle: “We also wish to tell the Government to stop signing this agreement which may have a disastrous impact on Sri Lanka’s labour force. According to available details, the Government has been compelled to sign this agreement secretly due to India’s urging. We demand that the government open an intellectual discussion on this agreement. As young lawyers, we demand that the government opens the agreement to the people and consult the professionals,”

Geethanjali Natraj, professor at the Indian Institute of Public Administration,“Given these states’ proximity to Sri Lanka, the ETCA would leverage Sri Lanka's unique geo-strategic location, which is at the crossroads of major shipping routes. The ETCA would also increase regional integration and could make Sri Lanka the geo-economic centre of South Asia."
