= Indians in Sri Lanka =

Indian diaspora in Sri Lanka

Total population
- 2,000,000 - 3,000,000 (recent emigration)

Regions with significant populations

Languages
- Tamil · Sinhala · Malayalam · Telugu · Hindi · English · Languages of India

Religion
- Hinduism · Other

Related ethnic groups
- Indian Tamils of Sri Lanka · Tamil people · Sri Lankan Tamils

Indians in Sri Lanka refer to Indians or people of Indian ancestry living in Sri Lanka, such as the Indian Tamils of Sri Lanka.

== History ==
Indian traders have been visiting and settling down in Sri Lanka for more than 2,500 years, Colombo Chetties are descendants of traders who had come to Sri Lanka during the Portuguese colonial era since 1505 CE. Sri Lankan monarchs have used the services of South Indian labor since centuries BCE. According to the primary source Mahavamsa, number service groups from Pandyan kingdom in present-day Tamil Nadu accompanied the settlement of Anuradhapura by Prakrit speakers. There is epigraphic evidence of traders and others self identifying as Damelas or Damedas (Sinhala and Sinhala prakrit for Tamils) in Anuradhapura and other areas of Sri Lanka as early as 2nd century BCE. The idea of looking upon the Demedas as aliens was not prevalent in the Early Historical Period.

== Ethnic groups ==
=== Indian Tamils of Sri Lanka ===
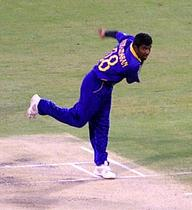
Muthiah Muralidaran, popular Sri Lankan cricketer of Indian Tamil descent

Indian Tamils of Sri Lanka are Tamil people of Indian origin in Sri Lanka. They are partly descended from workers sent from South India to Sri Lanka in the 19th and 20th centuries to work in coffee, tea and rubber plantations. Some also migrated on their own as merchants and as other service providers. These Tamil-speakers mostly live in the central highlands, also known as the Malayakam or Hill Country yet others are also found major urban areas and in the Northern province. Although they are all termed as Tamils today, some have Telugu and Malayalee origins as well as diverse South Indian caste origins. They are instrumental in the plantation sector economy of Sri Lanka. In general socio economically their standard of living is below that of the national average. In 1964 a large percentage were expatriated back to India but left a considerable number as stateless people. By the 1990s most of these have been given Sri Lankan citizenship. Most are Hindus with a minority of Christians and Muslims amongst them. Politically they are supportive of trade union derived political parties that have supported most of the ruling coalition since the 1980s.

=== Indian Moors ===
Before the 1911 Ceylon Census Moors in Sri Lanka were counted as one. From the census onwards they were divided into Indian Moors and Sri Lankan Moors. Indian Moors were brought to Sri Lanka for the same reasons as the Indian Tamils, as labourers to the plantations. In 1971 Indian Moors numbered 29,416 declining from 55,400 in 1963. Their decline was partly due to returning to India and some declaring themselves and being enumerated as Sri Lankan Moors. Indian Moors were mostly found in the Colombo and Kandy Districts.

=== Sri Lankan Chetty ===
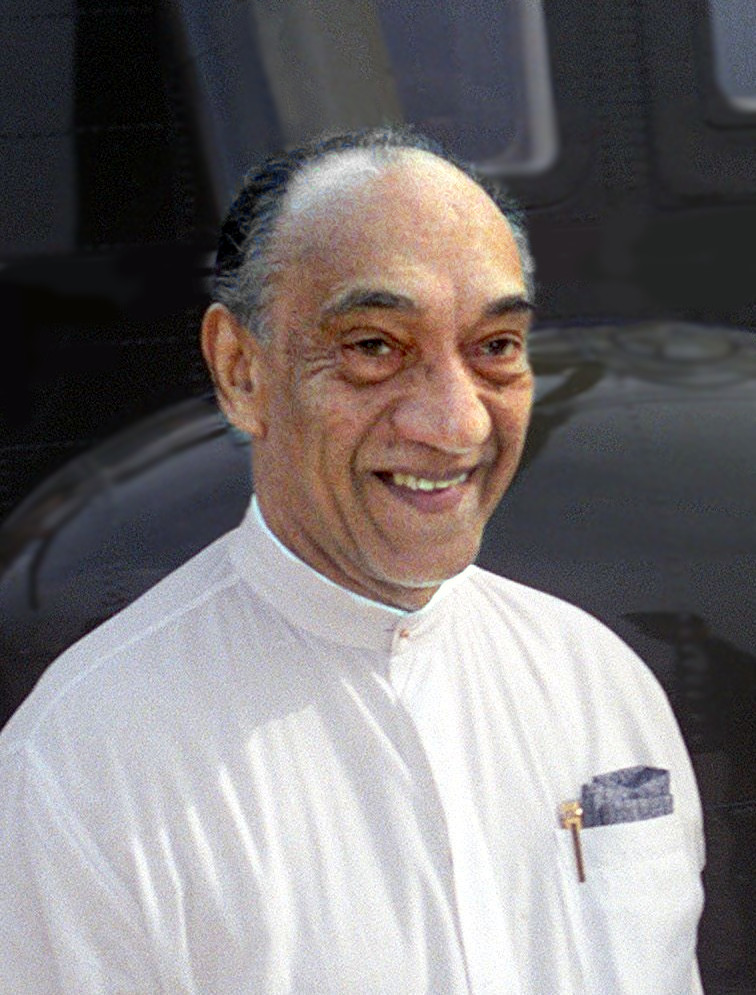
J. R. Jayewardene, the first executive President of Sri Lanka.

Sri Lankan Chetty, also known as Colombo Chetties, Colombo Chittis or Colombo Hetties, are a formerly endogamous Sri Lankan social group or caste. Colombo Chetty are mostly Roman Catholics or Anglicans and are found in almost all niches of Sri Lankan society. Members trace their origins to traders of various ethnicities from South India. Most traders were Tamil speakers with a smattering of Malayalee or Telugu speakers. Although Indian traders have been visiting and settling down in Sri Lanka for more than 2,500 years, Colombo Chetties are descendants of traders who had come to Sri Lanka during the Portuguese colonial era since 1505 CE.

There have been many prominent Sri Lankans of Chetty Ancestry, the first Executive President J. R. Jayewardene among them, whose ancestors had become Sinhalised.

=== Bharatha People ===
Bharathas also Bharatakula are a Sri Lankan caste of Paravar immigrants from Tamil Nadu in India. In India they were traditional fishers' merchants and traders. Most are Roman Catholics although a significant minority practice Hinduism.

Paravar are to be found all over Sri Lanka. Amongst Sri Lankan Tamils Paravar are still a fishing and trading caste although commonly confused with the Karaiyar. The Bharatas or Bharatakula identity is maintained by a relatively prosperous merchant group from India that settled amongst the Sinhalese in the Negombo area.

=== Sri Lankan Gypsy people ===
Sri Lankan Gypsy people are an ethnic group who trace their origins in India. They are a nomadic people who mostly speak in Telugu also known as Sri Lankan Gypsy Telugu, a Dravidian language natively spoken in the Andhra Pradesh. They make their living by fortune telling, snake charming and using animals in performances. Those who are settled in resettlement villages are subsistence farmers and farm hands to other farmers. They also speak Sinhalese or Tamil based on their area of settlement. Most seem to be settled in the eastern Batticaloa district.

=== Tivaru ===
Tivaru or Tiyya are said to be the first settlers of the Minocoy islands of Lakshadweepa off the Indian mainland. The origin of the Tivaru is unknown. Clarence Malony suggests that they could be Dravidians from southern India. Local oral tradition says that when Mahls came to these islands, the Tivaru who had already settled in these islands migrated to Sri Lanka, except for those who remained in Giraavaru. There are many Tamil Tivaru living on the Northern Coast lines especially on the Islands near to Jaffna Peninsula. Most of the settled down from Tamil Nadu between 13th Century and 18th Century AD. Vast majority of them belong to Maravars from Ramnad. Today almost every one identify themselves as Vellalars or Karaiyars.

== See also ==
- Sri Lankans in India
- India – Sri Lanka relations
