= Vembakkottai block =

Vembakottai is one of the largest crackers City in Sivakasi

Vembakkottai block is a taluka in the Virudhunagar district of Tamil Nadu, India. It has a total of 48 panchayat villages.
