= N. Sreedharan =

Indian politician (1928–1985)

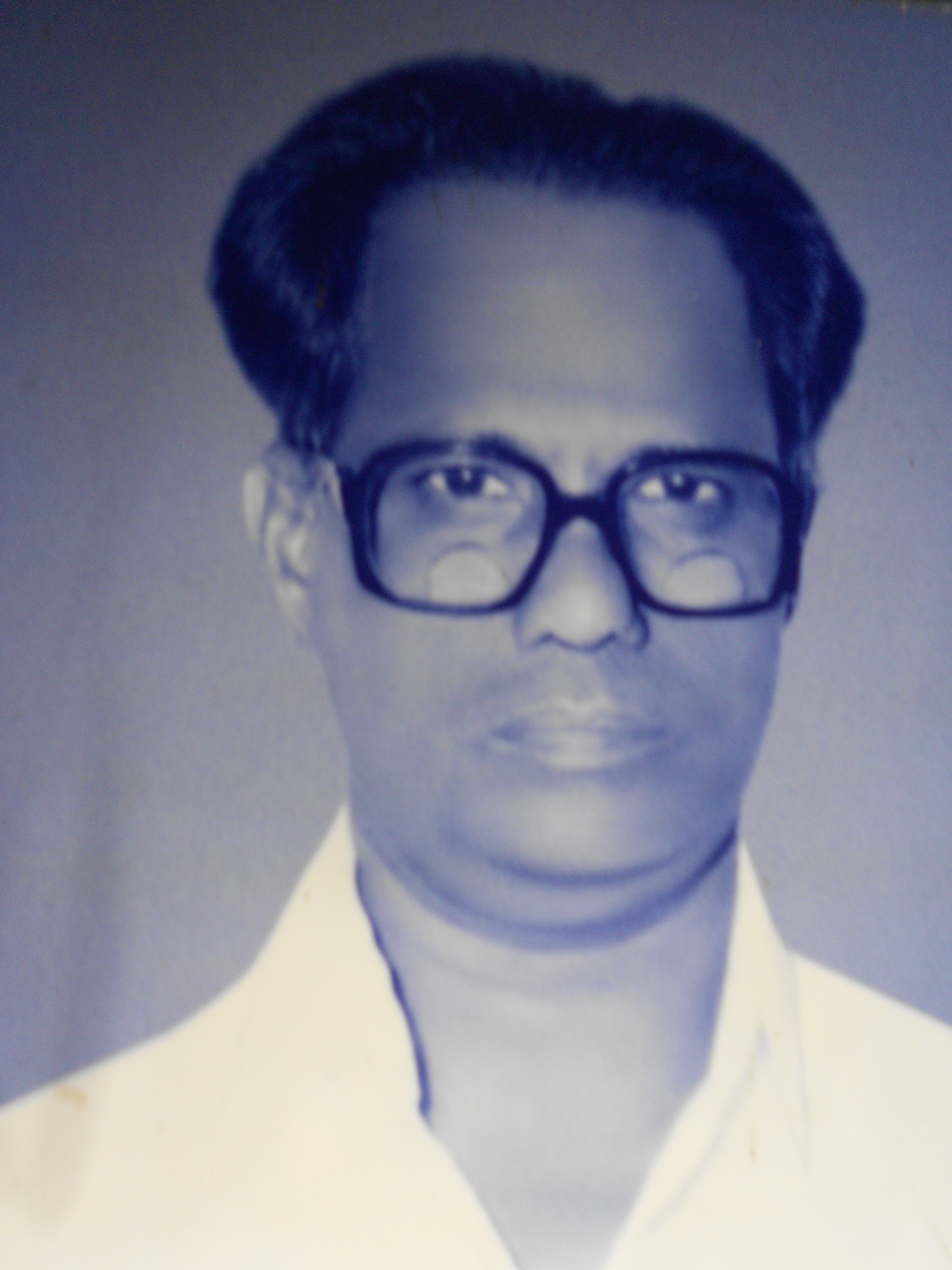
- N. Sreedharan
- Born: 1928 (age 97–98); Vallikkavu, Kollam
- Known for: Kayamkulam DC Secretary, Karthikappally taluk Secretary, District Asst. Secretary, Acting Secretary of Alappuzha DC in 1958; In CPI(M), Secretary of Alappuzha, Kollam and member of State Secretariat
- Political party: CPI(M)
- Spouse: T V PADMAVATHY

N. Sreedharan (1928–1985), popularly known as NS, was one of the chief organisers of Communist Party in Central Travancore and former CPI(M) secretariat member.

== Early life ==
Born to a canoeist in Vallikkavu, Sreedharan was attracted to the national movement at very young stage. He started his life as a beedi worker.

== Political work ==
He became a leader of seamen and a communist organiser. He was one of the pioneers of communist movement in Central Travancore region. He took part in freedom movement and after freedom in the communist movement and had suffered the oppression of authorities many times. Though he didn't hold any posts in the government, he became a widely popular leader. In 1940s, he was the secretary of communist party cell. Then he became one of the four members of first Kayamkulam DC, then its secretary, Karthikappally taluk secretary, district assistant secretary, acting secretary of Alappuzha DC in 1958. After the formation of CPI(M), he had worked as the secretary of Alappuzha, Kollam and as a member of state secretariat. He had worked for popularising Deshabhimani newspaper.

== Death ==
He died in an accident on 17 February 1985 at Kottarakkara. N. S. Memorial Institute of Medical Sciences, a co-operative hospital was built later in his memory at Palathara in Kolam.

== See also ==
- N. S. Memorial Institute of Medical Sciences, Palathara, Kollam
