= Pamban Bridge =

Railway bridge connecting Pamban Island to mainland India

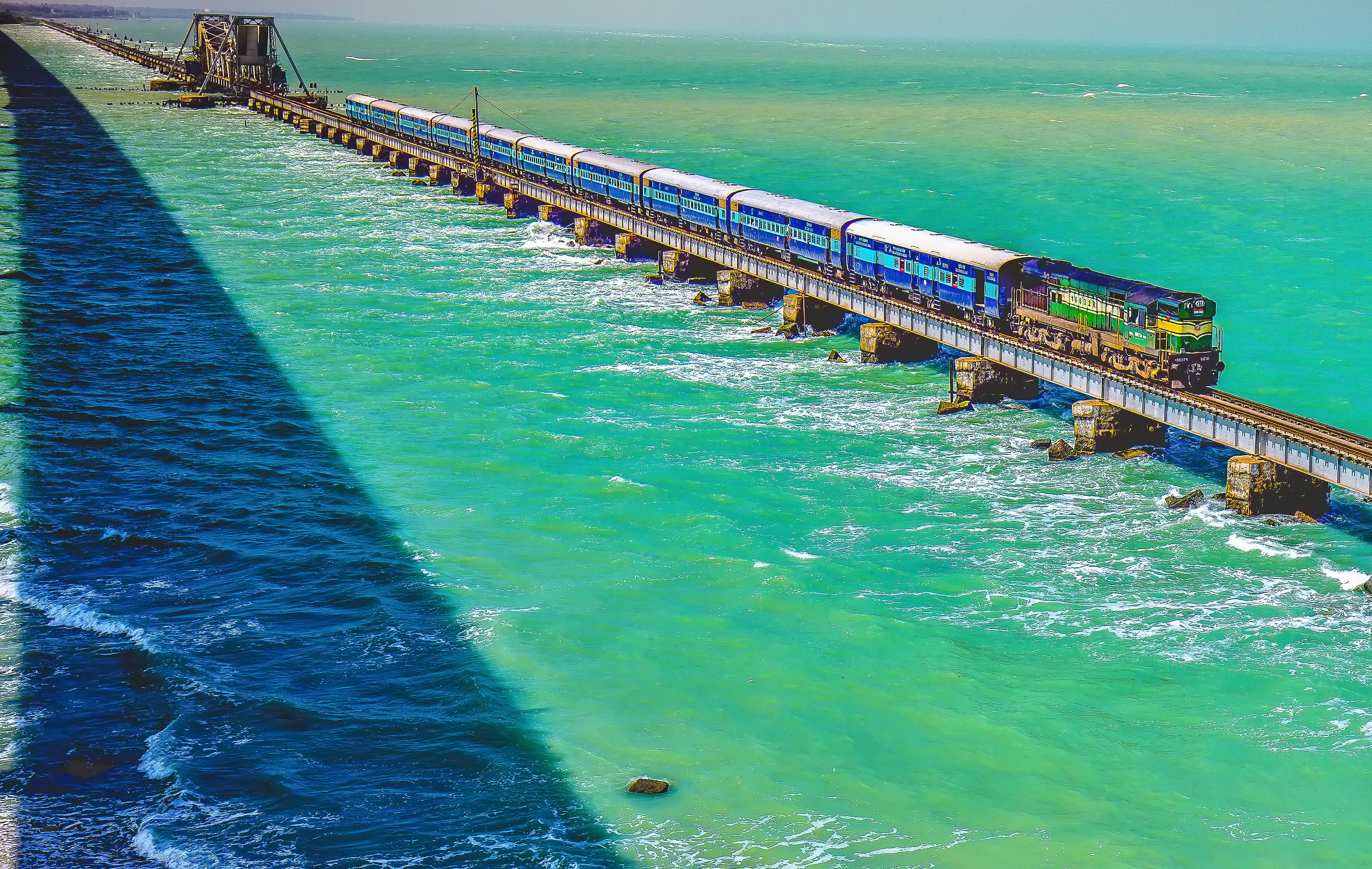
- A train on the Pamban bridge in 2016
- Coordinates: 9°16′57.25″N 79°12′5.91″E
- Carries: Rail
- Locale: Rameswaram, Tamil Nadu, India
- Owner: Indian Railways

Characteristics
- Total length: 2,065 m (6,775 ft)
- No. of spans: 144

Rail characteristics
- No. of tracks: 1
- Track gauge: Broad gauge
- Electrified: Rigid Overhead Catenary System

History
- Construction start: August 1911
- Construction end: February 1914
- Opened: 24 February 1914
- Closed: 23 December 2022
- Replaced by: New Pamban Bridge

Statistics
- Daily traffic: Suspended

Location
- Interactive map of Pamban Bridge

Pamban Bridge (Tamil: [paːmbɐn], romanised: pāmban) was a railway bridge that connected the town of Rameswaram on Pamban Island with Mandapam in mainland India. Opened on 24 February 1914, it was India's first sea bridge, and was the longest sea bridge in India until the opening of the Bandra–Worli Sea Link in 2010. It was a conventional bridge resting on concrete piers with a double-leaf bascule section midway, which could be raised to let ships and barges pass through.

The Pamban bridge was the only surface transport link that connected Rameswaram to the mainland India until 1988, when a road bridge was constructed parallel to the railway bridge. In 2020, construction of a new bridge closer to the existing one began which was planned to eventually replace the existing bridge. In December 2022, rail transportation on the bridge was suspended permanently as the bascule section had weakened significantly due to corrosion.

== History ==
Plans for a bridge to connect to mainland was suggested in 1870 as the British Administration sought ways to increase trade with Ceylon. The construction began in August 1911. The bridge was opened for traffic on 24 February 1914 and connected Rameshwaram in Pamban Island with mainland India.

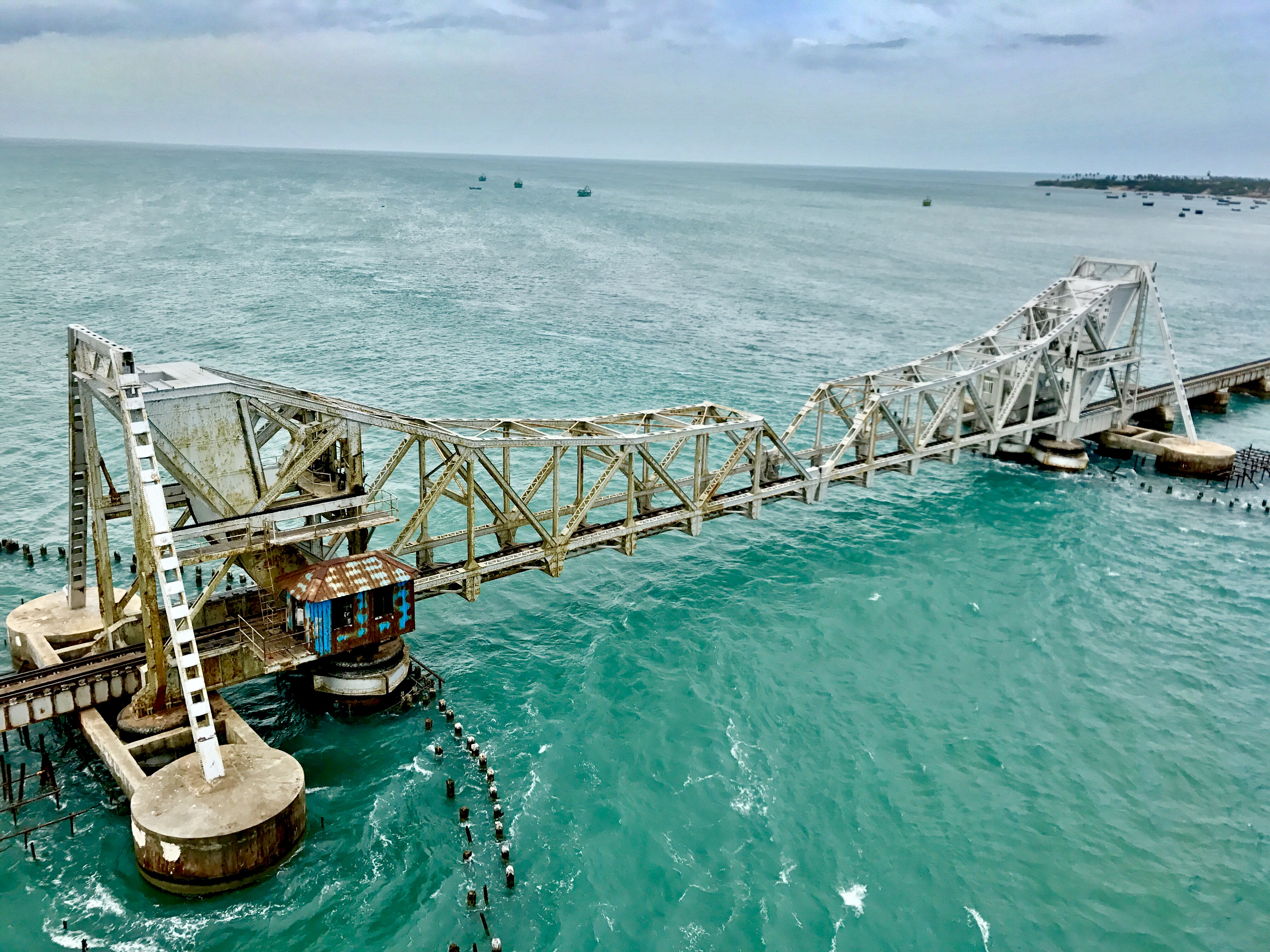
Lifting spans allow small ships to pass through

The bridge was damaged during the 1964 Rameswaram cyclone and required extensive repair work. The adjacent road bridge was opened in 1988. In 2009, further strengthening work was carried out on the bridge under the supervision of E. Sreedharan to enable it to withstand heavier freight trains. On 13 January 2013, the bridge required repair work to the piers after suffering a minor damage from a naval barge. In 2016, the Ministry of Railways sanctioned ₹250 million (equivalent to ₹390 million or US$4.2 million in 2026) to replace the existing 65.23 m (214.0 ft) long rolling type span with a 66 m (217 ft) long single truss span which could be opened automatically. In December 2018, train movement was halted to carry out repairs when a fissure was noticed on one of the spans and rail movement on the bridge was restored in March 2019.

In 2020, the Government of India announced that a new railway bridge will be constructed near the old Pamban Bridge at a cost of ₹2.5 billion (equivalent to ₹3.2 billion or US$34 million in 2026). In December 2022, rail transportation on the bridge was suspended permanently as the bascule section had weakened significantly due to corrosion and in February 2023, the Indian Railways announced that the train traffic to Rameswaram would be restored once the new bridge is completed. The New Pamban Bridge was completed in 2024 and was opened for traffic in April 2025.

In January 2026, the Indian railways announced plans for dismantling the old bridge starting with the central span and the bascule section. On 29 January 2026, a crane used in the dismantling process collapsed at the mouth of the bridge, which had to be righted before the process was restarted.

== Location ==
The Pamban railway bridge spans a 2.06 km (1.28 mi) wide strait between the Indian mainland and Pamban Island. The bridge is located in a corrosive marine environment, making its maintenance a challenging job. The location is also a cyclone-prone, high-wind-velocity zone.

== Design ==
The railway bridge is located 12.5 m (41 ft) above sea level and is 2,065 m (6,776 ft) long. The bridge consists of 143 piers and has a double-leaf bascule section with a Scherzer rolling type lift span that can be raised to let ships pass. Each half of the lifting span weighs 415 t (457 tons). The two leaves of the bridge are opened manually using levers and took 45 minutes each to lift and drop.

== Rail transport ==
A metre-gauge railway ran along the bridge since its inception in 1914 till 2007 when it was upgraded to a 5ft 6in broad gauge line. The railway line connected Mandapam in mainland India and the Pamban island via the bridge. Earlier, the railway line had bifurcated from Pamban, with a 10.06 km (6.25 mi) line heading towards Rameshwaram and another 24 km (15 mi) branch line terminating at Dhanushkodi. The railway line to Dhanushkodi was destroyed during 1964 Dhanushkodi cyclone along with the Pamban-Dhanuskodi passenger train, killing around 200 people.

== See also ==
- List of longest bridges
- List of longest bridges above water in India
