= Reggie Candappa =

Sri Lankan media personality (1919–2003)

- Born: May 14, 1919; Colombo, Sri Lanka
- Died: December 6, 2003 (aged 84)
- Occupation: Founder chairman of Grant McCann Erickson
- Spouse: Therese Candappa (nee Senadheera)
- Children: Neela Marikkar; Sriyani Tidball
- Website: Reggie Candappa Foundation for the Arts

Reginald Sebastian Rodrigo Candappa (Tamil: ரெஜி கந்தப்பா; 1919–2003) was a Sri Lankan media personality and founder chairman of Sri Lanka's biggest advertising agency, Grant McCann Erickson.

== Biography ==
Reggie Candappa was born in 1919 to father A.R. Candappa, a Colombo Chetty and mother Kalubowila Arachchige Dona Alice, a Sinhalese.

The young Reggie Candappa was given away by his father after the death of Dona Alice when the infant Reggie was just three months old on the grounds that the cause of her death was the infant according to his horoscope. Candappa studied at St. Joseph's Catholic College, where his creative talent was recognised by the influential teacher J. P. de Fonseka. Fonseka got Candappa work as an illustrator in the school magazine and of books by a Catholic priest. He subsequently studied architecture, getting work with the local architect S. Shanmuganathan on the strength of his portfolio of drawings.

=== Career ===
During World War II his family moved to Eheliyagoda, where he worked as a freelance artist and illustrator, soon becoming a prolific designer of advertisements. After the war, he decided to set up his own office. His business rapidly expanded, and he soon had several artists working under him. He quickly developed contacts with the British administration, and was asked to design a crest for the Royal Air Force. He also helped to set up and run the magazine Lanka. In 1946, needing a steady job after his marriage, he joined Lake House, the home of the Associated Newspapers of Ceylon, where he worked for twelve years. He later stated,

It was a great opening for me. I was trained in printing, print production, wrote articles, drew political cartoons, and illustrated the Sunday Observer. I became famous, and ended up with four desks, in the Advertising Department, Art Department, Engraving Department and the lithographic Department.

In 1957 he got a scholarship to work in America and to learn the latest techniques of American advertising and design. At the same time, he was offered a job with Grant Advertising which he took up while working his scholarship at the Grant offices in Chicago and Hollywood. He was given the job of setting up a new branch of Grant's in Colombo. He quickly built up the business, which he later bought, running it as an independent advertising agency under the name Grant McCann Erickson.

== Art ==
In addition to his business activities Candappa was also a painter. He held four one-man shows. In 1988 he received the "Kalapathy" award from the Ceylon Society of Arts. In 1993 he was awarded the "Deshabandu", a national honour. He is a trustee of the Ceylon Society of Arts.

== Personal life ==
Candappa married Therese Senadheera, the daughter of a member of the Gate Mudaliyar, who disapproved of the match and attempted to force their daughter to marry someone else. The couple eloped, but continued to have problems caused by the disapproval of her family. The couple remained married until Therese' death. The couple had two daughters. Their daughter Neela Marikkar took over from her father as chair of Grant McCann Erickson. He died of a heart attack in 2003.
