= V. Kanakasabhai =

Visvanatha Kanakasabhai Pillai
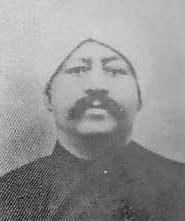
- Born: 25 May 1855; Madras, Madras Presidency, Company India (now Chennai, Tamil Nadu, India)
- Died: 21 February 1906 (aged 50); Conjeevaram, Madras Presidency, British India (now Kanchipuram, Tamil Nadu, India)
- Occupations: Historian, lawyer

Visvanatha Kanakasabhai Pillai (1855–1906) was an Indian lawyer, historian and Dravidologist of Sri Lankan Tamil descent. He was the first person to attempt a chronology of ancient Tamil Nadu. He was also one of the first people to deduce the references to a long-submerged legendary continent, Kumari Kandam, in texts such as Silappadhikkaram.

== Ancestry ==
Kanakasabhai was born in Komaleeswaranpet, a locality in present-day Chennai, Tamil Nadu, India on 25 May 1855. His ancestors hailed from Mallakam, a town near Jaffna, Northern Province, British Ceylon. Kanakasabhai's father V.Visvanatha Pillai, author of Tamil-English dictionary, from Mallakam.

== Early life and education ==
Kanakasabhai graduated in arts from Presidency College, Madras and joined the Indian Postal Service.

Kanakasabhai was a lawyer but developed a keen interest in Tamil history and after practising for a few years, he left the profession and became a full-time historian.

== Kumari Kandam ==
From 1895 onwards, Kanakasabhai published a series of articles in the Madras Review about a long-submerged land that lay to the south of Cape Comorin. These theories of his were based on ancient Tamil and Buddhist sources. These papers were subsequently published in his book The Tamils Eighteen Hundred Years Ago.

Three years later, in an editorial in the Siddhanta Deepika, Nallaswami Pillai hinted that Lemuria was the long lost land of Kumari Kandam.

== The Tamils Eighteen Hundred Years ago ==
In 1904, Kanakasabhai published his magnum opus, The Tamils Eighteen Hundred Years Ago. Dedicated to Sir S. Subramania Iyer, the book was made up of sixteen chapters, each of which examined the life, culture, geography, trade, religion and philosophy of the ancient Tamil country based on the descriptions in two ancient Sangam epics, the Silappatikaram and the Manimekalai. The book is considered to be a classic and as one of the first notable efforts to research the history of Sangam period Tamil Nadu.

Kanakasabhai postulated entirely new pathbreaking theories in his book. He was the first person to suggest the existence of a Kumari Kandam based on his reading of the Silappatikaram. He also claimed that the Tamils were originally settlers from Bengal and that the word "Tamil" itself was derived from the ancient port of Tamralipta. He postulated a new theory that the Dravidian upper classes originally hailed from Mongolia.

Kanakasabhai was the first historian to attempt a systematic chronology of Tamil history. Kanakasabhai believed that the Sangam age might have flourished even in the 2nd century AD. He based these claims on the Gajabahu synchronism proposed by Seshagiri Sastriyar.The Tamils Eighteen Hundred Years Ago also had anti-Brahminical overtones. Kanakasabhai accused Tholkappiyar of a conscious attempt to "foist caste system on the Tamils".

== Criticism ==
Kanakasabhai's claims of Mongolian origin for Tamils and the relation of the word "Tamil" with Tamralipti have invited sharp criticism from contemporary historians. At the Madras Presidency College lectures in 1896, a European said that Kanakasabhai's claims demonstrated the "comparative worthlessness of Hindu history".

== Works ==
- The Great Twin Epics of Tamil.
- Desikachariar. Dravidian kingdom:The conquest of Bengal and Burma.
- The Tamils Eighteen Hundred Years ago . Higginbotham's. 1904.
