= Mandapam =

- town
- Location in Tamil Nadu, India
- Coordinates: 9.28°N 79.12°E
- Country: India
- State: Tamil Nadu
- District: Ramanathapuram
- Elevation: 9 m (30 ft)

Population (2001)
  - Total: 15,799

Languages
  - Official: Tamil
- Time zone: UTC+5:30 (IST)
- Postal code: 623518

Mandapam is a panchayat town in Ramanathapuram district in the Indian state of Tamil Nadu. The famed Pamban Railway bridge and Vehicular bridge lie to the East of this Panchayat Town. Mandapam is Tamil Nadu’s largest refugee camp for Sri Lankans in India.

== Geography ==
Mandapam is located at 9.28°N 79.12°E. It has an average elevation of 9 metres (29 feet).

== Demographics ==
As of 2001 India census, Mandapam had a population of 15,799. Males constitute 51% of the population and females 49%. Mandapam has an average literacy rate of 71%, higher than the national average of 59.5%: male literacy is 75%, and female literacy is 66%. In Mandapam, 13% of the population is under 6 years of age. The main occupation of the people living here is fishing. Part of the fish caught here is sold in Southern Tamil Nadu and the rest is sold to exporters.
