= Neela Marikkar =

Sri Lankan executive

- Born: Colombo, Sri Lanka
- Occupation: Chairman / Managing Director Dentus Grant Group
- Spouse: Zarook Marikkar
- Children: Leah Marikkar; Tasha Marikkar
- Website: Neela family

Neela Marikkar is the Chairperson of Dentsu Grant Group (formally Grant McCann Erickson), a leading Communications Group in Sri Lanka in partnership with Dentsu and Dentsu Aegis Network.

== Biography ==
Neela is a daughter of the Sri Lankan media personality Reggie Candappa and wife Therese Candappa.

== Peace activist ==
Neela has served as Chairperson of various institutions in the business sector including the Committee on Communication and Social Mobilization of the National Advisory Council for Peace and Reconciliation in Sri Lanka.

She is the president of Sri Lanka First, an influential group of corporate leaders who promote a peaceful settlement by negotiation between the Government of Sri Lanka and the Liberation Tigers of Tamil Eelam.

== Consultant to UNDP ==
Neela was a consultant to UNDP’s Invest-in-peace Program to help revive the country’s war affected economy. She led a group of Sri Lankan Business leaders to South Africa to study the role business played in their peace process and post conflict reconstruction.

== Women activist ==
Neela served in the Women Waging Peace Network and at their Colloquium, she was invited to be a speaker on the role of women in peace building at the John F. Kennedy School of Government, Harvard University.
