= Sri Lankans in India =

Tamil people of Sri Lankan origin

Regions with significant populations
- Tamil Nadu · Kerala · Delhi · Pondicherry · Maharashtra · Andaman and Nicobar Islands · Karnataka · Andhra Pradesh · Odisha · Chhattisgarh · West Bengal · Uttar Pradesh · Jharkhand · Bihar · Gujarat · Assam · Goa

Languages
- Tamil · Sinhala · English

Religion
- Hinduism · Roman Catholicism · Buddhism

Related ethnic groups
- Sri Lankan

Sri Lankans in India mainly refer to Tamil people of Sri Lankan origin in India and non resident Sri Lankans. They are partly who migrated to India and their descendants and mostly refugees from Sri Lanka because of the recently concluded Sri Lankan Civil War. There is also a small population of Sinhalese people in India, numbering about 3,500 and mostly located in Delhi and Chennai. According to the records of the Union Ministry of Home Affairs, as of 1 January 2021, there were 58,843 Sri Lankan refugees staying in 108 refugee camps in Tamil Nadu and 54 in Odisha.

== History ==
=== Early arrivals ===
During 19th century and early 20th century some Sri Lankan Tamils especially from Jaffna migrated or settled in India for various reasons such as education, employment in the British Indian government, business and other reasons.

=== Sri Lankan refugees ===
The Sri Lankan refugees arrived in Tamil Nadu in four waves. The first wave on 24 July 1983, after Black July, to the 29 July 1987 up until the Indo-Sri Lanka Accord, 134,053 Sri Lankan Tamils arrived in India. The first repatriation took place after the signing of the Indo-Sri Lanka Accord in 1987 and between 24 December 1987 and 31 August 1989, 25,585 refugees and non-camp Sri Lankan nationals returned to Sri Lanka. The second wave began with the start of Eelam War II after 25 August 1989, where 122,000 Sri Lankan Tamils came to Tamil Nadu. On 20 January 1992, after the assassination of Rajiv Gandhi 54,188 refugees were voluntarily repatriated to Sri Lanka, until March 1995. Eelam War III commenced in April 1995 starting the third wave or refugees. By 12 April 2002, nearly 23,356 refugees had come to Tamil Nadu. The flow of refugees had stopped in 2002 because of the cease fire agreement.

Between January 2017 and August 2020, 57 Sri Lankans became Indian citizens through naturalization.

== Demographics ==
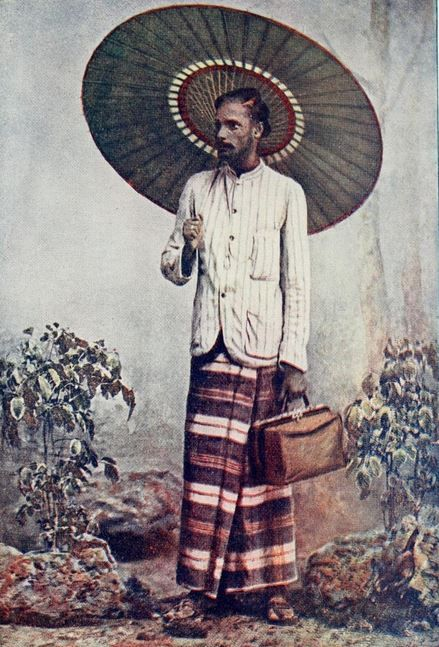
A Sinhalese man in Mumbai, India, 1897

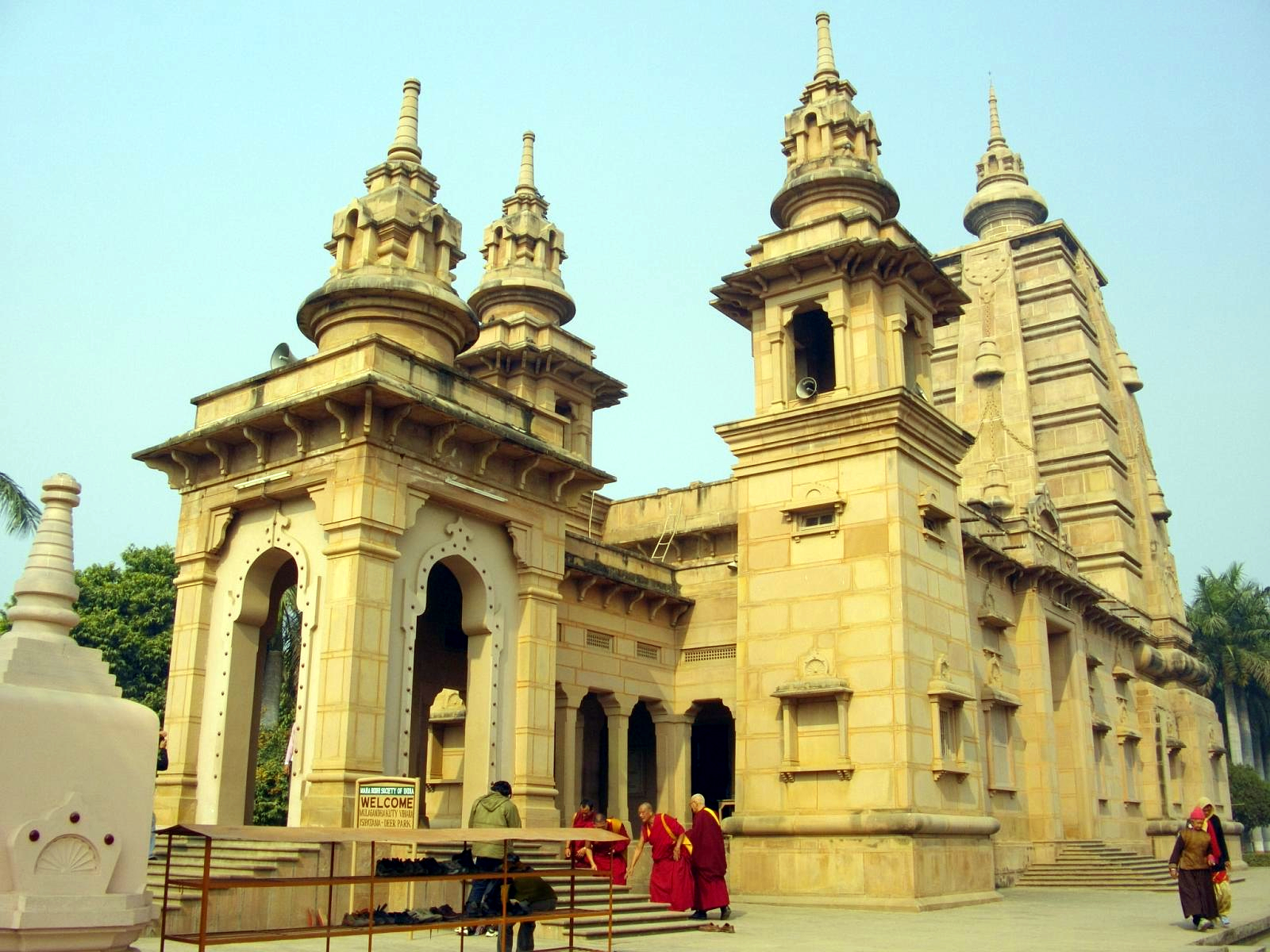
Mulagandhakuti Vihara, Sri Lankan Buddhist temple at Sarnath

=== Tamil people ===
Sri Lankan Tamils in India number in the hundreds of thousands, mostly in the state of Tamil Nadu, the closest state to Sri Lanka and the easiest to get to. There is also a considerable number in the city of Trivandrum, with around 2,700 refugee families. There are also a number of Sri Lankan Tamils in the eastern regions of Orissa, Karnataka and Pondicherry.

=== Sinhalese people ===
There are a small number of Sinhalese people in India, scattered all around the country, but mainly living in and around the northern and southern regions. Delhi has the largest concentration Sinhalese people in north India with 1,100, the states of Tamil Nadu, Maharashtra have 5,800 and 2,400 respectively. There are an estimated 2,000 families in the city of Chennai, many of them who are employees of the Sri Lankan Deputy High Commission or work for banking companies. Some are also pursuing higher education. The Andaman and Nicobar Islands and the state of Gujarat have 200 each while other states such as Andhra Pradesh, Kerala, Karnataka, West Bengal, Jharkhand have populations ranging from 60 to 30 people.

== Notable people ==
- J. P. Chandrababu
- V. Kanakasabhai
- Balu Mahendra
- E. M. V. Naganathan
- Arumuka Navalar
- M. G. Ramachandran
- J. K. Rithesh
- Donald Rutnam
- Jacqueline Fernandez

== See also ==
- List of Sri Lankan Tamils in India
- Sri Lankan Tamil people
- Sri Lankan Tamils in Indian cinema
- Tamil diaspora
- Mandapam Camp
- India–Sri Lanka relations
