= Coastline of Tamil Nadu =

Coastline of the Indian state

The coastline of Tamil Nadu is located on the southeast coast of Indian Peninsula, and forms a part of Coromandel Coast of Bay of Bengal through Pearl Fishery Coast of Indian Ocean and ends near Malabar Coast. It is 1069 km long and is the second longest coastline in the country after Gujarat. Chennai, the capital of the state and an important commercial and industrial center in the country is located in the northern part of the coast with Kanniyakumari, forming the southern tip where Indian Ocean, Bay of Bengal and Arabian Sea meet. It also shares maritime border with Sri Lanka across the Palk Strait in Gulf of Mannar. The coastal corridor consists of 14 districts with 15 major ports and harbors, sandy beaches, lakes and river estuaries. Tamil Nadu is the only state in India with territory on both the eastern and western coastlines.

== Geography ==
The coastal stretch extends for 906 km (563 mi) from Pazhaverkadu of Thiruvallur district to Ezhudesam of Kanniyakumari district. Kanniyakumari, forms the southernmost tip of the mainland of the Indian subcontinent where Indian Ocean, Bay of Bengal and Arabian Sea meet. Pamban Island forms part of Ramanathapuram district separating Gulf of Mannar and Palk Strait with the Ram Setu connecting it with Sri Lanka. There are 14 districts that share the coastline namely Thiruvallur, Chennai, Chengalpattu, Villupuram, Cuddalore, Mayildathurai, Nagapattinam, Tiruvarur, Thanjavur, Pudukottai, Ramanathapuram, Thoothukudi, Tirunelveli and Kanyakumari.

== History ==
Chola conquests during Rajendra Chola I

The coast of Tamil Nadu was a part of ancient silk route and played an important role in spice trade with western empires. Roman and Greek traders frequented the ancient Tamil country securing trade with the seafaring Tamil states of the Pandyan, Chola and Chera dynasties and establishing trading settlements which secured trade with South Asia by the Greco-Roman world since the time of the Ptolemaic dynasty a few decades before the start of the Common Era and remained long after the fall of the Western Roman Empire. Major ports included Uraiyur, Korkai, Poompuhar and Kaveripattinam. The ancient city of Poompuhar was destroyed by the sea around 300 BCE.

During the reign of Raja Raja Chola I and his successors Rajendra Chola I, Virarajendra Chola and Kulothunga Chola I the armies of the Chola Dynasty invaded Sri Lanka, Maldives and some parts of Southeast Asia like Malaysia, Indonesia and Southern Thailand of the Sri Vijaya Empire in the 11th century. Raja Raja Chola I launched several naval campaigns that resulted in the capture of Sri Lanka, Maldives and the Malabar Coast. In 1025, Rajendra Chola, the Chola king from Coromandel in South India, launched naval raids on ports of Srivijaya in Southeast Asia and against the Burmese kingdom of Pegu, and conquered parts of Srivijaya in Malaysia and Indonesia and the Tambralinga Kingdom in Southern Thailand and occupied it for some time. A second invasion was led by Virarajendra Chola of the Chola dynasty who conquered kedah in Malaysia of Sri Vijaya in the late 11th century.

== Sea-trade ==
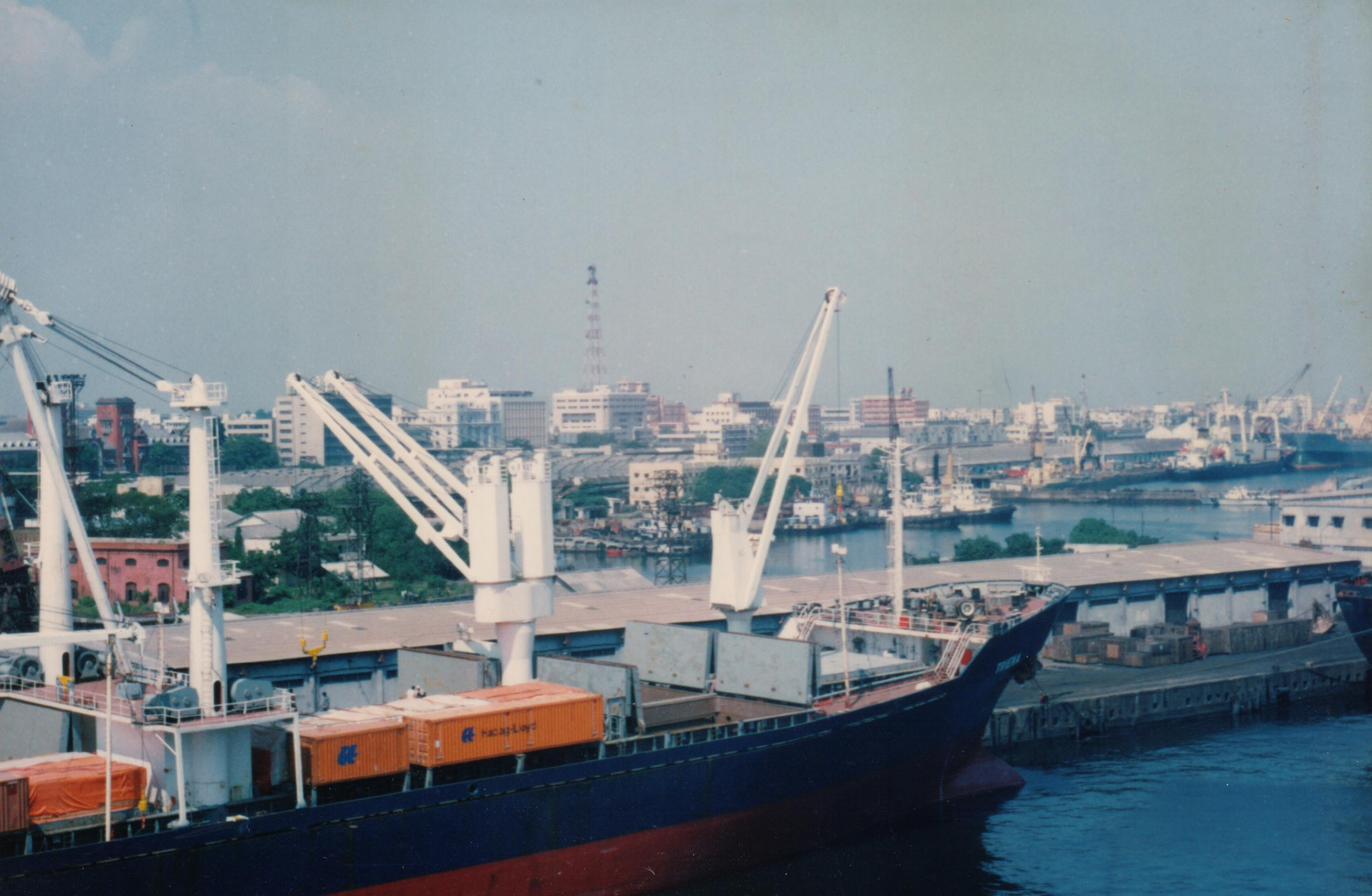
Container terminal at Chennai port

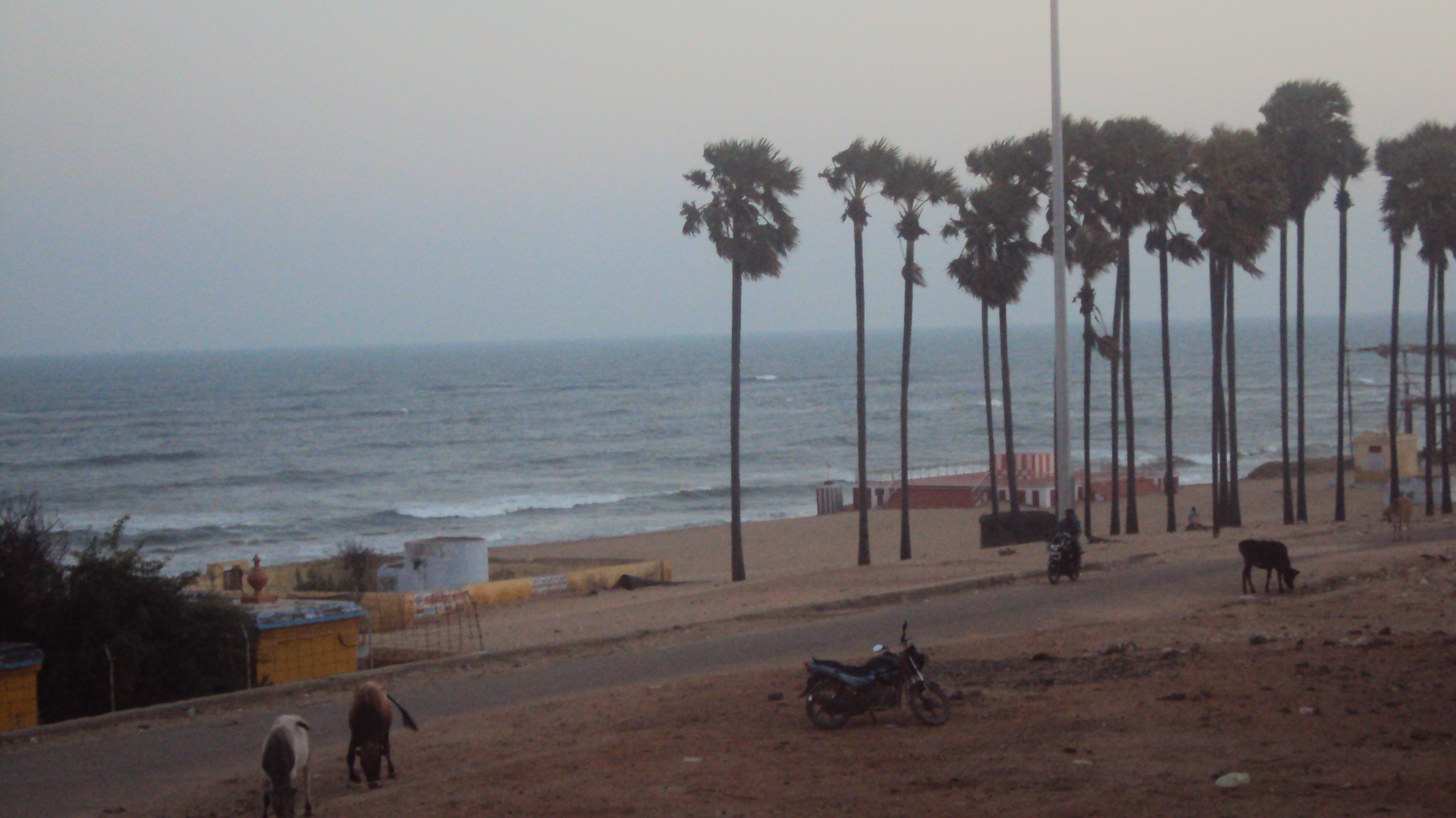
Seashore in Tiruchendur

Tamil Nadu has major seaports at Chennai, Ennore, Tuticorin and Nagapattinam. There are 11 other minor ports. Chennai Port is an artificial harbor and is India's second busiest container hub.

Because of its shallow waters, Sethusamudram—the sea separating Sri Lanka from India—presents a hindrance to navigation through the Palk Strait. Though trade across the India-Sri Lanka divide has been active since at least the first millennium BCE, it has been limited to small boats and dinghies. Larger oceangoing vessels coming from the West have had to navigate around Sri Lanka to reach India' eastern coast. The Sethusamudram Shipping Canal Project is a proposed project to create a shipping route in the shallow straits between India and Sri Lanka which would provide a continuously navigable sea route around the Indian Peninsula.

== Fishing and aquaculture ==
The state has a fishermen population of 1.05 million and the coast consists of 3 major fishing harbors, 3 medium fishing harbors and 363 fish landing centers. The marine fishing output from the state contributes to 10-12 % of the total marine fish production in India and is estimated at 0.72 million tonnes. Aquaculture include shrimp, sea weed, mussel, clam and oyster farming.

There have been several alleged incidents of Sri Lankan Navy personnel firing on Indian fishermen fishing in the Palk Strait, where India and Sri Lanka are only separated by 12 nautical miles. Indian Government protests periodically against Sri Lankan navy for its alleged involvement in attacks on Indian fishermen. The incidents continue to happen and over 530 fishermen have been killed in the last 30 years.

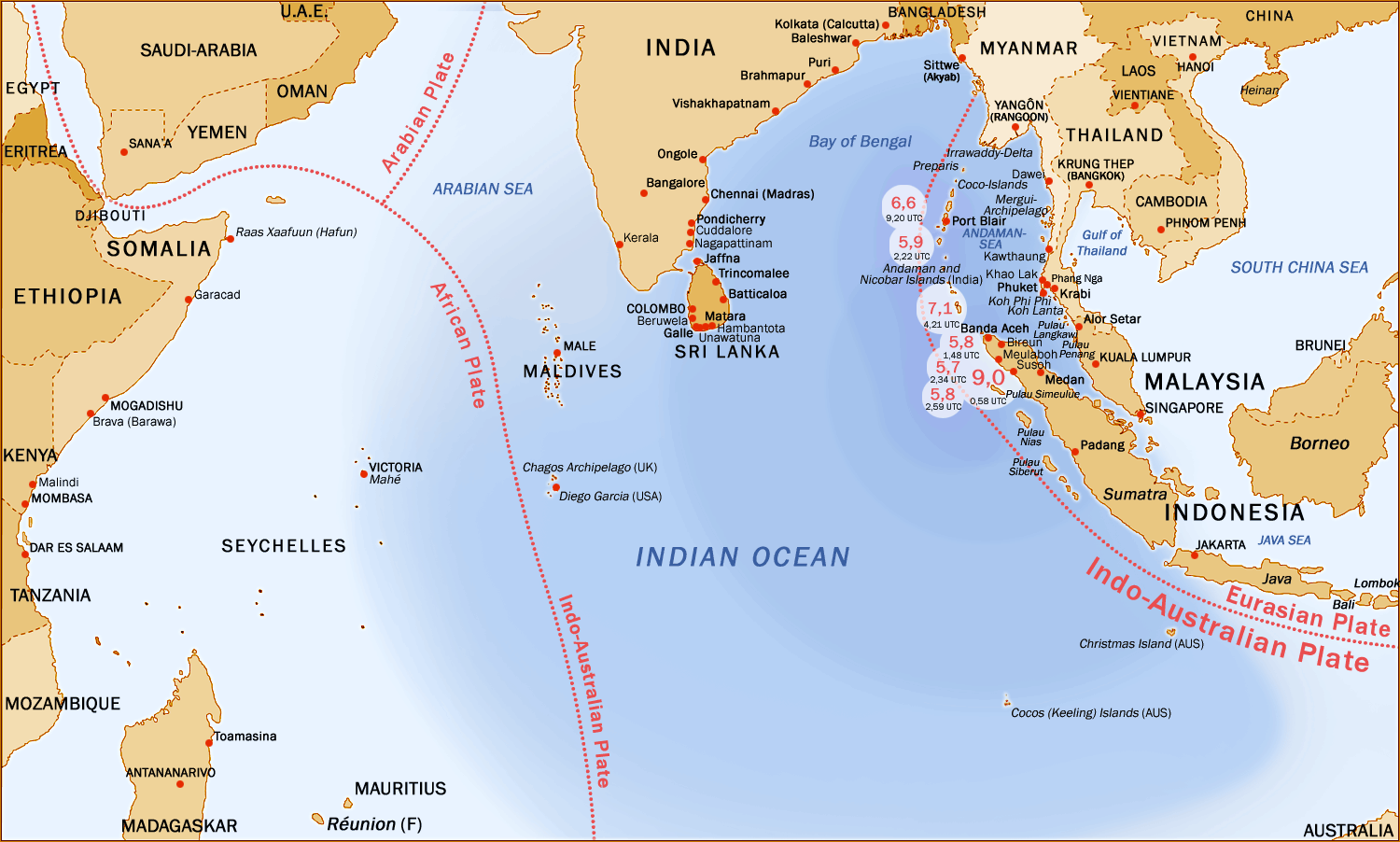
Countries affected by the 2004 Indian Ocean earthquake

== Weather patterns ==
The Bay of Bengal is responsible for the formation of some of the strongest and deadliest tropical cyclones in the world. The basin is mostly affected by tropical cyclones.

According to official estimates, more than 10,000 people were killed and hundreds of thousands made homeless when a tsunami triggered by the 2004 Indian Ocean earthquake near the Indonesian island of Sumatra struck the southern coast of Tamil Nadu on 26 December 2004. The earthquake registered 9.1–9.3 M_{w}, and was the largest in five decades.

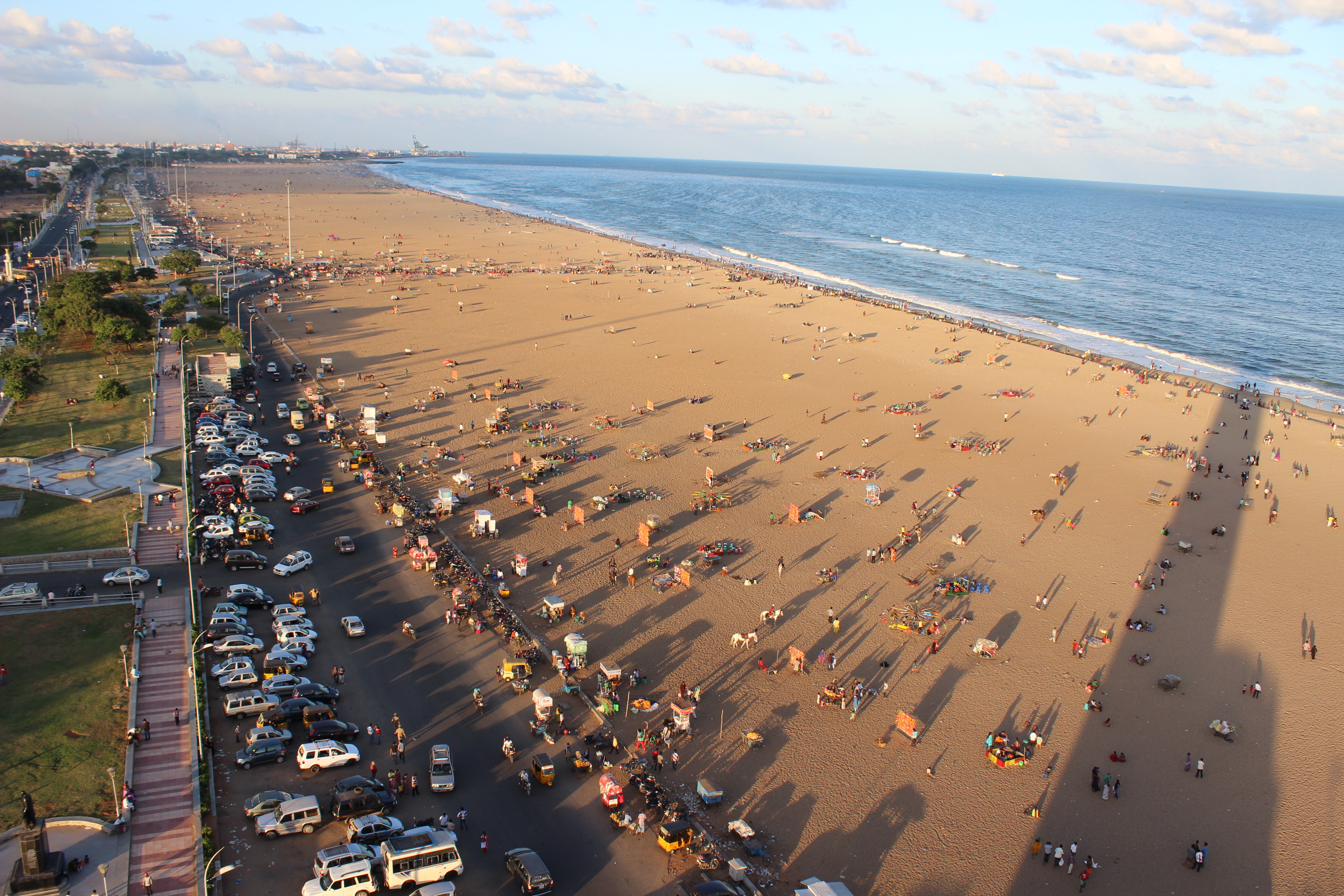
View of marina beach from the lighthouse

== Beaches ==
There are numerous beaches along the coast. Marina Beach in Chennai covering a distance of 13 km (8.1 mi), is the longest natural urban beach in the country and the world's second longest.

== Flora and fauna ==
The Gulf of Mannar Marine National Park is a protected area of India consisting of 21 small islands (islets) and adjacent coral reefs in the Gulf of Mannar. It lies between Thoothukudi and Dhanushkodi. It is the core area of the Gulf of Mannar Biosphere Reserve which includes a 10 km buffer zone around the park, including the populated coastal area. The park has a high diversity of plants and animals in its marine, intertidal and near shore habitats. About 510 (23%) of the 2,200 fin fish species in Indian waters are found in the Gulf, making it the most highly diverse fish habitat in India.

== See also ==
- Ma'bar Coast
- Pearl Fishery Coast
- Coromandel Coast
