= Kothandaramaswamy Temple =

Hindu shrine

Coordinates: 9.2333°N 79.3480°E

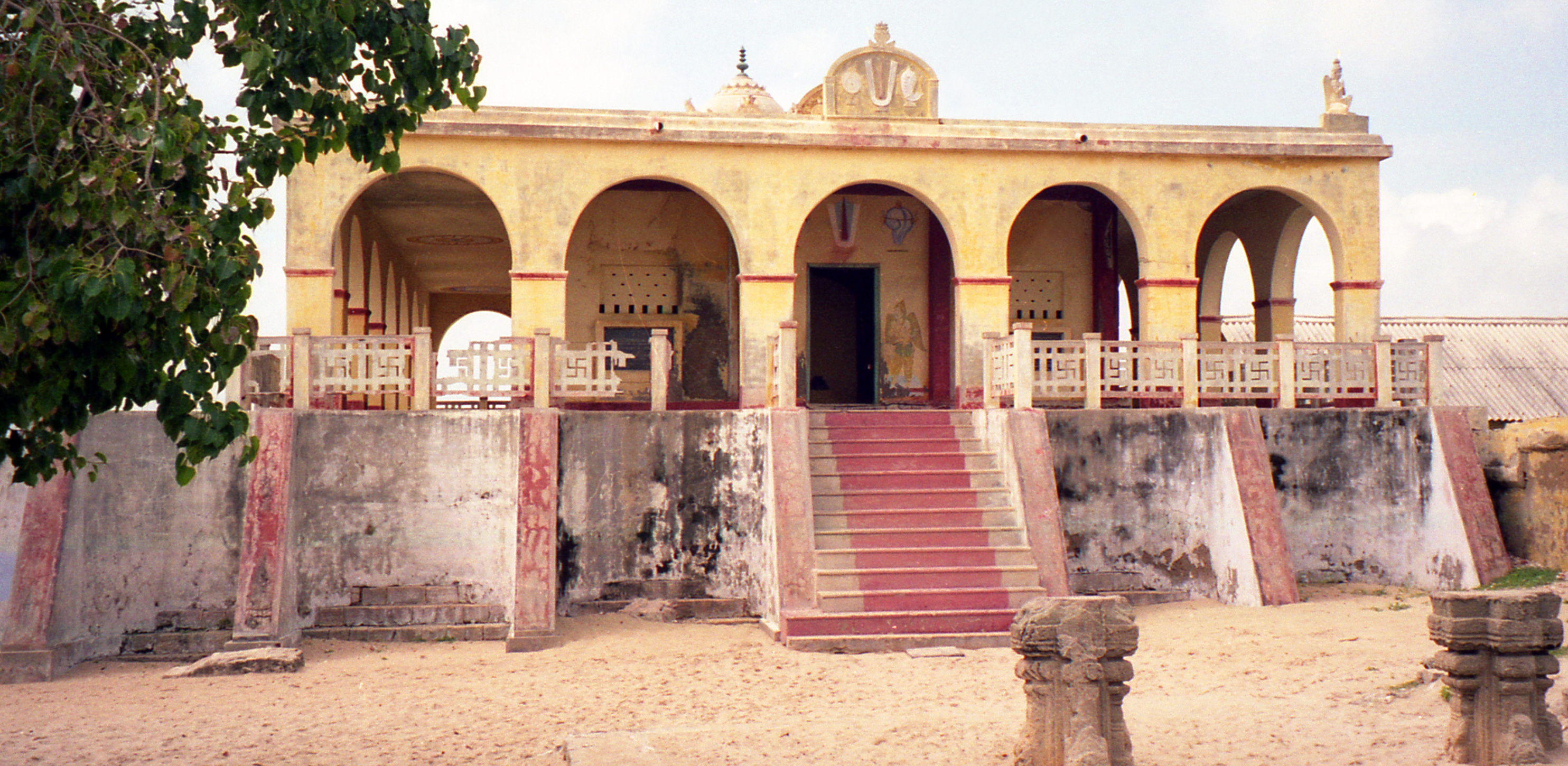
Front view of the Kothandaramaswamy Temple at Dhanushkodi

The Kothandaramaswamy Temple at Rameswaram, Tamil Nadu is a shrine dedicated to the Hindu deity Rama. The temple is Classified one among the 108 Abhimana Kshethram of Vaishnavate tradition. Located at a distance of 13 kilometres (8.1 mi) from Rameswaram, it forms the southernmost tip of the island. The temple is the only historical structure to survive the 1964 cyclone that washed away Dhanushkodi. The temple has the deities of Rama, Lakshmana, Sita, Hanuman and Vibhishana. The temple is surrounded by sea and remains a tourist attraction. It is easily accessible from Rameswaram.

== Historical background ==
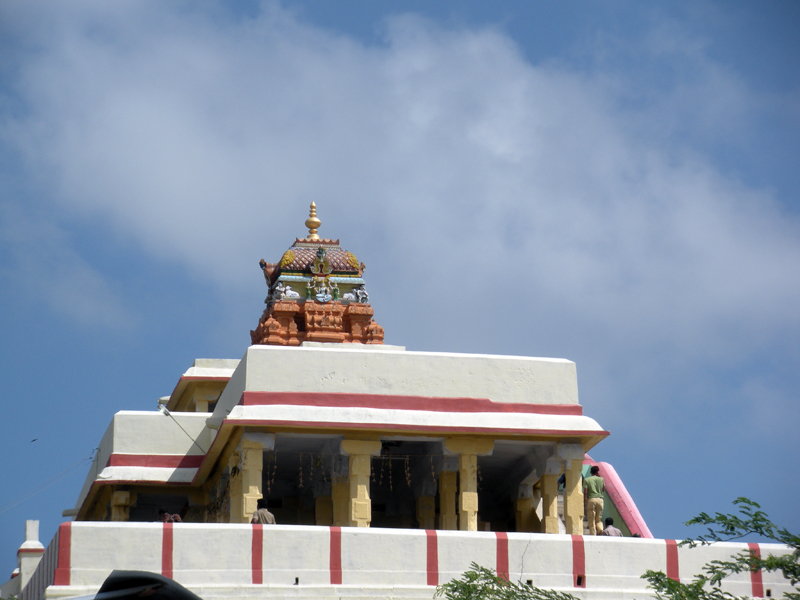
The gopuram (spire) of the temple

The temple is estimated to have been constructed about 500-1000 years ago. Rama, the main idol, is depicted as having a bow (Kothandam), and hence the name Kothandaramaswamy for the idol.

The temple is believed to be the place where Vibhishana, the younger brother of Ravana, asked Rama and his vanara (ape men) army for refuge. According to this tradition, after the abduction of Sita, Vibhishana advised Ravana to return her to Rama. However, Ravana did not listen to the advice, which led to Vibhishana fleeing from Lanka and joining Rama's army. When Vibhishana surrendered to Rama, the vanara army urged Rama not to accept Vibhishana believing him to be a spy. However, Rama accepted Vibhishana under the insistence of Hanuman stating that it is his duty to protect the ones surrendered to him. It is also said that after the slaying of Ravana, Rama performed the "Pattabhishekam" (ascension to king of Lanka) for Vibhishana at this place. The story is depicted in painting across the walls inside the shrine.

== Location and importance ==
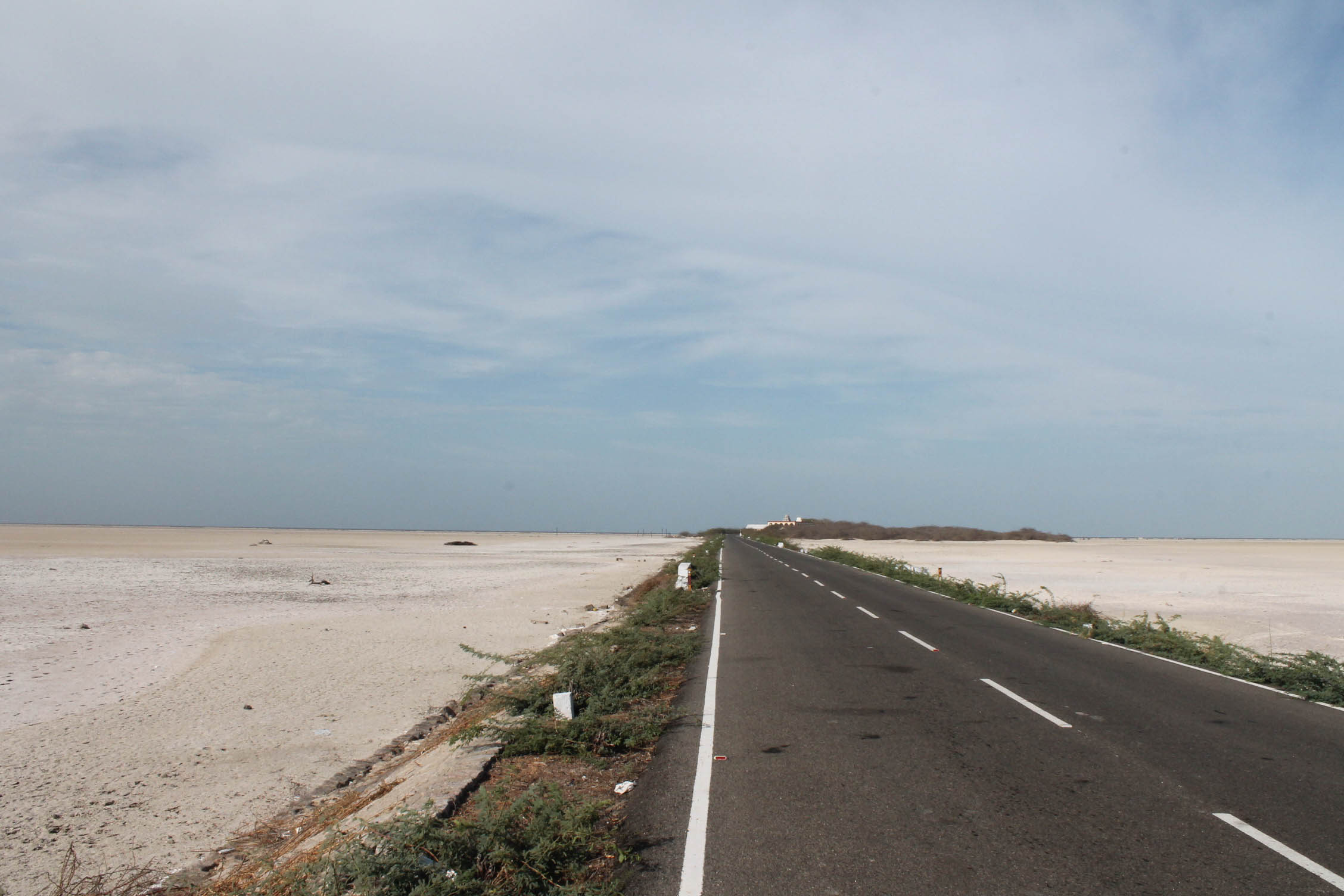
The road to the temple.

Situated on an island that is surrounded by Bay of Bengal and Gulf of Mannar, the temple is located 13 kilometres (8.1 mi) from Rameswaram. When Dhanushkodi was severely affected by the 1964 Rameswaram cyclone, the temple was the only structure that survived. Swami Vivekananda is said to have visited the place after his historic trip to Chicago.

== Sethusamudram project alignment ==
After Independence, six alignments were proposed for the implementation of the Sethusamudram Shipping Canal Project. Incidentally, the fourth of the six proposed alignments was dropped because it proposed that a large area around the Rameswaram island, including the temple, be demolished.
