= Anaipaar Island =

Island in Tamil Nadu, South India

Native name: Anaipar Tivu
- Interactive map of Anaipaar Island

Geography
- Coordinates: 09.1080°N 78.414164°E
- Area: 0.126523 km^{2} (0.048851 sq mi)

Administration
- India
- State: Tamil Nadu
- District: Ramanathapuram

Anaipar Tivu or Anaipaar Island is an island located in the Gulf of Mannar in the Ramanathapuram district of Tamil Nadu, southern India.

== Description ==
Anaipaar island is 70 km from Thoothukudi port and 13 km from the lower shore. It is an uninhabited island having an area of 0.126523 sq.km. It is a part of 21 islands of Gulf of Mannar Marine Biosphere. The island is part of the Gulf of Mannar Marine National Park, protected since 1980 under IUCN, Category II.

== See also ==
- Gulf of Mannar
