= Dhanushkodi Tirtham =

Hindu pilgrimage site in Tamil Nadu, India

Dhanushkodi Tirtham is one of the Tirthas in the island of Rameswaram, Tamil Nadu, India. This is located beside the ghost town of Dhanushkodi at the easternmost tip of Rameswaram Island. Rama used his bow's (Dhanush) end (Kodi) to break the bridge - Rama Setu (hence the name). This bridge was used for his army to cross over to Lanka for the victorious war against Ravana.

== Faith & Beliefs ==
The month of Maasi (Kumbha) (Feb-Mar) is the most auspicious bathing period. Other auspicious days include Arthodayam, Mahodayam, days of solar & lunar eclipses.

== References in Literature ==
References to this Tirtha is made in Sethu Puranam.
