= Vhan Island =

Island in the Bay of Bengal

Vhan Island / Vaan Island
- Interactive map of Vhan Island / Vaan Island

Geography
- Location: Bay of Bengal (The island is located about 9.5 km from the Thoothkudi Harbour)
- Coordinates: 08°50′18.93″N 78°12′35.65″E
- Area: 0.0676867 km^{2} (0.0261340 sq mi)
- Coastline: 0.91 km (0.565 mi)

Administration
- India

Demographics
- Population: Nil

Vhan Island, also called Van Tivu or Vaan Island, is a small, uninhabited island in the Bay of Bengal, situated about 8.5 kilometers from Thoothukudi (Tuticorin) Harbour in Tamil Nadu, India. It is situated approximately 5 kilometers from the Thoothukudi coast and is part of the Gulf of Mannar Marine Biosphere Reserve, India's first marine biosphere reserve.

== Erosion ==
Vhan Island underwent major restoration efforts to address erosion and damage to its reefs. From 1969 to 2015, Vaan Island's land area drastically shrank from 20.08 hectares to just 1.53 hectares, and its surrounding coral reefs were severely degraded, with much of the coral suffering from bleaching.

In 2015, the Tamil Nadu government, with support from the Union Ministry of Environment, launched a large coral restoration project. As part of this project, artificial reef modules were placed around the island, designed in collaboration with the Indian Institute of Technology Madras. These structures helped corals grow naturally, which increased the reef cover and helped stabilize the island's land.

These initiatives successfully reversed its decline, and by October 2020, the island's area expanded to 3.60 hectares during low tide and 1.99 hectares at high tide.

As reported in 2021, its land area had grown by 54% and marine biodiversity showed strong recovery.
