= Kollankodu =

- Town
- Location within Tamil Nadu Location within Kerala Location within India
- Coordinates: 8°18′00″N 77°07′21″E
- Country: India
- State: Tamil Nadu
- District: Kanniyakumari
- Established: March 4, 2022

Government
  - Type: Municipality
  - Municipality Commissioner: Thiru. P .Sankar
  - Municipality Chairman: Tmt.Rani. S

Population (2011)
  - Total: 63,042

Languages
  - Official: Tamil, English
  - Spoken: Tamil, Malayalam
- Time zone: UTC+5:30 (IST)
- PIN: 629160
- Vehicle registration: TN75

Kollankodu (also spelled Kollencode, Kollangode, Kollamkode) is a town in Kanyakumari district, Tamil Nadu, India. Kollencode is situated on the Tamil Nadu-Kerala border. It has 33 wards. It is a coastal village on the shores of the Laccadive Sea. Kollamcode is located 41 kilometres from Nagercoil and 36 kilometres from Thiruvananthapuram, the capital of Kerala, and also 64 kilometres from Kanyakumari.

Kollancode Municipality is under the administrative territory of the Kanyakumari district. The Kollancode town panchayat was constituted as Venkanji Village in 1953 and named Kollencode in 1977 as second grade special village panchayat. The Town is located at a distance of 10 km from Kaliyakkavilai to the north and 14 km from Kuzhithurai Municipality to the east. This town is located along the Kakkavilai to Kollencode State Highway Road. This Town Panchayat extends over an area of 12.64 km^2. The village has combined together to form Kollencode Town Panchayat. In 2004 it was cited as a special village panchayat. Again in 2006 it was upgraded as a first grade town panchayat. Today, Ezhudesam Town Panchayat along with Kollancode Town Panchayat forms the present-day Kollancode Municipality.

This village is famous for the Thookam Festival, celebrated by all without regard to caste and religion. It is celebrated once a year usually a date in March or April when the Bharani comes in Meenam month in Malayalam calendar). Kollamcode is also famous for its Bhadrakaliamman temple which draws large pilgrimages especially during the Thookam festival. It is believed that if childless couples visit the temple during the festival they will be blessed with a child.

== Municipality Officials ==
Chairperson Rani (DMK), Vice Chairperson Baby (Congress) were elected through the indirect election on March 4, 2022.

Kollankodu Municipality Officials
S. No	Designation	Name
1.	Commissioner	Thirumathi.S Durga
2.	Chairman	Tmt.Rani. S
3.	Vice-chairman	C. Baby
