= Dhanushkodi =

Former town in Tamil Nadu, India

- Former settlement
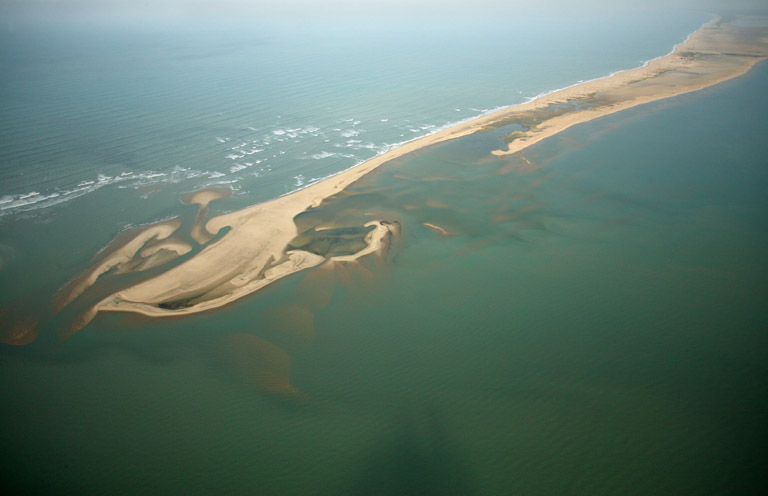
- Aerial view of the locality top end in its former state (now disturbed by an artificial extension of NH 87)
- Nickname: Ram Setu
- Location within Tamil Nadu Dhanushkodi (India)
- Coordinates: 9.152011°N 79.445851°E
- Country: India
- State: Tamil Nadu
- District: Ramanathapuram
- Destroyed: 1964
- Elevation: 0 m (0 ft)

Population (2001)
  - Total: 0
- Time zone: UTC+05:30 (IST)

Dhanushkodi (Tamil: [d̪ɐnuʃkoɖi]) is an abandoned town at the south-eastern tip of Pamban Island of the state of Tamil Nadu in India. It is south-east of Pamban and is about 24 kilometres (15 mi) west of Talaimannar in Sri Lanka. The town was destroyed during the 1964 Rameswaram cyclone and remains uninhabited in the aftermath. Although devoid of inhabitants, Dhanushkodi remains a tourist attraction due to its historical and mythological relevance.

== Geography ==
Dhanushkodi is on the tip of Pamban island near the Indian mainland, separated from Sri Lanka's Mannar Island by the Palk Strait.

== Transport ==
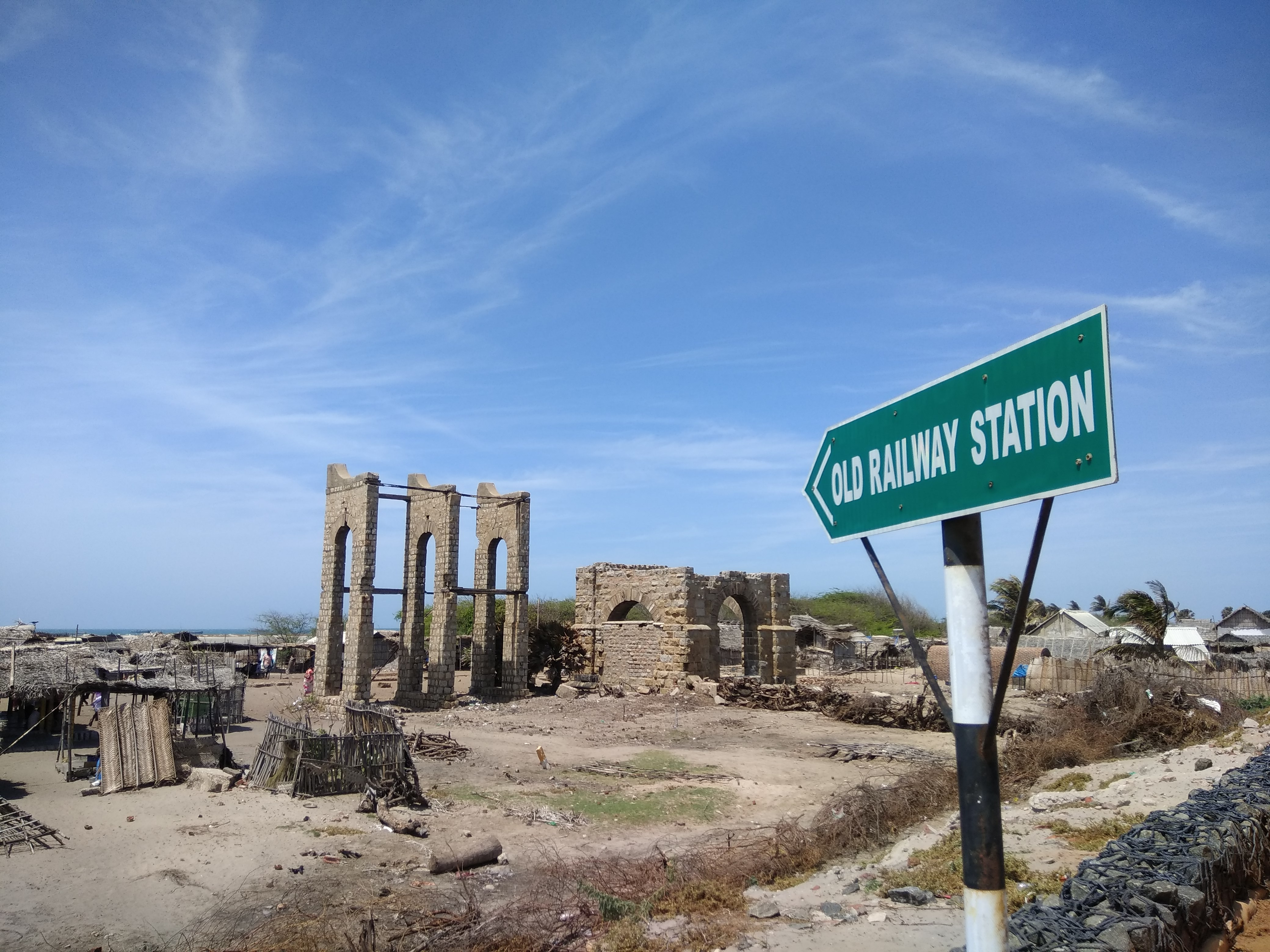
Remains of Dhanushkodi railway station.

The National Highway completed the 9.5 km long (5.9 mi) road from Mukuntharayar Chathiram to Dhanushkodi and 4.5 km (2.8 mi) from Dhanushkodi to Arichal Munai. Until 2016, Dhanushkodi was reachable either on foot along the seashore or in jeeps. In 2016, a road was completed from the village of Mukundarayar Chathiram.

A metre gauge railway line connected Mandapam on mainland India to Dhanushkodi. Boat mail express ran from Chennai Egmore to Dhanushkodi till 1964 when the metre-gauge branch line from Pamban to Dhanushkodi was destroyed during the 1964 Dhanushkodi cyclone. In 2003, Southern Railway sent a project report to Ministry of Railways for re-laying a 16-kilometre (9.9 mi) railway line to Dhanushkodi from Rameswaram. The planning commission looked into the possibility of a new railway line between Dhanushkodi and Rameswaram in 2010.

== 1964 cyclone ==
The area around Rameswaram is prone to high-intensity geomorphic activity. A scientific study conducted by the Geological Survey of India indicated that the southern part of Dhanushkodi facing the Gulf of Mannar sank by almost 5 metres (16 ft) in 1948 and 1949, due to vertical tectonic movement of land parallel to the coastline. As a result of this, a patch of land of about 0.5 kilometres (0.31 mi) in width, stretching 7 kilometres (4.3 mi) from north to south, was submerged under the sea.

On 17 December 1964, a tropical depression formed at 5°N 93°E in the South Andaman Sea. On 19 December, it intensified into a cyclonic storm. After 21 December 1964, it moved westwards, almost in a straight line, at the rate of 400 to 550 kilometres (250 to 340 mi) per day. On 22 December, it crossed Vavuniya in Sri Lanka and made landfall at Dhanushkodi on the night of 22–23 December 1964. Estimated wind velocity was 280 kilometres per hour (170 mph) and tidal waves were 7 metres (23 ft) high.

An estimated 1,800 people died in the cyclonic storm on 22 December including 115 passengers on board the Pamban-Dhanushkodi passenger train. The entire town was marooned and the Government of Madras declared Dhanushkodi as a ghost town, unfit for living.

Around the 40th anniversary of the deadly cyclone, the sea around Dhanushkodi receded about 500 metres (1,600 ft) from the coastline, briefly exposing the submerged part of the town before massive tsunami waves struck the coast on 26 December 2004.

== Gallery ==
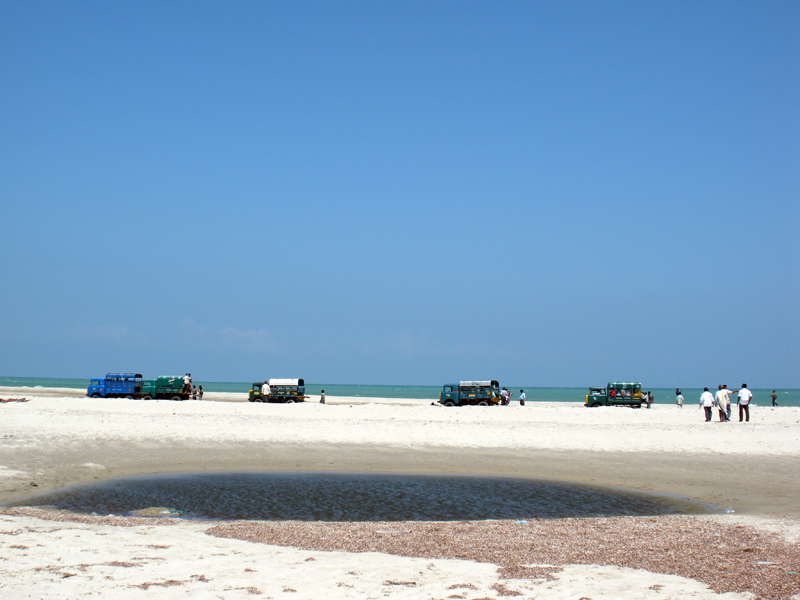
Mini Trucks take people to Land's End, Dhanushkodi, through deep sand and shallows, using planks put under wheels by local kids as the vehicle struggles.

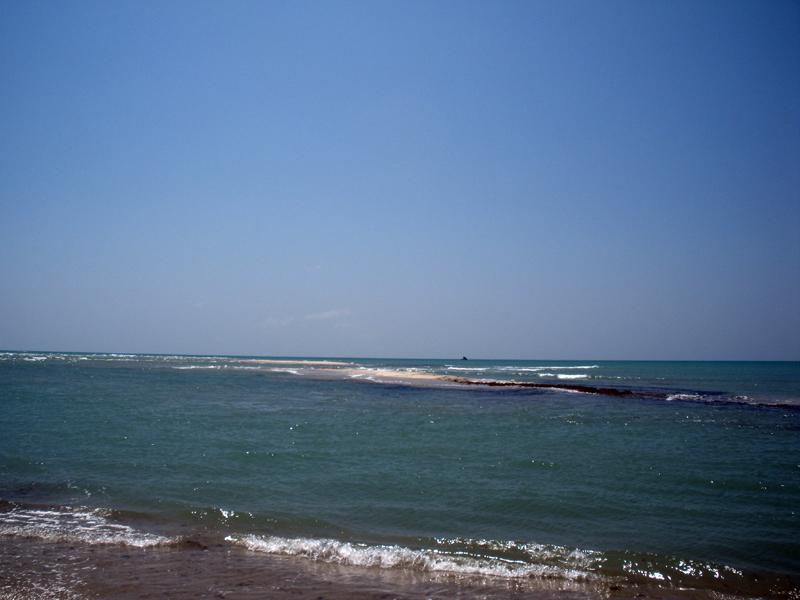
The sea from Land's End, Dhanushkodi. Sri Lanka is about 15 miles from here.

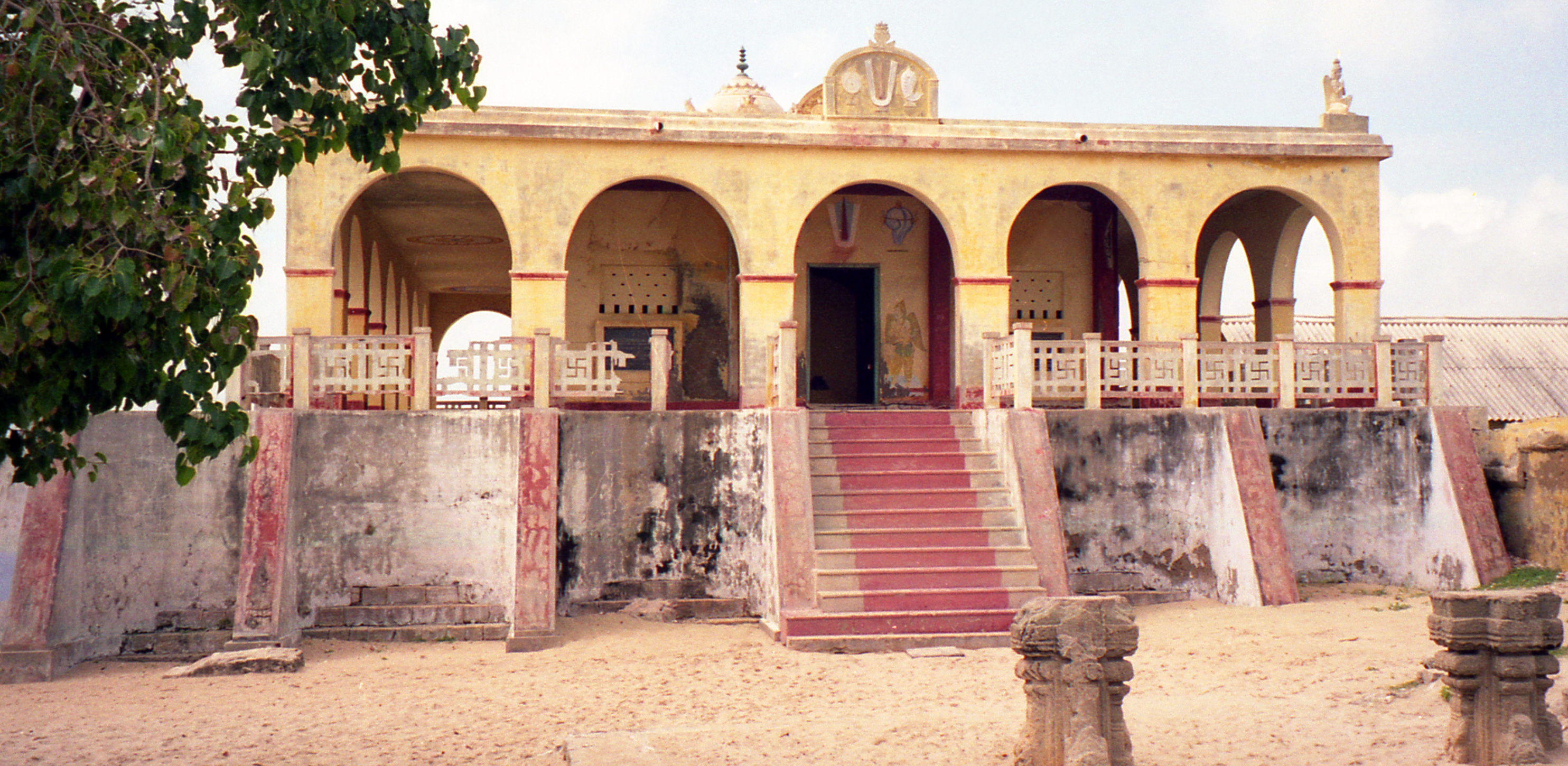
Front view of the Kothandaramaswamy Temple at Dhanushkodi

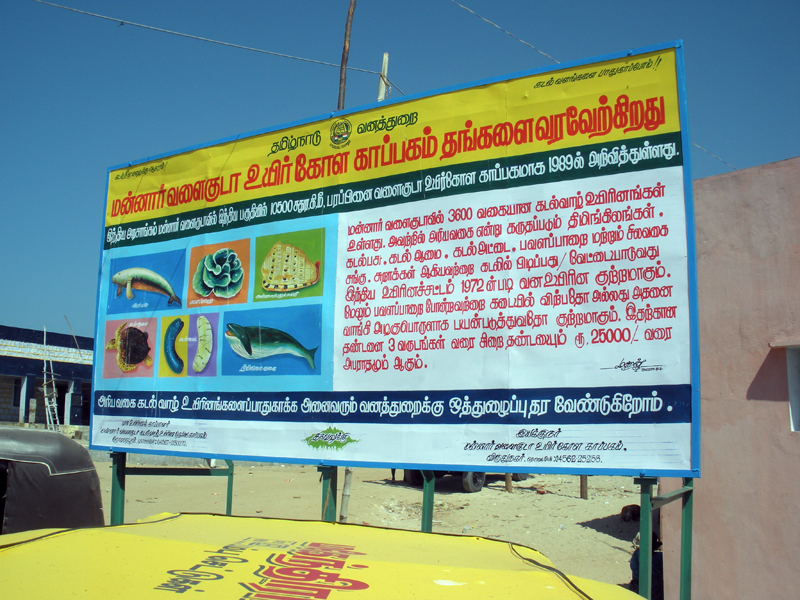
The Gulf of Mannar Marine Sanctuary is host to many marine animals and birds. Birds sighted here include flamingoes, curlew, gulls, terns, sandpipers, plovers, reef herons and egrets.

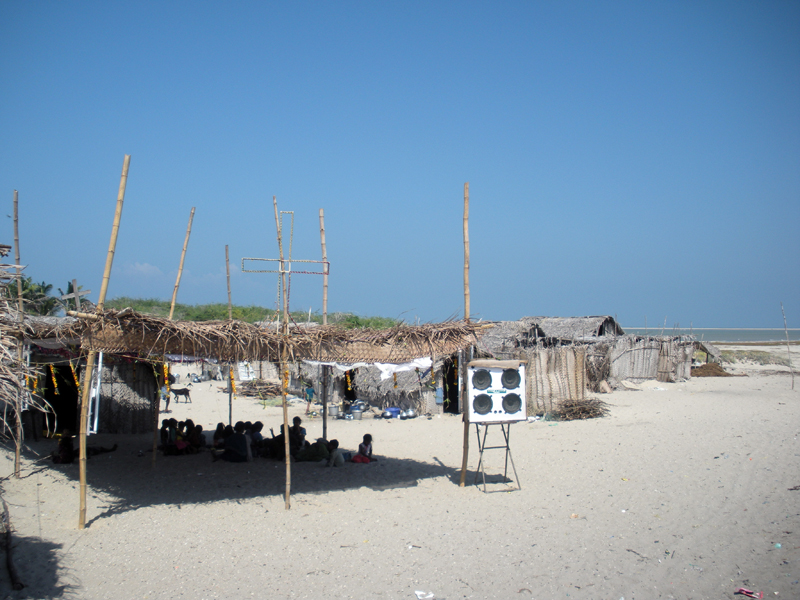
A church in Dhanushkodi.

== See also ==
- Dhanushkodi Tirtham
- Palk Strait bridge
- Kothandaramaswamy Temple
- Gulf of Mannar Marine National Park
- List of lost lands
- Dhanushkodi and Climate Change
