= Ezhudesam =

Neighbourhood in Kanyakumari district, Tamil Nadu, India

- Town
- Location in Tamil Nadu, India
- Coordinates: 8°16′55″N 77°09′04″E
- Country: India
- State: Tamil Nadu
- District: Kanniyakumari

Population (2011)
  - Total: 24,657

Languages
  - Official: Tamil, Malayalam
- Time zone: UTC+5:30 (IST)
- PIN: 629154, 629160, 629171, 629173, 629176
- Vehicle registration: TN-75

Ezhudesam is a town in Kanniyakumari district in the state of Tamil Nadu, India. Ezhudesam Town Panchayat along with Kollancode Town Panchayat forms the present-day Kollencode Municipality.

== Demographics ==
At the 2011 Census of India, Ezhudesam had a population of 24,657. Males constituted 52% of the population and females 48%. Ezhudesam had an average literacy rate of 90%, higher than the national average of 74%: male literacy was 92%, and female literacy was 87%. 11% of the population was under 6 years of age.

According to the previous census in 2001, Ezhudesam had a population of 18,652. Males constituted 50% of the population and females 50%. Ezhudesam had an average literacy rate of 80%, higher than the national average of 59.5%: male literacy was 83%, and female literacy was 77%. 10% of the population was under 6 years of age.
