= Gulf of Mannar Marine National Park =

Protected area of India

- IUCN category II (national park)
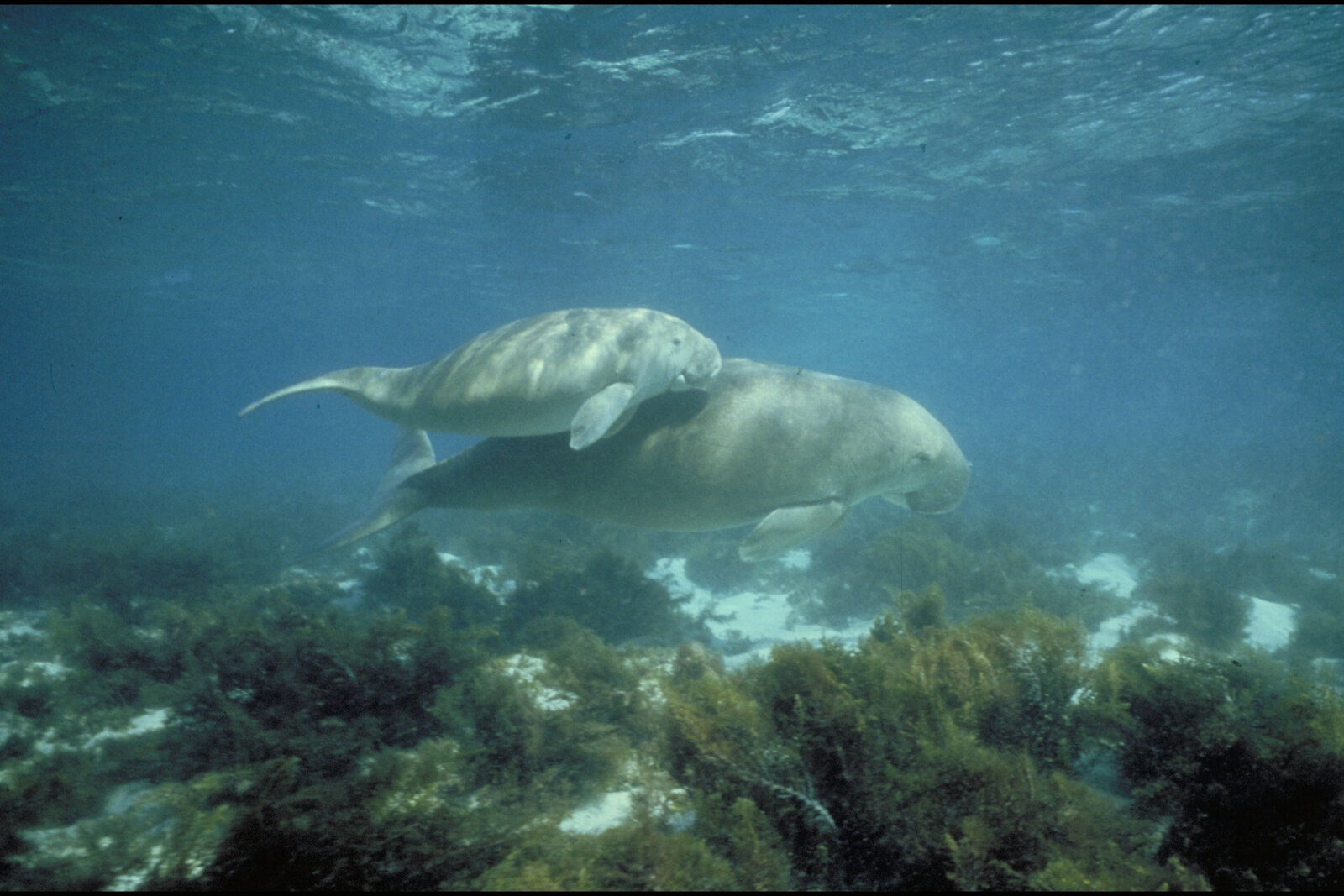
- Dugong, a vulnerable marine mammal

- Location within Tamil Nadu Location within India
- Interactive map of Gulf of Mannar Marine National Park
- Location: Coastal regions of Thoothukkudi and Ramanathapuram District, Tamil Nadu, India, and Adams Bridge.
- Nearest city: Rameswaram
- Coordinates: 09°08′15″N 79°28′21″E
- Area: 560 km^{2} (220 sq mi)
- Established: 1986
- Named for: Town of Mannar, Sri Lanka
- Governing body: Tamil Nadu Ministry of Environment and Forests
- Website: forests.tn.nic.in/WildBiodiversity/np_gmmnp.html

The Gulf of Mannar Marine National Park is a protected area of India consisting of 21 small islands (islets) and adjacent coral reefs in the Gulf of Mannar & Adams Bridge in the Indian Ocean. It lies 1 to 10 km away from the east coast of Tamil Nadu, India for 160 km between Thoothukudi (Tuticorin) and Dhanushkodi. It is the core area of the Gulf of Mannar Biosphere Reserve which includes a 10 km buffer zone around the park, including the populated coastal area. The park has a high diversity of plants and animals in its marine, intertidal and near shore habitats. Public access inside the park is limited to glass-bottom boat rides. It was established as a National Park in 1980. The Srilankan section of the Adams Bridge is the part of Adam's Bridge Marine National Park which is established in 2015.

== Geography ==
The 560 km^{2} (220 sq mi) park is part of the 140 km long and 25 km wide Mannar barrier reef. It lies between 8° 47' to 9° 15' N latitude and 78° 12' to 79° 14' E longitude. The 21 islands vary from 0.25 hectares (0.62 acres) to 130 ha. (321.2 acres). The total area of the islands is 6.23 km^{2} (2.41 sq mi).

The islands (listed southwest to northeast)

Tuticorin group: (4 islands)
Vaan (Vhan), 16.0 ha 8.83639°N 78.21047°E
Koswari, 19.50 ha 8.86879°N 78.22506°E
Vilanguchalli, 0.95 ha 8.93815°N 78.26969°E, now 1 m below mean low tide level as a result of excessive coral mining.
Kariyachalli, 16.46 ha 8.95409°N 78.25235°E

Vembar group: (3 islands)
Uppu Thanni, 22.94 ha, elevation 4 m 9.08921°N 78.49148°E
Puluvini Challi, 6.12 ha, elevation 5.5 m 9.10320°N 78.53688°E
Nalla Thanni, 101.00 ha, elevation 11.9 m (recently populated) 9.10667°N 78.57885°E

Kilakarai group: (7 islands)
Anaipar, 11.00 ha, elevation 2.1 m 9.15294°N 78.69481°E
Vali Munai, 6.72 ha, elevation 1.2 m 9.15354°N 78.73052°E
Poovarasan Patti, 0.50 ha, elevation 1.2 m 9.15413°N 78.76695°E
Appa, 28.63 ha, elevation 6.4 m 9.16582°N 78.82596°E
Talairi, 75.15 ha, elevation 2.7 m 9.18133°N 78.90673°E
Valai 10.10 ha, elevation 3.0 m 9.18421°N 78.93866°E
Mulli, 10.20 ha, elevation 1.2 m 9.18641°N 78.96810°E

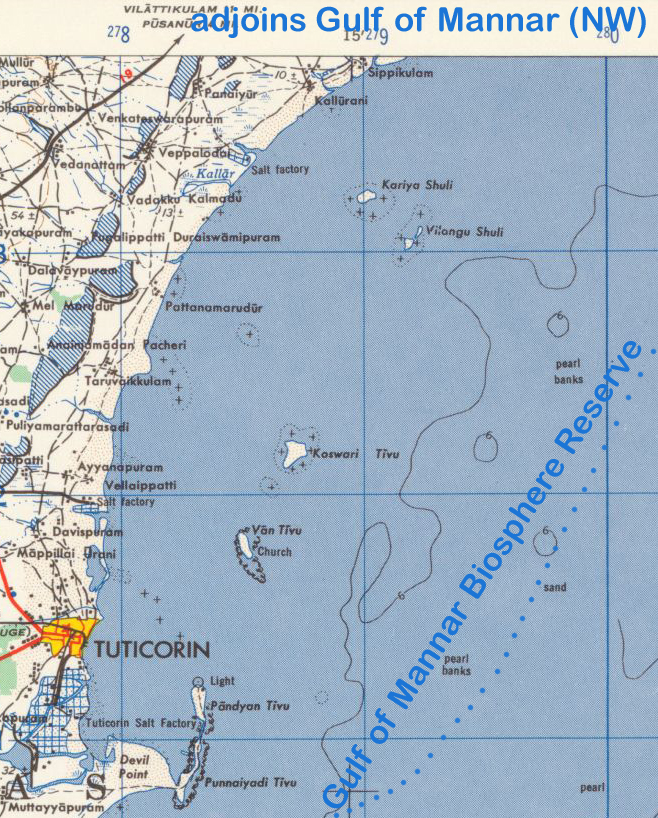
Topographic map (SW)

Mandapam group:(7 islands)
Musal, 124.00 ha, elevation 0.9 m 9.19912°N 79.07530°E (recently populated)
Manoli, 25.90 ha 9.21564°N 79.12834°E
Manoli-Putti 2.34 ha 9.21581°N 79.12800°E
Poomarichan 16.58 ha 9.24538°N 79.17993°E
Pullivasal, 29.95 ha 9.23699°N 79.19100°E
Kurusadai, 65.80 ha 9.24690°N 79.20945°E was recently populated. Its surrounding shallow waters harbour three species of seagrass that are found nowhere else in India. Representatives of every animal phylum known (except amphibians) are found on this island.
Shingle, 12.69 ha, elevation .6m 9.24174°N 79.23563°E

Tidal amplitude in the area is about .5m.

There were two more islands named Pandayan and Punnaiyadi at 8.78075°N 78.19536°E that were destroyed for construction of the new Tuticorn Port facilities.

== Flora ==
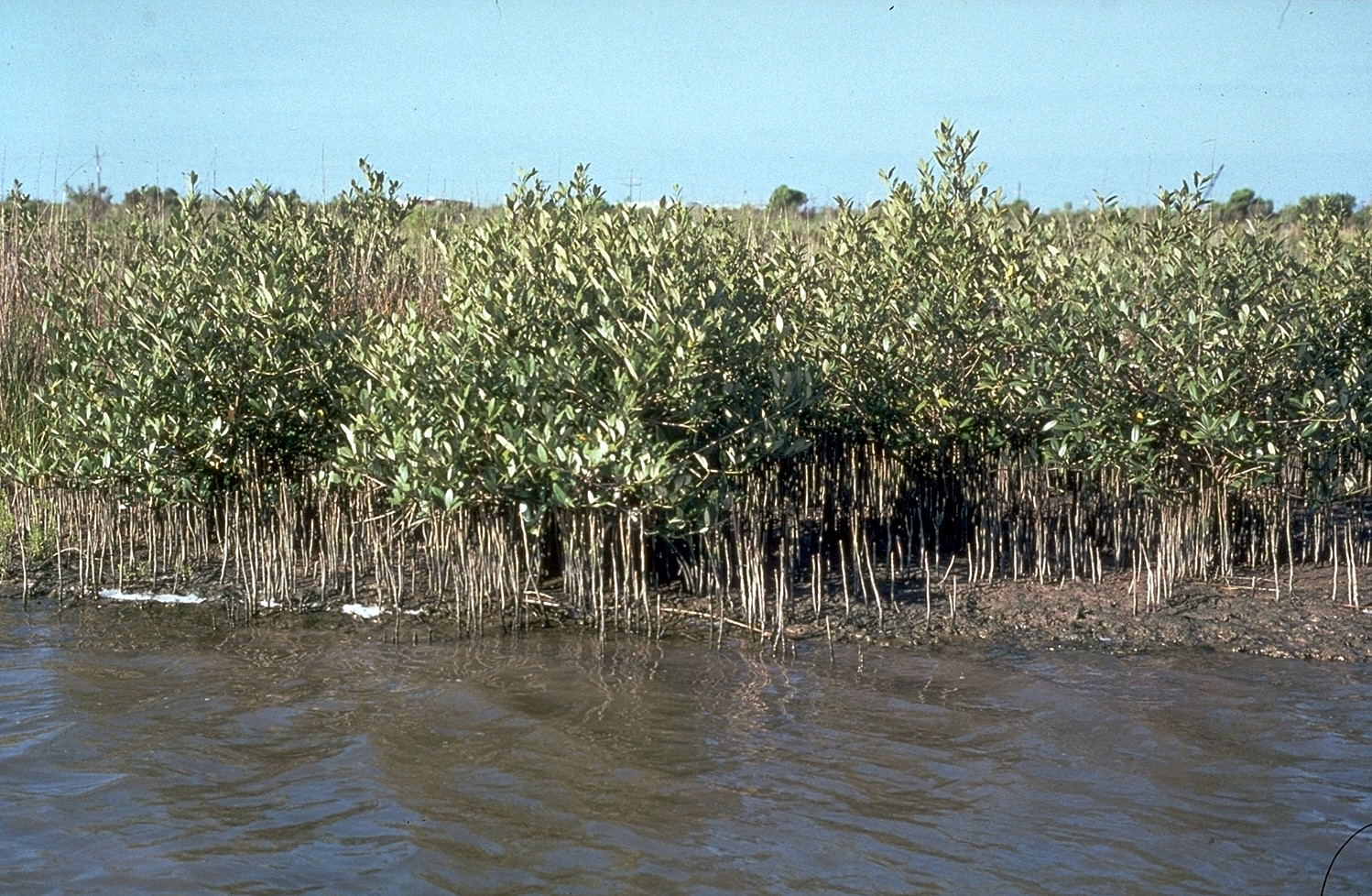
Mangroves

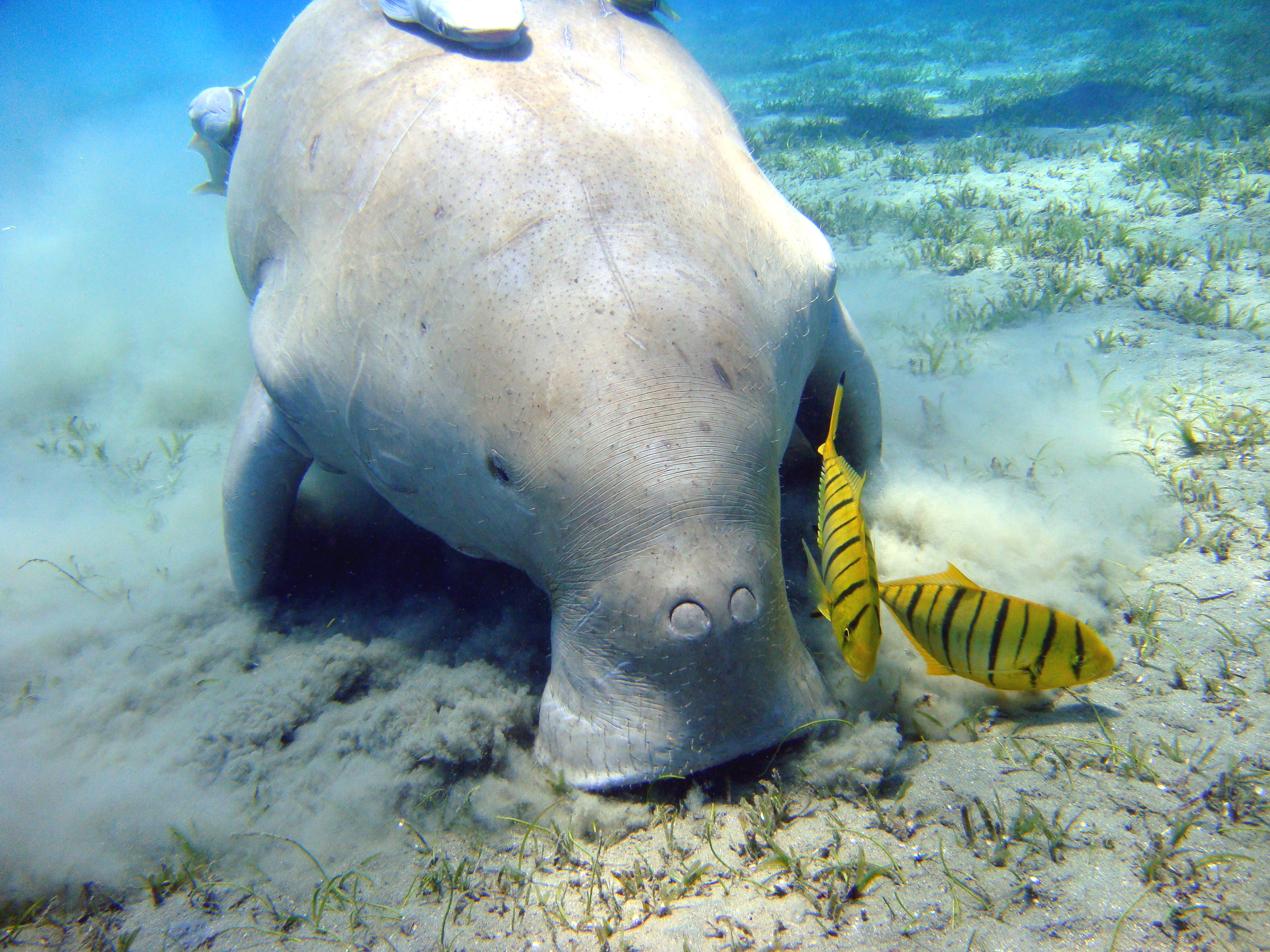
Dugong with tropical fish

The park includes marine components such as coral reefs, seaweed communities, sea grasses, and mangroves.

Mangroves dominate the intertidal zones of the park islands. They consist of species of the genera Rhizophora, Avicennia, Bruguiera, Ceriops and Lumnitzera. The introduced tree genus Prosopis is dominant on land in all the islands. The flowering herb Pemphis acidula (family Lythraceae) is the only endemic plant species. 12 species of sea grass and 147 species of seaweeds were recorded. This vegetation provides important feeding grounds for vulnerable marine mammals such as the dugong, endangered green turtles and olive ridley turtles.

== Fauna ==
Vertebrates

The dugong, a vulnerable marine mammal, is the flagship mammal of the park. It is an important habitat for the cetaceans: Indo-Pacific bottlenose dolphin, finless porpoise, spinner dolphin, common dolphin, Risso's dolphin, melon-headed whale, and dwarf sperm whale. Larger whales include sperm whale, minke whale, Bryde's whale, sei whale, and critically endangered species including humpback whale, fin whale, and blue whale.

About 510 (23%) of the 2,200 fin fish species in Indian waters are found in the Gulf, making it the most highly diverse fish habitat in India. Coral associated ornamental fishes of the family Chaetodontidae (butterfly fish), parrotfish, Amphiprion spp. (clown fish), Holocentrus spp. (squirrel fish), Scarus spp. (parrot fish), Lutjanus spp. (snappers) and Abudefduf saxatilis (sergeant major) are abundant.

A unique endemic species of Balanoglossus – Ptychodera fluva, a living fossil that links invertebrates and vertebrates, has been recorded only at Kurusadai.

Invertebrates

Four species each of shrimp and lobster, 106 species of crab, 17 species of sea cucumber, and 466 species of mollusc including 271 gastropods, 174 bivalves, 5 polyplacophorans, 16 cephalopods and 5 scaphopods, 108 species of sponge, and 100 species of echinoderm occur in the Gulf.

The coral fauna includes 106 species from 30 genus of hermatypes and 11 species from 10 genus of ahermatypes, including 13 new species, giving a total of 117 species from 14 families and 40 genus. The reefs in this area are narrow fringing reefs located 150 to 300 m. from the shore of the islands and patch reefs rising up from depths of 2 to 9 m. and extending up to 2 km. long and 50 m. wide. Large areas of these reefs are in generally poor condition due to destructive human activities of the 150,000 persons living along the coast. Nutrient and other pollution loads are high due to agriculture, deforestation, industry, urbanization and septic pollution. It appears that the coral reefs of the Gulf of Mannar Marine National Park seem to be healthy and in good condition, despite high rates of sedimentation and other threats. However, live coral cover is only about 35%. Various algae cover much of the dead coral.

Stony coral species of families Poritidae and Faviidae constitute the dominant reef builders here. Coral reefs near some of the islands have been heavily damaged by exploitation as raw materials for industrial ventures such as cement industries, brick manufacture, masonry work and lime kilns. Though legal quarrying of the reefs is now stopped, up to 250 m^{3}/day of reef were destroyed for many years.

== Habitation ==
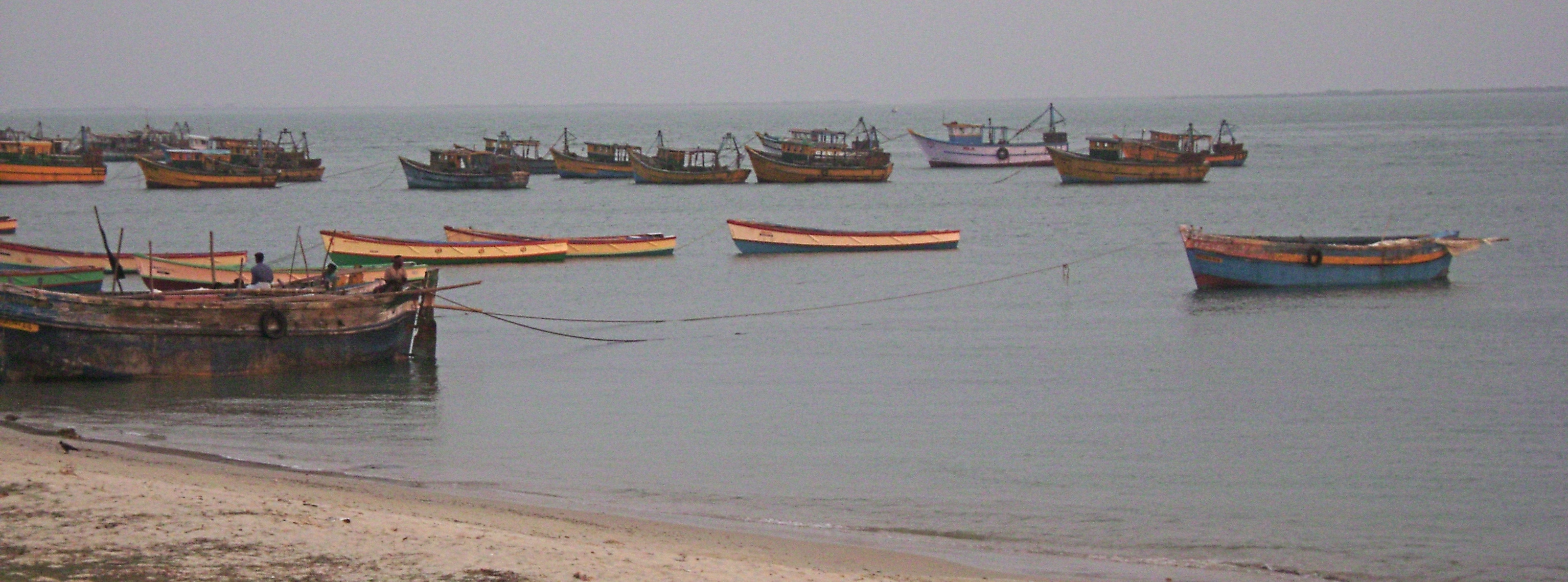
Boats at Mandapam that fish in GOMMNP

The islands are uninhabited except for Krusadai, Musal and Nallathanni islands where antipoaching sheds are operating. Along the coast near the park there are about 125 villages which support about 100,000 people who are mainly Marakeyars, a local community principally engaged in fishing.

== Habitat degradation ==
Experts say that Vaan Island, one of the four islands of the Tuticorn group, has split in two and if immediate efforts are not taken then the island would soon vanish under the sea. Vaan Island, which is the southernmost of the 21 islands in the Gulf of Mannar, was initially spread across 16 hectares, but had shrunk alarmingly by around 10.3 hectares to its current 5.7 hectares in less than three decades. According to J K Patterson Edward, director of Suganthi Devadasan Marine Research Institute, Tuticorin, "Rampant coral mining by people of the fishing villages along the coast is the main cause of the devastation to the island. Coral mining was banned in 2005, but the damage had already been done." Two of the 21 islands have already submerged around a decade ago.

== See also ==
- Indian Council of Forestry Research and Education
- Coral reefs in India
- Central Marine Fisheries Research Institute
- Fisheries College and Research Institute
