= Gulf of Mannar =

Gulf of the Indian Ocean between India and Sri Lanka

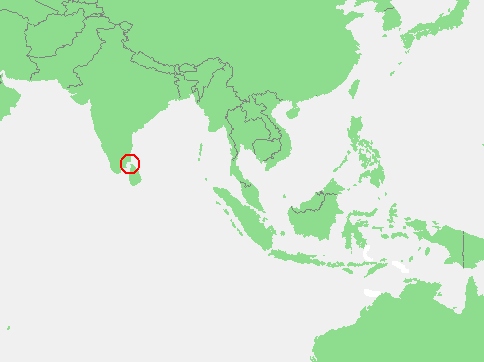
- Location of Gulf of Mannar within the Indian Ocean

- Location of Gulf of Mannar between India and Sri Lanka
- Location: Indian Ocean
- Coordinates: 8.47°N 79.02°E
- Basin countries: India, Sri Lanka
- Max. length: 160 km (99 mi)
- Max. width: 130–275 km (81–171 mi)
- Surface area: 10,500 km^{2} (4,100 sq mi)
- Average depth: 5.8 m (19 ft)
- Max. depth: 1,335 m (4,380 ft)

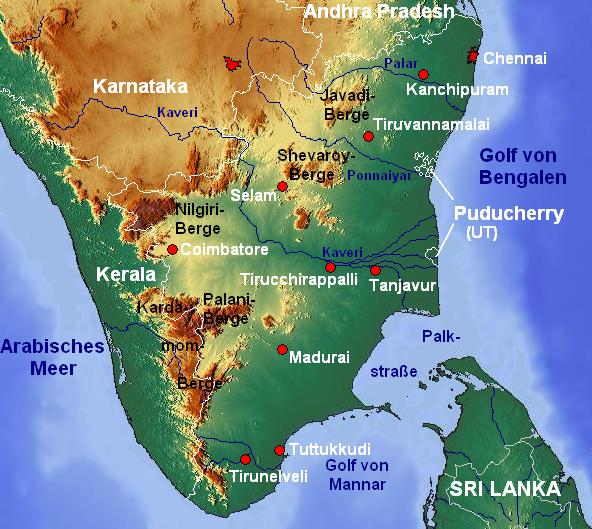
Topographic map of Gulf of Mannar

The Gulf of Mannar (/məˈnɑːr/ mə-NAR, Tamil: மன்னார் வளைகுடா, romanized: Maṉṉār vaḷaikuṭā, IPA: [mɐnːaːɾ]; Sinhala: මන්නාරම් බොක්ක, romanized: mannāram bokka) is a large shallow bay forming part of the Laccadive Sea in the Indian Ocean with an average depth of 5.8 m (19 ft). It lies between the southeastern tip of India and the west coast of Sri Lanka, in the Coromandel Coast region. The chain of low islands and reefs known as Adam’s Bridge or Rama Setu (Rama’s Bridge), which includes Mannar Island, separates the Gulf of Mannar from Palk Bay, which lies to the north between India and Sri Lanka. The estuaries of Thamirabarani River and Vaippar River of South India and the Malvathu Oya (Malvathu River) of Sri Lanka drain into the Gulf. The dugong (sea cow) is found here.

== Conservation ==
=== Marine sanctuary ===
Located on the southeastern tip of the subcontinent, the Gulf of Mannar is known to harbour over 3,600 species of flora and fauna, making it one of the richest coastal regions in Asia. Around 117 hard coral species have been recorded in the Gulf of Mannar. Sea turtles are frequent visitors to the gulf as are sharks, dugongs, and dolphins. However, the combined effects of 47 villages, with a total population of around 50,000 has meant that overharvesting of marine species has become a problem. The decline of fish populations has been accompanied with reducing numbers of pearl oyster, gorgonian coral, and acorn worm. Local fishermen rely on the reef to feed their families, but destructive fishing methods combined with the stress of pollution and coral mining have meant both nearshore and offshore catches have decreased. Endangered species include dolphins, dugongs, whales, and sea cucumbers.

In 1986, a group of 21 islets including Anaipaar Island lying off the Tamil Nadu coast between Thoothukudi and Dhanushkodi was declared the Gulf of Mannar Marine National Park. The park and its 10 km (6.2 mi) buffer zone were declared a Biosphere Reserve in 1989.

=== Biosphere reserve ===
The Gulf of Mannar Biosphere Reserve covers an area of 10,500 km^{2} (4,100 sq mi) of ocean, 21 islands and the adjoining coastline. The islets and coastal buffer zone include beaches, estuaries, and tropical dry broadleaf forests, while the marine environments include seaweed communities, sea grass communities, coral reefs, salt marshes and mangrove forests. The Gulf of Mannar Biosphere Reserve was included in UNESCO's World Network of Biosphere Reserves in 2001. In May 2019, The National Centre for Coastal Research, an institute under the Ministry of Earth Sciences of India, which has a field research station in the Gulf of Mannar region, found an alarming pattern of bleaching in the reefs in Mandapam, Kilakarai and Palk Bay. Researchers observed a pattern of bleaching in corals when the temperatures rose to between 32 °C and 36 °C (90–97 °F).

== Marine activities ==
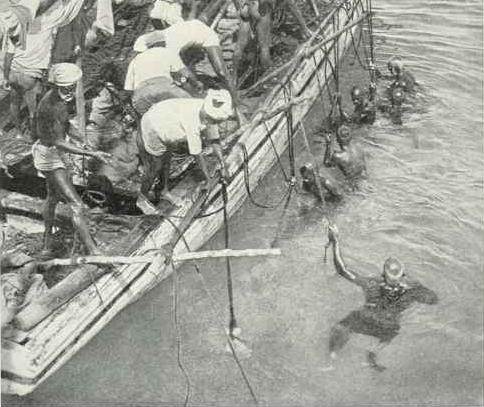
Pearl fishing in the Gulf of Mannar, c. 1926

The Gulf of Mannar is known for its pearl banks of Pinctada radiata and Pinctada fucata for at least 2,000 years. Pliny the Elder (23–79 CE) praised the pearl fishery of the gulf as one of the most productive in the world. Although extraction of natural pearls is considered too expensive in most parts of the world, it is still carried out in the gulf.

The chief seaports on the Gulf of Mannar are Thoothukudi (Tuticorin) in Tamil Nadu, and Colombo in Sri Lanka. While these ports can accommodate deep-draft vessels, the shallow Palk Strait can only accommodate small shallow-draft vessels. In July 2005, the Indian Government took preliminary steps to go ahead with the Sethusamudram Shipping Canal Project, which would create a deep channel linking the Gulf of Mannar to the Bay of Bengal. Project boosters emphasize the benefits of a direct shipping route that connects India's east and west coasts without the long trip around Sri Lanka; environmentalists have warned against the grave damage such a project could cause to the sea life and fisheries of the Palk Strait and the Gulf.

== See also ==
- Coral reefs in India
