= List of Archaeological Protected Monuments in Hambantota District =

This is a list of Archaeological Protected Monuments in Hambantota District, Sri Lanka.

Monument	Image	Location	Grama Niladhari Division	Divisional Secretary's Division	Registered	Description	Refs
Official quarters of the Government Agent (fmr)		Hambantota town west No. 09	Hambantota	Hambantota	25 March 2016	At towerhill road	
Building within the premises of District Secretariat		Hambantota town west No. 09	Hambantota	Hambantota	25 March 2016	At towerhill road	
Court complex's main building and three other buildings		Hambantota town west No. 09	Hambantota	Hambantota	25 March 2016	At towerhill road	
Hambantota gallows		Hambantota town west No. 09	Hambantota	Hambantota	25 March 2016	Gallows at the premises adjoining the land in front of the premises of the Department of Meteorology Squire at towerhill road	
Prison wall		Hambantota	Hambantota	Hambantota	25 March 2016	Wall belonging to the prison at Beach road	
Athubodaya Purana Vihara			Buddiyagama East	Weeraketiya	30 December 2011	Image house	
Attanayala Sri Vihara			Attanayala-East	Angunakolapelessa	6 June 2008	Buddhist shrine, Dhamma discourse hall and dagoba	
Awasakanda Archaeological ruins		Kachcheriyagama		Thissamaharama	1 November 1996	Ruins of Buildings	
Badagiriya Raja Maha Vihara		Badagiriya		Hambantota	7 January 1944	Stupa	
Beragama Punyawardhanarama Vihara			No. 119, Udaberagama	Hambantota	30 December 2011	Arama Complex	
Beragama Vilgam Vehera			No. 119, Udaberagama	Hambantota	30 December 2011	Arama Complex	
Debarawewa Menik Raja Maha Vihara		Debarawewa		Thissamaharama	1 November 1996	Stupa and other ruins	
Debarawewa Pashchimarama Vihara		Debarawewa		Thissamaharama	1 November 1996	Stupa and other ruins	
Galkote Raja Maha Vihara		Nihiluwa		Beliatta	1 November 1996	Image house	
Galwewa Raja Maha Vihara			No. 118, Galwewa	Hambantota	22 July 2011	The old Arama (dwelling) complex	
Godavaya Vihara		Paibekka		Hambantota	7 January 1944		
Hakuruwela Raja Maha Vihara			Hakuruwela	Angunakolapelessa	6 June 2008	Bhikku rest house, Dhamma discourse hall and restricted Bhikku activity centre	
Hambantota Lighthouse		Hambantota town west No. 09	Hambantota	Hambantota	25 March 2016		
Hellala Dakshina Purana Vihara			Sapugahayaya	Katuwana	6 June 2008	Dagoba and pathway wall around the shrine	
Henry Jones tombstone		Hambantota town west No. 09	Hambantota	Hambantota	25 March 2016	Tombstone of Magistrate Henry Jones John Squire at towerhill road	
Ihala Wadiyagama Stupa		Ihala Wadiyagama	Dambethalawa	Katuwana	23 January 2009	Dagoba mound	
Kadiragoda Nuga tree		Kadiragoda		Tangalle	11 March 1966		
Kahadagala Sri Dhammadhinna Vihara			Ranna	Tangalle	6 June 2008	Dagoba and three rock stone inscriptions	
Kahadawa Purana Vihara			Ranna	Tangalle	6 June 2008	Buddhist shrine	
Karabagala Aranya Senasana				Sooriyawewa		Vihara believed to be the Bilivana Vihara identified in the inscription of King Sri Meghavanna (303-331AD).	
Karuwalagala Purana Vihara			No. 120, Bellagaswewa	Hambantota	22 July 2011	Drip-ledged cave complex and stupa godella	
Kasagala Raja Maha Vihara			Udayala	Angunakolapelessa	6 June 2008	Bhikku residence, Dhamma discourse hall, Buddhist shrine, Dagoba, two inscriptions and pathway wall around the shrine	
Kasagala Vihara		Kahagal Viharagoda		Weeraketiya	3 June 1953		
Katuwana fort		Katuwana		Katuwana			
Katuwana Sri Vihara			Katuwana	Katuwana	6 June 2008	Buddhist shrine	
Kesel Watta Vihara		Udagomadiya	Keselwatta	Katuwana	6 June 2008	Ruins with stone pillars	
Kirinda Maha Vihara				Thissamaharama			
Kolaberiya Elagawa Watta Archaeological ruins			Kinchigune South	Weeraketiya	6 June 2008	Building ruins with the stone pillars in the land	
Konthagala Raja Maha Vihara				Weeraketiya	6 June 2008	Bhikku rest house building, Dhamma discourse hall and Dagoba	
Kottamba Sri Subadhrarama Vihara			Heenatigahamula	Okewela	23 January 2009	Image house	
Makuladeniya Purana Raja Maha Vihara			Makuladeniya	Angunakolapelessa	6 June 2008	Buddhist shrine	
Martello tower		Hambantota town west No. 09	Hambantota	Hambantota	25 March 2016	At towerhill road	
Middeniya Purana Vihara			Murungasyaya-West	Katuwana	6 June 2008	Buddhist shrine, Bhikku Rest and alms giving hal	
Mulkirigala Raja Maha Vihara		Mulkirigala		Weeraketiya	8 April 1988	Cave temple with paintings	
Naigala Raja Maha Vihara		Agrahera		Weeraketiya	22 April 1966		
Nakadawala Vihara			Pangamvilyaya	Katuwana	6 June 2008	Buddhist shrine	
Nalagama Ganegoda Purana Vihara		Nalagama	Vagegoda	Tangalle	6 June 2008	Buddhist shrine	
Nandimitra Stupa		Katagamuwa		Thissamaharama	5 May 1967	Stupa	
Nedigamwila Archaeological ruins		Nedigamwila		Thissamaharama	1 March 1974	Ruins of stupa	
Panchathuparama Purana Vihara		Puvakdandawa	Puvakdandawa West	Beliatta	6 June 2008	Buddhist shrine	
Pillawela Vihara			Gajanayakagama	Angunakolapelessa	6 June 2008	Tampita vihara, rest house of Bhikkus, the ruins with Bodhi tree and dhamma discourse hall	
Punchi Akurugoda archaeological ruins		Sandagirigama		Thissamaharama	7 December 2001	Ruins	
Raluwa Tanketiya Watta Archaeological ruins			No. 536 - Raluwa	Weeraketiya	6 June 2008	Building ruins with stone pillars	
Ramba Raja Maha Vihara		Pallerota		Ambalantota	7 January 1944	Stupa	
Rankothmaluwa Vihara		Vagegoda	Vagegoda	Tangalle	6 June 2008	Buddhist shrine	
Rekawa Jaya Maha Vihara		Rekawa	Rekawa West	Tangalle	6 June 2008	Buddhist shrine, Bhikku rest house and dagoba	
Sandagiri Seya			Ranakeliya North	Thissamaharama	18 November 1949	Image house	
Seehala Purana Vihara			Buddiyagama East	Weeraketiya	6 June 2008	Tampita vihara	
Sithulpawwa Rajamaha Viharaya				Thissamaharama			
Sittam Gallena Raja Maha Vihara			Warapitiya	Walasmulla	6 June 2008	Pahala Len Vihara, Ihala Len Vihara and dagoba	
Sooriyapokuna Raja Maha Vihara			Sooriyapokuna	Angunakolapelessa	6 June 2008	Building ruins with stone pillars	
Sri Bodhimalu Purana Raja Maha Vihara		Medamulana		Weeraketiya	1 November 1996	Image house	
Sri Sudarshanarama Vihara, Henakaduwa		Marakolliya, Henakaduwa		Tangalle	6 June 2008	Buddhist shrine, Bhikku rest house and dagoba	
Sri Sunandarama vihara, Beliatta			Beliatta	Beliatta	6 June 2008	Dhamma discourse hall within the precincts	
Talawa Sri Bodhialakarama Vihara		Talawa	Talawa-North	Angunakolapelessa	6 June 2008	Buddhist shrine, Bhikku rest house and alms giving hall	
Tangalle Court complex		Tangalle town	273 Pallikudawa	Tangalle	29 June 2012		
Thihava Archaeological ruins		Thihava		Thissamaharama	17 November 1967	Stupa ruins	
Tissamaharama Raja Maha Vihara				Thissamaharama			
Tissamaharama Old Market		Tissamaharama town		Thissamaharama	1 November 1996	Building ruins	
Uchchawalitha Raja Maha Vihara		Mahabolana	No. 140, Bolana South	Ambalantota	30 December 2011	The old stupa, image house, ruins of buildings and Stupa godeli	
Udarota-Pallerota archaeological ruins				Ambalantota	7 December 2001	Ruins	
Uddakandara Puarana Vihara		Ranakeliya		Thissamaharama	1 November 1996	Caves, inscriptions and ruins of buildings	
Veheragala Archaeological Site			49 Veheragala	Lunugamvehera	22 July 2011	Rock Stone with archaeological remains, including stone pillars, sacred-foot stone, rock inscription, base stone, Buddha statue made of stone, stupa, mound, flight of steps, ruin hillocks and amulet-stone	
Veheragoda Stupa		Kudabolana Malayu's Colony	No. 141, Kudabolana	Ambalantota	23 January 2009		
Vehera Kotha Kanda Vihara			No. 508 - Welipitiya West	Katuwana	6 June 2008	Dagoba	
Vilgam Raja Maha Vihara		Baragama		Ambalantota			
Wathukanda Purana Vihara			Wattukanda	Katuwana	6 June 2008	Buddhist shrine, Bhikku rest house and dagoba	
Weharakotuwa archaeological ruins			Warapitiya	Walasmulla	6 June 2008	Dagoba and paved pathway wall around sanctum santorum in the land called "Weharakotuwa" owned by Mr. Warapitiya Samarasinghe	
Yatala Vehera				Thissamaharama			
Yodakandiya Naga Maha Vihara		Yodakandiya		Thissamaharama	1 November 1996	Pond and ruins	
