= Naigala Raja Maha Vihara =

Buddhist temple in Weeraketiya, Sri Lanka

Naigala Raja Maha Viharaya
- නයිගල රජ මහා විහාරය
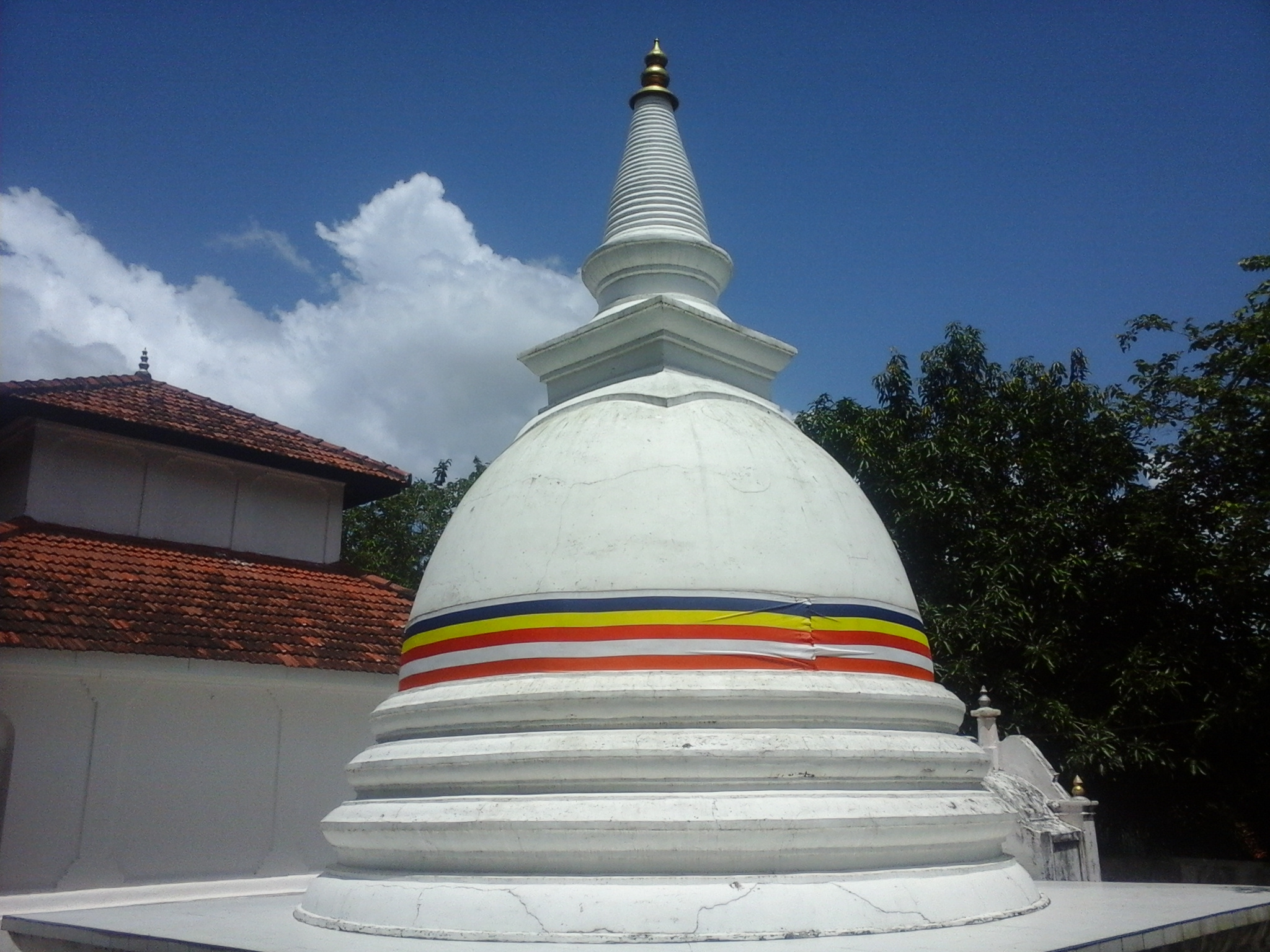

Religion
- Affiliation: Buddhism
- District: Hambantota
- Province: Southern Province

Location
- Location: Weeraketiya, Sri Lanka
- Country: Sri Lanka
- Interactive map of Naigala Raja Maha Viharaya
- Coordinates: 6.148406°N 80.784767°E

Architecture
- Type: Buddhist Temple
- Founder: King Gotabhaya and Mahananga

Naigala Rajamaha Viharaya (Sinhala: නයිගල රජ මහා විහාරය) is an ancient Buddhist temple situated in Weeraketiya, Hambantota District, Sri Lanka. It is located about 2 km (1.2 mi) away from Weeraketiya junction and 8 km (5.0 mi) from ancient Buddhist temple, Mulkirigala Raja Maha Vihara.

This temple has been built according to the Pabbata Vihara system and it is considered that the Naigala Raja Maha Viharaya was one of the rare sites in Ruhuna Kingdom with Panchayathana features and seven Stupas. Due to its historical importance, this temple has been formally recognised by the Government as an archaeological site in Sri Lanka. The designation was declared on 22 April 1966 under the government Gazette number 14692.

== History ==
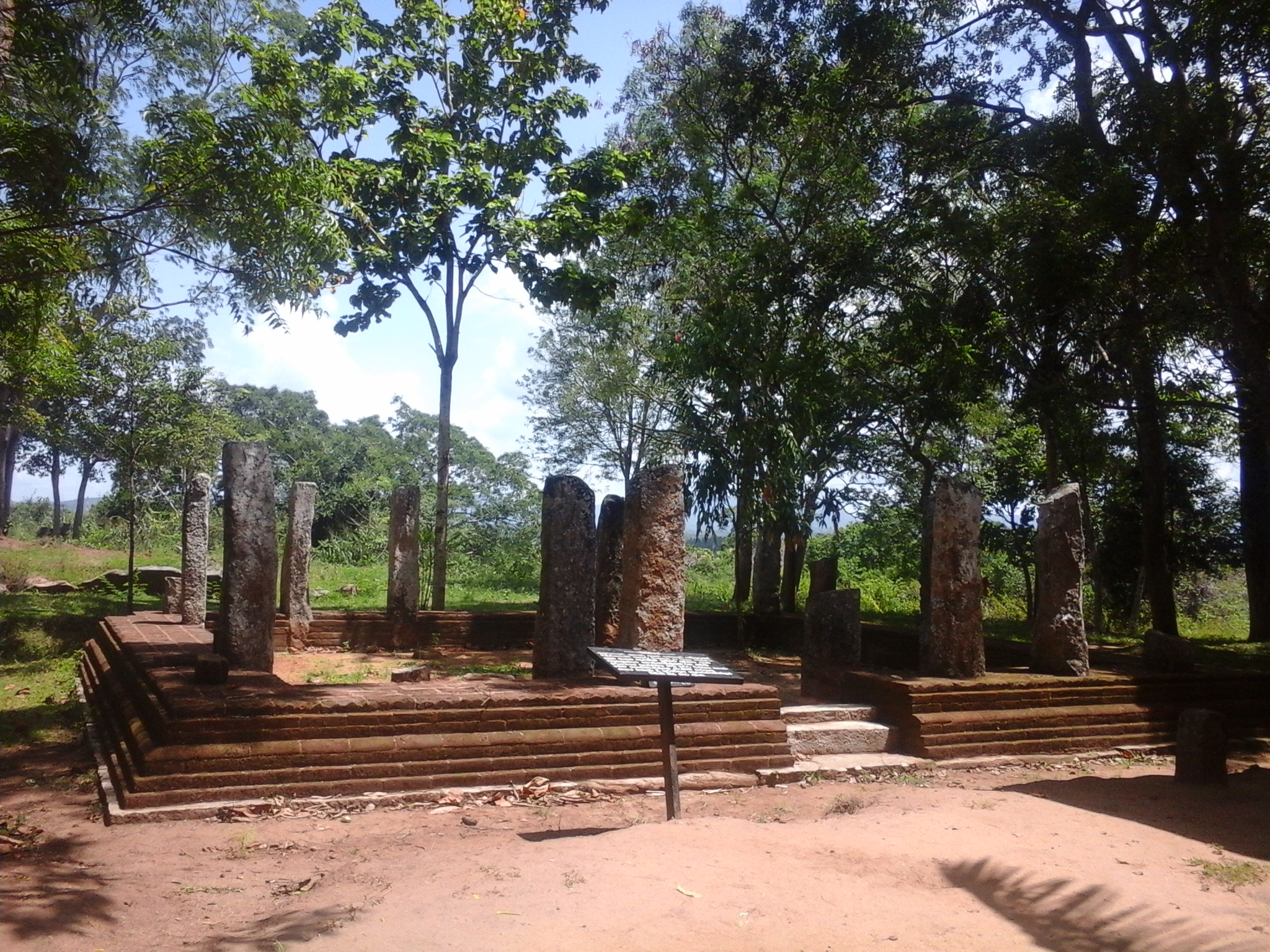
Image house, which belongs to Anuradhapura era

It is believed that this temple was built by the Kings Gotabhaya and Mahananga. According to inscriptions found in the vihara premises, this temple was called as Kala Pabbatha Vihara. The Bodhi tree of Naigala Rajamaha Viharaya is believed to be one of saplings of the Sri Maha Bodhi and was planted by arahant.

A folklore, which connects with King Mahanaga describes a story about the formation of the name of this temple. According to that in the period of King Devanapathisa, Mahanaga came to this area and built a palace in Mandaduwata. In that times a big drought came and caused to make tanks, streams dried up. One day a big snake came in front of the king and brought him to a large rock, where king saw a pond filled with water. After that incident this area was called as Naya Penvu Gala (The rock, showed by the snake) and then named as Naigala.

== Ruins ==
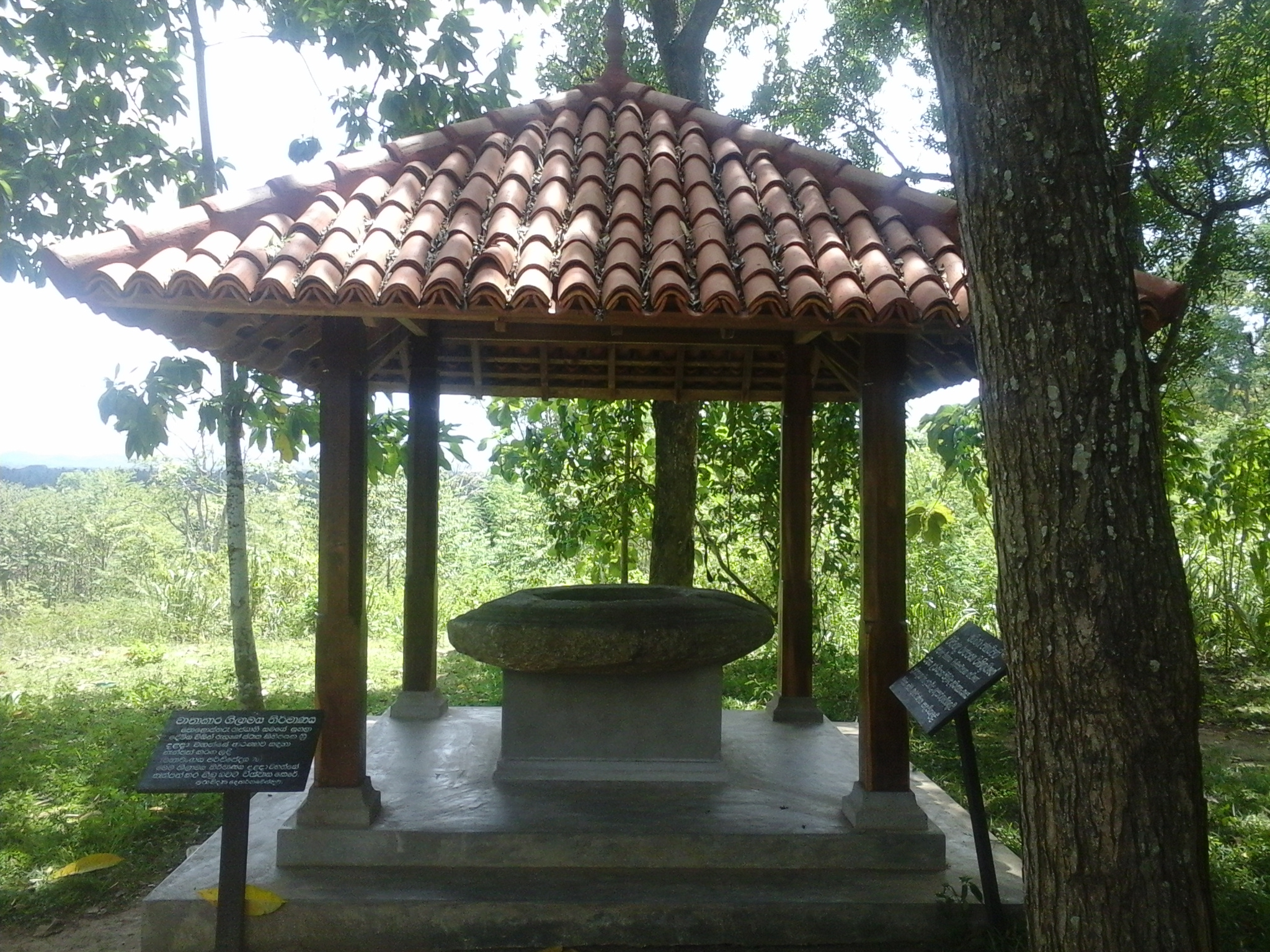
Circular shaped stone hollow

A number of archeological monuments and ruins were discovered in this temple after excavations, done by the Archaeological Department in 2009. Many of ruins including Stupas, walls, Boodhigaras and ponds can be seen at the vihara premises. Also there is a specific circular stone with a hollow can be seen at temple and it is believed that this was used to hide the tooth relic of Buddha inside it, by Queen Sugala to protect it from enemies. In 2013, archaeologists found ruins of a two-story image house on the temple premises, which belongs to the Anuradhapura period.

== Vihara inscriptions ==
=== rock inscription 1 ===
Period: 3rd-4th centuries AD, Script: Later Brahmi, Language: Old Sinhala
Content: "Donated Kahavanu for the festival of Ariyavansa to Kalapavata (Kala Parvata) monastery. The inscription is damaged and more complete reading is not possible"

=== rock inscription 2 ===
Period: 4th-5th centuries AD, Script: Later Brahmi, Language: Old Sinhala
Content: "The slaves of kalapavata (Kala Parvata) temple were freed from compulsory service by monk of Mahawaka who donated one hundred Kahavanu coins. The merit of this action was to be shared by all beings"
