= Rajapaksa Central College =

- රාජපක්ෂ මධ්‍ය විද්‍යාලය

Location
- Weeraketiya, Hambanthota; Sri Lanka
- 6°08′10″N 80°46′26″E

Information
- Type: National
- Motto: Sinhala: නොනැවත ඉදිරියටම ("Do not tarry, Go forward")
- Established: 1940
- Founder: C. W. W. Kannangara
- School district: Hambantota
- Principal: Sampath Prasanna Batugedara
- Staff: 183 (2018)
- Grades: Class 6 - 13
- Gender: Mix
- Age: 11 to 19
- Enrollment: 5000
- Colours: Maroon and gold
- Alumni: Rajapakshians; RCC
- Website: rmulive.com

Rajapaksa Central College (Sinhala: රාජපක්ෂ මධ්‍ය විද්‍යාලය), located in the Hambantota district, Southern Province of Sri Lanka, was established in 1940 as one of the first central colleges by C. W. W. Kannangara. It is a mixed school with a current student population of over 4000. It is one of first five Central Colleges in Sri Lanka. It is named in honour of D. M. Rajapaksa, who was a Sri Lankan politician and Member of Parliament who represented the Beliatta electorate in Hambantota district from 1947 to 1965. Today, this institution has established itself as one of the top 50 schools on the island.

== Sports ==
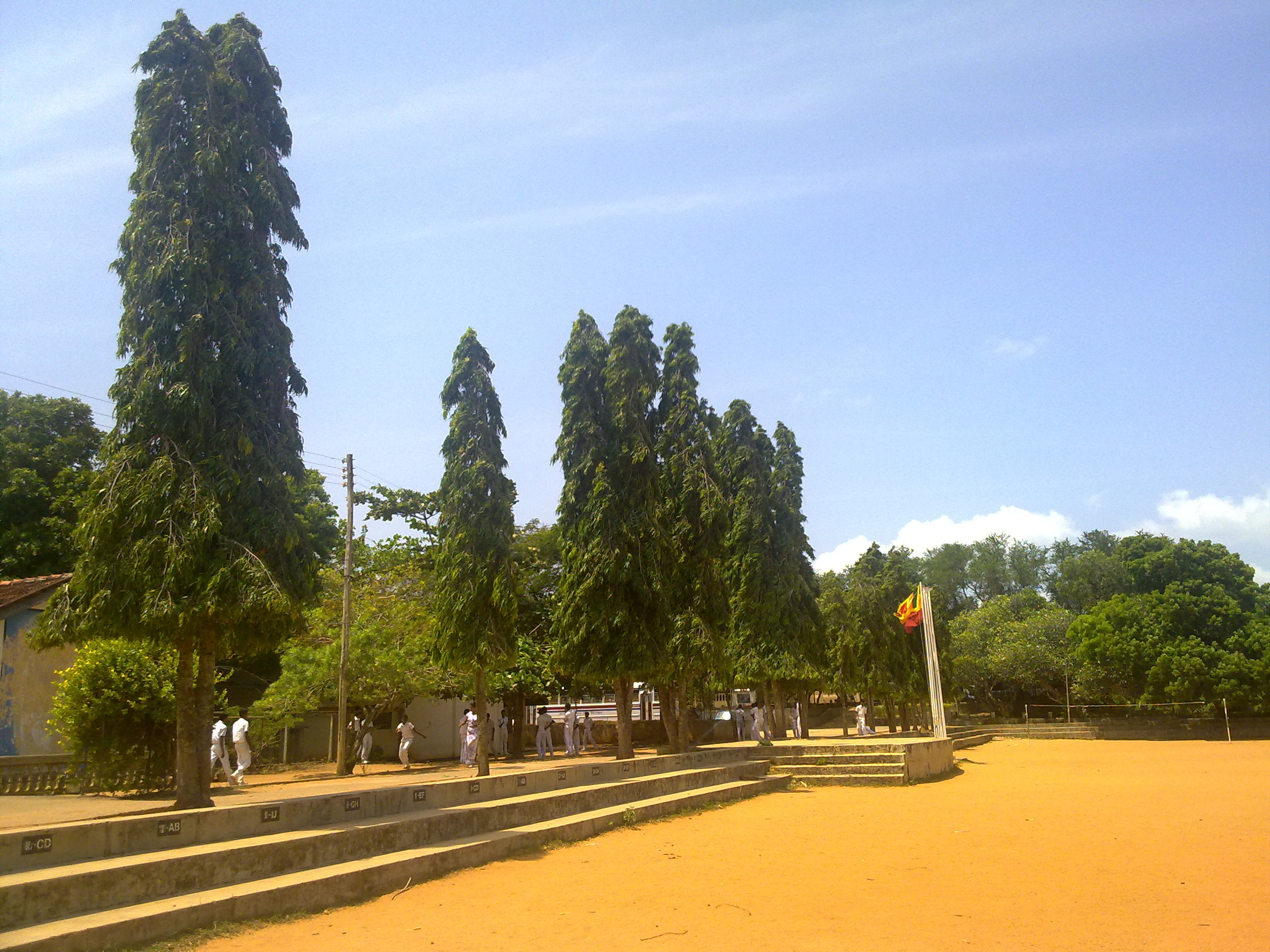
College Play Ground

=== Battle of the Golds Ruhuna ===
Rajapaksha Central College plays its annual Big Match with Vijitha Central College, Dickwella. It is also known as Golden Battle of Ruhuna.

=== Battle of the Ruhunu Maroons ===
Rajapaksa Central College plays is annual Big Match with Debarawea Central College, Tissamaharama. It known as Battle of the Ruhunu Maroons (2023–present).

== Annual Sports Meet ==
The students are divided into four houses named

- Sheela
- Samadhi
- Pragna
- Weerya

The last Sports Meet in 2016 was won by Weerya for the first time in the school history, and runners-up were Sheela. In 2014, Winners were Pragna, runners-up was Weerya. In 2012, Winners were Samadhi and runners-up was Sheela. In 2010, Winners were Sheela.

== RCC Legends Cricket League ==
The RCC Legends Cricket League is an annual cricket tournament organized by Past Pupils Cricket Association of Rajapakshe Central College. The tournament is initiated in the year 2021.

== Gallery ==
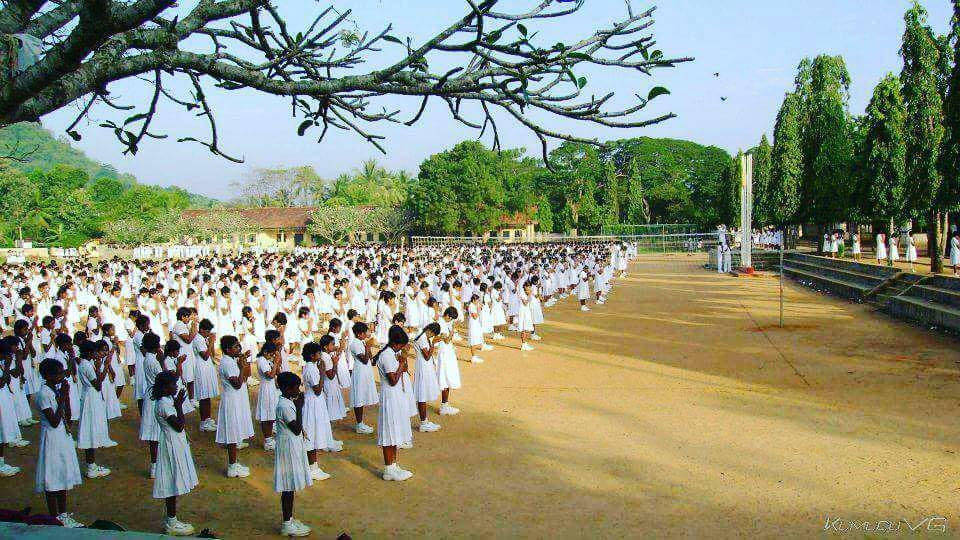
Morning Assembly in College Ground

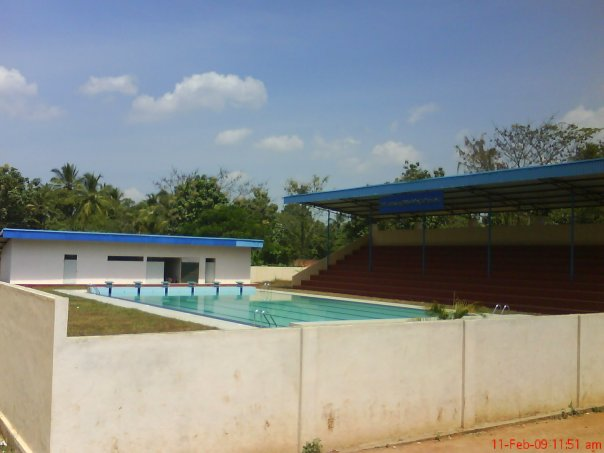
Swimming Pool

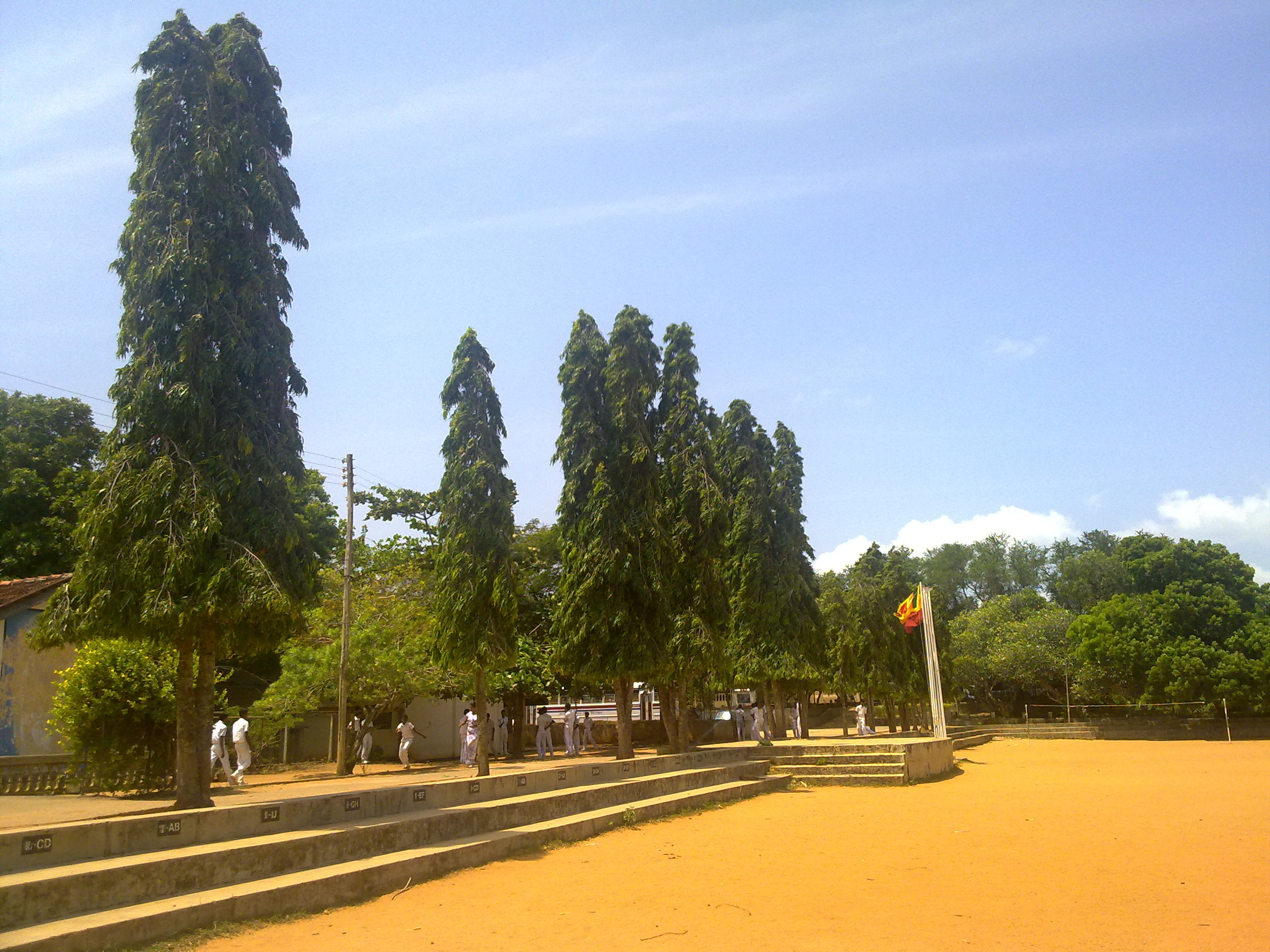
Play Ground

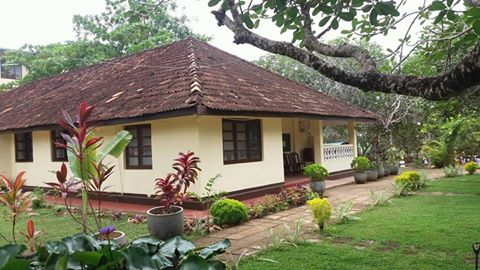
Principal's Main Office

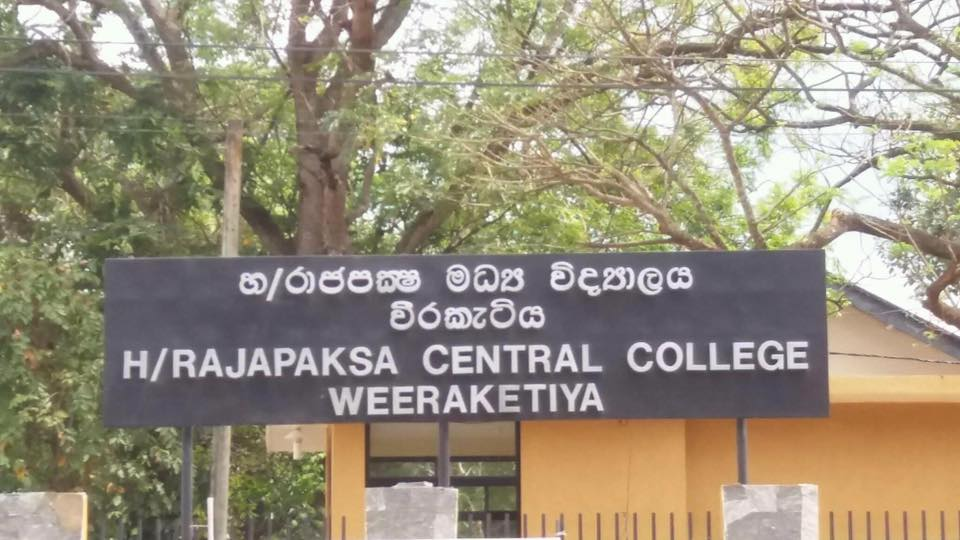
School Name Board
