= Weerahela Grama Niladhari Division =

Weerahela
- Grama Niladhari Division
- Interactive map of Weerahela
- Coordinates: 6.324509°N 81.304879°E
- Country: Sri Lanka
- Province: Southern Province
- District: Hambantota District
- Divisional Secretariat: Thissamaharama Divisional Secretariat
- Electoral District: Hambantota Electoral District
- Polling Division: Thissamaharama Polling Division

Area
  - Total: 5.02 km^{2} (1.94 sq mi)
- Elevation: 45 m (148 ft)

Population (2012)
  - Total: 2,550
  - Density: 508/km^{2} (1,320/sq mi)
- ISO 3166 code: LK-3309025

Weerahela

Weerahela Grama Niladhari Division is a Grama Niladhari Division of the Thissamaharama Divisional Secretariat of Hambantota District of Southern Province, Sri Lanka . It has Grama Niladhari Division Code 44.

Weerahela is a surrounded by the Saliyapura, Jayagama, Saddhathissapura New Town, Saddhathissapura, Saddhathissapura, Mahasenpura and Joolpallama Grama Niladhari Divisions.

== Demographics ==
=== Ethnicity ===
The Weerahela Grama Niladhari Division has a Sinhalese majority (94.9%) . In comparison, the Thissamaharama Divisional Secretariat (which contains the Weerahela Grama Niladhari Division) has a Sinhalese majority (96.6%)

Ethnicity in Weerahela
1. Sinhalese (94.9%)
2. Sri Lankan Tamil (5.10%)
3. Other (0.00%)

=== Religion ===
The Weerahela Grama Niladhari Division has a Buddhist majority (97.3%) . In comparison, the Thissamaharama Divisional Secretariat (which contains the Weerahela Grama Niladhari Division) has a Buddhist majority (96.0%)

Religion in Weerahela
1. Buddhist (97.3%)
2. Hindu (1.80%)
3. Other (0.90%)
