= Hambantota Sharks =

(Sri Lanka) Hambantota Sharks
- Full name: Hambantota Sharks Sports Club
- Union: Sri Lanka Rugby Football Union
- Founded: 2013
- Disbanded: 2015
- Location: Sri Lanka
- Region: Hambantota District
- Ground(s): Beliatta National Stadium
- President: Johan Fernando
- Coach(es): Nilfer Ibrahim
- Captain(s): Janik Jayasuriya
- League(s): Dialog Rugby League; Clifford Cup; Dialog Club Rugby Sevens
- 2013/14 Dialog Rugby League season: 9

Hambantota Sharks Sports Club was a former Division 'A' rugby union team based in Sri Lanka, that competed in the Dialog Rugby League.

The Hambantota Sharks Sports Club was launched on 15 May 2013 at Cinnamon Grand Hotel, Colombo. The President of the club is Johan Fernado, whilst the coach was announced as Nihal Gunaratne. K. D. U. Adventures (Pvt Ltd) are the major sponsor of the club, with their home games to be played at Beliatta National Stadium.

The Hambantota Sharks first official scheduled game in the Dialog Rugby League was to occur at Havelock Park, against the league titleholders, Havelock Sports Club however it was abandoned due to a power failure at the grounds. Their debut match was held on 24 November 2013 against Air Force SC at the newly constructed Beliatta National Stadium. The game ended in a 13-13 draw. In December 2013 Nilfer Ibrahim took over as the coach of the club. The Hambantota Sharks finished the 2013/14 season in ninth place with a 1 win, ten loss record, having beaten only Colombo H & FC and drawing with Air Force SC.

On the 28 January 2015 the Sharks announced that they were withdrawing from the 2014/15 Dialog Rugby League, midway through the season, due to concerns over players injuries. They became the second team to withdraw from Division 'A' competition, following a similar decision by the Colombo Hockey and Football Club, reducing the league down to a seven team contest. In the 2014/15 season the Sharks competed in eight matches, losing six and winning two. The team's coach, Nilfer Ibrahim, stated "that the team will be coming back to the competition next season." The club then released its contracted player to play for other league teams. Ibrahim was subsequently appointed as the coach of Isipathana College and the coach of the national under-19 rugby union team.
