= Hambantota gallows =

Hambantota gallows (Sinhala: හම්බන්තොට එල්ලුම් ගස) is a gallows tree, located on a small hill, close to the fisheries harbour of Hambantota, Sri Lanka. It is a solitary 30 ft (9.1 m) pole, which functioned as the gallows, erected by the British during the early 19th century. The gallows is located in the same area as the Government Agent's bungalow, the light house and Martello tower. It is the only gallows tree currently found in an open area in the country and was constructed at the rear of then British Army Commander's official residence, facing the sea.

Following the 1818 Uva–Wellassa rebellion was started by farmers in Wellassa. The British controlled it and captured the rural leaders who led the rebellion. Although they shot those rebels, due to lack of bullets, they felt the necessity of a gallows tree. The gallows consists of an oak pole fastened on an iron base. A fence was erected around it in order to control spectators during executions. The gallows tree was used to hang the rebels that joined the Wellassa rebellion and various other criminals.

According to historical records, about seven convicts were hanged at this gallows during Leonard Woolf’s tenure (1908–1911) as the Government Agent in Hambantota. It was said that Woolf watched the people hanging there from the upper floor of his official residence.

In 2014 the Archaeology Department commenced conservation of the gallows and a guard room. It was declared an Archaeological Protected Monument by the government on 25 March 2016.

== See also ==
- Hambantota Lighthouse
- Martello tower
