= Sooriyawewa =

Coordinates: 6°19′N 81°00′E

- Town
- Interactive map of Sooriyawewa
- Country: Sri Lanka
- Province: Southern Province
- District: Hambantota District
- Divisional Secretariat: Sooriyawewa Divisional Secretariat
- Time zone: +4.73
- Postal code: 82010

Sooriyawewa is a town located in the Hambantota District of Sri Lanka.

Sooriyawewa is largest town in Hambantota district.

Mahinda Rajapaksha international cricket ststadium is located here

E-WIS has set up Sri Lanka's first PC manufacturing plant – at Sooriyawewa.

Sooriyawewa Madunagala Mahapalassa Hot Water Springs is situated here.

Sooriyawewa is the largest economic center of Hambantota

General Sir John Kotelawala Defence University, Southern Campus is situated here.

Mahamevnawa Buddhist Monastery - Sooriyawewa is stuted here.

== Notable people ==
- Nimali Liyanarachchi, runner, was born here in 1989.
