= Godavaya =

Godavaya or Godawaya is a small fishing hamlet located at the mouth of the Walawe river, between Ambalantota and Hambantota in the Hambantota District in southern Sri Lanka.

It received its name, originally Goda Pavata Pattana or Gota Pabbata Pattana (meaning 'small rock harbour') from a huge rock overlooking the Indian Ocean, at the foot of which it is situated. The original harbour town was an entrepot on the Maritime Silk Road from at least the 2nd century CE.

It has been the site of extensive excavations by German and Sri Lanka Archaeologists since 1994.

Godavaya is also the site if a wildlife sanctuary. The beach is important for nesting leatherback turtles.

== History ==
The Godavaya area has been inhabited for about 7000 years. In August 2008, a human skeleton dating back to 3000-5000 BC (carbon dating has yet to be done) was discovered in an abandoned stone quarry at Godavaya, together with tools of animal-bone and stone. In honour of the discoverer of the site, German archaeologist Oliver Kessler, the skeletons were named Olli 1 -3.

The settlement of Goda Pavata Pattana, lay sandwiched on the peninsula between the inland harbour on the Walawe river and the sea harbour on the bay of Godavaya. Trade was an important component in the economy of ancient Sri Lanka and Godavaya was an important maritime settlement, serving Tissamaharama and Ridiyagama in the kingdom of Ruhuna.

The Godavaya port probably pre-dates a Brahmi script inscription of the 2nd-century king Gamani Abaya, probably Gajabahu I, which states that the customs duties obtained there were dedicated to the Buddhist monastery, the Godapavata Vihara.

However, in the Mahawamsa's chapter on 'The 12 kings', it is claimed that the vihara at Gotapabbata was one of the seven monasteries that Mahallaka Naga built after his son-in-law Gajabahu's death.

In ancient times, Sri Lanka exported dark red garnets, which have been found as burial objects in many European graves of the early mediaeval period. Recent research reveals that most of those garnets were from India and Sri Lanka. Godavaya had ease of access via the Walawe river to the gem mining area of the Walawe basin, which is a source of garnets.

Until the 6th century, Godavaya was an important transit port. Ships carrying merchandise from the West exchanged commodities with ships from China carrying silk. Hence, ships did not need to go further than Godavaya. Articles of trade on the Walawe river shipping route and on land routes were also swapped there.

Godavaya was the seaport for the mediaeval (11th century) southern capital, Maha Nagakula which lay on the Walawe river.

== Excavations ==
From 1994 onwards, a team of German archaeologists from the University of Bonn directed by late Prof. Dr. Helmut Roth, Dr. Udo Recker (1994–1996) and Oliver Kessler M.A. (1997 onwards) conducted joint excavations at Godavaya with the Archaeological Department of Sri Lanka, under Director General Dr. W.H. Wijeyapala and the German Archaeological Institute (DAI). They unearthed evidence to prove Godavaya's importance in the maritime Silk Route, revealing connections from China in the east to the Red Sea and to Europe in the west.

Among the finds have been:

- Sassanian (Persian)
- Roman coins and Han pottery
- beads and bangles
- bricks showing guild marks in the shape of an 'O'
- an ancient landing jetty constructed on stone pillars up to 3.50 metres high
- a large ancient stone anchor discovered underwater

=== Gota Pabbata Rajamaha Vihara Monastery ===
On top of the rock overlooking the entire area lay the monastery, the Gota Pabbatha Rajamaha Vihara, which had been a religious and administrative centre since the reign of King Gajabahu I. The Brahmi inscription on a rock next to the ancient shrine room is unique, being the sole evidence for the transfer of customs duties to a monastery in the Indian Ocean world at that period.

Normally, only the king was allowed to collect taxes. In Godavaya, the tax fees were donated to the temple for its maintenance.

The monastery area was excavated by a team under Oliver Kessler, who discovered an elevated ancient image house (Buddhu gedera) and a chapter house (Dharma salawa) on the west side of the monastery. They found a standing Buddha statue about 3.50 metres tall and two Bodhisattva statues each about 1.80 metres in height. Traces of weather-resistant colouring - the source of which is unclear - are evidence that the statues date back to a period before the 8th century.

=== Customs house ===
The team found a custom office building, decorated with ornaments showing an elephant placing his trunk in lotus flowers. Clay seals bearing the emblem of a lion were used to seal goods and cargo as proof that the customs duty was paid.

=== Quarry ===
A quarry was also discovered. One big pillar covered with many drill marks dating to the middle Anuradhapura period before the 5th century, lies in front of the huge rock, close to the ocean.

=== Shipwreck ===
In late 2008, an underwater search of the seas around Godavaya, carried out by the Central Cultural Fund, revealed the wreck of a ship, possibly dating back to 2nd century BC-1st century AD. Together with the ship were found black and red ware pottery - dating from the 2nd century BC to the 4th century - together with a stone throne and coloured ball clay for making painted roofing tiles.

== Godavaya wildlife sanctuary ==
Godavaya is home to five of the seven global marine turtle species: hawksbill, leatherback, green turtle, loggerhead and olive ridley turtle, which are all threatened. It has been proposed that the leatherback turtles of Sri Lanka and the Nicobar Islands form a separate, genetically distinct Indian Ocean subpopulation. Godavaya beach is possibly the best leatherback turtle nesting beach in the island, with the largest nesting population.

A 3.85 kilometre section of the beach at Godavaya was declared a wildlife sanctuary ('Godavaya Sanctuary') by the Government of Sri Lanka under the Fauna and Flora Protection Ordinance on 10 May 2006. It extends 500 metres into the sea and 100 metres from the high tide level onto the land.

The seaward limit includes the turtles' aquatic habitat (mainly coral reefs where they forage and rest), while the land limit envelopes their land Nesting habitat.

== Tsunami ==
When the Boxing Day tsunami of 2004 struck Sri Lanka, the villagers of the fishing hamlet, among them two archaeologists, took refuge in the temple on the rock. This probably contributed to the lack of fatalities, contrasting with the thousands of deaths in the surrounding areas.
