= Katuwana Divisional Secretariat =

- Divisional Secretariat
- Interactive map of Katuwana Divisional Secretariat
- Country: Sri Lanka
- Province: Southern Province
- District: Hambantota District
- Time zone: UTC+5:30 (Sri Lanka Standard Time)

Katuwana Divisional Secretariat is a Divisional Secretariat of Hambantota District, of Southern Province, Sri Lanka.

== Demography ==
Religion in Katuwana DS Division (2012)
1. Buddhist (99.9%)
2. Hindu (0.10%)
3. Muslim (0.00%)
4. Roman Catholic (0.00%)
5. Other Christian (0.00%)
6. Other (0.00%)
