= Weeraketiya =

- Town
- Location within Sri Lanka
- Coordinates: 6°10′0″N 80°44′48″E
- Country: Sri Lanka
- Province: Southern Province
- District: Hambantota
- Time zone: UTC+5:30 (Sri Lanka Standard Time)

Weeraketiya is a small town in Hambantota District, Southern Province in southern Sri Lanka, about 18 kilometres (11 mi) by road north of Tangalle. It is known for being the birthplace of Mahinda Rajapaksa. The town belongs to Weeraketiya Divisional Secretariat.

== History ==
The St. Joseph's Estate, operated in Weeraketiya during the colonial times, produced tomatoes and coconuts. In 1969, the Germans funded the installation of medium-wave 50 kilowatt transmitters at Maho and Weeraketiya. It was installed by the first quarter of 1970.

== Landmarks ==
The town lies around the Udakiriwila Tank (lake). The Seegala Temple of Pillars lies near its western bank. The town contains the Rajapaksha Central College and a National Youth Corps Training Center. To the south of the tank is Weeraketiya Hospital, Singapore Friendship College and the Teacher Training Center and Weerakatiya Rajapaksha Central College.

== See also ==
- List of towns in Southern Province, Sri Lanka
