= Kasagala Raja Maha Vihara =

Buddhist Temple in Angunukolapelessa, Sri Lanka

- කසාගල රජ මහා විහාරය
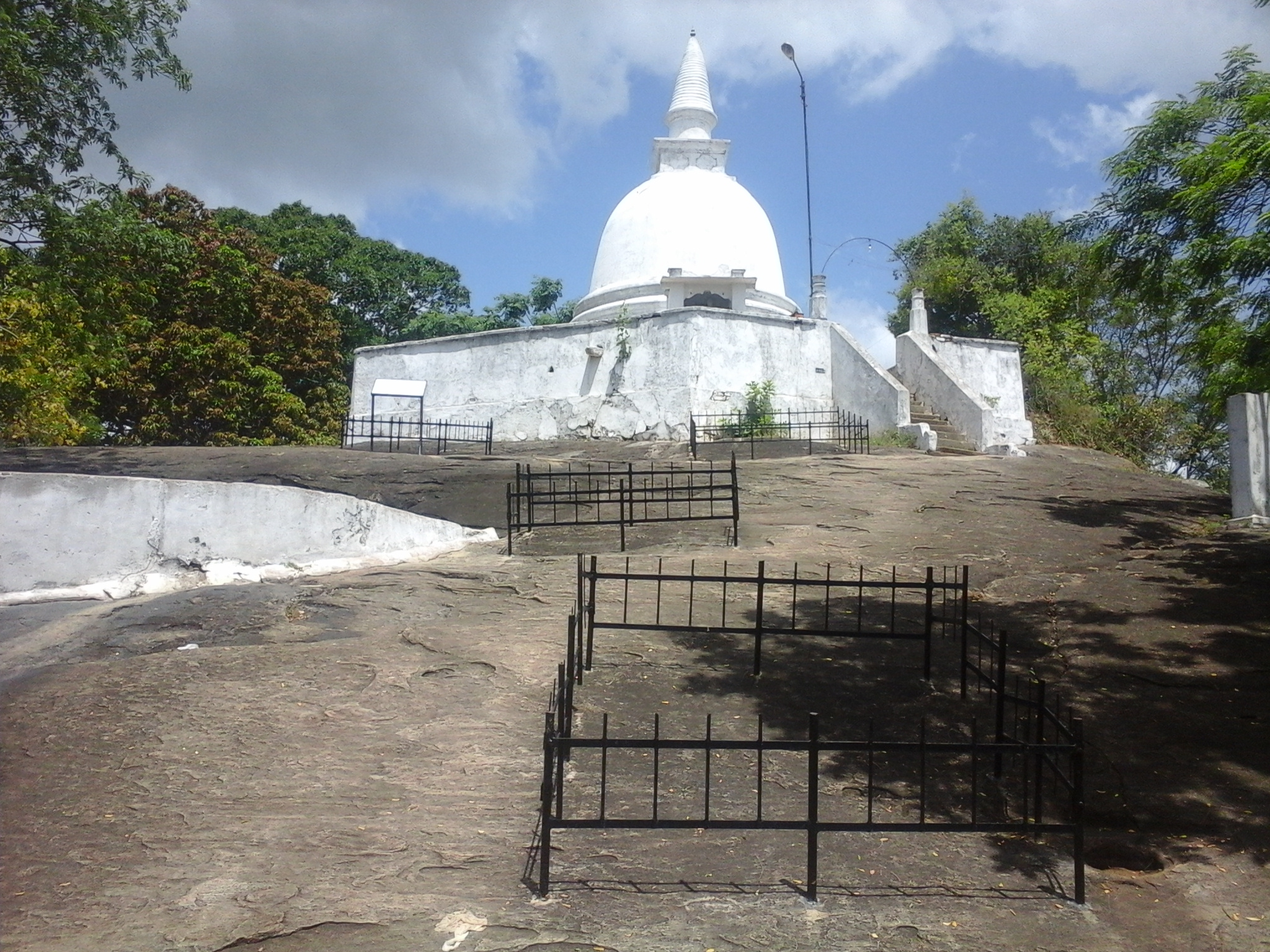
- The Stupa and rock inscriptions

Religion
- Affiliation: Buddhism
- District: Hambantota
- Province: Southern Province

Location
- Location: Angunukolapelessa, Sri Lanka
- Country: Sri Lanka
- Interactive map of Kasagala Raja Maha Vihara
- Coordinates: 06°08′10.9″N 80°48′45.0″E

Architecture
- Type: Buddhist Temple
- Founder: King Devanampiya Tissa

Kasagala Raja Maha Vihara (Sinhala: කසාගල රජ මහා විහාරය) is an ancient Buddhist Temple, situated in Angunukolapelessa, Hambantota District, Sri Lanka. It is situated about 10 km (6.2 mi) away from Ranna Junction along Ranna - Weeraketiya road. The temple has been formally recognised by the Government as an archaeological site in Sri Lanka. The designation was declared on 6 June 2008 under the government Gazette number 1553.

== History ==
It is accepted that the Kasagala Raja Maha Vihara was constructed during the Anuradhapura era in the reign of King Kavan Tissa (205–161 BC). But it is also believed that the Vihara was begun with planting of one of 32 saplings of the sacred Sri Maha Bodhi (Dethispala Bodhi Tree) in this land with patronage of King Devanampiya Tissa (307–267 BC) in the third century B.C. According to the chronicles King Kavantissa (205–161 BC) has constructed several buildings there and later they were further renovated and expanded with adding new features by King Dappula I (661–664) and King Vijayabahu I (1055-1110 AD). During the reign of King Kirti Sri Rajasingha (1747 – 1780 AD), a gilt Buddha image and temporalities were donated to the temple and had conducted a Dalada Perahera (a pageant) as a tribute to the Tooth Relic of Buddha.

== Name ==
According to local folklore the name Kasagala (The yellow rock) has been derived as monks who lived there had dried their saffron colored robes on the slabs of natural rock where the temple is situated. It is said that these robes were seen as saffron colored rocks from far way and thus people had used to call the temple as Kasagala.

Beside above folklore an inscription which belongs to 2 AD and related with the temple, refers that this temple was known as Kawagala Pabbatha in early periods.

== The Temple ==
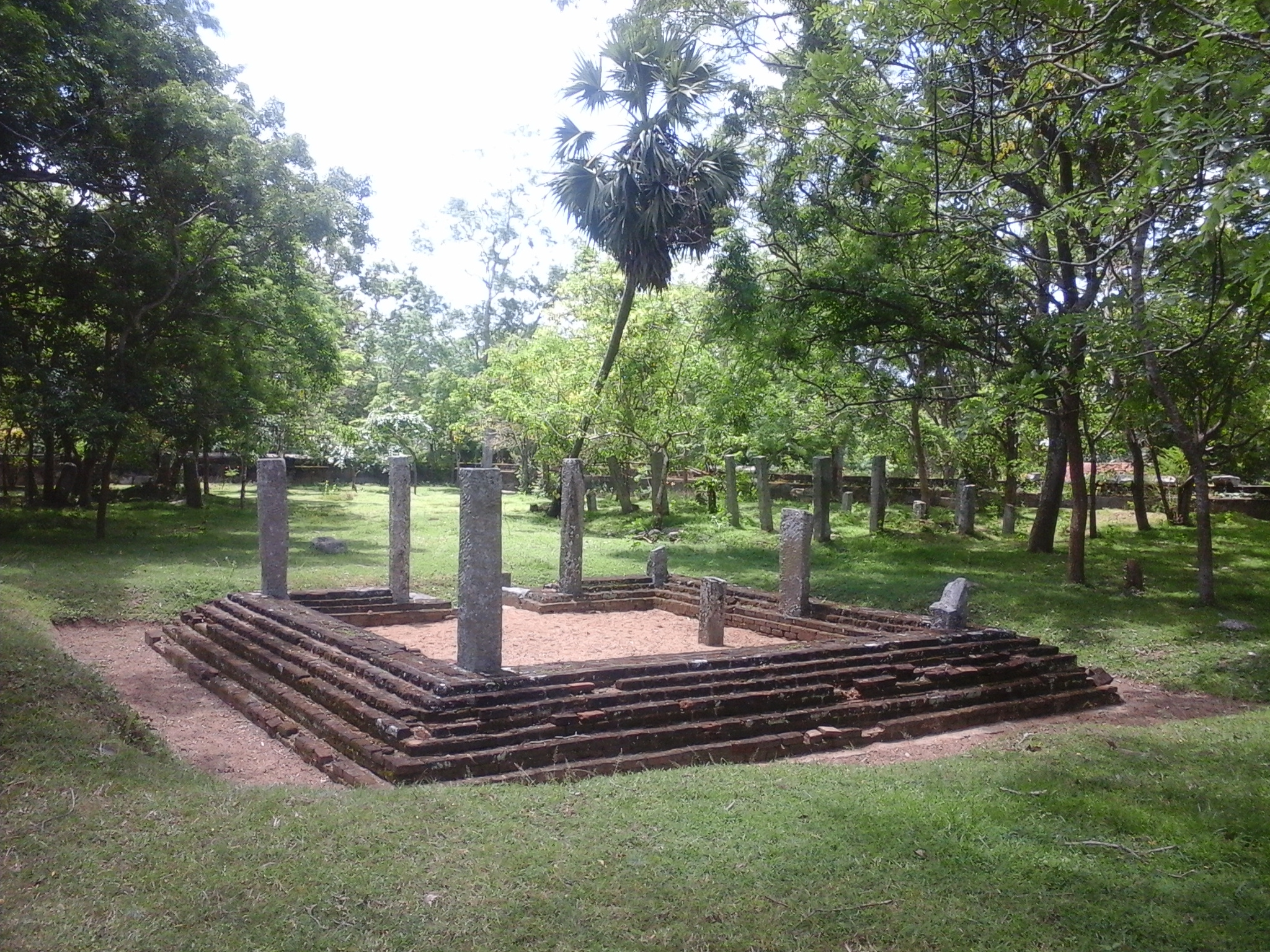
Ruins at the Vihara premises

Currently two ancient Stupas can be seen in the Vihara premises. One of that which situated on the top of the rocky plateau is believed to be constructed by king Devanampiya tissa and is considered as the oldest Stupa in the Vihara. The other Stupa is situated nearby has been constructed by king Saddha Tissa (137-119 BC), brother of King Dutugamunu. Near to the upper rocky plateau Stupa, six stone inscriptions have been found. The information included in all six inscriptions appears to be on the style of granting liberty from slavery (Vaharala).

The temple is adorned with paintings and sculptures belonging to Kandyan tradition, display unique artistic features of the maritime provinces. The paintings mainly show Southern and transition artistic styles, influenced with European Cultural traits and new art styles.

== Kasagala rock inscriptions ==
Period: 4th-5th centuries AD, Script: Late Brahmi, Language: Early Sinhala
Contents: "There are six inscriptions written on the rock face and the data included in all six inscriptions appears to be on the style of granting liberty from slavery (Vaharala). Most of the letterings are worn; hence it is impossible to get a clear complete idea of the interpretations"

== See also ==
- Kasagala Museum
