= Hambantota Lighthouse =

- Location: Hambantota; Southern Province; Sri Lanka
- Coordinates: 6°07′19.2″N 81°07′37.6″E

Tower
- Constructed: 1913
- Construction: concrete and stone
- Height: 14 metres (46 ft)
- Shape: cylindrical tower with gallery and lantern
- Markings: black and white tower and lantern

Light
- Focal height: 15 metres (49 ft)
- Range: 13 nautical miles (24 km; 15 mi)

Hambantota Lighthouse (Sinhala: හම්බන්තොට ප්‍රදීපාගාරය) is an onshore lighthouse, located on a rocky promontory in Hambantota, Sri Lanka.

The lighthouse is a round masonry tower, 14 m (46 ft) high, with a lantern and a gallery, constructed in 1913. It was designed by William Douglass and built by the Trinity House Engineering Company. The lighthouse station was established in 1903.

The stonework, which was used in constructing the lighthouse, is laid in such a way to give an impression of a black and white spiral on the tower. The lighthouse was operational until 1977 but is no longer functional. In 2012 lighthouses were constructed on the eastern and western breakwaters of the Hambantota port.

The tower was restored in 1999, with the stonework being painted over in black and white. In the past, the lighthouse formed part of an office of the Hambantota Kachcheri, where the Land Registry branch was housed.

The lighthouse was declared an Archaeological Protected Monument by the government on 25 March 2016.

== See also ==
- List of lighthouses in Sri Lanka
- Martello tower
