= Gajaman Nona =

Sri Lankan poet (1746–1815)

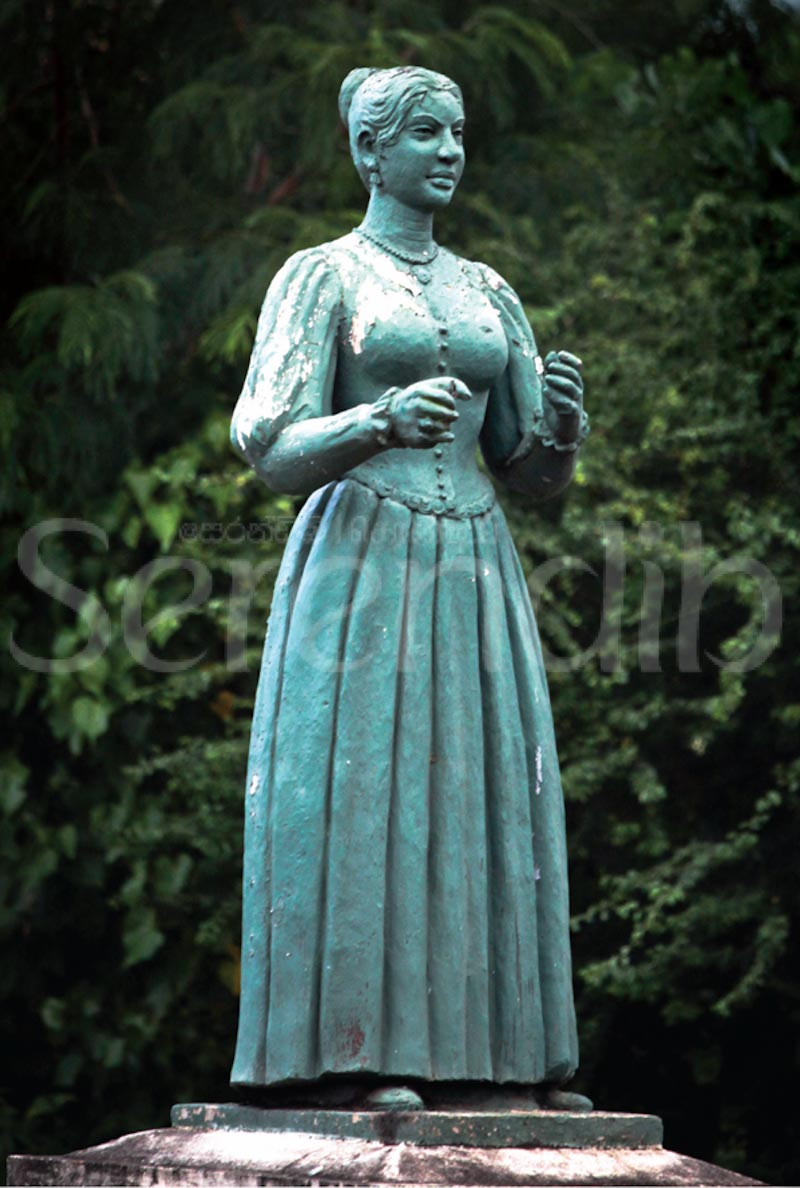
- A statue of Gajaman Nona at Nonagama Junction, Ambalantota
- Born: Donna Isabella Koraneliya; 10 March 1746; Kollupitiya, Ceylon
- Died: 15 December 1815 (aged 69); Ceylon
- Occupation: Poet
- Spouse: Thalpe Merenchegei Garadiya Arachchi
- Parent(s): Don Francisco Senarathna Kumara Perumal, Francina Jasenthu Graivo

Donna Isabella Koraneliya (Sinhala: දෝන ඉසබෙලා කොරනෙලියා) (a.k.a. Gajaman Nona) (10 March 1746 – 15 December 1815) was a Sri Lankan poet of the Matara Era, noted for her ability to create impromptu Sinhala poetry.

== Childhood ==
She was born in Kollupitiya, Ceylon as the second daughter of Don Francisco Senarathna Kumara Perumal and Francina Jasenthu Graivo. Gajaman was baptised as Donna Isabella Koraneliya at St. Paul's Church, Milagiriya in Bambalapitiya. She was brought to Kahawatta in Beliatta as her father was undertaking Rājākariya. She grew up in Weragampita, Matara, where her father served as the Thombu Arachchi (officer in charge of land registry). Her father became known as Gajaman Arachchi, hence she inherited the title Gajaman Nona (Lady Gajaman) after the death of her mother.

== Education ==
She had her early education within her own family and then from Milagiriya Church School (currently known as St. Paul's Girls' School).

After moving to Matara, she visited the Weragampita Temple to study more about literature. Since women weren't allowed to be taught at temples, she disguised herself as a boy and got educated under Koratotha Dharmarama Thero. It was here where she mastered the art of writing poetry.

== Works ==
Her talents were noticed at an early age when someone hid her water pot, and she wrote this Sinhala poem:

පුංචි රුවන් පුංචි රුවන් පුංචි කලේ
වතුර අරන් ළිඳ උඩ තිබූවාය කලේ
අට පහ නොදන්නා ජඩයෙකි මේක කලේ
ගෙදර යන්න දෙනවාද මගේ පුංචි කලේ

Little golden pot, filled with water
And left on the edge of the well,
The one who hid it is a scoundrel who can't count to five or eight!
Will you give back my little pot, so that I can go home?

— English translation

Her poetry is noted for its emotional depth, lyrical beauty, and social commentary. She often wrote about love, nature, and the social issues of her time. Some of them were powerful and some were harsh and sarcastic. She also displayed a strong sense of humour. Some of her well-known works include "Gajaman Kavi," "Dedi Soka Malaya" containing 206 verses, "Denipitiye Nuga Ruka Vanuma" (the banyan tree in Denepitiya) and the poetic petition to John D'Oyly.

== Personal life ==
Being elegant and charming, Gajaman Nona was able to catch the attraction of many noblemen. While many men sought her hand, she rejected them through poems. She had a close poetic relationship with Elapatha Mudaliyar of Ratnapura District who was also a student of Dhammarama Thero.

At a young age, she married Thalpe Merenchegei Garadiya Arachchi. He died leaving Gajaman Nona almost destitute. Years later, she married Hendrick Siriwardena Wijaya Wimalasekera who also died. She became a widow with four sons from both marriages. She had to find her income by writing poems and teaching poetry. With time, her children too died. The premature deaths of her children left her sad and destitute. Therefore, she wrote an appeal in poetry to the then British Government Agent in Matara. Sir John D’Oyly, who gifted her a land (nindagama) and named it Nonagama that helped her and her siblings live quietly.

She died on 15 December 1815 at the age of 69.

== Legacy ==
Gajaman Nona is often regarded as one of the foremost female poets in Sri Lankan history. Her works have been studied and appreciated for their literary value and their insight into the culture and society of her time. A statue of her stands at Ambalantota, Nonagama Junction (the name derived from Gajaman Nona) is situated at that nindagama.

The television series, Gajaman Nona, broadcast by Rupavahini depicted her life story. Her portrait was painted by Vasanthi Chathurani.

There are songs written about her by Sri Lankan artists such as Karunarathna Divulgane and Yohani.
