= Ambalantota Divisional Secretariat =

- Divisional Secretariat
- Interactive map of Ambalantota Divisional Secretariat
- Coordinates: 6°10′07″N 80°57′52″E
- Country: Sri Lanka
- Province: Southern Province
- District: Hambantota District
- Time zone: UTC+5:30 (Sri Lanka Standard Time)

Ambalantota Divisional Secretariat is a Divisional Secretariat of Hambantota District, of Southern Province, Sri Lanka.

== Demography ==
Religion in Ambalantota DS Division (2012)
1. Buddhist (97.0%)
2. Hindu (0.30%)
3. Muslim (2.20%)
4. Roman Catholic (0.20%)
5. Other Christian (0.30%)
6. Other (0.00%)
