= Kasagala Museum =

Kasagala Archaeological Museum
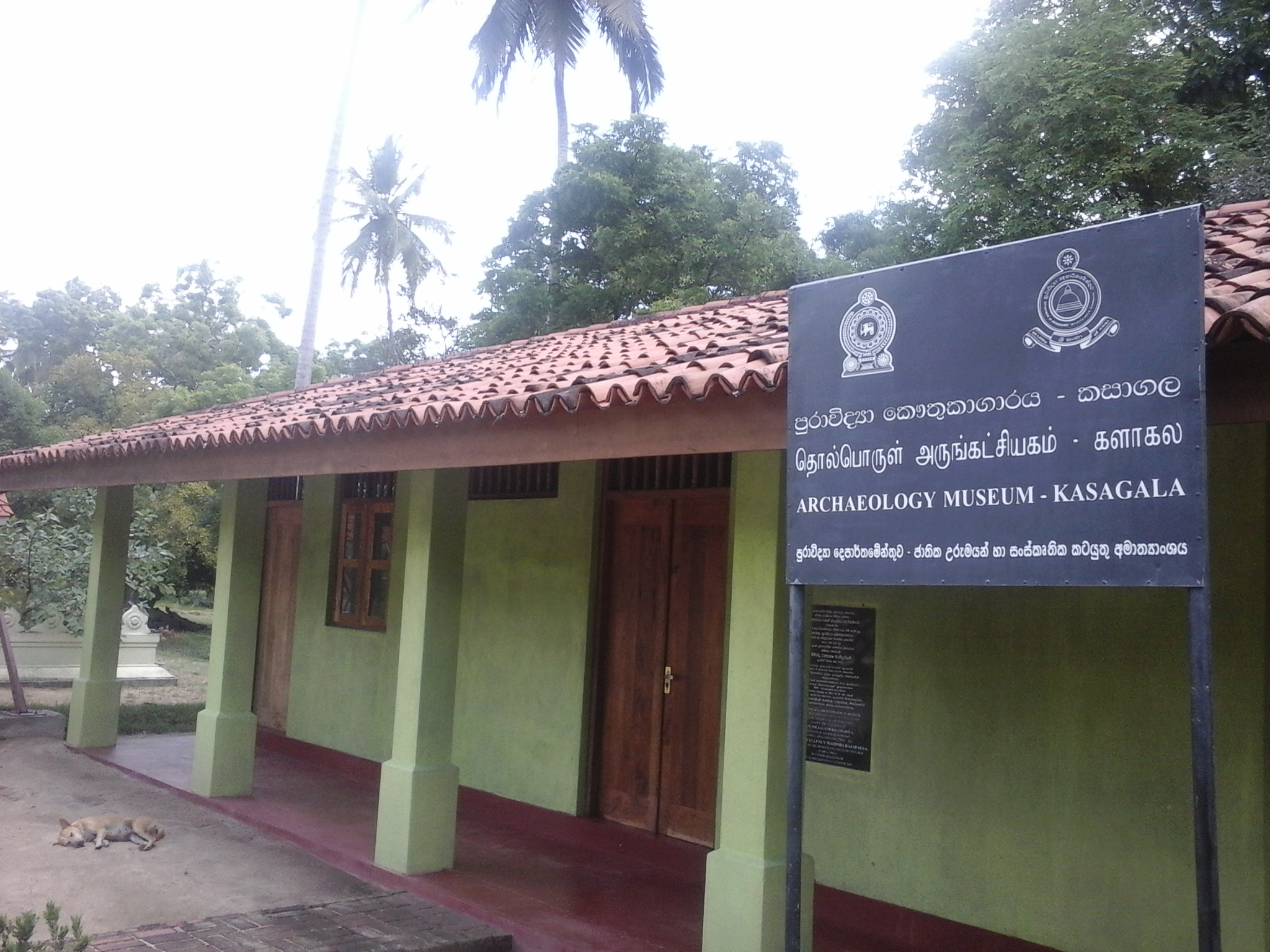
- Archaeological Museum, Kasagala
- Location: Kasagala, Sri Lanka
- Coordinates: 6°08′07.29″N 80°48′46.48″E
- Type: Archaeological
- Website: http://www.archaeology.gov.lk

Kasagala Archaeological Museum is a site museum located at Kasagala, Sri Lanka. It was maintained by Department of Archaeology of Sri Lanka. The museum is used to exhibit antiquities belonging to Kasagala and surrounding area.

== See also ==
- List of museums in Sri Lanka
