= Udo Recker =

German archaeologist and anthropologist

- Born: March 20, 1967 (age 59); Germany
- Education: University of Bonn (M.A., Ph.D.)
- Occupation: Archaeologist
- Years active: 1991–present
- Known for: Medieval and later archaeology; work in South Asian archaeology
- Notable work: Excavations at Godavaya harbour site, Sri Lanka; Medieval parish studies in western Rhineland
- Title: Director of Archaeology, State of Hesse

Udo Recker (March 20, 1967) is a German archaeologist (M.A. University of Bonn 1995, Ph.D. University of Bonn 1999). He is primarily specializing in medieval and later archaeology but has an interest in south Asian archaeology, too. He is the Director of Archaeology of the German federal state of Hesse.

== Academic career ==
In 1991 he was part of a German archaeological team under the direction of the late Prof. Dr. Klaus Kilian (1939–1992) of the German Archaeological Institute (DAI) excavating in Pidurangula, Central Province, Sri Lanka. From 1992-1993 he took part in excavations carried out in Tissamaharama, Southern Province, Sri Lanka, under the direction of Dr. Hans Joachim Weisshaar of the German Archaeological Institute (DAI). Together with the late Prof. Dr. Helmut Roth (1941–2003) of the University of Bonn he started archaeological examinations at Godavaya harbour site and in nearby Paybokka village in the Southern Province, Sri Lanka, in 1994. In 1996 Recker handed over the spade to his successor.

In 1999 Recker finished his doctoral thesis at the University of Bonn. In his thesis he examined the archaeological, architectural and material remains of a medieval parish in the western Rhineland (Lohn, Eschweiler, Northrhine-Westphalia).

In 2000 Recker was elected Assistant Director of the Archaeological Institute of the Commission for Regional Archaeology in Hesse (Kommission für Archäologische Landesforschung in Hessen = KAL). Since 2012 he has been the Acting Director of Archaeology of the German federal state of Hesse. In 2016 he was elected Director of Archaeology of the German federal state of Hesse.
