= Walawe River =

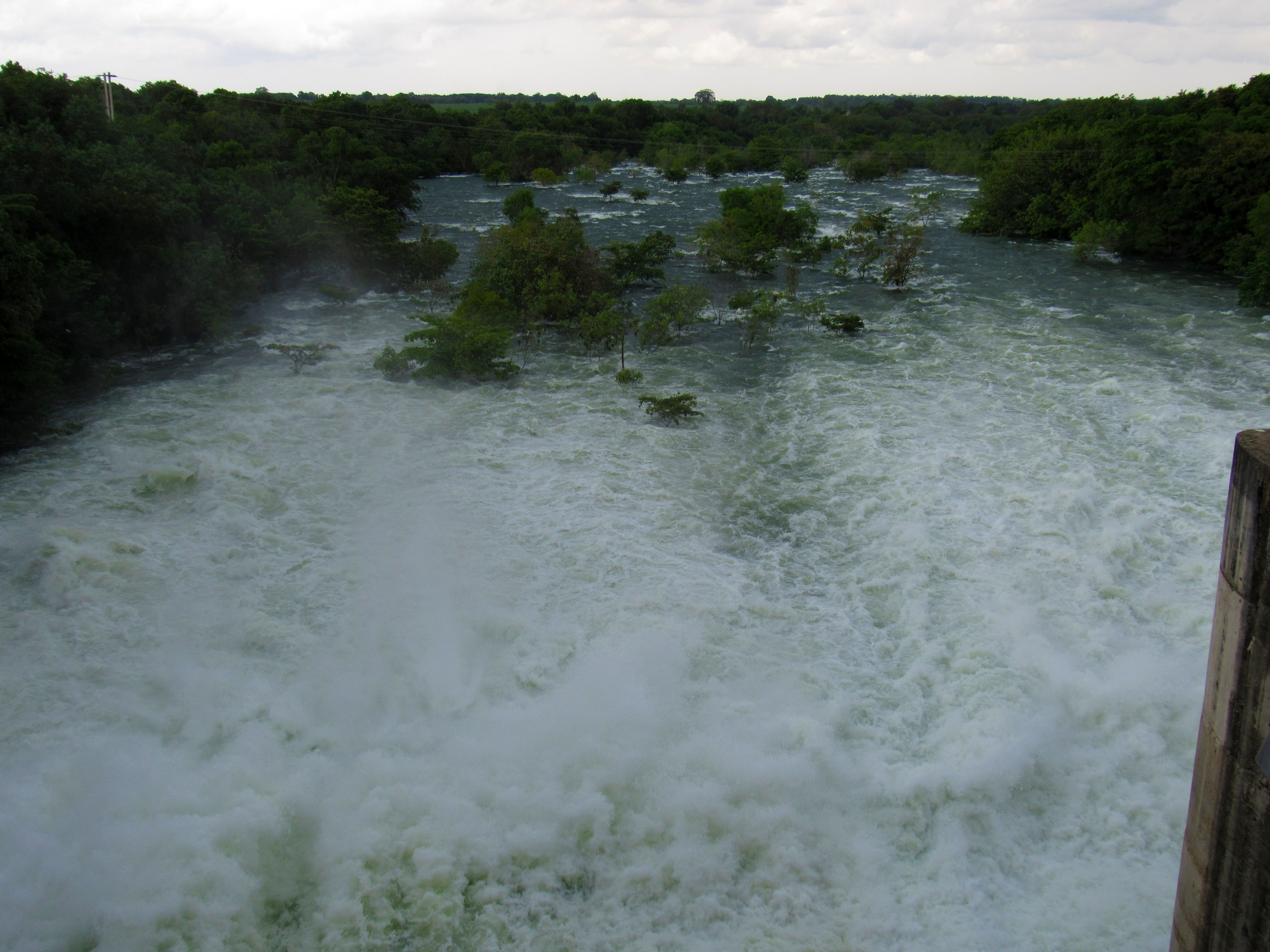
- Downstream view of the river, from the Udawalawe Dam.
- Native name: වලවේ ගඟ (Sinhala)

Location
- Country: Sri Lanka
- Locations: Padalangala, Mamadala, Nakulugamuwa, Uswewa, Angunakolapelessa, Tunkama, Ridiyagama

Physical characteristics
- Source: Sri Padaya
- Mouth: Indian Ocean
  - location: Ambalantota
  - coordinates: 06°06′19″N 81°00′57″E
- Length: 138 km (86 mi)

The Walawe (Sinhala: වලවේ ගඟ, Tamil: வளவை ஆறு) is a 138 km (86 mi) long river in Sri Lanka which originates on Adam's Peak. It discharges into the Indian Ocean at the coastal town of Ambalantota.

== Tributaries ==
- Belihul Oya
  - Kiriketi Oya

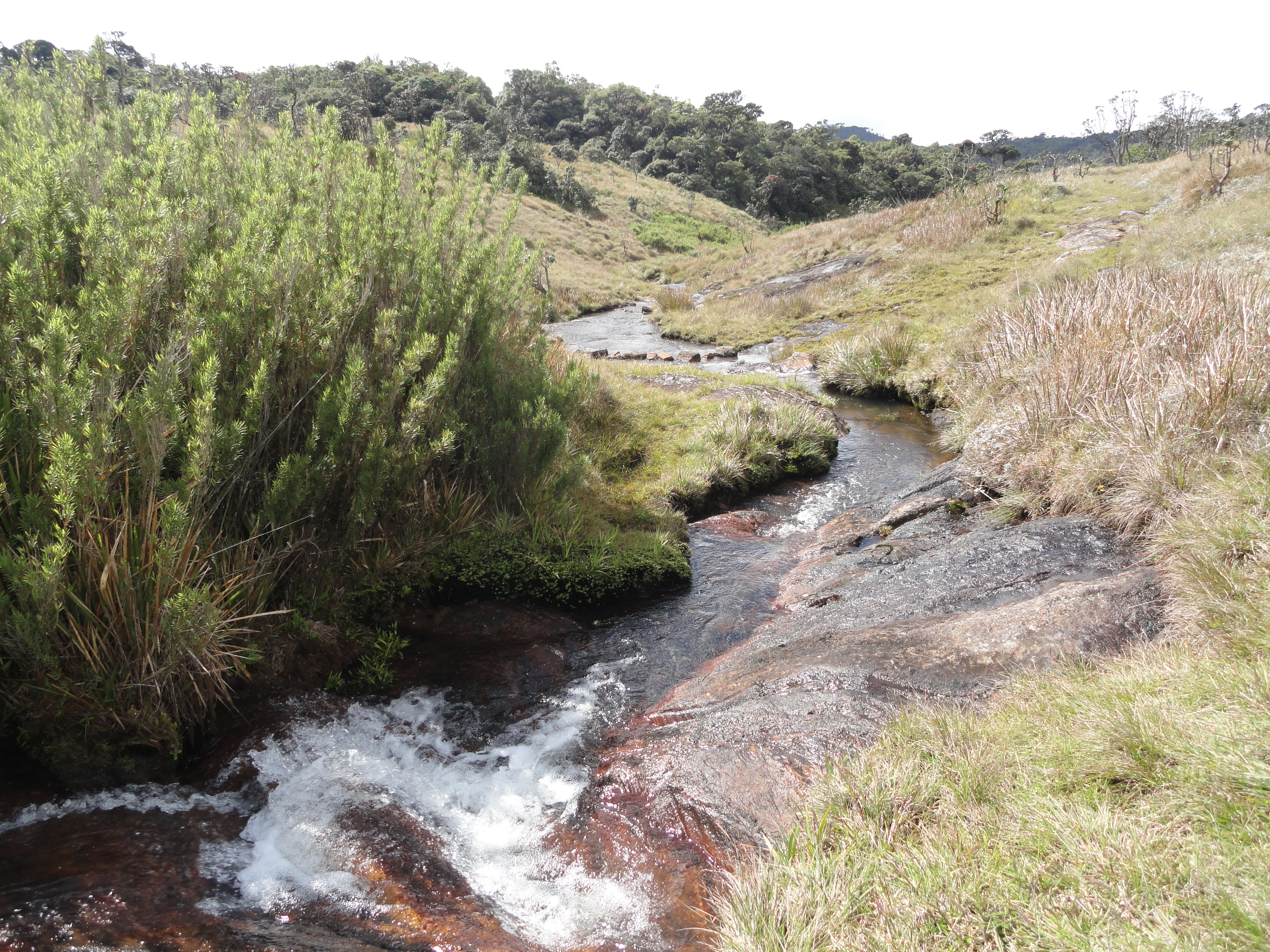
Belihul Oya, a major tributary to the Walawe River, near its source in Horton Plains.

== See also ==
- List of rivers of Sri Lanka
