= Thissamaharama Divisional Secretariat =

- Divisional Secretariat
- Country: Sri Lanka
- Province: Southern Province
- District: Hambantota District
- Time zone: UTC+5:30 (Sri Lanka Standard Time)

Thissamaharama Divisional Secretariat is a Divisional Secretariat of Hambantota District, of Southern Province, Sri Lanka.

== Demography ==
Religion in Thissamaharama DS Division (2012)
1. Buddhist (96.0%)
2. Hindu (0.40%)
3. Muslim (2.70%)
4. Roman Catholic (0.30%)
5. Other Christian (0.60%)
6. Other (0.00%)
