= Beliatta =

- Town
- Location in Sri Lanka
- Coordinates: 06°02′00″N 80°45′00″E
- Country: Sri Lanka
- Province: Southern Province
- District: Hambantota District
- Divisional Secretariat: Beliatta Divisional Secretariat
- Time zone: +5.30
- Postal code: 82400

Beliatta is a town located in the Hambantota District of Sri Lanka.

== Geography ==
It is an inland town, approximately, 7 km (4.3 mi) from the coastal town of Tangalle. Beliatta has the second highest mountain range located in the Beliatta Divisional Secretariat area (also called Raga) on the boundary of Hambantota and Matara districts. The mountain peaks are about 239 m (784 ft) high. Beliatta is fed by fountain water originating from Rilagala mountain range.

Apart from Tangalle, the nearest major towns from Beliatta are Ambalantota (37 km (23 mi)), Walasmulla (14 km (8.7 mi)) and Matara (33 km (21 mi)).

== Demographics ==
The population of Beliatta DS Division is almost entirely Sinhalese ( 99.79%-55,872 persons), while the rest are people of other nationalities (85 Sri Lankan Tamils,14 Indian Tamils,16 Muslims and 5 Burghers) .

Buddhism is the main religion(99.56%-55,746 persons). Beliatta Siri Sunanda Maha Viharaya is the main Buddhist temple.

== Economy ==
Beliatta is known for the production of coconuts, paddy, pepper and cinnamon.

== Education ==
The main educational institutions in Beliatta include Beliatta Central College, Dammapala Girls' School, Beliatta Technical college and Pagngnananda Primary School.

Beliatta Central College is the largest and best known school in Beliatta. It is located on Walasmulla road about 0.5 km (0.31 mi) from Beliatta. In 1994, the college was converted from a mixed-gender school to a boys-only school. However in 2014, the decision was reversed and the college was re-established as a mixed-gender school.

Dammapala Girls' School is located on Tangalle road in Puwakdandawa about 1.5 km (0.93 mi) from Beliatta town. The school was initially established as a mixed-gender school but was later changed to a girls-only school.

Beliatta Technical college is a tertiary institution and was one of the pioneers of the Technical College concept in Beliatta. The technical college is located on Tangalle road about 0.5 km from Beliatta town. It offers various courses and has a large number of students graduating each year.

== Transport ==
The Beliatta railway station, which opened on 8 April 2019, serves as the current southernmost terminus of the Coastal Line. The total length of the railway station is 300 m (980 ft) and consists of three platforms.

== See also ==
- Railway stations in Sri Lanka
