= Kahavanu =

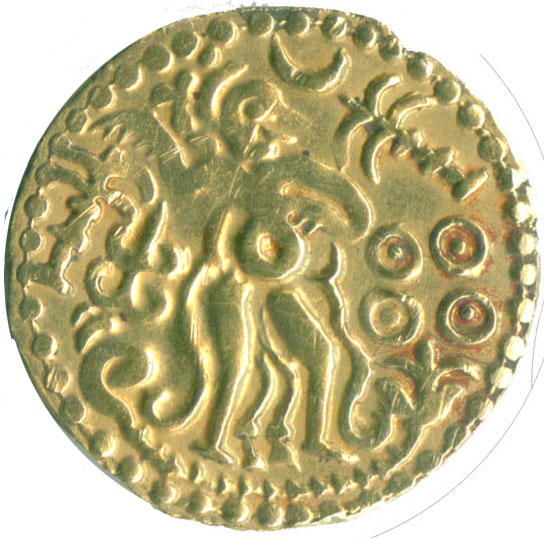
Kahavanu obverse

Kahavanu is a medieval currency from Sri Lanka. The coinage appears to have been initiated shortly before Rajaraja Chola invaded Lanka in 990 AD, and struck through the period when the Cholas dominated the island (1017-1070), and continued by closely similar coins struck for Vijayabahu (1055-1110) after he re-established Sinhala independence in 1070. Like other Lankan coins from around the 11th Century, no date is indicated. It is not certain whether the Kahavanu was introduced at Ruhuna, the region in the south of the island to which the Sinhala court had been obliged to move as a result of Rajaraja's conquests.

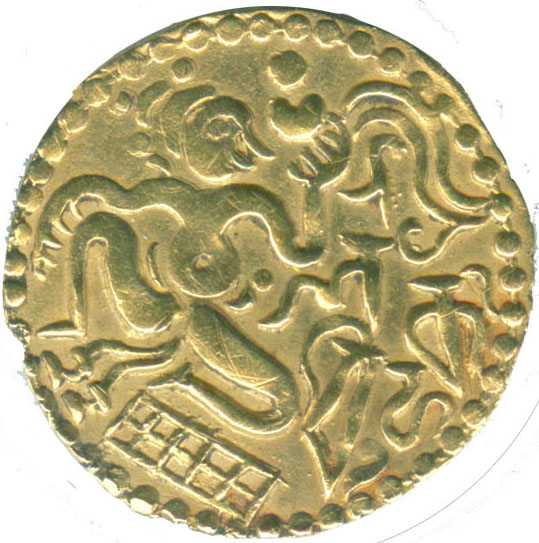
Kahavanu reverse

== Physical description ==
The diameter is 19.2 millimetres (0.76 in), the thickness is 2.8 millimetres (0.11 in), and the typical mass is 4.54 grams (0.160 oz). The design of the edge is plain, with a die axis offset of 0°.

== General description of the Lanka type gold Kahavanu ==
The obverse is a standing figure, head to the right, crowned in a dhoti (garment), indicated by the curved line on either side of, and sometimes by one or more between the legs, and standing on a lotus plant stalk with varying finials. The left arm is bent and holds a flower or other object before the face; the right arm is extended with hand over a symbol consisting of a straight shaft with short cross pieces, ending in four prongs, which are narrow and curve upward and downward. The elbow is over a similar symbol but with a plain shank and upside down. To the right is a varying number of annulets or balls. There is a beaded circle along the periphery of the coin.

The reverse is a figure, head right, crowned, squatting upon an asana (bed-like throne), represented by an oblong frame divided lengthwise by a line and crosswise by a varying number of lines; dhoti represented by one or more lines between the legs, the two ends at the waist appearing at either side of the body. The right arm is pendant over the right knee, which is drawn up; the left arm is bent and holds an object as in the obverse. Infield to right, there is a Devanagari legend in three lines: Sri Lanka Vibu. Vibhu is a title of Vishnu. There is a beaded circle along the periphery of the coin.

The three main types and subtypes as defined in Codrington are adopted in general. Types I and II are rarer and characterized by elaborate formations of the Sri, the fineness of the lettering, and the more sinuous lines of the body. In Type III with coarser figures the Sri resembles that of the Chola King Rajaraja; the letters of the legend are thicker and letters on the right slightly higher than those on the left.

== Fraudulent copies ==
In 1907 John Still puts a footnote to the word "genuine": How rare genuine specimens are I am inclined to think very few people thoroughly recognize. Gold "Lankesvaras" and "Vijaya Bahus" are turned out wholesale in Kandy now, and are so skillfully done that most of them are duly absorbed day to day into collections. The improved manufacture of late is marked"
