= Ambalantota =

Ambalantota අම්බලන්තොට அம்பலங்தொட்டை
- Town
- Location in Sri Lanka
- Coordinates: 6°07′20.9″N 81°01′25.9″E
- Country: Sri Lanka
- Province: Southern Province
- District: Hambantota District
- Time zone: +5.30

Ambalantota is a coastal town in southern Sri Lanka. It is located in Southern Province in Hambantota District between Matara and Hambantota.

The Valave River meets the sea near Ambalantota.

The Ambalantota is famous for its ancient ruins of the Kingdom of Ruhuna. After his many conquests abroad King Gajaba returned to the country from the port of Godavaya that is within sight of Ambalantota.

== History ==
Ambalantota played an important role in past Sri Lanka as the major city of the Kingdom of Ruhuna. It was called 'Manaulu Pura'. The great king Vijayaba, the great warrior Therapuththabhaya, Divisional king Mahanagha made Ambalantota flourish and Ridiyagama was the commercial hub in those days.

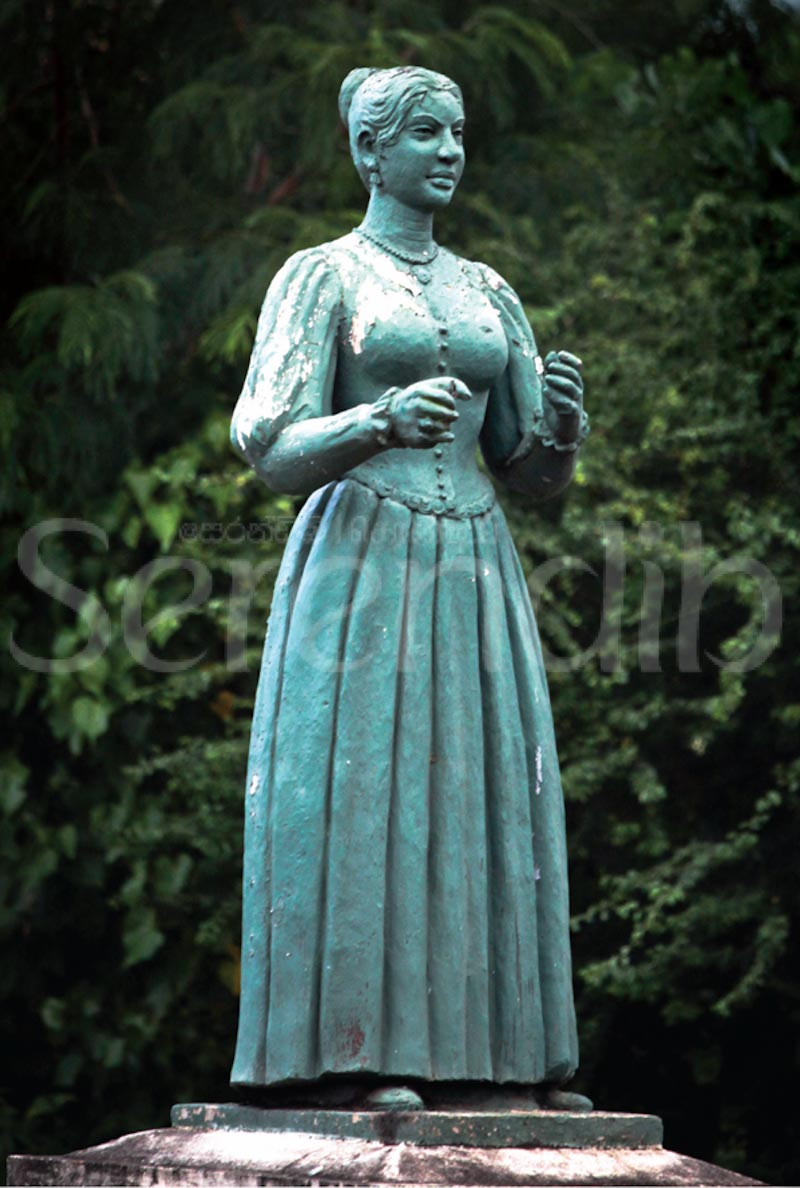
Gajaman Nona's Statue Situated at Nonagama Junction Crossing A2 Highway with A18 Highway

== Attractions ==
There are many remarkable places in Ambalantota.

- Ussangoda Beach - Nonagama
- Ochchama Beach - Nonagama
- Godawaya Beach - Godawaya (Dehigahalanda, Ambalantota)
- Godawaya ancient port - (Dehigahalanda, Ambalantota)
- Ridiyagama Lake
- Safari park - Ridiyagama
- Kalamatiya Bird Century - Hungama
- Madunagala Temple - Koggalla
- Walawe River Mouth - Ambalantota
- Mangrove forest - Ambalantota
- Karadhulena Temple - Koggalla
- Liyangastota Amuna - Barawakubuka
- Lunama kalapuwa-lunama
- Ussangoda National Park-Lunama, Nonagama
- Nonagama water park - Nonagama
- Kirala Kele Forest - Malpeththawa

== Valuable ancient temples ==
- Ramba Raja Maha Vihara
- Madhunagala Raja Maha Vihara
- Karadhulena Raja Maha Vihara
- Girihandu Raja Maha Vihara
- Wilgamvehera Raja Maha vihara
- Galvila Raja Maha vihara
- Uswella Raja Maha Vihara
- Godavaya Raja Maha vihara
- Therapuththabhaya Raja Maha viharaya
- Rangiri Raja Maha viharaya

== Transport ==
The town is served by public and private buses. The Mattala Rajapaksa International Airport (MRIA) (also known as the Hambantota International Airport) (IATA: HRI, ICAO: VCRI) is the closest international airport serving the town from nearby Hambantota.

== Education ==
Theraputtha National School is the leading and popular mixed school in Ambalantota. The other leading schools are Vijayaba Central College (mixed) - Hungama and Ambalantota Maha Vidyalaya (mixed) - Malpeththawa.

Surrounding Ambalantota, the other leading schools are Bolana Maha Vidyalaya (mixed) – Bolana and St Mary's Central College, Hambantota (mixed). The Open University of Sri Lanka has opened a Study Centre for Ambalantota in Rajasaranagama Road, Lunama South, Ambalantota which will play an important role in improving the knowledge for Hambantota students. They offer a wide variety of Higher Education programmes in Management, Language, Education, Engineering, Information Technology, Human Resource Management, etc.

== Development ==
The area is part of the southeastern region of Sri Lanka experiencing extensive investment in new infrastructure and services. The new Hambantota Port (Magampura Mahinda Rajapaksa Port) is situated near Ambalantota. A new botanical garden is also proposed for Ambalantota.

A 500-acre (2.0 km^{2}) Safari Park is being constructed in Ridiyagama, Ambalantota. The Safari Park is scheduled to open in April 2014
