= Hambantota =

Hambantota හම්බන්තොට அம்பாந்தோட்டை
- City
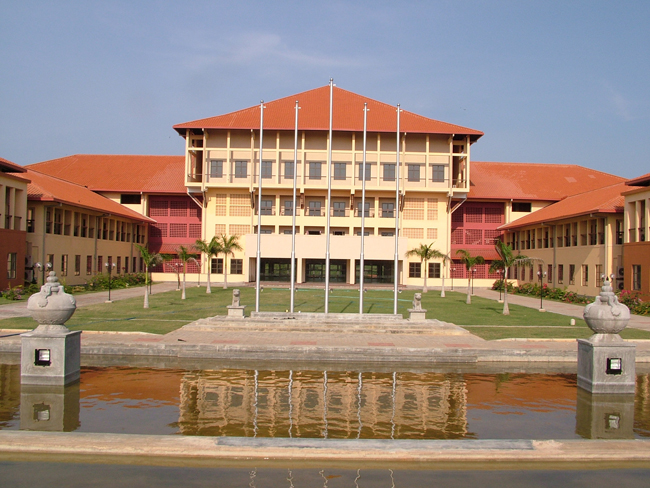
- Hambantota Administrative Complex

- Location in Sri Lanka
- Coordinates: 06°07′28″N 81°07′21″E
- Country: Sri Lanka
- Province: Southern Province
- District: Hambantota District

Government
  - Type: Municipal Council
  - Mayor: D.A. Gamini
- Elevation: 1 m (3.3 ft)

Population (2012)
  - Total: 57,264
- Time zone: +05:30
- Postal Code: 82xxx
- Area code: 047

Hambantota (Sinhala: හම්බන්තොට, Tamil: அம்பாந்தோட்டை) is the main city in Hambantota District, Southern Province, Sri Lanka.

This area was hit hard by the 2004 Indian Ocean tsunami and underwent a number of major development projects including the construction of a new sea port and international airport finished in 2013. These projects and others such as Hambantota Cricket Stadium are said to form part of the government's plan to transform Hambantota into the second major urban hub of Sri Lanka, away from Colombo.

== History ==
When the Kingdom of Ruhuna was established it received many travellers and traders from Siam, China and Indonesia who sought anchorage in the natural harbor at Godawaya, Ambalantota. The ships or large boats these traders travelled in were called "Sampans" and thota means port or anchorage so the port where sampans anchor came to be known as Sampantota. After some time the area came to be called Hambantota.

Hambantota is derived from 'Sampan Thota' – the harbour used by Malay sea going Sampans which traversed the southern seas in the 1400s well before the European colonisers arrived.

The prominent Malay community part of the population is said to be partly descended from seafarers from the Malay Archipelago who travelled through the Magampura port, and over time settled down.

The presence of a pre-existing Malay community prompted the British colonial Government to disband and settle soldiers of a Malay Regiment which had fought with the British in the Kandyan wars at Kirinda near Hambantota. After the arrival of the European colonialists, and the focus of the Galle harbour, Hambantota went into quiet decline.

=== Ancient Hambantota ===
Hambantota District is part of the traditional south known as Ruhuna. In ancient times this region, especially Hambantota and the neighboring areas was the centre of a flourishing civilization. Historical evidence reveals that the region in that era had fertile fields and a stupendous irrigation network. Hambantota was known by many names Mahagama, Ruhuna and Dolos dahas rata.

About 200 BC, the first Kingdom of Sri Lanka was flourishing in the north central region of Anuradhapura.

After a personal dispute with his brother, King Devanampiyatissa of Anuradhapura, King Mahanaga established the Kingdom of Ruhuna in the south of the island. This region played a vital role in building the nation as well as nurturing the Sri Lankan Buddhist culture. Close to Hambantota, the large temple of Tissamaharama was built to house a sacred tooth relic.

=== Modern history ===
Around the years of 1801 and 1803, the British built a Martello tower on the tip of the rocky headland alongside the lighthouse overlooking the sea at Hambantota. The builder was a Captain Goper, who built the tower on the site of an earlier Dutch earthen fort. The tower was restored in 1999, and in the past, formed part of an office of the Hambantota Kachcheri where the Land Registry branch was housed. Today it houses a fisheries museum.

From 2 August to 9 September 1803, an Ensign J. Prendergast of the regiment of Ceylon native infantry was in command of the British colony at Hambantota during a Kandian attack that he was able to repel with the assistance of the snow ship Minerva. Earlier, HMS Wilhelmina had touched there and left off eight men from the Royal Artillery to reinforce him. This detachment participated in Prendergast's successful defense of the colony. If the tower at Hambantota was at all involved in repelling any attack this would be one of the only cases in which a British Martello tower had been involved in combat.

Leonard Woolf, future husband of Virginia Woolf, was the British colonial administrator at Hambantota between 1908 and 1911.

=== 2004 Indian Ocean earthquake ===
The 2004 Indian Ocean Tsunami devastated Hambantota, and reportedly killed more than 4500 people.

== Climate ==
Hambantota features a tropical wet and dry climate (As) under the Köppen climate classification. There is no true dry season, but there is significantly less rain from January through March and again from June through August. The heaviest rain falls in October and November. The city sees on average roughly 1,050 millimetres (41 in) of precipitation annually. Average temperatures in Hambantota change little throughout the year, ranging from 26.3 °C (79.3 °F) in January to 28.1 °C (82.6 °F) in April and May.

Climate data for Hambantota (1991–2020, extremes 1869–2025)
Month	Jan	Feb	Mar	Apr	May	Jun	Jul	Aug	Sep	Oct	Nov	Dec	Year
Record high °C (°F)	34.7 (94.5)	35.1 (95.2)	36.0 (96.8)	37.5 (99.5)	36.4 (97.5)	37.2 (99.0)	36.2 (97.2)	39.2 (102.6)	37.5 (99.5)	36.9 (98.4)	36.7 (98.1)	34.8 (94.6)	39.2 (102.6)
Mean daily maximum °C (°F)	30.9 (87.6)	31.5 (88.7)	31.9 (89.4)	31.9 (89.4)	31.2 (88.2)	31.2 (88.2)	31.6 (88.9)	30.9 (87.6)	30.5 (86.9)	30.7 (87.3)	30.6 (87.1)	30.4 (86.7)	31.1 (88.0)
Daily mean °C (°F)	27.1 (80.8)	27.5 (81.5)	28.4 (83.1)	28.7 (83.7)	28.6 (83.5)	28.4 (83.1)	28.4 (83.1)	28.0 (82.4)	27.8 (82.0)	27.7 (81.9)	27.2 (81.0)	27.1 (80.8)	27.9 (82.2)
Mean daily minimum °C (°F)	23.3 (73.9)	23.6 (74.5)	24.3 (75.7)	25.3 (77.5)	26.0 (78.8)	25.6 (78.1)	25.2 (77.4)	25.0 (77.0)	24.9 (76.8)	24.6 (76.3)	24.1 (75.4)	23.7 (74.7)	24.6 (76.3)
Record low °C (°F)	17.7 (63.9)	15.6 (60.1)	17.4 (63.3)	18.9 (66.0)	19.5 (67.1)	21.2 (70.2)	21.2 (70.2)	20.1 (68.2)	20.6 (69.1)	20.2 (68.4)	19.6 (67.3)	18.2 (64.8)	15.6 (60.1)
Average precipitation mm (inches)	68.4 (2.69)	47.4 (1.87)	47.0 (1.85)	92.3 (3.63)	73.1 (2.88)	41.2 (1.62)	30.8 (1.21)	59.4 (2.34)	100.0 (3.94)	128.5 (5.06)	221.8 (8.73)	132.1 (5.20)	1,041.7 (41.01)
Average precipitation days (≥ 1.0 mm)	5.3	4.0	4.0	6.8	6.9	5.6	4.3	6.3	8.3	10.1	13.0	9.4	84.2
Average relative humidity (%)	77	78	78	80	81	80	78	79	80	80	82	81	79
Mean monthly sunshine hours	207.7	200.6	248.0	237.0	235.6	201.0	204.6	201.5	207.0	192.2	189.0	217.0	2,541.2
Mean daily sunshine hours	6.7	7.1	8.0	7.9	7.6	6.7	6.6	6.5	6.9	6.2	6.3	7.0	7.0
Source 1: NOAA
Source 2: Deutscher Wetterdienst (humidity, 1950-1994 and sun, 1962–1977), Meteo Climat (record highs and lows)

== Demographics ==
Hambantota Town is Buddhist majority. Islam is the second largest religion in the town. There are also small numbers of Christians and Hindus. Sinhalese people form the majority of the town's population followed by Sri Lankan Malays who make up 30% of the total population.

Religion in Hambantota
1. Buddhist (81.8%)
2. Muslim (16.4%)
3. Hindu (0.76%)
4. Roman Catholic (0.52%)
5. Other Christian (0.44%)
6. Other (0.13%)

== Economy and infrastructure ==
A cement grinding and bagging factory is being set up, as well as fertiliser bagging plants. Large salt plains are a prominent feature of Hambantota. The town is a major producer of salt. A Special Economic Zone of 6,100 hectares (15,000 acres) has been proposed by Prime Minister Ranil Wickremesinghe, out of which approximately 500 hectares (1,235 acres) will be situated in Hambantota to build factories, LNG plants and refineries while the rest will be in Monaragala, Embilipitiya and Matara. A Vocational training Center was opened in 2017 by Prime minister Ranil Wickremesinghe with China to train the workforce needed for the SEZs. Wickramasinghe also came into an agreement with state-owned China Merchants Port Holdings to lease 70 percent stake of the strategically-located Hambantota port at $1.12 billion, opening Hambantota to the Belt and Road Initiative.

=== Transportation ===
==== Air ====
Mattala Rajapaksa International Airport (MRIA), is located in Mattala, a town 18 km (11 mi) north of Hambantota. The airport was officially opened in March 2013, and is the second international airport in Sri Lanka after Bandaranaike International Airport in Colombo. The Weerawila Airport is also located nearby.

==== Road ====
A2 highway connects Colombo with Hambantota town through Galle and Matara. The Southern Expressway from Kottawa to Matara will be connected to Hambantota via Beliatta.

==== Rail ====
Construction work started in 2006 on the Matara-Kataragama Railway Line project, a broad gauge railway being implemented at an estimated cost of $91 million.

=== Energy ===
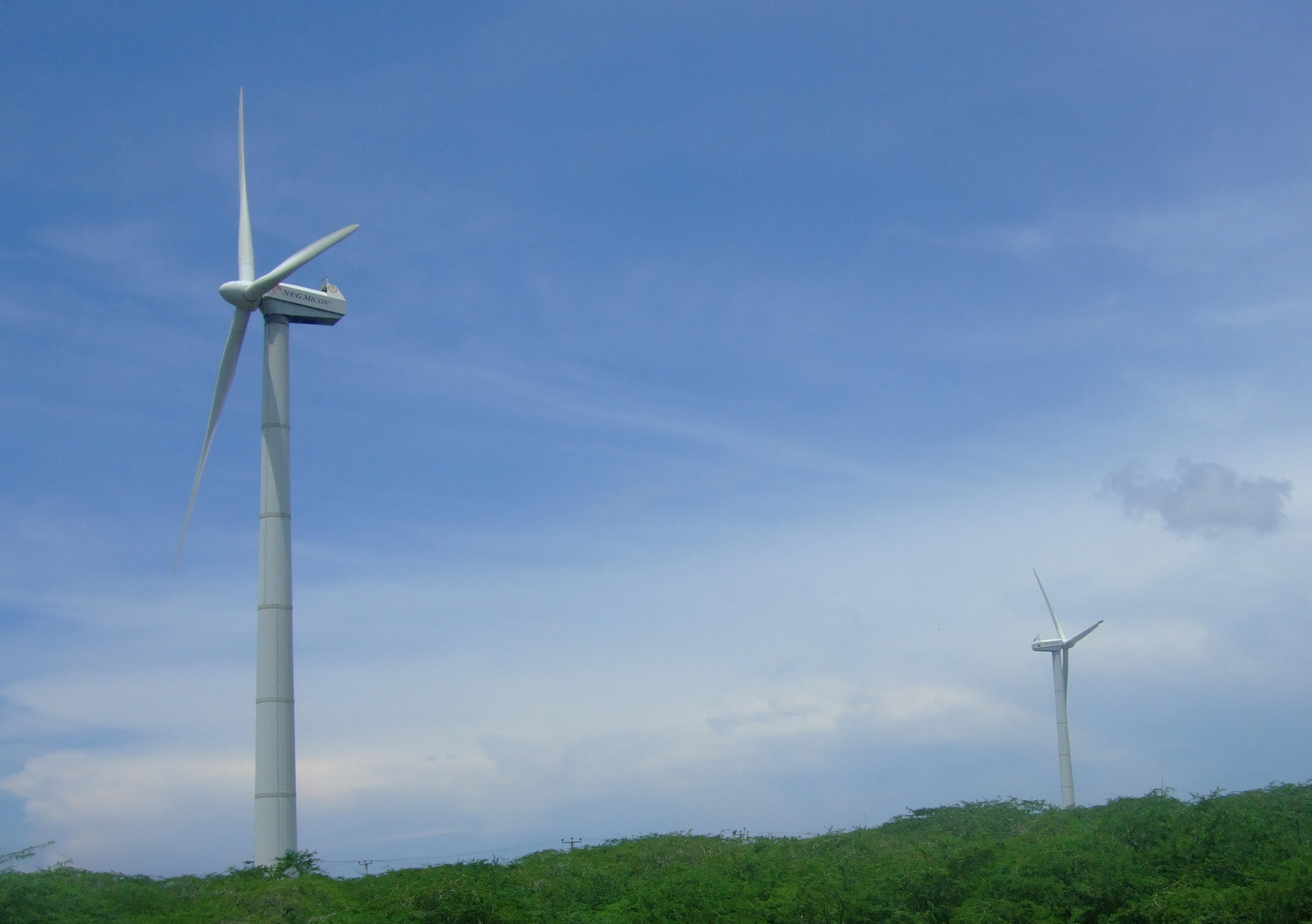
NEG Micon M1500-600 wind turbines in Hambanthota Wind Farm

The Hambantota Wind Farm is the first wind farm in Sri Lanka (there are two more commercial wind farms). It's a pilot project to test wind power generation in the island nation. Wind energy development faces immense obstacles such as poor roads and an unstable power grid. With the transmission network development plan of CEB, first ever 220kV grid substation is under construction in Hambantota, it will be connected to the National Grid by 2022. CHINT Electric is the Main Contractor and Minel Lanka is the National Contractor that carried out design, civil construction and electrical installation works. This substation will be handling 500 MVA with 6 units of 220/132/33 kV 83.33 MVA power transformers from Tirathai.

=== Port ===
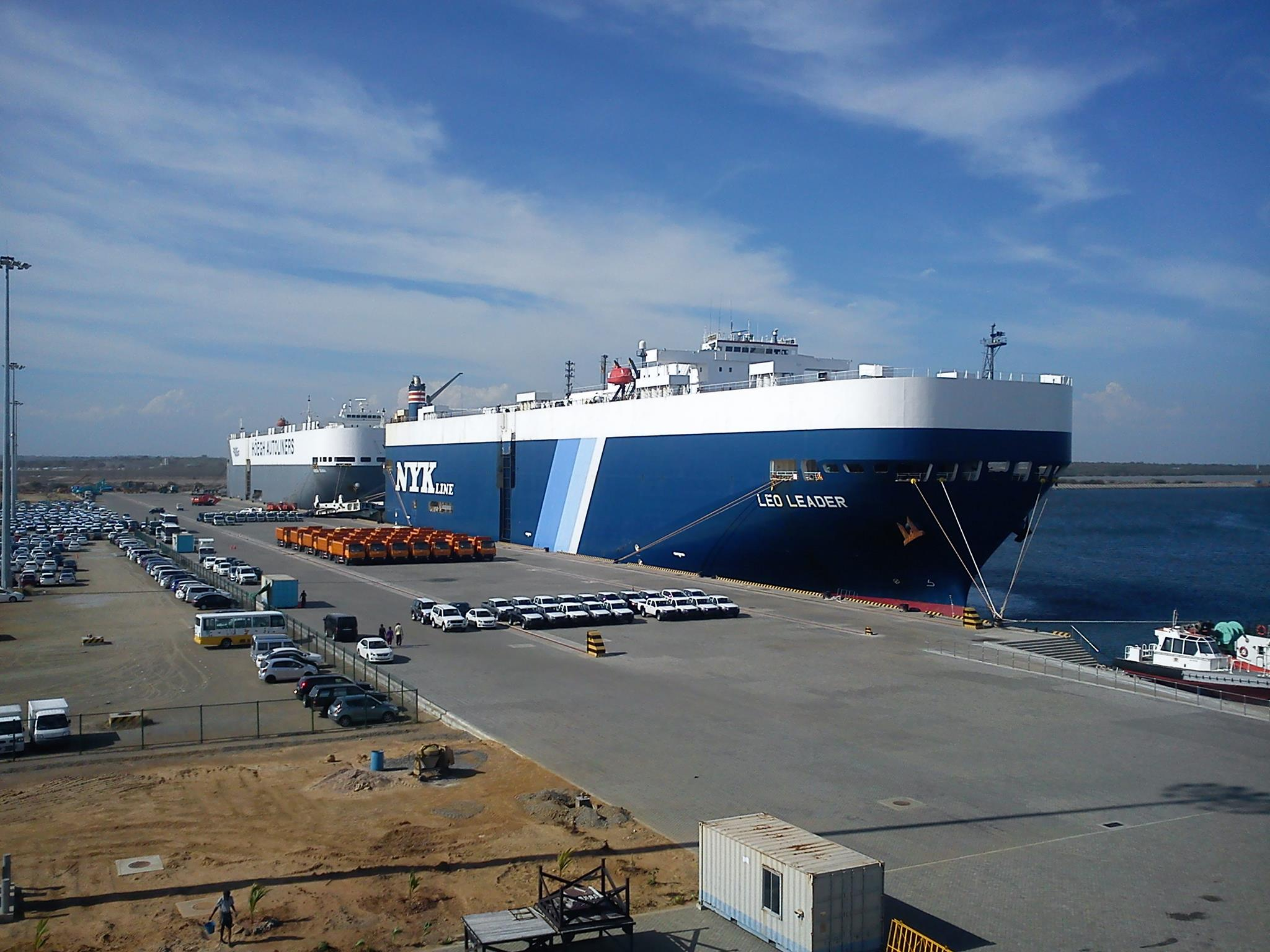
Hambantota Port

Hambantota is the selected site for a new international port, the Port of Hambantota. It was scheduled to be built in three phases, with the first phase due to be completed by the end of 2010 at a cost of $360 million. As part of the port, a $550 million tax-free port zone is being started, with companies in India, China, Russia and Dubai expressing interest in setting up shipbuilding, ship-repair and warehousing facilities in the zone. The port officially opened on November 18, 2010, at the end of the first phase of construction. When all phases are fully complete, it will be able to berth 33 vessels, which would make it the biggest port in South Asia.

Bunkering facility: 14 tanks (8 for oil, 3 for aviation fuel and 3 for LP gas) with a total capacity of 80,000 m^{3} (2,800,000 cu ft). But in the whole of 2012 only 34 ships berthed at Hambantota, compared with 3,667 ships at the port of Colombo. Sri Lanka was still heavily in debt to China for the cost of the port and with so little traffic, was unable to service the debt. In 2017 China was given a 99-year lease for the port in exchange for $1.1 billion.

The involvement of Chinese companies in the development of Hambantota port have provoked claims by some analysts that it is part of China's String of Pearls strategy. Other analysts have argued that it would not be in Sri Lanka's interests to allow the Chinese navy access to the port and in any event the exposed nature of the port would make it of dubious value to China in time of conflict.

In November 2019, President Gotabaya Rajapaksa indicated that the Sri Lankan government would try to undo the 99-year lease of the port and return to the original loan repayment schedule. As of August 2020 the 99-year lease was still in place.

== Culture ==
Hambantota contains the Mahinda Rajapaksa International Stadium for sports activities. It has a capacity of 35,000 seats and was built for the 2011 Cricket World Cup. The cost of this project is an estimated Rs. 900 million (US$7.86m). Sri Lanka Cricket is seeking relief from its debts incurred in building infrastructure for the 2011 Cricket World Cup.

Magam Ruhunupura International Conference Hall (MRICH) was built for local and international events. The MRICH, situated in a 28-acre plot of land in Siribopura, is Sri Lanka's second international conference hall. The main hall has 1,500 seats and there are three additional halls with a seating capacity of 250 each. The conference hall is fully equipped with modern technical facilities and a vehicle park for 400 vehicles and a helipad for helicopter landing.

On 31 March 2010, a surprise bid was made for the 2018 Commonwealth Games by Hambantota. Hambantota is undergoing a major face lift since the tsunami. On 10 November 2011, the Hambantota bidders claimed they had already secured enough votes to win the hosting rights. However, on 11 November it was officially announced that Australia's Gold Coast had won the rights to host the games.

== Twin cities ==
Hambantota is twinned with Guangzhou, China, since 2007.

== See also ==
- List of cities in Sri Lanka
- Municipal councils of Sri Lanka
