= Hambantota District =

- District
- Map of Sri Lanka with Hambantota District highlighted
- Coordinates: 6°15′N 81°10′E
- Country: Sri Lanka
- Province: Southern Province
- Largest Town: Hambantota
- Divisions: List: Divisional Secretariats: 12; Grama Niladhari: 576

Government
  - District Secretary: W. H. Karunarathne
  - Local: List: Municipal Councils: 1; Urban Councils: 1; Pradeishiya Sabhas: 10

Area
  - Total: 2,609 km^{2} (1,007 sq mi)
  - Land: 2,496 km^{2} (964 sq mi)
  - Water: 113 km^{2} (44 sq mi)

Population (2011)
  - Total: 596,617
  - Density: 239.0/km^{2} (619.1/sq mi)
- Time zone: UTC+05:30 (Sri Lanka)
- ISO 3166 code: LK-33
- Website: hambantota.dist.gov.lk/

Hambantota District (Sinhala: හම්බන්තොට දිස්ත්‍රික්කය hambantoṭa distrikkaya; Tamil: அம்பாந்தோட்டை மாவட்டம் Ampāntōṭṭai māvaṭṭam) is a district in Southern Province, Sri Lanka. It is one of 25 districts of Sri Lanka, the second level administrative division of the country. The district is administered by a District Secretariat headed by a District Secretary (previously known as a Government Agent) appointed by the central government of Sri Lanka.

Hambantota District is located on the southeastern coast of Sri Lanka. It has an area of 2,593 km^{2} (1,001 sq mi) and a very dry climate. The district capital is Hambantota town; the administrative headquarters are there as well as the center of salt production. Other prominent towns include Tangalle, Ambalantota, Sooriyawewa, Tissamaharama, and Beliatta.

== History ==
Before modern development took place after the country gained independence in 1948, the agriculture in the district was characterised by swidden cultivation (chena or slash-and-burn) and, to some extent, paddy cultivation on non-irrigated land. In the highlands, kurakkan — a grain used to make an eatable paste — was cultivated with other grains such as corn. Leonard Woolf's Village in the Jungle provides a highly interesting and insightful account of the people, the land and issues of concern during the British Colonial period as he worked as an assistant government agent for Hambantota.

The area has traditionally been home to Sinhalese and Sri Lankan Malay people, who collectively make up 98% of the district's population. The long history of Malay settlement in the district has impacted the local culture of Hambantota, with Sri Lankan Malay being a shared language between the Sri Lankan Malays and some members of the Sinhalese community.

== Demographics ==
Ethnic groups
| Sinhalese | 579,032 | (97.04%) |
| Sri Lankan Malay | 8,310 | (1.39%) |
| Sri Lankan Moor | 6,556 | (1.1%) |
| Indian Tamil | 136 | (0.02%) |
| Burgher | 138 | (0.02%) |
| Sri Lankan Tamil | 2,111 | (0.35%) |
| Other | 434 | (0.07%) |

Religions
| Buddhism | 577,284 | (96.76%) |
| Hinduism | 1,243 | (0.21%) |
| Islam | 15,163 | (2.54%) |
| Roman Catholic | 1,098 | (0.18%) |
| Other Christian | 1,511 | (0.25%) |
| Other | 318 | (0.05%) |

Ethnicity in Hambantota District (2024)
1. Sinhala (97.0%)
2. Sri Lankan Moors (2.06%)
3. Others (0.94%)

Religion in Hambantota district (2024)
| Religion | Percent |
| Buddhism | 96.77% |
| Islam | 2.67% |
| Other or not stated | 0.56% |

Hambantota District has a population of 596,617 (2011) of whom 96% are considered rural residents. Some 13.4% of the labor force of 244,847 is unemployed — in comparison to the national average of 8.3%. Of those employed, 42.2% are in the agricultural sector, 23.3% in industry with the remaining 34.5% working in the services sector.

== Politics and government ==
=== Local government ===
Hambantota District has 12 local authorities of which one is a Municipal Council, one is an Urban Council and the remaining 10 are Divisional Councils (Pradeshiya Sabha).

| Local Authority | Registered Electors (2025) | Elected Members (2025) | | | | | | | |
| Local Authority | Registered Electors (2025) | NPP | SJB | SLPP | PA | SB | UNP | Other | Total |
|---|---|---|---|---|---|---|---|---|---|
| Ambalantota Pradeshiya Sabha | 62,779 | 17 | 5 | 5 | 3 | 0 | 1 | 0 | 31 |
| Angunakolapellessa Pradeshiya Sabha | 43,114 | 11 | 3 | 3 | 2 | 1 | 0 | 0 | 20 |
| Beliatte Pradeshiya Sabha | 49,272 | 15 | 7 | 4 | 2 | 0 | 0 | 0 | 29 |
| Hambantota Municipal Council | 18,759 | 8 | 7 | 2 | 3 | 1 | 0 | 0 | 21 |
| Hambantota Pradeshiya Sabha | 30,055 | 8 | 4 | 2 | 0 | 1 | 0 | 0 | 15 |
| Katuwana Pradeshiya Sabha | 60,805 | 16 | 6 | 5 | 2 | 2 | 1 | 1 | 33 |
| Lunugamvehera Pradeshiya Sabha | 28,050 | 9 | 5 | 2 | 1 | 1 | 0 | 0 | 18 |
| Suriyawewa Pradeshiya Sabha | 38,355 | 6 | 2 | 2 | 1 | 0 | 0 | 0 | 11 |
| Tangalle Pradeshiya Sabha | 55,492 | 15 | 5 | 4 | 1 | 1 | 1 | 0 | 27 |
| Tangalle Urban Council | 7,105 | 9 | 5 | 3 | 0 | 1 | 1 | 0 | 19 |
| Tissamaharama Pradeshiya Sabha | 59,873 | 13 | 4 | 3 | 1 | 1 | 0 | 0 | 22 |
| Weeraketiya Pradeshiya Sabha | 72,940 | 19 | 6 | 6 | 3 | 1 | 1 | 2 | 38 |
| Total | 526,599 | 146 | 55 | 45 | 19 | 11 | 5 | 3 | 284 |

== Towns ==
- Hambantota (Municipal Council)
- Tangalle (Urban Council)
- Ambalantota
- Suriyawewa
- Beliatta
- Tissamaharama
- Middeniya
- Angunukolapelessa
- Walasmulla
- Weeraketiya
