= Chunnakam Power Station =

Thermal power station in Sri Lanka

- Country: Sri Lanka
- Location: Chunnakam
- Coordinates: 9°44′30″N 80°02′03″E
- Status: Decommissioned
- Commission date: 1958
- Decommission date: 2013
- Owner: CEB

Thermal power station
- Primary fuel: Diesel fuel

Power generation
- Units decommissioned: 4 × 1 MW; 5 × 2 MW
- Nameplate capacity: 14 MW
- Annual net output: 0.3 GWh (2013); 10 GWh (2008); 5.16 GWh (2012); 6.62 GWh (2011)

Chunnakam Power Station was a thermal power station in Chunnakam in northern Sri Lanka. Commissioned in 1958, the station is owned and operated by the state-owned Ceylon Electricity Board (CEB). It was decommissioned in 2013, and replaced by the Uthuru Janani Power Station, which is constructed less than 100m south of the Chunnakam Power Station.

== History ==
=== Early history ===
In 1947 the Department of Industries in Ceylon agreed to meet the electricity demand of the Jaffna Peninsula, which at that time stood at only 370 kW, from the power station at Kankesanthurai cement factory. From 1950 the peninsula was supplied by an isolated Medium Voltage (MV) power transmission network operated by the Department of Government Electrical Undertakings. At the time Jaffna was the only major town on the peninsula with electricity supply. Demand for electricity in the peninsula grew as other towns were connected to the electricity network and with increasing demand from industries, such as Kankesanthurai cement factory, and from agriculture. By the mid-1950s demand on the peninsula stood at 1,500 kW and was expected to increase to 2,000 kW. Jaffna peninsula was not connected to the national grid and as such could not benefit from Ceylon's growing hydroelectric generation.

To meet the increased demand, a power station was established in Chunnakam in 1958 to supply the local MV network. The station consisted of four Deutz (Note: Another source states that the four initial 1MW sets were from Mirlees.) diesel generator sets, each capable of generating 1 MW. The station's generating capacity increased from 4 MW to 14 MW (Note: Other sources show capacity increasing over time from 4MW to 8MW, then 10MW and finally 14MW.) in 1965 with the addition of five Mirlees diesel generator sets, each capable of generating 2 MW, some of which were transferred from Pettah Power Station.

The Jaffna MV local network was connected to the national grid in 1973 via a 132 kV double-circuit transmission line from Anuradhapura to Chunnakam. Jaffna peninsula started receiving electricity from Laxapana Power Station.

=== Civil war ===
Electricity supply, like much of the infrastructure in northern Sri Lanka, was affected by the Sri Lankan Civil War. Jaffna peninsula's connection to the national grid was broken in 1990 (Note: Other sources claim that Jaffna peninsula's connection to the national grid was cut-off by the LTTE in 1987 during Operation Pawan.) and the peninsula once again became reliant on Chunnakam Power Station for its electricity needs. On 9 August 1990, as the Sri Lankan military tried to regain control of the peninsula from the militant Liberation Tigers of Tamil Eelam (LTTE) following the withdrawal of the Indian Peace Keeping Force, the Sri Lanka Air Force bombed the power station twice, setting two diesel storage tanks on fire. Electricity supply on the peninsula, which was already limited to one hour a day, ceased completely.

The Sri Lankan military re-captured much of the Jaffna peninsula, which had been under LTTE control since 1990, in 1995/96 and took over Chunnakam Power Station. The old power station was unable to meet the electricity demands on the peninsula, resulting in numerous power cuts in the late 1990s/early 2000s. By 2006 the station was only capable of generating 8 MW (two sets of 1 MW and three sets of 2 MW). Consequently, two Independent Power Producers (IPP) were invited to generate electricity in the peninsula on a temporary basis. Aggreko (15 MW) operated from Chunnakam whilst Koolair (13 MW) operated from Kankesanthurai. The prices the two IPPs charged for supplying electricity to the CEB network was higher than other electricity generators. As a result, the government decided in 2006 to cease buying electricity from the two IPPs from 2007 and instead build a Northern Power Station at Chunnakam. Endemic corruption within CEB allowed Northern Power to use 30 year old generators which resulted them charging high prices for supplying electricity to the CEB network. Northern Power also failed to deliver the 30 MW they had agreed to which meant that Aggreko had to be kept open to meet demand (Koolair had been shut down in 2009). Aggreko's contract was eventually terminated on 31 December 2012.

=== Post civil war ===
Following the end of the civil war in 2009 the Sri Lankan government started re-building the electricity infrastructure in northern Sri Lanka. A 73 km 132 kV double circuit transmission line from Vavuniya to Kilinochchi and a new 63MVA 132/33 kV grid substation in Kilinochchi were built, financed largely by a loan from the Japan International Cooperation Agency. The Vavuniya-Kilinochchi transmission line was completed in August 2012. The new Kilinochchi grid substation was opened on 25 September 2012, re-connecting Jaffna peninsula to the national grid. A 67 km 132 kV double circuit transmission line from Kilinochchi to Chunnakam and a new 63MVA 132/33 kV grid substation in Chunnakam were built, financed largely by a loan from the Asian Development Bank/Federal Ministry of Economic Cooperation and Development (BMZ). The Kilinochchi-Chunnakam transmission line was completed in August 2013. The new Chunnakam grid substation was opened on 13 September 2013.

Plans were also drawn up, under the Northern Generation (Uthuru Janani) program, to replace the ageing plant at Chunnakam Power Station with a new plant consisting of three 8 MW generators powered by heavy fuel oil 1500. The contract for the construction of the new plant was awarded to Lakdhanavi, a subsidiary of CEB. Lakdhanavi imported three 8.6 MW generators for the project. Construction of the Rs.3.5 billion plant began in April 2012 and was completed in January 2013. The new plant, called the Uthuru Janani Power Station, was officially opened on 12 February 2013.

== Electricity generation ==
Old Chunnakam
Year	Capacity (MW)	Electricity generated (GWh)	
Year	Capacity (MW)	Target	Actual
2008	8		10.00
2011	8	3.05	6.62
2012	8	11.09	5.16
2013	8	5.90	0.30

New Chunnakam
Year	Capacity (MW)	Electricity generated (GWh)	
Year	Capacity (MW)	Target	Actual
2013	24	178.90	125.30
2014	24	170.00	96.00
