= Sri Lanka Customs =

Law enforcement and authority agency of Sri Lanka

Sri Lanka Customs ශ්‍රි ලංකා රේගුව இலங்கை சுங்கச் சாவடி
- Sri Lanka Customs logo

- Flag

Agency overview
- Formed: June 1806; 220 years ago
- Employees: 2339 (2022)
- Annual budget: LKR 457 Billion (2023, estimate)

Jurisdictional structure
- Operations jurisdiction: Sri Lanka
- Constituting instrument: Customs Ordinance, No. 17 of 1869
- Specialist jurisdiction: Customs, excise, gambling

Operational structure
- Headquarters: 40 Main Street, Colombo 11
- Agency executive: Mr. P.B.S.C. Nonis, Director General
- Parent agency: Ministry of Finance

Website
- customs.gov.lk

Sri Lanka Customs (Sinhala: ශ්‍රී ලංකා රේගුව, romanized: Shri Lanka Reguwa, Tamil: இலங்கை சுங்கச் சாவடி) is a ministerial government department in Sri Lanka. The main functions of the department are,

- Collection of revenue
- Prevention of revenue leakages and other frauds
- Facilitation of legitimate trade
- Collection of import and export data to provide statistics.
- Cooperation and coordination with other Government Departments and stakeholders in respect of imports and exports.

The executive responsible is the director general, currently Mr. P.B.S.C. Nonis, appointed in 2022.

Formally known as HM Customs from 1947 to 1972, the department can trace its roots to 1806. Formally, the agency as it exists today was formed under the Customs Ordinance No. 17 of 1869, to which 51 amendments have been made to date. Being a center for trade in the Indian Ocean since antiquity, however, the history of collection of customs duties in Sri Lanka dates far back as the second century BC.

"According to the inscription of King Gajaba I (112-134 A.D.) the customs duty collected from the Godapavata Harbour had been donated to the Godapavata monastery. This is the only written evidence so far discovered to say that there had been a harbour in situ. With the discovery of Roman and other foreign coins from the archaeological excavations done at the site, this can be identified as an ancient trade centre of some importance. The remains that can be identified from the Godapavata monastery are the pillars, pillar foundations and brick monuments. From the inscriptions and other architectural remains it can be assumed that this monastery received support from the kings".

The department works with the powers vested under the Customs Ordinance, as well as through several other related enactments. As such, it has vested with the powers, such as in the areas of the arrest and detention of suspects contravening customs and import/export laws, as well as the confiscation of contraband.

The director general has direct control of all the directorates, and, among them, five are under his personal supervision. The rest of the 25 directorates are headed by directors under the supervision of five additional directors general (ADGC) and chief financial officer (CFO). Among the five additional directors general, four are the most senior customs officers. The other ADGC is appointed from the Administrative Service of Sri Lanka.

== See also ==
- Colombo Harbour
- Economy of Sri Lanka
- List of airports in Sri Lanka
- List of ports in Sri Lanka
