= List of ports in Sri Lanka =

The following is a list of ports in Sri Lanka. All ports and harbours in Sri Lanka are maintained and governed by the Government of Sri Lanka and the Sri Lanka Ports Authority.

== List of ports ==
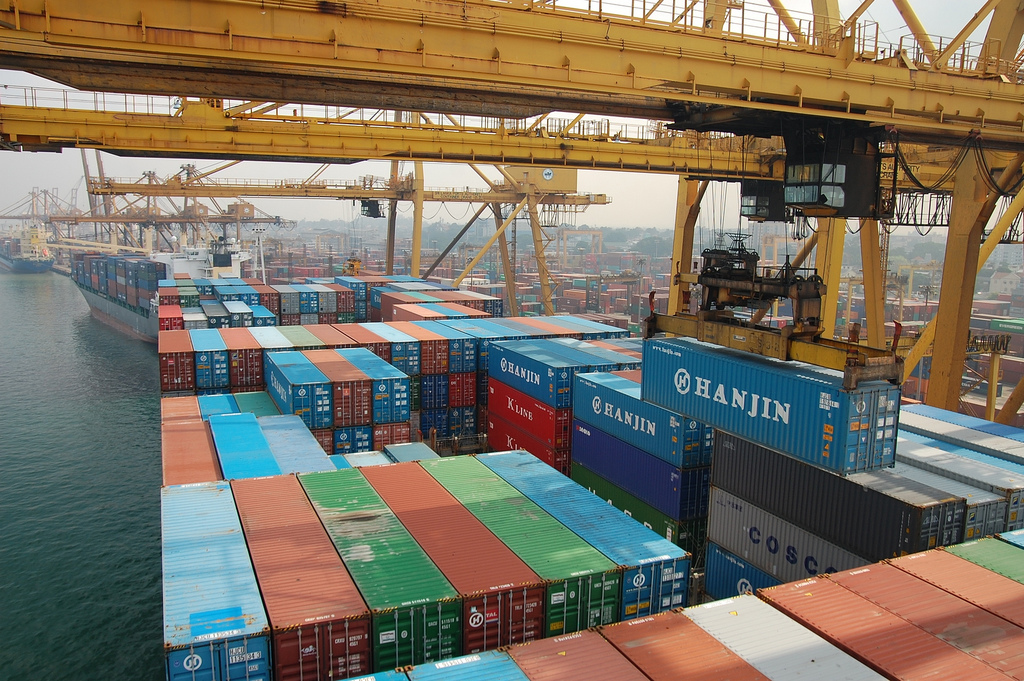
Containers and gantries at the Port of Colombo.

Name	City	Location	Description
Port of Colombo	Colombo	06°57′10″N 79°50′41″E	Largest port in the country
Port of Hambantota	Hambantota	06°07′10″N 81°06′29″E	New port in the south
Trincomalee Harbour	Trincomalee	08°34′01″N 81°13′52″E	Fourth largest natural harbour in the world
Port of Galle	Galle		Regional Port
Port of Point Pedro	Point Pedro	09°50′09″N 80°12′41″E	Minor harbour, the northernmost in the country
Kankesanthurai Harbour	Kankesanthurai	09°49′08″N 80°01′57″E	Minor harbour, currently used by the navy
Oluvil Harbour	Oluvil	07°16′30″N 81°52′00″E	Newly developed harbour opened 2013
Kalpitiya Port Of Norochcholai	Norochcholai	08°01′50″N 79°42′07″E	Used for Coal Transportation
