= Hambantota International Port =

Port in Sri Lanka

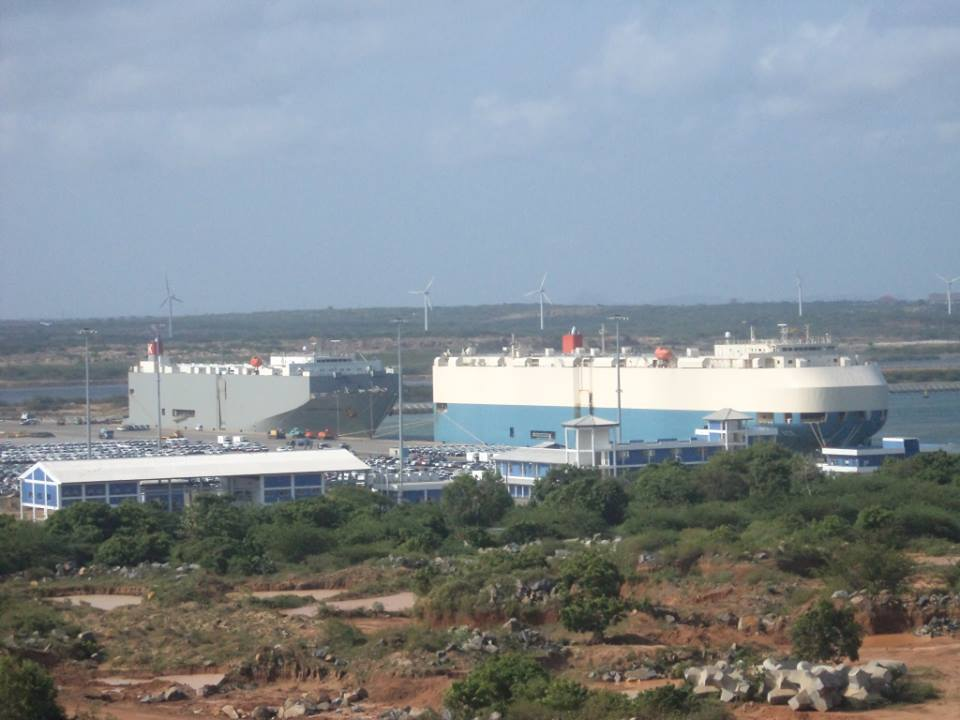
- The port in 2013
- Interactive map of Hambantota International Port
- Location within Sri Lanka

Location
- Country: Sri Lanka
- Location: Hambantota
- Coordinates: 06°07′10″N 81°06′29″E
- UN/LOCODE: LKHBA

Details
- Opened: November 18, 2010; 15 years ago
- Operated by: China Merchants Port, Sri Lanka Port Authority
- No. of berths: 3
- Draft depth: 17.0 m.
- IATA: HBT

Statistics
- Website www.slpa.lk

The Hambantota International Port (Note: Former names: Magampura Mahinda Rajapaksa Port and Magam Ruhunupura Mahinda Rajapaksa Port.) is a deep water port in Hambantota, Sri Lanka, notable for its 99-year lease to China Merchant Ports. Opened in 2010, it is Sri Lanka's second largest port, after Colombo. In 2020, the port handled 1.8 million tonnes of cargo.

Construction of the port commenced in January 2008. In 2016, it reported an operating profit of $1.81 million but was considered economically unviable. As debt repayment got difficult, the newly elected government decided to privatise an 80% stake of the port to raise foreign exchange in order to repay maturing sovereign bonds unrelated to the port. Of the two bidding companies, China Merchants Port was chosen, which was to pay $1.12 billion to Sri Lanka and spend additional amounts to develop the port into full operation.

In July 2017, the agreement was signed, but CMPort was allowed a 70% stake. Simultaneously a 99-year lease on the port was granted to CMPort.

As of May 2024, the port has transformed into a busy transshipment hub in the Indian Ocean, specifically for vehicles, facilitating a turnover of 700,000 units per month. Hambantota is poised to increase its involvement in the bunkering and oil refining industries, and it has the potential of becoming a significant hub for cruise activities.

== History ==
The Port of Hambantota was known in ancient times as Godawaya. It served as the main port of Ruhuna, and was a major port in the maritime silk route.

=== Redevelopment ===
Hambantota is located along the southern coast of Sri Lanka, six miles away from east–west shipping routes

The United National Front had pledged to build a seaport in Hambantota on winning the 2001 Sri Lankan parliamentary election. After victory, Sri Lankan Prime Minister Ranil Wickremesinghe announced the "Regaining Sri Lanka" economic development programme in 2002, which identified the Hambantota port for development. The plan also included building a refinery, petrochemical industries, a coal powered thermal power station, and a desalination plant. Beginning in the early 2000s, the Sri Lankan government sought to obtain funding from international creditors to develop Hambantota.

=== First feasibility study ===
In June 2002, Canadian engineering and construction firm SNC-Lavalin was invited to carry out a feasibility study, (Note: The ministry had also invited the authority of Port Autonome de Marseille to separately evaluate the project feasibility, after the company expressed interest to conduct a study for free and said that their study would be fully backed by the French government and the European Union. Political dispute prevented the French feasibility study from being conducted.) with funding from the Canadian International Development Agency. The study concluded that the port could be feasibly developed in three stages costing US$1.7 billion. It recommended that a joint venture between the Sri Lanka Ports Authority and a private consortium be set up to undertake the project under a build–own–operate–transfer arrangement.

A steering committee of the Ports Authority rejected the report as being non-comprehensive and lacking in primary research. The recommendation to begin container operations at the first stage of the project was criticised for ignoring the potential impact on existing operations at the Port of Colombo.

Canada was concerned about financing the project due to Sri Lankan domestic politics and the project did not advance.

=== Second feasibility study ===
During his 2005 presidential campaign, Hambantota native Mahinda Rajapaksa had pledged to revitalize Hambantota's economy. After his election, a second feasibility study was commissioned, this time from Danish consulting firm Ramboll.

Ramboll reached conclusions similar to those from SNC-Lavalin. The Ramboll study recommended the Hambantota port to bring in revenue by allowing the transport of non-containerised cargo before expanding the port to handle cargo containers, to allow the Port of Colombo to reach its capacity.

The Rajapaksa administration approached the United States and India with the Ramboll study and sought funding for the port project, but both countries declined.

=== China ===
After India declined to fund development of the port, Sri Lanka next sought funding from China.

One of the first companies involved in the port project was China Huanqiu Contracting and Engineering Corporation, a subsidiary of the state-owned China National Petroleum Corporation that had been doing business in Sri Lanka since 1997. After the Sri Lankan and Chinese governments agreed in 2005 to facilitate Chinese companies to be involved in Hambantota's refueling facilities and oil tank projects, the company became a contractor at Hambantota.

In July 2006, Sri Lankan foreign minister Mangala Samaraweera met in China with Li Ruogu, the president of the Export-Import Bank of China (China Exim). After this visit, Sri Lanka and China agreed that both countries would encourage Chinese companies to participate in the port project and encourage the use of concessional loans from China to finance the project. Sri Lankan President Rajapaksa visited China in February 2007 and the visit resulted in China's decision to fund the port development.

=== Belt and Road Initiative ===
The port is viewed as part of the 21st Century Maritime Silk Road (the maritime part of China's Belt and Road Initiative) that runs from the Chinese coast via the Suez Canal to the Mediterranean, and from there to the Upper Adriatic region of Trieste with its rail connections to Central and Eastern Europe.

== Location and plans ==
Sri Lanka is situated along the key shipping route between the Malacca Straits and the Suez Canal, which links Asia and Europe. An estimated 36,000 ships, including 4,500 oil tankers, use the route annually.

A new port will help relieve pressure on the Colombo port, and also provide services to ships that normally take three-and-a-half-day detours from their shipping lanes to receive these services, including refueling, maintenance, logistics and buying provisions and medical supplies.

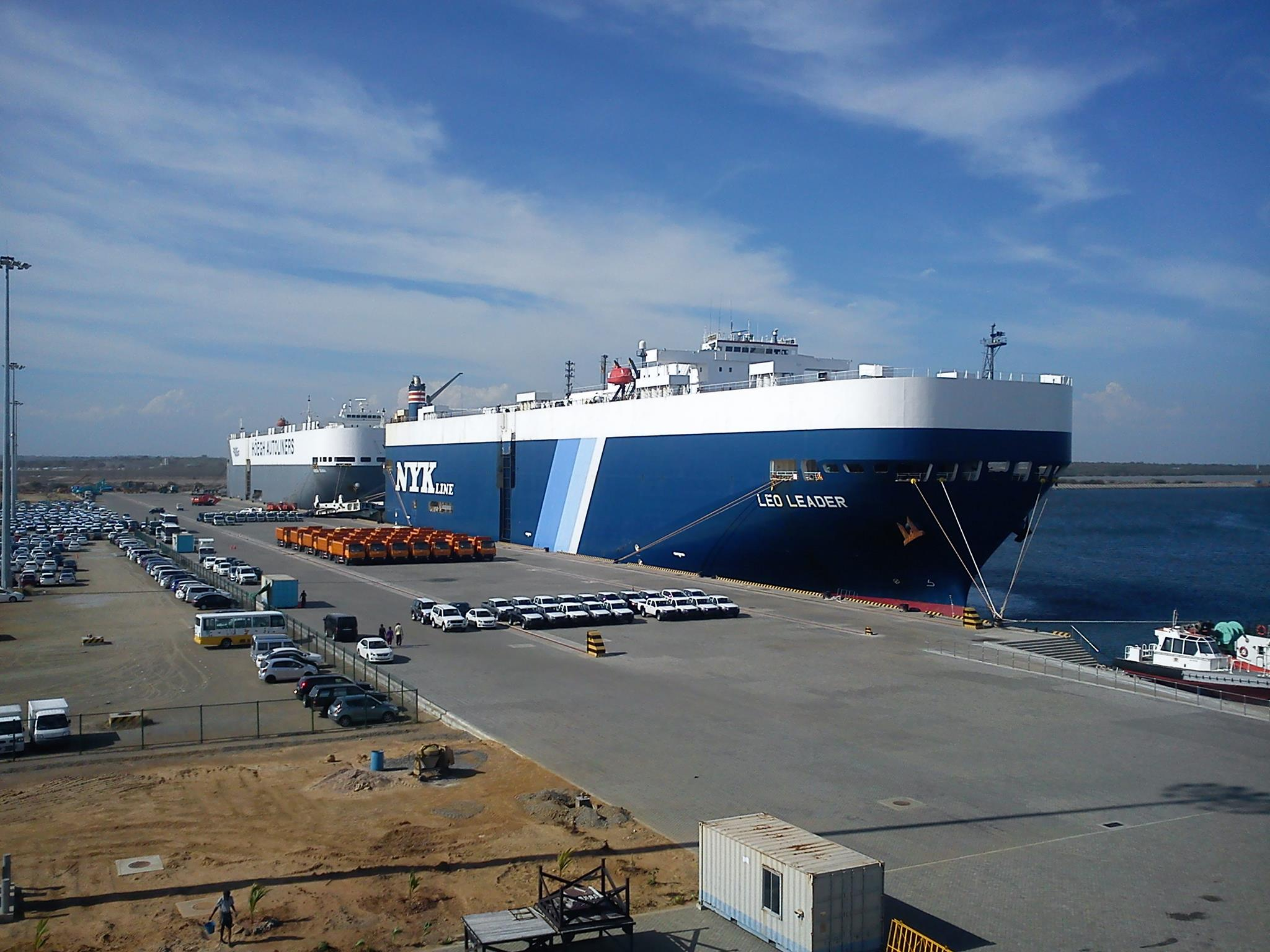
Hambantota Port

== Construction ==
The Sri Lankan government contracted with China Merchants Group, one of that country's state-owned enterprises, to build the port. The port was constructed in two phases.

=== First phase ===
The Chinese government financed phase one with a 15-year commercial loan from China Exim, which lent US$306.7 million (85% of the estimated total cost) while the Sri Lanka Ports Authority bore the rest. The loan carried a 6.3% interest rate and specified China Harbour Engineering Company, a state-owned enterprise, as the construction contractor.

A $76.5-million bunker terminal with an initial capacity of 500,000 tonnes was built, fitted with LPG tanks and fuel tanks for ships and aircraft, as well as ship repair, shipbuilding and crew change facilities.

The first phase of the port was inaugurated on 18 November 2010 by President Mahinda Rajapaksa, whom the port was named after. The accompanying ceremony cost ₨ 18.8 million and was subject to an investigation by the government for corruption. Jetliner, a Sri Lanka Navy passenger ship that sailed from Galle was ceremonially berthed and workers unloaded the first consignment of international cargo from Myanmar from the vessel Seruwila.

=== Second phase ===
The second phase of construction began in 2012 after China Exim loaned another $757 million with an interest rate of 2%. The loan agreement allowed China Harbour Engineering and China Merchants Port to jointly operate the terminal and take a 65% stake in the port for 35 years. After 35 years, the ownership of the port will be returned to the Sri Lanka Ports Authority.

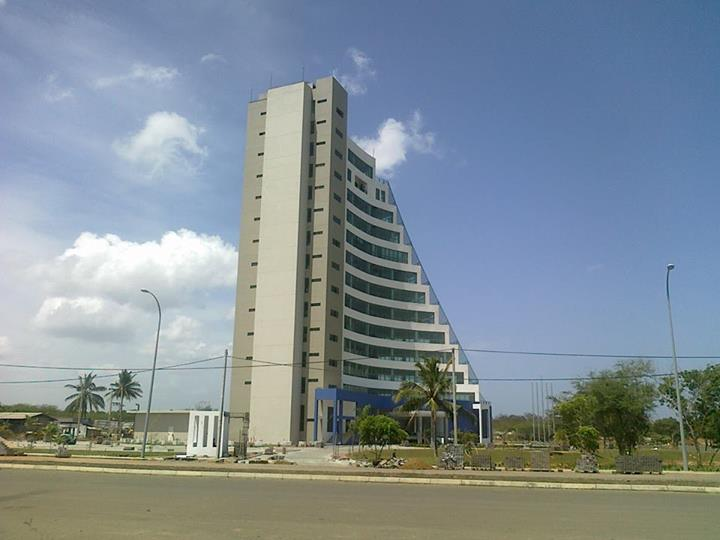
Hambantota Port Tower

=== Operation under Chinese joint venture ===
In 2016, the Sri Lanka Ports Authority had to repay ₨ 9 billion ($134 million) in construction fees for the Hambantota port, which, by the end of the year, accumulated a loss of ₨ 46.7 billion ($696 million). After the National United Front won the 2015 presidential and parliamentary elections, Prime Minister Ranil Wickremesinghe visited China to solve the issue. Then, the ports authority rescinded the agreement with the Chinese operators of the port and replaced it with a concession agreement signed in 2017. Under the 2017 agreement, Sri Lanka Ports Authority created Hambantota International Port Group (HIPG), which then became a joint venture after China Merchant Ports bought an 85% stake in HIPG as part of the Chinese company's $1.12 billion investment into the port. The agreement will expire 99 years after its effective date and allows HIPG to develop and operate the Hambantota port exclusively. The agreement also stipulated the creation of a 15,000-acre special economic zone.

The money from China Merchant Ports was used to strengthen Sri Lanka's US dollar reserves and pay short-term foreign debts unrelated to the port owed to non-Chinese creditors.

The agreement was delayed for several months because of concerns that the port could be used for military purposes and opposition from trade unions and political parties, which called it a sellout of Sri Lankan national assets to China. Former president Rajapaksa criticised the plan, including the special economic zone, and warned of social unrest if the plans were carried through. India and the United States raised concerns that Chinese control of the Hambantota port could harm their interests in the Indian Ocean. The large Chinese loans, the inability of the Sri Lankan government to service the loans, and the subsequent 99-year Chinese lease on the port have also led to accusations that China was practising debt-trap diplomacy, the factual accuracy of which is disputed. In September 2021, Sri Lankan geopolitics analyst Asanga Abeyagoonasekera described of a 'Strategic-trap diplomacy'.

In July 2018, the Sri Lankan government announced it would relocate its naval base at Galle to Hambantota.

In 2019, The HIPG introduced automation, represented the port in several international summits and signed agreements with international shipping companies. As a result, the nine-storey administration building of the port, the Hambantota Maritime Centre became 95% occupied and in just one year under the new management the port made a 136% increase in the volume of ro-ro vessels handled and even diversified its services to include other port-related activities such as container handling, general cargo, passenger, bunkering, bulk terminal, gas and project cargo.

In February 2021, the Sri Lankan foreign minister Dinesh Gunawardena said the lease of the Hambantota port to China was a mistake made by the previous government, after reports that Colombo was revisiting the agreement.

Writing in 2023, academic and former UK diplomat Kerry Brown states that China's relationship to the Hambantota port has become the opposite of the theorized debt-trap modus operandi. Brown observes that China has had to commit more money to the project, expose itself to further risk, and has had to become entangled in complex local politics. As of at least 2024, the port is not a significant commercial success, although shipping through the port is increasing.

As of May 2024, Hambantota port has become a thriving hub for transshipment in the Indian Ocean, particularly for vehicles, with a monthly turnover of 700,000 units. It is set to play a larger role in boosting the bunkering and oil refining industries, and it shows promise as a potential center for cruise activities. Tissa Wickramasinghe, the Chief Operating Officer of HIPG in Sri Lanka, conveyed contentment with the advancement of the port, affirming that it is successfully achieving its objectives and serving its intended purposes. He also noted that the port facilitated nearly 600,000 tonnes of bunkering operations last year, following the leasing of its bunkering facility to Sinopec.

In 2026 HIPG invested $108 million for six new quay cranes, 16 rubber-tyred gantry cranes and 40 trailers. The quay-cranes will have a 72-metre outreach, 55-metre lifting height and a 65-ton lifting capacity. This will expand the annual capacity of the port to approximately 2 million TEUs.

== Facilities ==
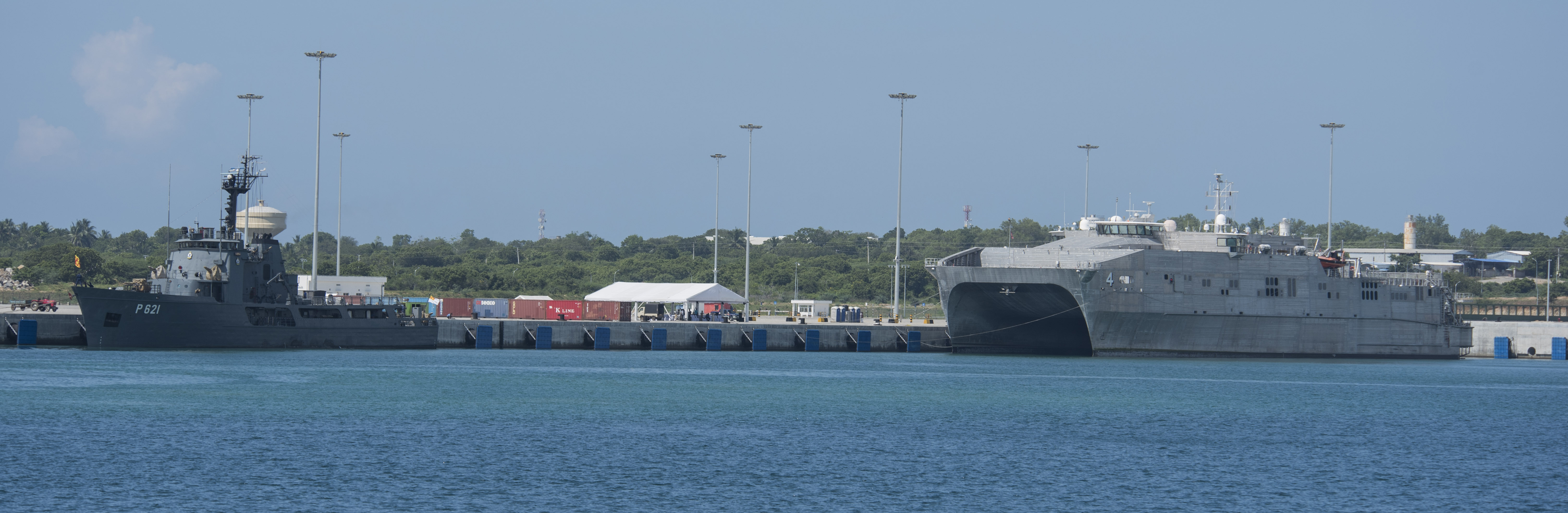
Sri Lanka Navy's SLNS Samudura and USNS Fall River (T-EPF-4) at Hambanthota Port in 2017

In 2020 Sinopec's Sri Lankan unit expanded Sri Lanka's share of the regional bunker market and invested $5 million on a tanker which flies the Sri Lankan flag. Lanka Marine Services (LMS) partnered with Sinopec in supplying very low sulphur fuel oil (VLSFO).

A $550 million tax-free port zone was set up outside the port. In 2016 a 15,000 acre SEZ project was announced with 5,000 acres from Hambantota and the rest from Monaragala, Embilipitiya and Matara.

In July 2019 LAUGFS Holdings opened a Liquid Petroleum Gas (LPG) terminal which imports butane and propane and produces LPG to sell domestically or re-export. Within the first 14 months, it had handled 413,000 metric tonnes of LPG, 60% of which was exported to Bangladesh, Maldives and India. As of September the terminal handles around 15 – 20 ship calls per month and it is expected to increase up to 30.

State-owned Litro Gas operates LPG terminal with a storage capacity of 3,000 metric tonnes.

== Port operations ==
The SLPA had decided to divert all vehicle shipments to the Ruhunu Magampura Mahinda Rajapaksa International port from May 31, 2012, as a measure to relieve the congestion at Sri Lanka's main port Colombo Harbour. On June 6, 2012, Ruhunu Magampura Mahinda Rajapaksa International Port officially started transshipment operations with the N4K FRICIA ship from Japan containing 15 vehicles and the Ellison Sun with 1000 vehicles from Chennai Harbour, India.

Japanese, South Korean and Indian car makers have begun transshipping increasing numbers of vehicles through the port. In the first nine months of 2014, the number of vehicles handled at Hambantota crossed the 100,000 mark, up more than 300% compared to the same period in 2013, with the number of ship calls more than doubling to 161. The biggest user of the port is the Hyundai plant near Chennai while Tata and Maruti vehicles also come from Mumbai. In future, all Hyundai vehicles made in South Korea, China and India will be transshipped through Hambantota 15,000 units a month once more yard space is available.

In April 2017, making a historic landmark in Sri Lanka, the world's largest pure car and truck carrier (PCTC), the MV Hoegh Trigger, arrived on her maiden call at the Port of Hambantota.

== Incidents ==
In December 2016, a mob of workers who were believed to be backed by Rajapaksa loyalists protesting against the leasing of the port vandalised the port and took several ships hostage. The 13-storey building was taken over by the strikers and was flooded, and CCTV systems and electricity were shut down. However, swift action by the Navy rescued the ships, and repair of damaged infrastructure began. The government accused leaders of the strike of protesting against the SEZ that happened in Hambantota, led by members of the Nil Balakaya, an organization created by Namal Rajapaksa; the government accused them of being political appointees. As a result, a shipping line also sent a bill of $400,000 in damages to the port authority. The government and Navy Commander Vice Admiral Ravindra Wijegunaratne were heavily criticized by civil activists and the media over an assault on a journalist during the protest.

== See also ==
- Belt and Road Initiative
- List of ports in Sri Lanka
- Mattala Rajapaksa International Airport
- Southern Expressway (Sri Lanka)
- Treaty ports

== Bibliography ==
- Brautigam, Deborah (2019). "A critical look at Chinese 'debt-trap diplomacy': the rise of a meme". Area Development and Policy. 5 (1): 1–14. doi:10.1080/23792949.2019.1689828. ISSN 2379-2949. S2CID 214547742.
- Carrai, Maria Adele (2019), "China's Malleable Sovereignty along the Belt and Road Initiative: The Case of the 99-Year Chinese Lease of Hambantota Port", NYU Journal of International Law and Politics, 51 (4): 1061–1100 – via Hein Online
- Singh, Ajit (2020). "The myth of 'debt-trap diplomacy' and realities of Chinese development finance". Third World Quarterly. 42 (2): 239–253. doi:10.1080/01436597.2020.1807318. ISSN 0143-6597. S2CID 225207135.
