= Northern Power Station =

The term Northern Power Station may refer to the following:

- Northern Power Station (South Australia), a power station in Australia.
- Northern Power Station (Sri Lanka), a power station in Sri Lanka.
