= South Asia Gateway Terminals =

Shipping service in Port of Colombo

- Type: Private
- Industry: Container terminals Port management
- Founded: 1999
- Headquarters: Colombo, Port of Colombo, Sri Lanka
- Area served: Sri Lanka
- Key people: Romesh David(CEO)
- Owner: John Keells Holdings
- Website: www.sagt.com.lk

South Asia Gateway Terminals Ltd also known as SAGT is a Sri Lankan container terminal transportation operating shipping service company located in the Port of Colombo. It is one of the three container terminals operating in Colombo Port. It is a private limited company owned by the John Keells Holdings which is the major shareholder. The terminal also consists of other major shareholders such as Evergreen Group, APM Terminals, Sri Lanka Ports Authority and Peony Investments. It is rated as one of the top container ports in the world.

== Operations ==
The terminal was founded in 1999 as a joint venture on a 30-year Build Operate Transfer concession and started its operations on 5 September 1999 developing the Queen Elizabeth Quay in the Port of Colombo. SAGT is the largest private sector investment in Sri Lanka and is also the first public-private partnership unit container terminal in Sri Lanka. SAGT mainly serves as the transport sector to JKH Holdings. Since 1999, the terminal has been playing a vital major role in the facilitation of international trade through Sri Lanka. It is also affiliated with the Board of Investments as a flagship company.

In 2015, the Journal of Commerce in US ranked SAGT as no 1 for terminal productivity in the South Asian region and ranked the terminal as the fourth most productive efficient terminal in the world. SAGT achieved 2 million TEUs in December 2018 recording its highest performance in a single calendar year. In May 2020, it introduced the paperless electronic clearance process for import containers due to the risks related to COVID-19 pandemic.

In July 2020, it became the first Sri Lankan terminal to collaborate with digital platform TradeLens, adopting the Blockchain technology to digitize the trade processes especially supply chains to improve the supply chain management.
