= Trincomalee Harbour =

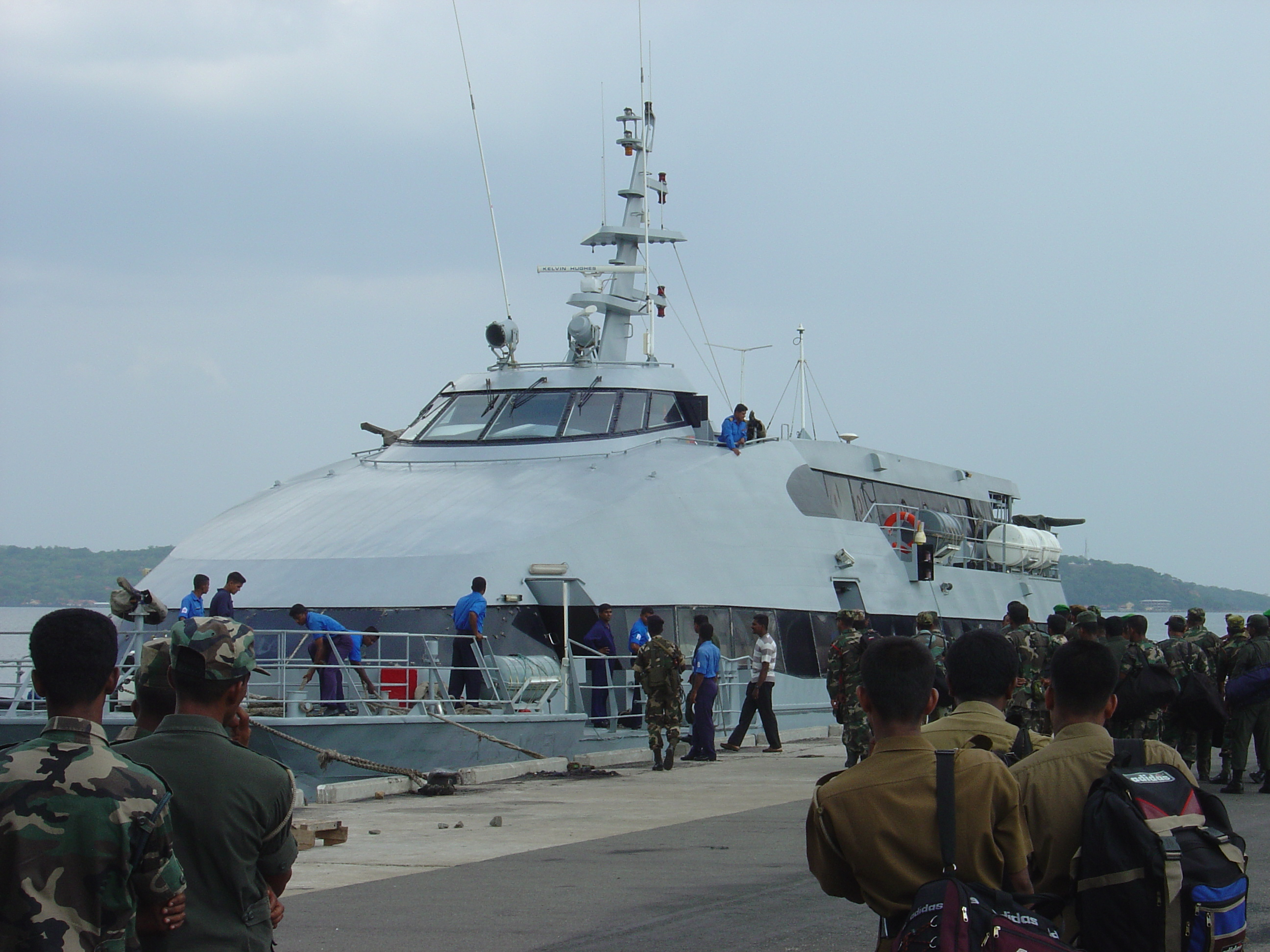
- Naval ship at Trincomalee

- Location in Sri Lanka

Location
- Country: Sri Lanka
- Location: Trincomalee
- Coordinates: 08°34′01″N 81°13′52″E
- UN/LOCODE: LKTRR

Details
- Opened: Pre-Independence
- Land area: 5,261 hectares (13,000 acres)

Statistics
- Website http://www.slpa.lk/

Trincomalee Harbour is a seaport in Trincomalee Bay or Koddiyar Bay, fourth largest natural harbour in the world and situated on the northeastern coast of Sri Lanka.

Located by Trincomalee, Sri Lanka, in the heart of the Indian Ocean, its strategic importance has shaped its history. There have been many sea battles to control the harbour. The Portuguese, Dutch, French, and the British have each held it in turn. In 1942 the Imperial Japanese Navy attacked Trincomalee harbour and sank three British warships anchored there.

== History ==
Trincomalee Harbour, formerly a British naval base, was taken over by the Inaams Ceylonese government in 1956 to be developed as a commercial port. The base in Trincomalee was fitted out to perform slipway repairs for the Navy.

The harbour is being developed for bulk, and break bulk, cargo and port-related industrial activities including heavy industries, tourism, agriculture, etc. At present SLPA is in the process to re-develop Trincomalee as a metropolis growth center.

== Geography ==
The harbour, one of the largest natural harbours in the world, is overlooked by terraced highlands, and its entrance is guarded by two headlands. The harbour has 1630 hectares of water, while the entrance channel is 500 metres wide. The bay includes the first of a number submarine canyons, making Trincomalee one of the finest deep-sea harbours in the world.

== Port facilities and operation ==
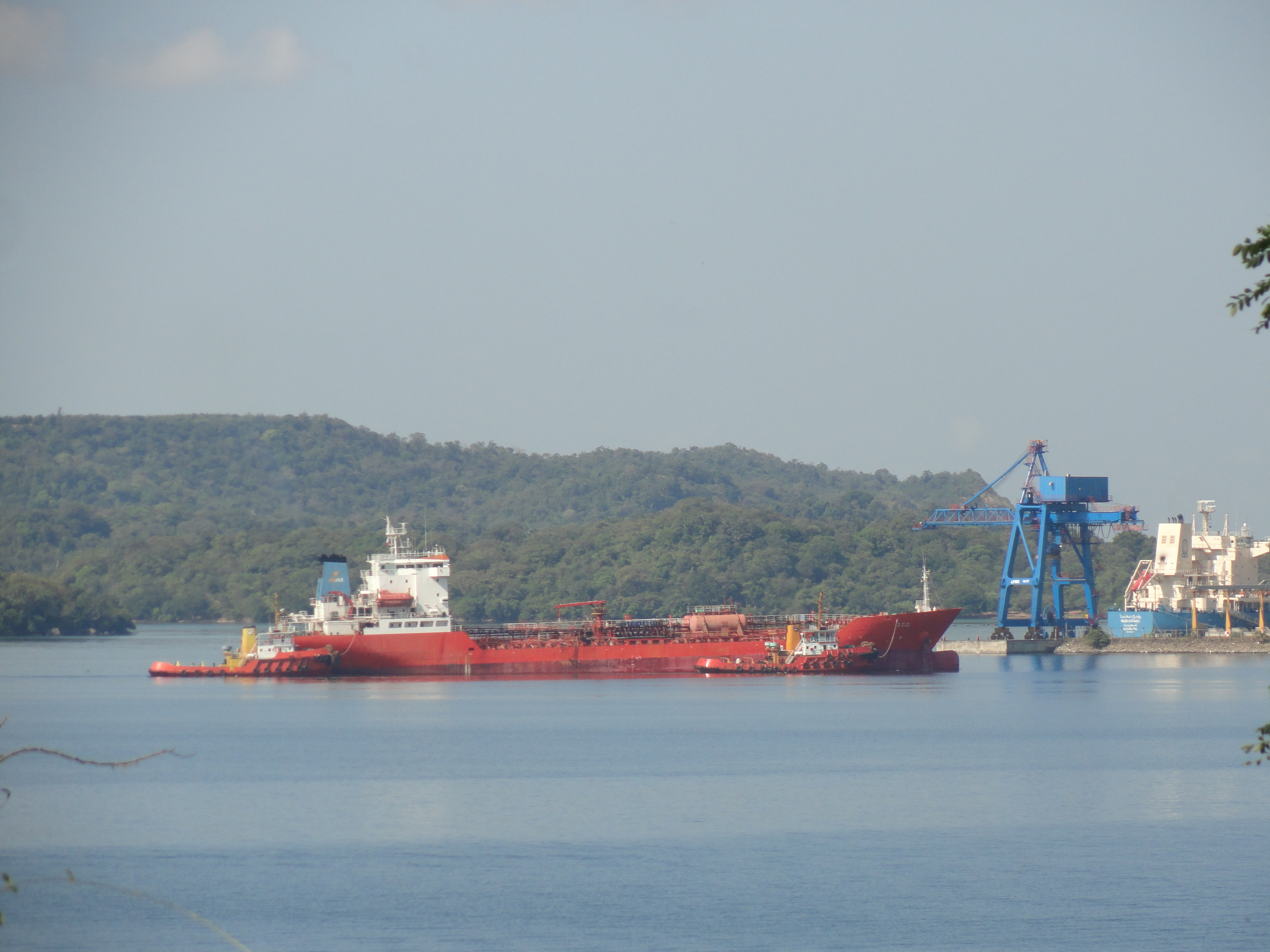
Trincomalee Harbour

The Port of Trincomalee works on a 24-hour basis. It is open every day of the year, except on May Day, when only daylight navigation is open.

=== Port dimensions ===
Water - 1,630 ha (4,000 acres)

Entrance channel - 500 m (1,600 ft)

Land Area - 5,261 ha (13,000 acres)

== See also ==
- SLN Dockyard
- List of ports in Sri Lanka
- Port of Colombo
- Sri Lanka Ports Authority
- List of deepest natural harbours
