= Kankesanthurai fort =

- Part of Jaffna
- Jaffna, Sri Lanka

Site information
- Type: Defense fort
- Condition: Destroyed

Site history
- Built by: Dutch
- Battles/wars: N/A

Kankesanthurai fort (Tamil: காங்கேசன்துறைக் கோட்டை, romanized: kāṅgēsanduṟaik kōṭṭai) was a small fort, built by the Dutch in Kankesanthurai, Sri Lanka. The fort was destroyed and there are no visible remains. Unlike other Dutch forts in Sri Lanka, there are no maps and little information on the fort. It is reported that there was a fort called Kankesanthurai fort although there is no detailed information on the fort itself.
