= Maviddapuram Kandaswamy Temple =

Hindu temple in Sri Lanka

- மாவிட்டபுரம் கந்தசாமி கோவில்
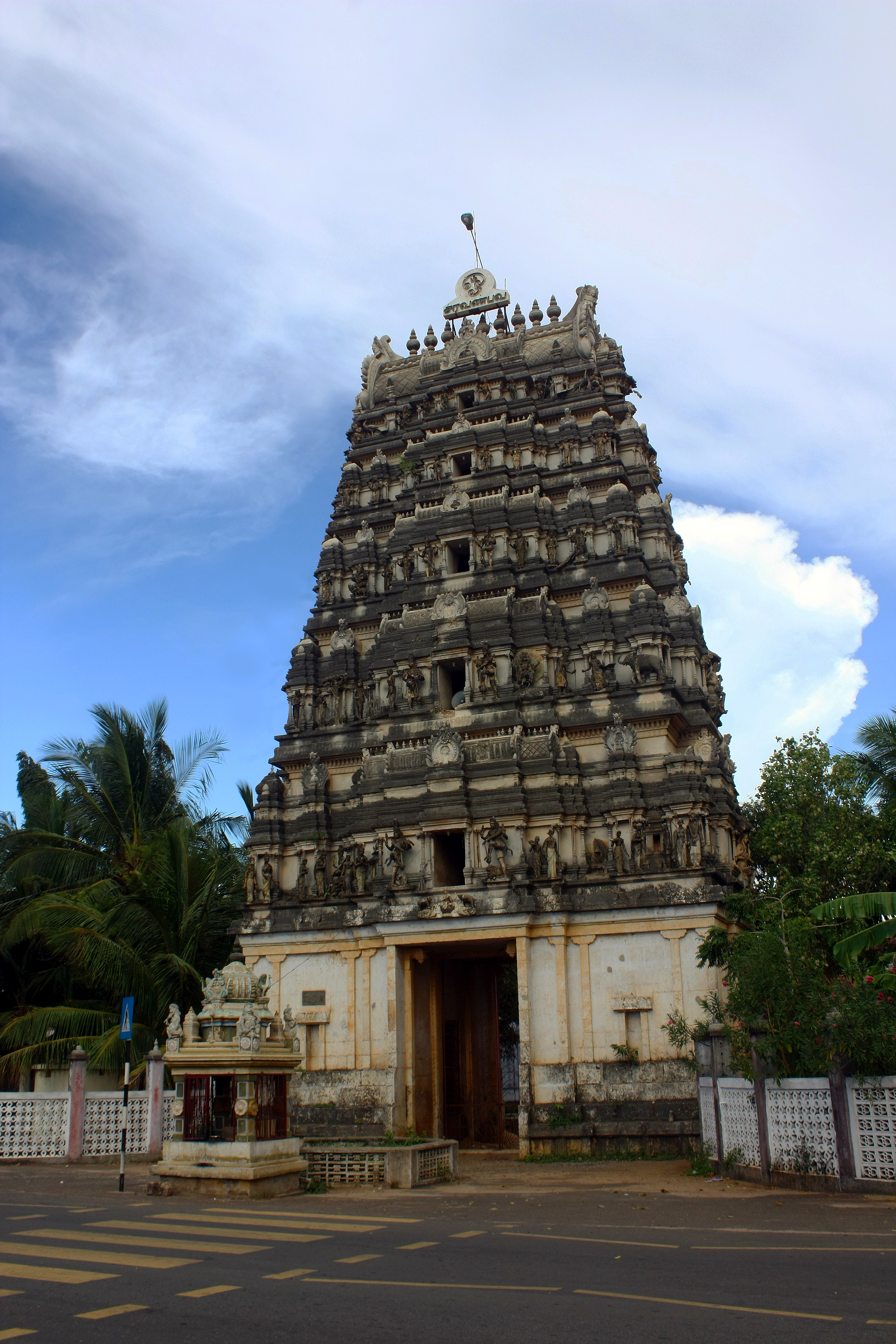

- Location within Northern Province

Religion
- Affiliation: Hinduism
- District: Jaffna District
- Deity: Murugan

Location
- Location: Maviddapuram
- State: Northern Province
- Country: Sri Lanka
- Interactive map of Maviddapuram Kandaswamy Temple
- Coordinates: 09°48′04.00″N 80°02′06.20″E

Architecture
- Archaeological Protected Monument of Sri Lanka
- Designated: 30.12.2011

Maviddapuram Kandaswamy Temple (Tamil: மாவிட்டபுரம் கந்தசாமி கோவில்) is a Hindu temple in Maviddapuram in northern Sri Lanka.

== History ==
According to legend, an 8th-century Chola (Note: Another source states that the princess was Pandyan.) princess Mathurapuraveeravalli, (Note: Also Maruthapuraveegavalli, Marutappiravikavalli.) daughter of Tissai Ughra Cholan, the King of Madurai, was inflicted with a persistent intestinal disorder as well as facial disfigurement which made her face look like a horse. She was advised by a priest/sage to bathe in the freshwater spring at Keerimalai. After bathing in the spring Mathurapuraveeravalli's illness and disfigurement vanished. In gratitude she renovated a Hindu shrine, located in Kovil Kadavai about two kilometers south east of the spring, into a full temple honouring the Hindu god Murugan (Skanda). The King of Madurai sent sculptors, artists, building material, granite, statues, gold, silver etc. to assist with the renovation. The temple's statue of Kankesan (Murugan) was brought via the port of Gayathurai which was later renamed Kankesanthurai.

The name Maviddapuram is derived from ma (horse), vidda (removed) and puram (holy city). The temple was destroyed and rebuilt several times. The present day temple dates from the 17th century.

Only "high" caste Hindus had been allowed to worship in the temple. In 1968 several hundred "low" caste Hindus, mainly Pallar and Nalavar, staged a non-violent protest outside the temple gates but were met with violence from a group of "high" caste Hindus. In June 1968 "low" caste Hindus stormed the temple. They were given access to the temple following the intervention of Illankai Tamil Arasu Kachchi (ITAK, Federal Party). C. Suntharalingam, who had led the "high" caste resistance to opening the temple up to the "low" castes, was prosecuted under the Prevention of Social Disabilities Act and fined Rs. 50 by the Supreme Court. This act, which had been brought in as a private member's bill by ITAK in 1957, made the denial of entry into a place of worship on grounds of caste an offence.

During the early 1990s the northern part of the Valikamam region were declared a High Security Zone (HSZ) and all the residents expelled. The temple was inside the HSZ and as a result its priests were evicted by the military. The temple's structure was bombed and its contents looted. Following the end of the civil war the military relaxed some restrictions on entering the HSZ, allowing priests and worshipers to return to the temple. The temple's 108 foot gopuram has been re-built but much of the 17th century temple was destroyed during the civil war.

The temple was declared an archaeological protected monument in December 2011.
