= HSC Cheriyapani =

Ferry connecting India and Sri Lanka

Cheriyapani
- Locale: Nagapattinam, India and Kankesanthurai, Sri Lanka
- Waterway: Palk Strait
- Transit type: High-speed craft ferry
- Operator: Tamil Nadu Maritime Board
- Began operation: 14 October 2023; 2 years ago
- System length: 110 km (68 mi)
- No. of vessels: 1
- No. of terminals: 2 (Tamil Nadu, Northern Province)

HSC Cheriyapani is a high-speed craft passenger ferry that connects Nagapattinam in Tamil Nadu, India with Kankesanthurai in the Jaffna District of Northern Province, Sri Lanka. The ferry commenced service on 14 October 2023. It is the first transit service connecting the two countries since the Indo-Ceylon Express, which ceased service to Sri Lanka in 1982 after the outbreak of the Sri Lankan Civil War.

== History ==
Sri Lanka's strategic location in the Indian Ocean has long attracted attention from regional rivals India and China. For years, free-flowing loans and infrastructure investments from China helped it gain an greater influence against India in partnerships with Sri Lanka.

=== Plans for an India-Sri Lanka ferry ===
The plan for a ferry service connecting India and Sri Lanka was first proposed in 2011 when Sri Lanka was making efforts to alter its image following the Sri Lankan Civil War. At the time, two services were considered: one connecting Thoothukudi and Colombo, and a second linking Rameswaram with Talaimannar. The two countries signed a memorandum of understanding for sea connectivity and established a ferry service between Thoothukudi and Colombo, which was discontinued after six months due to logistical issues.

In mid-July 2023, a virtual meeting was held between Indian Additional Secretary of the Ministry of Ports, Shipping and Waterways Rajesh Kumar Sinha, and Sri Lankan Secretary of the Ministry of Ports, Shipping and Aviation K. D. S. Ruwanchandra. The meeting, conducted under the India-Sri Lanka Joint Committee, discussed resuming ferry services between the two nations to boost regional trade, tourism, and stronger people-to-people relations in the region.

A ferry service between the two countries previously existed via the Indo-Ceylon Express, which had express trains leading to and from a ferry boat that connected the Indian town of Dhanushkodi to Talaimannar in Sri Lanka. The transportation line collectively connected Chennai to Colombo. This service ran from 1914 up until 1982, when it was halted due to the increasing threat of the Sri Lankan Civil War. The northern and eastern regions of the country were under the control of the LTTE.

On 20 July 2023, Sri Lankan President Ranil Wickremesinghe made a diplomatic trip to India, during which he and Indian Prime Minister Narendra Modi signed a series of energy, development, and trade agreements. The trip was meant to develop stronger ties between the two nations, as well as boost the economy of Sri Lanka, which was going through an economic crisis. President Wickremesinghe and Prime Minister Modi unveiled agreements on technology, renewable energy, and greater connectivity designed to deepen bilateral relations between India and Sri Lanka. Among things proposed during this visit were connecting the two nations' electricity grids, building a petroleum pipeline and land bridge between the two countries, as well as resuming the previously halted passenger ferry service. Prime Minister Modi stated that India was interested in connecting its ports in the South to ports in Sri Lanka's Trincomalee and Colombo.

=== Commencement of service ===
The Cheriyapani ferry commenced service on 8:15am IST on 14 October 2023, with 50 passengers and 12 crew members under Captain Biju George of India. The ferry service was initially planned to commence on 10 October, but underwent some administrative issues and had to be rescheduled for 12 October, and then 14 October. The first day of service had a ferry ticket price reduced by 75% to ₹2,375. At least 30 travelers had booked tickets for the first trip.

Indian Prime Minister Narendra Modi released a video statement on social media commemorating the start of the service, stating, “We are embarking on a new chapter in the diplomatic and economic relations between India and Sri Lanka. The launch of a ferry service between Nagapattinam and Kankesanthurai is an important milestone in strengthening our relations.”

After being suspended for several months due to the Northeast monsoon and unspecified "technical difficulties", the ferry service resumed on 16 August 2024.

== Operations ==
Cheriyapani travels from Nagapattinam to Kankesanthurai via the Palk Strait. Service is administered by the Tamil Nadu Maritime Board in India. The trip takes 3–4 hours to complete depending on ocean conditions, and covers a distance of 110 km (68 mi). The ferry departs each location once per day, leaving Nagapattinam at 7am IST and arriving in Kankesanthurai around 11am. The return trip departs Sri Lanka at 1.30pm, arriving in India around 5.30pm. Each passenger is allowed a 40 kg (88 lb) baggage.

=== Fares ===
The ferry ticket costs ₹7,670 (roughly US$90), which consists of a ₹6,500 base fare, plus an 18% GST. Online ticket sales are set to commence in January 2024. Until then, passengers phone ahead to reserve their tickets at least 24 hours in advance, and must send copies of their passports to the operator via WhatsApp.
