= Pettah Power Station =

- Country: Ceylon
- Location: Colombo
- Status: Decommissioned
- Commission date: 1898
- Owner: CEB

Thermal power station
- Primary fuel: Diesel

Pettah Power Station was a thermal power station in Colombo in south western Ceylon.

== History ==
Pettah Power Station opened in 1898 and was located on Gasworks Street in the Pettah area of central Colombo. It was Ceylon's second power station after the one on Bristol Street in the Fort area. It was acquired by the Colombo Electric Tramways and Lighting Company (CETLC) after the company was formed in 1902. CETLC was bought by the government in 1928 and its operations transferred to the Department of Government Electrical Undertakings (DGEU). One more 3 MW steam turbine was added in the 1930s. Three 1 MW diesel generator sets were added during World War II.

In 1956 the station's generating capacity stood at 9 MW (one 3 MW steam unit and three 2 MW Mirlees diesel units). Six 2 MW Mirlees diesel units were installed in 1957. In 1959 the station's generating capacity stood at 16 MW (one 3 MW steam unit, three 1 MW diesel units and five 2 MW diesel units).

By the early 1960s the station's generating capacity stood at 18 MW (one 3 MW steam unit, three 1 MW diesel units and six 2 MW diesel units) but its effective generating capacity stood at 14.5 MW. 4 MW of diesel units were transferred to Chunnakam Power Station. In 1969 the station's generating capacity stood at 16 MW.

By the early 1980s the station's generating capacity stood at 6 MW (three 2 MW diesel units from the 1950s) and, although each unit was capable of 1.8 MW output, they were only operating at 1.5 MW each.
