= Uthuru Janani Power Station =

- Country: Sri Lanka
- Location: Chunnakam
- Coordinates: 9°44′27″N 80°02′00″E
- Status: Operational
- Construction began: April 2012
- Commission date: 1 January 2013
- Construction cost: 3,500 million Rs (2013)
- Operator: CEB

Thermal power station
- Primary fuel: Fuel oil
- Feed-in tariff: 17.86 Sri Lankan rupee (per kilowatt-hour)

Power generation
- Units operational: 3 × 8 MW
- Make and model: Unknown (3)
- Nameplate capacity: 24 MW
- Annual net output: 176 GWh

The Uthuru Janani Power Station (also sometimes called the New Chunnakam Power Station, as it is the replacement of the former Chunnakam Power Station) is a 24-megawatt thermal power station commissioned in January 2013 and officially inaugurated on 12 February 2013 in Chunnakam, Sri Lanka. It is owned and operated by the Ceylon Electricity Board (CEB). The power station consists of three diesel engine generating units operating on heavy fuel oil with a capacity of 8 MW each. In 2024, the station generated 92.551 GWh of gross electricity and 89.716 GWh of net electricity, with a plant factor of 43.9%.

Construction of the power plant began in May 2012 and was completed in December 2012. The engineering, procurement and construction contract was carried out by Lakdhanavi Limited. The three generator sets use medium-speed Wärtsilä 20V32 engines, while the synchronous alternators were manufactured by AVK Germany. The station is connected to the Chunnakam 132/33 kV grid substation through a 33 kV outgoing line. It has two 11/33 kV, 20 MVA step-up transformers and two 11/0.4 kV, 1.25 MVA auxiliary transformers.

The plant is built approximately 300 m (980 ft) north-west of the 36 MW privately owned Northern Power Station, and was ceremonially opened by former President Mahinda Rajapaksa. The plant includes fuel storage facilities, a fuel treatment house, an oily-water treatment plant and a sludge incinerator. The fuel storage tanks can hold sufficient heavy fuel oil for approximately one month of operation at full load.

In 2024, the plant's average fuel rate was 0.22 litres per kilowatt-hour and its average thermal efficiency was 42.4%.

== History ==
The Uthuru Janani Power Station was established to replace the older Chunnakam Power Station. The Supreme Court of Sri Lanka described Uthuru Janani as the new thermal power station that replaced the ageing Chunnakam station, which had been decommissioned around the end of 2012.

During 2013, the station generated 125.32 GWh of electricity, with an availability factor of 95.30% and a plant factor of 60.00%.

== See also ==
- Northern Power Station
- List of power stations in Sri Lanka
