= Kankesanthurai Lighthouse =

- Location: Kankesanthurai; Northern Province; Sri Lanka
- Coordinates: 09°48′58.15″N 80°02′42.4″E

Tower
- Constructed: 1893
- Construction: masonry tower
- Height: 22 metres (72 ft)
- Shape: octagonal tower with balcony and lantern
- Markings: white tower and lantern

Light
- Focal height: 25 metres (82 ft)
- Range: 14 nautical miles (26 km; 16 mi)
- Characteristic: Fl (3) W 15s.

Kankesanthurai Lighthouse is a lighthouse in Kankesanthurai in northern Sri Lanka. Built in 1893, the 22 metres (72 ft) lighthouse has an octagonal masonry tower with lantern and gallery. Located deep inside the Sri Lankan military's Valikamam North High Security Zone and next to a naval base, the lighthouse was heavily damaged during the Sri Lankan Civil War and is inactive.

== See also ==
- List of lighthouses in Sri Lanka
