= China Merchants Port =

Chine partially state-owned company

China Merchants Port Holdings Co. Ltd.
- Native name: 招商局控股港口有限公司
- Type: State-owned enterprise (Red chip); Public company
- Traded as: SEHK: 144
- Industry: Shipping and Logistics
- Founded: 28 May 1991
- Headquarters: Hong Kong, People's Republic of China
- Area served: People's Republic of China
- Key people: Chairman: Li Xiaopeng
- Net income: 7,955,100,000 (2018)
- Owner: China Merchants Group (55.4%)
- Number of employees: 9,149 (2018)
- Parent: China Merchants Group
- Website: cmport.com.hk

China Merchants Port Holdings Company Limited (SEHK: 144) is a major conglomerate based in Hong Kong and is involved in a range of businesses such as port operations, general and bulk cargo transportation, container and shipping business, air cargo, logistics park operations and paint products. China Merchants Port is considered as a Red Chip company as the Hong Kong Stock Exchange listing. The company has port facilities in mainland China and Hong Kong, and the predecessor was founded in 1991. The predecessor of the parent company was established in 1872 and was the preeminent industrial and commercial group in mainland China. Before changing its name to China Merchants Port Holdings Company Limited, the company was formerly known as China Merchants Holdings (International) Company Limited.

== History ==
On 28 May 1991, the company's predecessor was founded in Hong Kong.

On 16 June 1997, the company adopted the title China Merchants Holdings (International) Company Limited (招商局國際有限公司).

On 15 July 1997, the company was listed in the Hong Kong Stock Exchange.

On 10 August 2016, the company adopted its current title.

== Company background ==
China Merchants Port's predecessor was founded in Hong Kong on 28 May 1991, and changed to its present name in 1997. Port facilities are located in Hong Kong and mainland China, such as Shanghai, Tianjin and Qingdao. However, China Merchants Port was truly founded in 1872 as the first merchant company of the Qing dynasty and has experienced a history that stretches from the Republic of China to the official establishment of the People's Republic of China. Port facilities are located in Hong Kong and mainland China. Its national port network is spread across the Pearl River Delta, Bohai Economic Zone, Xiamen Bay Economic Zone, Yangtze River Delta and Southwest China. This includes the coastal hub ports of Hong Kong, Shanghai, Qingdao and Xiamen Bay.

Besides the operations in Hong Kong and mainland China, it also operates overseas. Its investments are concentrated in developing countries such as Nigeria and among other African countries, as well as the countries among South Asia, especially in Sri Lanka, the port of Hambantota that located in southern Sri Lanka is one of the biggest foreign investment by China Merchants Port. The company has approximately 130 berths for loading and unloading at wharves and piers worldwide, with a capacity of 60 million containers. It controls more than 30% of the berths in mainland China. The company operates through its port operations, bonded logistics business and other businesses. These include container terminal operations, break-bulk terminals, the operation of logistics parks operated by China Merchants Ports and its associates, including port transportation and airport cargo handling, as well as property development and investment, including the construction of modular buildings and the provision of container terminal services. In addition, China Merchants Port is involved in port development and berth operations, as well as tugboat berthing assistance and barge services when ships arrive in port, cargo handling during loading and unloading, and providing ships with shore power and fresh water.

China Merchants Port is one of three Chinese enterprises named among the top 10 terminal operators in the world; the other two are Hutchison Port Holdings and COSCO Shipping Ports. In the 2018 Lloyd's list of the top 10 global port operators, China Merchants Port was ranked fifth, as of 2018, they have a network of 34 ports in 18 countries around the world, such as Houston in the US and Newcastle in Australia.

== Structure of the company ==
The majority of the shareholders in China Merchants Port are insiders. The insiders held 65.26% of the shares in the company, as the largest shareholder of the company is China Merchants Group, its parent company, accounting for 43% of the total shares, while China Merchants Technology Holdings Co. Ltd. accounting for 21.9% of the shares. Institutions held 27.87% of the float and 9.68% of the shares. The number of Institutions holding shares is 223.

China Merchants Port has operations in 25 countries, with a network of 41 ports by 2020, including Sri Lanka's Colombo International Container Terminal Limited and Togo's Lomé Container Terminal S.A. The parent company, China Merchants Group, achieved sales of CNY 649.9 billion in 2019. In 2020, the company had total revenue of US$1,147,838,440, with the port business accounting for 93% of the company's revenue and the bonded logistics and other operations accounting for the rest.

In February 2018, the company completed the sale of its indirectly owned unit, Shenzhen Chiwan Wharf Holdings Limited, which provides logistics, container terminal and port management services and has interests in operations in general and bulk cargo terminals businesses. The expected net proceeds from the sale are HK$3.88 billion (US$496.3 million).

=== China Merchants Port's Publicly Available Shareholders ===
Shareholders	Shares
China Merchants Port Group Co., Ltd.	43.3%
China Merchants Technology Holdings Co. Ltd.	21.9%
BlackRock Fund Advisors	1.3%
The Vanguard Group, Inc.	1.2%
Dimensional Fund Advisors LP	0.6%
Manulife Investment Management (Hong Kong) Ltd.	0.3%
DJE Kapital AG	0.3%
BlackRock Advisors (UK) Ltd.	0.3%
Norges Bank Investment Management	0.3%
CTBC Investments Co., Ltd.	0.3%

=== Top 6 Mutual Fund Holder ===
Holder	Shares	Out of %	Date Reported
Vanguard International Stock Index-Emerging Markets Stk	20,024,671	0.53%	Jan 31, 2022
Vanguard International Stock Index-Total Intl Stock Indx	18,449,361	0.49%	Jan 31, 2022
iShares Global Infrastructure ETF	16,810,000	0.44%	Jan 31, 2022
iShares Core MSCI Emerging Markets ETF	11,742,270	0.31%	Feb 28, 2022
New World Fund, Inc.	10,308,000	0.27%	Jan 31, 2022
DFA Emerging Markets Core Equity Portfolio	7,902,958	0.21%	Jan 31, 2022

=== China Merchants Port's Related Companies ===
China Merchants Group Ltd.
China Merchants International Terminals (Ningbo) Ltd.
China Merchants International Terminal (Qingdaoco) Co., Ltd.
China Merchants Port Development (Shenzhen) Co., Ltd.
China Merchants Hldgs International China Investment Co. Ltd.
China Merchants (Luxembourg) SARL
China Merchants Holdings (Djibouti) FZE
China Merchants Finance Co. Ltd.
China Merchants Bonded Logistics Co., Ltd.

=== Company manager ===
Table 1 provides information on the company's major managers, specifying each person's full name and their roles.

Name	Position
Xiu-Feng Wang	Vice Chairman and chief executive officer
Xiao-Ping Tu	Chief Financial Officer and Financial Controller
Jian-Li Zhao	General Manager-Audit Department
Yi-Ming Zhang	Deputy General Manager
Kong Yim	Executive Director & Managing Director

=== Indexed stock ===
In the quarterly review of Hang Seng Index composition ended on Jun 29 2018, it was announced by Hang Seng Indexes Company that China Merchants Port will be removed from constituent stocks from Sep 10, 2018, and replaced by another. The decision to remove China Merchants Port was due to its turnover volume and market capitalisation failed to meet the minimum requirements.

=== Port assets ===
China Merchants Port terminals
City	Country	Port (Terminal)	Ownership
Colombo	Sri Lanka	Port of Colombo	
Hambantota	Sri Lanka	Hambantota International Port	
Hong Kong	China	Port of Hong Kong (CMCS)	
Lomé	Togo	Port of Lomé (Lomé Container Terminal)	
Paranaguá	Brazil	Port of Paranaguá (Terminal de Contêineres de Paranaguá)	
Shantou	China	Port of Shantou	60%
Shenzhen	China	Port of Shenzhen (Chiwan container terminal)	
Shenzhen	China	Port of Shenzhen (Shekou container terminal)	
Shenzhen	China	Port of Shenzhen (Shenzhen haixing port development)	
Shenzhen	China	Port of Shenzhen (Zhaogang)	
Xiamen	China	Zhangzhou China Merchants Port	60%
Zhanjiang	China	Port of Zhanjiang	58.35%

=== China Merchants Port overseas terminals ===
China Merchants Port engaged with the Multipurpose Port of Colombo, Colombo International Container Terminal Limited and the Hambantota Port project in Sri Lanka and also the Lomé Container Terminal in Togo in relation to China's Belt and Road Initiative. The company is also helping to fund a US$10 billion Tanzanian port in Bagamoyo, Tanzania, promoted by the Tanzanian government. China Merchants Port purchase 90% stock in TCP Participações SA, A, the second largest container terminal in Brazil with a design capacity of 1.5 million TEU, for US$923.7 million. This acquisition in 2017 allowed the company to expand its presence in the Latin America region.

==== Port of Colombo ====
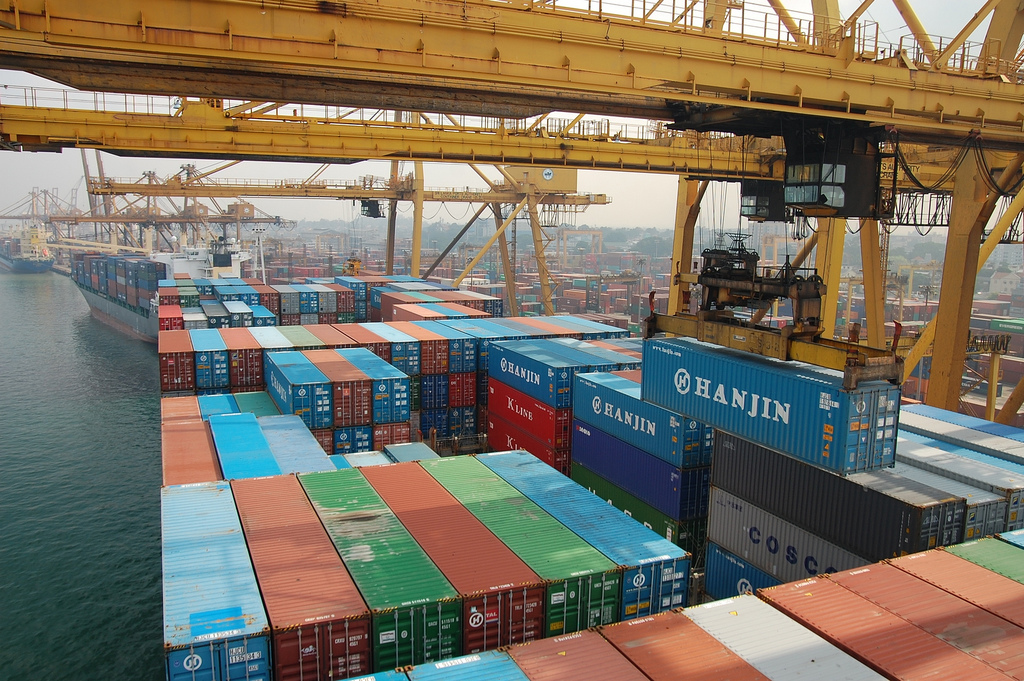
The Port of Colombo

The Port of Colombo is the largest port located in the southwestern shores on the Kelani River of Sri Lanka. China Merchants Port has held a groundbreaking ceremony at the Port of Colombo in Sri Lanka in 2014 as the new container terminal has launched there. This is one of the largest foreign investments in the country, with a total value of more than US$500 million.

==== Port of Hambantota ====
The Hambantota International Port is a port in southern Sri Lanka, is located a few hundred kilometres off the coast of India, on a vital economic and military waterway. Construction and investment in the port have come from China, which first signed a US$1.3 billion agreement for the Hambantota port project in 2007, with financing from China Exim Bank and China Merchants Port, while China Harbour Engineering Corporation (CHEC) is responsible for the construction of the port.

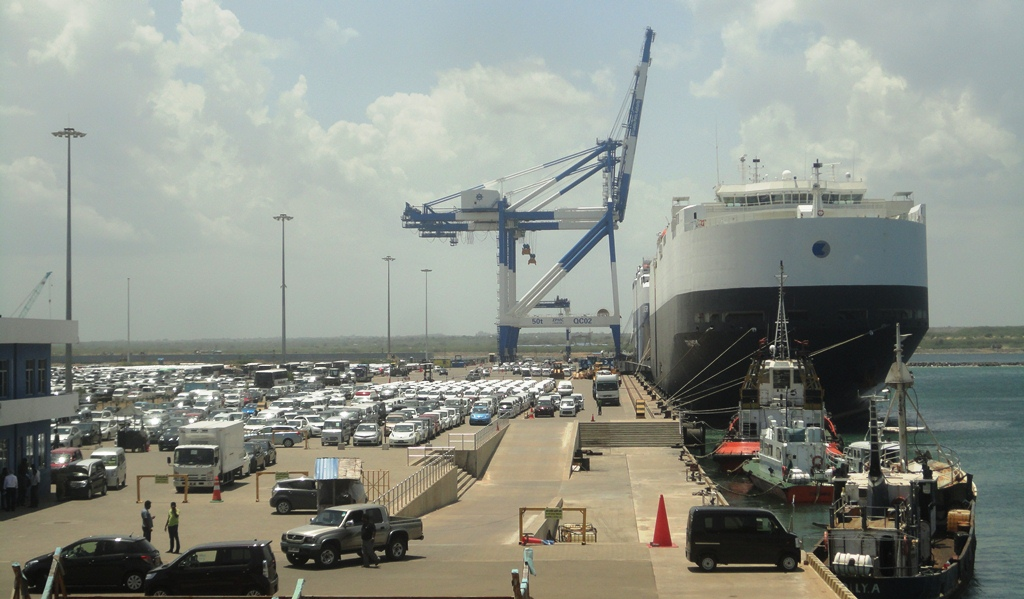
Port of Hambantota

With the Port of Hambantota's expansion, China Merchants Port Holdings has become the major shareholder of the Hambantota Port. Sirisena, a member of the Parliament of Sri Lanka, negotiates with China Merchants Port and sells the government's majority stake in the terminal company. They signed an agreement with The Sri Lanka Port Authority in 2017 in which China Merchants Port leased the Port of Hambantota for operation for 99 years. At the same time, China Merchants Port purchase a 70% stake of the Hambantota Port from Sri Lankan government for $1.1 billion in July 2017, including the 42-hectares artificial island located at the port opening.

This new equity from China Merchants Port increased Sri Lanka's foreign exchange reserves and facilitated Sri Lanka's repayment of its debts to non-Chinese creditors.

==== Lomé Container Terminal ====
Lomé Container Terminal was developed and is operated in Togo by a consortium of China Merchants Port and Terminal Investment Limited each being an 50% shareholder. Lomé Container Terminal construction works started in 2012 and started operations at Oct.23th 2014,

==== Terminal de Contêineres de Paranaguá ====
Terminal de Contêineres de Paranaguá is a container terminal located in the Port of Paranaguá in Brazil. A quarter of the company's containerised exports and imports depart or arrive in China. In 2017, China Merchants Port agreed to purchase 90% stock in TCP Participações SA for US$935 million and increase its annual container throughput "from 1.5 million TEUs to 2.5 million TEUs".

== Terminal Link joint venture ==
As part of China's "Maritime Silk Road" plan, the company has increased its overseas port facility investments in recent years. The sea routes, proposed by Chinese Communist Party leader Xi Jinping, aim to connect China to Europe via Southeast Asia and the Middle East. With that purpose in mind, the company enter a joint venture by acquiring 49% stake in Terminal Link, with CMA CGM, the combination of Compagnie Maritime d'Affrètement (CMA) and Compagnie Générale Maritime (CGM), keeping the 51% majority share.

Terminal Link terminals
City	Country	Port (Terminal)
Abidjan	Ivory Coast	Port of Abidjan (Terra Abidjan)
Antwerp	Belgium	Port of Antwerp (Antwerp Gateway)
Busan	South Korea	Port of Busan (Busan New Container Terminal)
Casablanca	Morocco	Port of Casablanca (Soma port)
Dunkirk	France	Port of Dunkirk (Terminal des Flandres)
Houston	United States	Port of Houston (Houston Terminal Link)
Kingston	Jamaica	Kingston Harbour (Kingston Freeport Terminal)
Laem Chabang	Thailand	Laem Chabang Port (Laem Chabang (International Terminal)
Le Havre	France	Port of Le Havre (Terminal de France and Terminal Nord)
Marseille	France	Marseille-Fos Port (Eurofos)
Montoir-de-Bretagne	France	Port of Montoir de Bretagne (Terminal du Grand Quest)
Malta	Malta	Malta Freeport (Malta Freeport Terminal)
Miami	United States	Port of Miami (South Florida Container Terminal)
Odessa	Ukraine	Port of Odessa (Odessa Terminal)
Qingdao	China	Qingdao Port (Qingdao Qianwan United Container Terminal)
Rotterdam	Netherlands	Port of Rotterdam (Rotterdam World Gateway)
Singapore	Singapore	Port of Singapore (CMA CGM-PSA Lion Terminal)
Tangier	Morocco	Port of Tanger Med (Eurogate Tanger)
Thessaloniki	Greece	Port of Thessaloniki Thessaloniki Port Terminal
Umm Qasr	Iraq	Umm Qasr Port CMA CGM Terminal Iraq S.A.S.
Vũng Tàu	Vietnam	Vũng Tàu Port (Vung Tau Container Terminal)
