= Maiden call =

In shipping, a maiden call is the first time a particular ship arrives at a port. A ceremony may be held where port officials present a plaque to the vessel in commemoration of the call date. Other types of ports also track maiden calls.
