= Oluvil Harbour =

- Interactive map of Oluvil Harbour

Location
- Country: Sri Lanka
- Location: Oluvil, Ampara District
- Coordinates: 07°16′30″N 81°52′00″E
- UN/LOCODE: LKOLU

Details
- Opened: September 1, 2013
- Operated by: Sri Lanka Ports Authority
- Type of harbour: Commercial & Fishery
- Size of harbour: 16 ha (40 acres)
- Land area: 165 ha (410 acres)

Statistics
- Website http://www.slpa.lk/

The Oluvil Harbour is a commercial and fishery harbour located in Ampara District, Eastern Province, Sri Lanka. The port was opened on 1 September 2013, its construction having begun in 2008 under the Nagenahira Navodaya programme.

It covers a land area of 60 ha (148 acres) in the first stage and 105 ha (259 acres) in the second stage. The harbour basin covers an area of 16 ha (40 acres) of the sea and spreads 1.2 km (1 mi) along the coast line. Simultaneously, the commercial harbour has enough depth to handle ships up to 5,000 metric tons and the fishery harbour can hold more than 250 fishing boats.

The Port Authority, Naval Ministry and the Ministry of Fisheries launched a project to upgrade the harbour to accommodate larger fishing vessels in 2015.
