= Koolair Power Station =

Kankesanthurai Power Station
- Country: Sri Lanka
- Location: Kankesanthurai
- Coordinates: 9°48′40″N 80°02′07″E
- Status: Decommissioned
- Construction began: 1996
- Commission date: 4 November 1998
- Decommission date: 2009
- Operator: Koolair Ventures Power

Thermal power station
- Primary fuel: Fuel oil

Power generation
- Nameplate capacity: 19.4 MW
- Annual net output: 56 GWh (2005)

The Kankesanthurai Power Station (also commonly referred to as the Koolair Power Station) was a fuel oil-run thermal power station which was commissioned as part of the urgent plan by the Ceylon Electricity Board to overcome the 1990s power crisis. Construction of the power station began in August 1998, and the power station was commissioned three months later on 4 November 1998 in Kankesanthurai, in the Jaffna Peninsula of Sri Lanka. It was the biggest power station in the Jaffna region, at that time.

Despite having an original installed capacity of 19.4 MW, the power station had mostly operated in the 8-15 MW range due to conflict damage caused by artillery fire to the plant (and neighbouring Kankesanthurai Cement Factory) in May 2000. The operators were unable to repair the damage due to the insurance company rejecting the claim, stating that it was due to war, and not due to terrorism for which it was originally insured for.

== History ==
The plant equipment was imported in 1996 and initially commissioned in Ethul Kotte (in January 1997) and Malabe (in 1998) as separate power stations with capacities of 11.2 MW and 8.2 MW.

Due to the protests and complaints against the high levels of noise of up to 100dB caused by the operation of the Kotte Power Station in the residential area, it was transferred 400 km (250 mi) to its final location at Kankesanthurai in the Jaffna District, in August 1998. The plant operated only for three months in Kotte - generating a total of 9 GWh prior to transfer.

The Malabe Power Station too faced similar concerns about noise, before changes were made to reduce sound output from 102dB to 49dB. With increasing demand in the Jaffna Peninsula, the facility too was subsequently shifted from Malabe in December 1999, to the newly created facility in Kankesanthurai. Seventeen generators were relocated in a period of three months.

Electricity generation history (GWh)
	1997	1998	1999	2000	2001	2002	2003	2004	2005	2006	2007	2008	2009
Ethul Kotte Power Station	9	-	-	-	-	-	-	-	-	-	-	-	-
Malabe Power Station	-	18	2	-	-	-	-	-	-	-	-	-	-
Kankesanthurai Power Station	-	2	32	41	55	26	25	37	56	42	19	5	1

== See also ==
- List of power stations in Sri Lanka
