= Sri Lanka Ports Authority =

- Logo of Sri Lanka Ports Authority

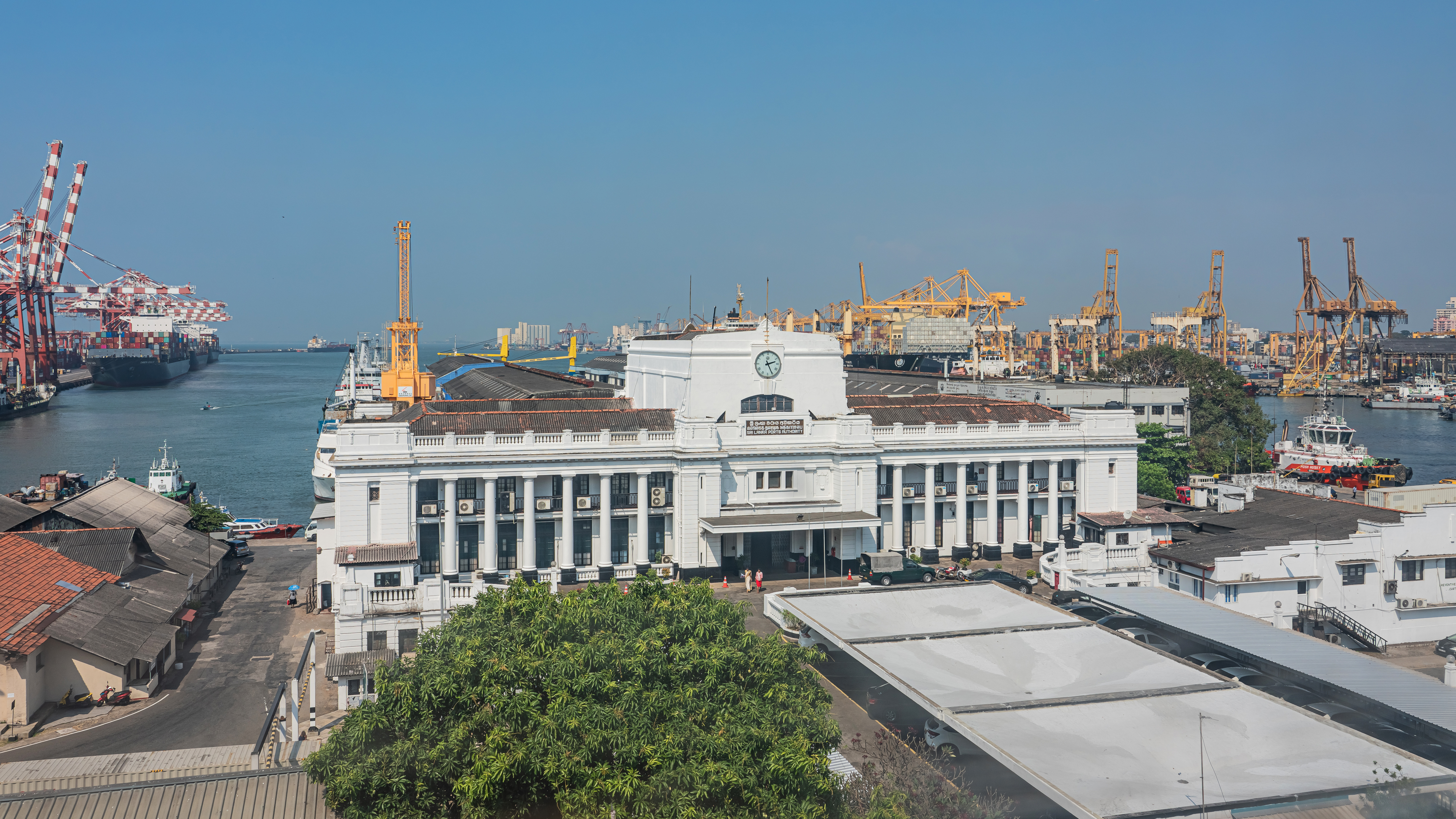
- Headquarters at Colombo Port
- Company type: Government-owned corporation
- Predecessor: Colombo Port Commission; Port (Cargo) Corporation; Port Tally & Protective Services Corporation
- Founded: 1 August 1979
- Headquarters: Colombo, Sri Lanka
- Key people: Admiral Sirimevan Ranasinghe (Rtd) (Chairman); Eng. Herath M.P. Jayawardhana (Vice Chairman); Ganaka Hemachandra (Managing Director)
- Revenue: ▲Rs. 27,805 million (2011); Rs. 25,304 million (2010)
- Operating income: ▲Rs. 8,356 million (2011); Rs. 4,439 million (2010)
- Net income: ▲Rs. 647 million (2011); Rs. -1,032 million (2010)
- Total assets: ▲Rs. 222,709 million (2011); Rs. 203,759 million (2010)
- Total equity: ▲Rs. 87,113 million (2011); Rs. 86,519 million (2010)
- Owner: Government of Sri Lanka
- Number of employees: ▼9,340 (2018); 12,824 (2010)
- Parent: Ministry of Ports and Shipping
- Website: slpa.lk

Sri Lanka Ports Authority (SLPA) is the state-owned operator of major commercial ports in Sri Lanka. Founded in 1979, SLPA currently operates ports in Colombo, Galle, Hambantota, Kankesanthurai, Oluvil, Point Pedro and Trincomalee. As of 31 March 2013 SLPA had a 3% stake in Colombo Dockyard.

== History ==
The Sri Lanka Ports Authority Act No. 51 of 1979 established the SLPA by amalgamating Colombo Port Commission, Port (Cargo) Corporation and Port Tally and Protective Services Corporation. The purpose of SLPA was to develop, maintain, operate and provide port and other services in the ports of Colombo, Galle, Trincomalee and other "specified ports".
