= Northern Power Station (Sri Lanka) =

- Country: Sri Lanka
- Location: Chunnakam
- Coordinates: 9°44′19″N 80°02′04″E
- Status: Operational
- Commission date: 2009
- Construction cost: $35 million (2009)
- Operator: Northern Power Company

Thermal power station
- Primary fuel: Fuel oil

Power generation
- Nameplate capacity: 36 MW

The Northern Power Station, is a 36 MW fuel-oil burning power station built in Chunnakam, Jaffna District, in Sri Lanka. The power station was built after the Northern Power company won a Ceylon Electricity Board tender to urgently set up a power station in the region in response to the 1990s/2000s power crisis. During its operations, the power plant had faced a number of legal cases due to the alleged contamination of water resources in the region.

== See also ==
- Uthuru Janani Power Station
- List of power stations in Sri Lanka
