= Kankesanthurai =

Kankesanthurai காங்கேசன்துறை කන්කසන්තුරේ
- Town
- Location within Northern Province Location within Sri Lanka
- Coordinates: 9°48′55″N 80°02′40″E
- Country: Sri Lanka
- Province: Northern
- District: Jaffna
- DS Division: Valikamam North

Kankesanthurai (Tamil: காங்கேசன்துறை, romanized: kāṅgēsanduṟai, Sinhala: කන්කසන්තුරේ, lit. Port Kankesan), colloquially known as KKS, is a port suburb, fishing division and resort hub of the Jaffna District, Northern Province, Sri Lanka. Formerly an electoral district, Kankesanthurai is home to the Kankesanthurai beach, Keerimalai Naguleswaram temple (a Pancha Ishwaram) and the Maviddapuram Kandaswamy Temple. The port's harbour has served as an arrival and departure point for pilgrims since classical antiquity and is named after the Sri Lankan Tamil god Murukan. Kankesanthurai suburb has many fishing villages and Grama Niladhari (village officers) and is a northern part of Valikamam, one of the three regions of ancient habitation on the Jaffna Peninsula, located on the peninsula's northern coast, 12 miles from Jaffna city, 85 miles from Mannar and 155 miles from Trincomalee.

A popular tourist destination for its temples, its sandy, palm tree filled coastal stretch of beach and the Keerimalai Springs, other prominent landmarks in Kankesanthurai include the suburb's natural harbour, its fort and lighthouse.

== Etymology ==
During the 8th century renovation of the Maviddapuram Kandaswamy Temple by the Chola-Pandyan princess Mathurapuraveeravalli, the temple's statue of Kankesan (Murugan) was brought via the port of Gayathurai which was later renamed Kankesanthurai in his honour. Thurai means "port" in Tamil.

== History ==
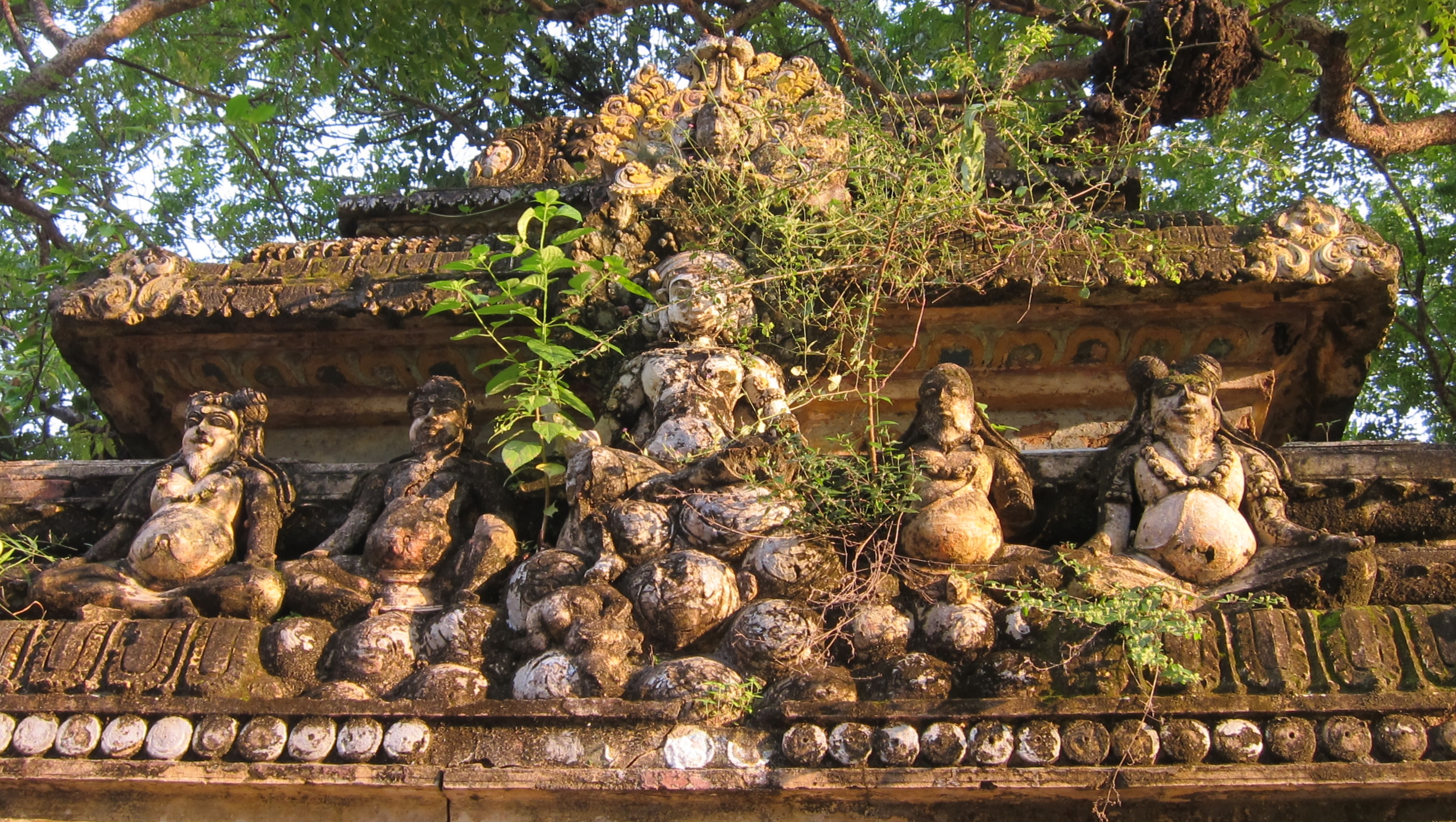
The ancient main gopuram of the Keerimalai Naguleswaram Kovil, Kankesanthurai

During the civil war, the port at Kankesanturai was closed by the Sri Lankan Navy. Between 1983 and 1993, the northern part of the Valikamam region were declared a High Security Zone (HSZ) by the armed forces, where 6000 acres of land was confiscated around Kankesanthurai and all the residents (25,000 Tamil families) expelled, without compensation or return. The temples were inside the HSZ and as a result its priests were evicted by the military. The temple's structures were bombed, most significantly Naguleswaram in 1990, and their contents looted. Between 2002 and 2005, US military intelligence and military personnel visited the security zone, including Jaffna Airport and KKS harbour to review and inspect basing opportunities. Following the end of the civil war the military relaxed some restrictions on entering the HSZ, allowing priests and worshipers to return to the temples. The Maviddapuram Kandaswamy temple's 108-foot gopuram has been re-built but much of its 17th century structural renovations were destroyed during the civil war.

== Historical Sites ==
Naguleswaram temple is a famous Hindu temple of Kankesanthurai. One of the oldest shrines of the region, it is the northernmost shrine on the island of the Pancha Ishwarams of Lord Siva, venerated by Hindus across the world from classical antiquity. Hindus believe its adjacent water tank, the Keerimalai Springs, to have curative properties. Maviddapuram Kandaswamy Temple is towards the south of the harbour.

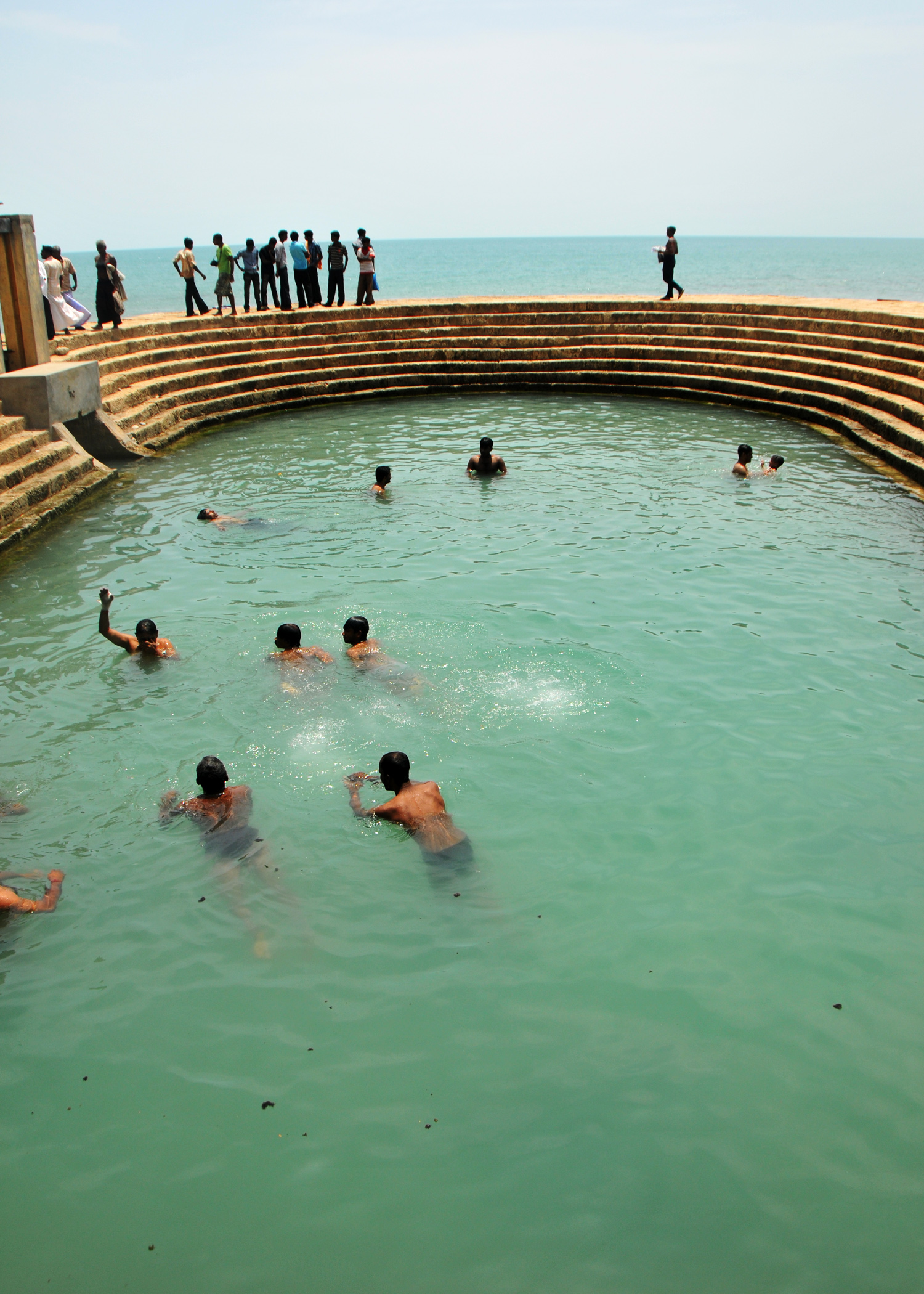
Keerimalai springs, Kankesanthurai

Freshwater at Keerimalai Springs is sourced from underground. "Maasi Magam" and “Aadi Amaavaasai” festival days, the latter falling during the Tamil month of “Aadi” (mid July-mid August) brings Hindu pilgrims to the town to carry out rituals for their forefathers and take a divine dip in the natural springs. These rituals are usually carried out by men. Keerimalai is particularly famous for this festival.

Kankesanthurai fort was a small fort, built by the Dutch in the town. The fort was destroyed sometime after and there are no visible remains. Unlike other Dutch forts in Sri Lanka, there are no maps and little information remaining on the fort.

Kankesanthurai Lighthouse, built in 1893, is 22 metres (72 ft) tall and has an octagonal masonry tower with lantern and gallery. Located deep inside the Sri Lankan military's Valikamam North High Security Zone and next to the naval base, the lighthouse was heavily damaged during the Sri Lankan Civil War and is inactive.

Kankesanthurai beach is acclaimed as one of the top two beaches of the Northern Province. A family-orientated sandy beach with palm trees and cool waters, the beach is non-crowded and natural from where views of the villagers' fisheries at the harbour, medieval architecture and the lighthouse are possible.

== Governance ==
Kankesanthurai was an electoral district of Sri Lanka between August 1947 and February 1989. The district was named after the town. The 1978 Constitution of Sri Lanka introduced the proportional representation electoral system for electing members of Parliament. The existing 160 mainly single-member electoral districts were replaced with 22 multi-member electoral districts. Kankesanthurai electoral district was replaced by the Jaffna multi-member electoral district at the 1989 general elections, the first under the PR system, though Kankesanthurai continues to be a polling division of the multi-member electoral district. Prominent Ceylon Tamil lawyer and politician S. J. V. Chelvanayakam stood as the All Ceylon Tamil Congress (ACTC) candidate for Kankesanthurai at the 1947 parliamentary election. He won the election and entered Parliament.

=== Economy and industry ===
Kankesanturai was the site of fishing and manufacture industry in the 1900s, with the establishment of a cement factory that served the country. The factory commenced operations in 1950 under the Department of Industries and was converted to a Public Corporation in 1956, being named the Kankesan Cement Works. The factory closed its productions in 1991 due to the raging Northern war. In 2016, MPs from the Northern Provincial Council have expressed interest in reviving the plant with a green cement factory concept, using environmentally friendly cement technologies, with Sri Lanka Cement Corporation, the UAE-based Ras Al Khaimah and the South Korean AFKO Group GMEX all linked to invest. Near the cement factory, the Koolair Power Station, a pollutant fuel oil-run thermal power station that was moved to Kankesanthurai following noise complaints elsewhere, was similarly decommissioned following artillery damage during the war.

Banana production, milk production at the yoghurt factory, chilli and onion farming, market trade, hotel administration and boat journeys between Jaffna islets also generate income in the suburb but are all currently run as military businesses that have negatively impacted local enterprise through competitive pricing; The Society for Threatened Peoples notes that profit is returned to the MoD in Sri Lanka which pays soldiers' salaries in KKS.

Underwater shipwrecks have also impeded ship movements within the port's harbour. Under an agreement signed in 2011, India has assisted in dredging the Kankesanthurai harbour to deepen it, remove the wrecks and turn Kankesathurai harbour international.

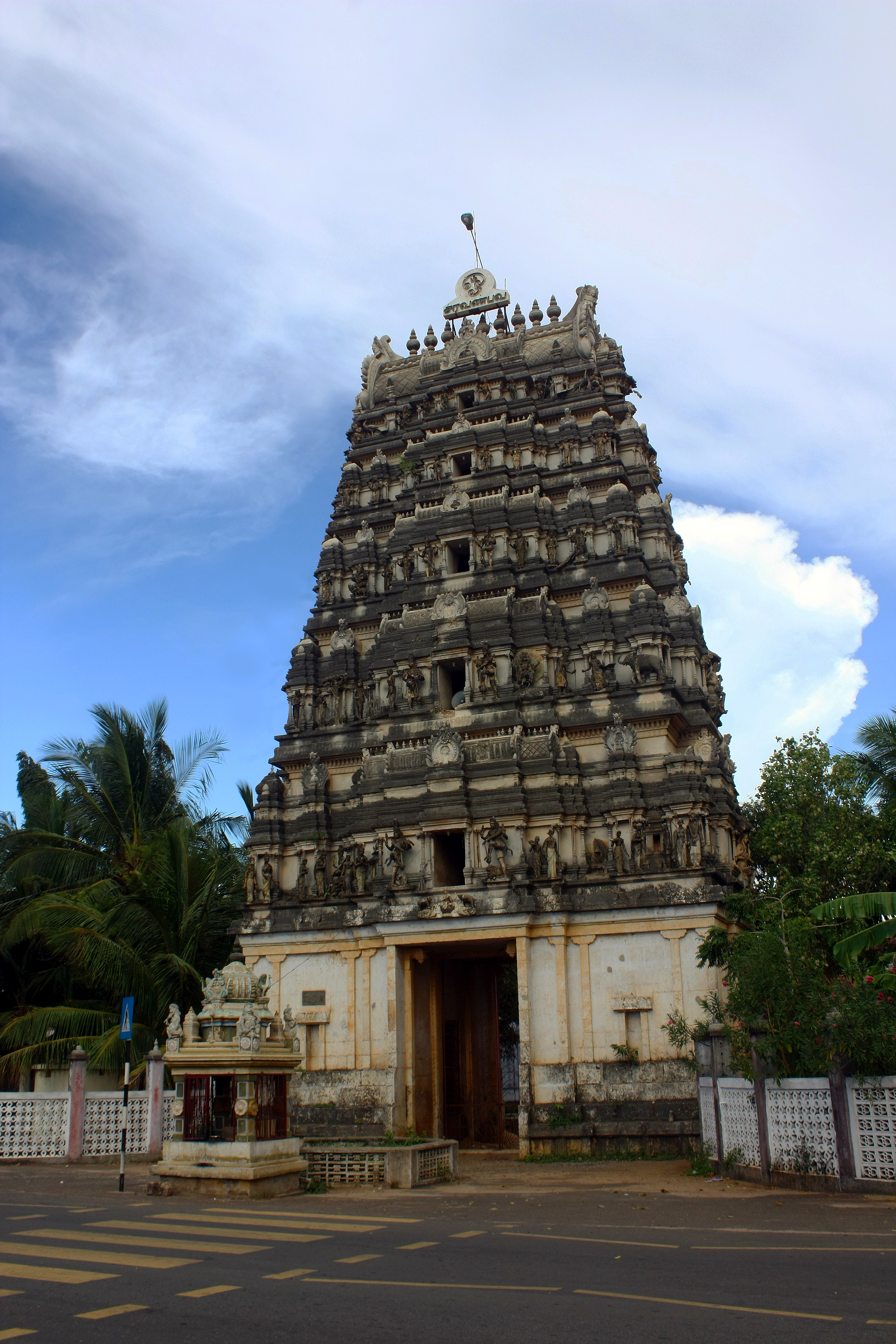
Maviddapuram Kandaswamy Temple, whose eighth century Murukan statue gave the port district its name

== Geography and climate ==
Kankesanthurai is on the north coast of the Jaffna Peninsula, near Point Pedro, the northernmost point in Sri Lanka. Its port is to the north, facing the Bay of Bengal in the Indian Ocean.

The climate of Jaffna peninsula is considered to be tropical monsoonal with a seasonal rhythm of rainfall. The temperature ranges from 26 C to 33 C. Annual precipitation ranges from 696 mm to 1125 mm. The north east monsoon rain (October to January) accounts for more than 90% of the annual rainfall.

== Population ==
A 2007 Department of Census and Statistics government report on population figures in the Jaffna district notes that Kankesanthurai Centre, Kankesanthurai West and Kankesanthurai South, as well as Naguleswaram and Maviddapuram are "High Security Zones" where there are no civilians. By 2012, some return of internally displaced people and civilian life in the Valikamam North DS division was documented by the Northern Provincial Council in their statistics report, detailing dry ration issues, mine injuries and welfare centres in Kankesanthurai.

== Transport ==
=== Rail ===
Kankesanthurai railway station is the terminus of the Northern Line on the Sri Lanka Railways network. Until 1990, Kankesanthurai was the terminus of the Yal Devi service. During the war, trains terminated at Vavuniya, leaving Kankesanthurai isolated from the national railway network. Kankesanthurai railway station was re opened in early 2015 and is functioning at present.

=== Port ===
The Port at Kankesanturai was closed during the war. In 2011, India and Sri Lanka signed an agreement to revive the port by clearing sunken ships and deepening the harbour. This should significantly lower the transit time of goods to and from the east coast of India, Bangladesh, and Myanmar, and propel economic activity in the north. In October 2023 ferry service between the Kankesanturai Port and Nagapattinam, Tamil Nadu, began. The HSC Cheriyapani carries up to 150 passengers between India and Sri Lanka, making one round trip per day.

=== Air ===
Jaffna International Airport (IATA: JAF, ICAO: VCCJ) is an air force base and international airport in Palaly in northern Sri Lanka near Kankesanthurai. Located approximately 16 km (9.9 miles) north of the city of Jaffna, the airport is also known as Palaly Airport and SLAF Palaly. Originally built by the Royal Air Force during World War II, it served as the country's second international airport before being taken over by the Sri Lanka Air Force. Jaffna International Airport is the 3rd international airport in Sri Lanka after Bandaranaike International Airport in Colombo and Mattala Rajapaksa International Airport in Hambantota.

== Education ==
- Kankesanthurai Nadeswara College

== See also ==
- List of ports in Sri Lanka
- Railway stations in Sri Lanka
