= Moira (1813 ship) =

History

United Kingdom
- Name: Moira
- Owner: EIC voyage 1:William Hornblow; EIC voyages 2-4:Henry Templer; 1835:Somes; 1838:Owens & Co.
- Builder: Matthew Smith, Calcutta
- Launched: 23 October 1813
- Fate: Lost in late 1843 or 1844

General characteristics
- Tons burthen: 624, or 642, or 64990/94, or 650 (bm)
- Length: 129 ft 3 in (39.4 m)
- Beam: 33 ft 8 in (10.3 m)
- Propulsion: Sail

Moira (or occasionally, Earl of Moira), was launched at Calcutta in 1813. Between 1820 and 1834 she made four voyages for the British East India Company (EIC) under voyage charters, and transported troops to Burma in 1824. She was lost in 1844.

== Career ==
Moira first appeared in the Register of Shipping in 1816. Her master was Kemp, her owner Bonham, and her trade London–India.

Moira was at Saugor on 1 April 1817. There she took on elements of the 66th Regiment of Foot, which was transferring to St Helena. The headquarters embarked on Dorah, and the remainder of the regiment travelled on Catherine Griffith. Moira and Catherine Griffiths arrived towards the end of June but Dorah was delayed and did not arrive until 5 July. The Regiment disembarked on 18 July. Catherine Griffith, Dorah, and Moira sailed on to England and brought with them the 53rd Regiment of Foot, which the 66th had replaced. They arrived in September. Moira arrived at Deal on 28 September.

=== EIC voyage #1 (1820–1821) ===
The EIC chartered Moira on 10 January 1820 for one voyage at a rate of £11/ton. Captain William Hornblow sailed from The Downs on 21 April, bound for Madras and Bengal. Moira was at Rio de Janeiro on 11 June, and arrived at Calcutta on 1 October. Homeward bound, she was at Saugor on 30 December and Madras on 5 January 1821. On 27 January, "Earl of Moira", Hornblow, master, was driven between the Little Basses, where she grounded. She lost her rudder but got off. On 31 January, in attempting to sail between the Great and Little Basses with a temporary rudder, she again grounded. She was gotten off and sailed on to Bombay. She arrived at Bombay on 25 March. She reached St Helena on 5 August and arrived at The Downs on 30 September.

=== First Anglo-Burmese War ===
In 1824 Moira was one of the transports belonging to the first division of the Madras Force participating in the First Anglo-Burmese War. On 2 September officers and men from Moira helped crew the gunboats during an attack up Dalla Creek. Brigadier-General Sir Archibald Campbell, the commander of the Burma Expedition noted that "the officers and crew of the transport ship Moira are volunteers on every occasion when the enemy is likely to be met with." In the attack on Martaban about a month later, one of the few British casualties was a seaman from Moira, who was seriously wounded. Captain Hornblow not only commanded Moira, but was also agent for the EIC's vessels in the first division. He was mentioned in dispatches for his zeal in his duties. The crew came in for praise for their good conduct while manning the mortar boat.

=== EIC voyage #2 (1828-1829) ===
The EIC chartered Moira on 9 April 1828 for one voyage at a rate of £9 9s/ton. Captain Robert Thornhill sailed from The Downs on 7 July, bound for Bengal. Moira arrived at Calcutta on 29 November. Homeward bound, she was at Kedgeree on 15 January 1829 and Madras on 4 February. She reached St Helena on 25 April, and arrived at The Downs on 20 June.

=== EIC voyage #3 (1831-1832) ===
The EIC chartered Moira for one voyage on 29 July 1831 for £8 13s/ton. Captain Samuel Beadle sailed from The Downs on 12 August, bound for Bengal. Moira arrived at Calcutta on 4 December. Homeward bound, she was at Saugor on 2 March 1832, reached St Helena on 16 May, and arrived at The Downs on 9 July.

=== EIC voyage #4 (1833-1834) ===
The EIC chartered Moira for one voyage on 17 April 1833 at a rate of £8 19s 11d/ton. Captain Thomas Alexander Johnson sailed from The Downs on 9 June, bound for China and Halifax, Nova Scotia. Moira reached Surabaya on 6 October, and arrived at Whampoa Anchorage on 7 February 1834. Bound for Canada, she crossed the Second Bar on 17 March, reached the Cape of Good Hope on 26 June, and arrived at Halifax on 17 October.

=== Later career ===
Between 1834 and 1835 the EIC ceased its maritime activities. Although it did not own Moira, Henry Templer sold her to J.Somes. In 1838 her master became Owen and her owner Owen & Co. Throughout this period her trade remained London–Calcutta or India. In 1839 she had damage repaired. This information continued to her last listing in Lloyd's Register, which was in 1843.

On 25 June 1840 Moira was at Madras when a newly joined sailor who intended to work his way to Calcutta, started to behave in a mutinous manner, inciting the rest of the crew to refuse to follow orders. Captain Samuel Owen was ill and so couldn't go onshore. He asked the magistrates to come to Moira and conduct a hearing. Captain C. Biden, the Beach Magistrate and Master Attendant came on board and conducted the hearing. He reprimanded the 4th Officer for having engaged in unofficerly conduct while Moira was in Madras Roads. He then had the ringleader and two other men taken ashore as prisoners. On 26 June the police magistrate sentenced the ringleader to three dozen lashes and two months in prison. The other two men taken ashore received sentences of one month in prison, on half rations, with one man also forfeiting his wages and clothes.

== Fate ==
Moira foundered on a voyage to India in September 1843. She departed from Chusan, China for Hong Kong. No further trace, presumed foundered with the loss of all hands.
