= Round Island Light =

Round Island Light may refer to:

- Round Island Light, Isles of Scilly, England, UK
- Round Island Light, Michigan, U.S.
- Round Island Light, Mississippi, U.S.
- Round Island Light, Sri Lanka
