= Mannar Island Lighthouse (new) =

Talaimannar Lighthouse
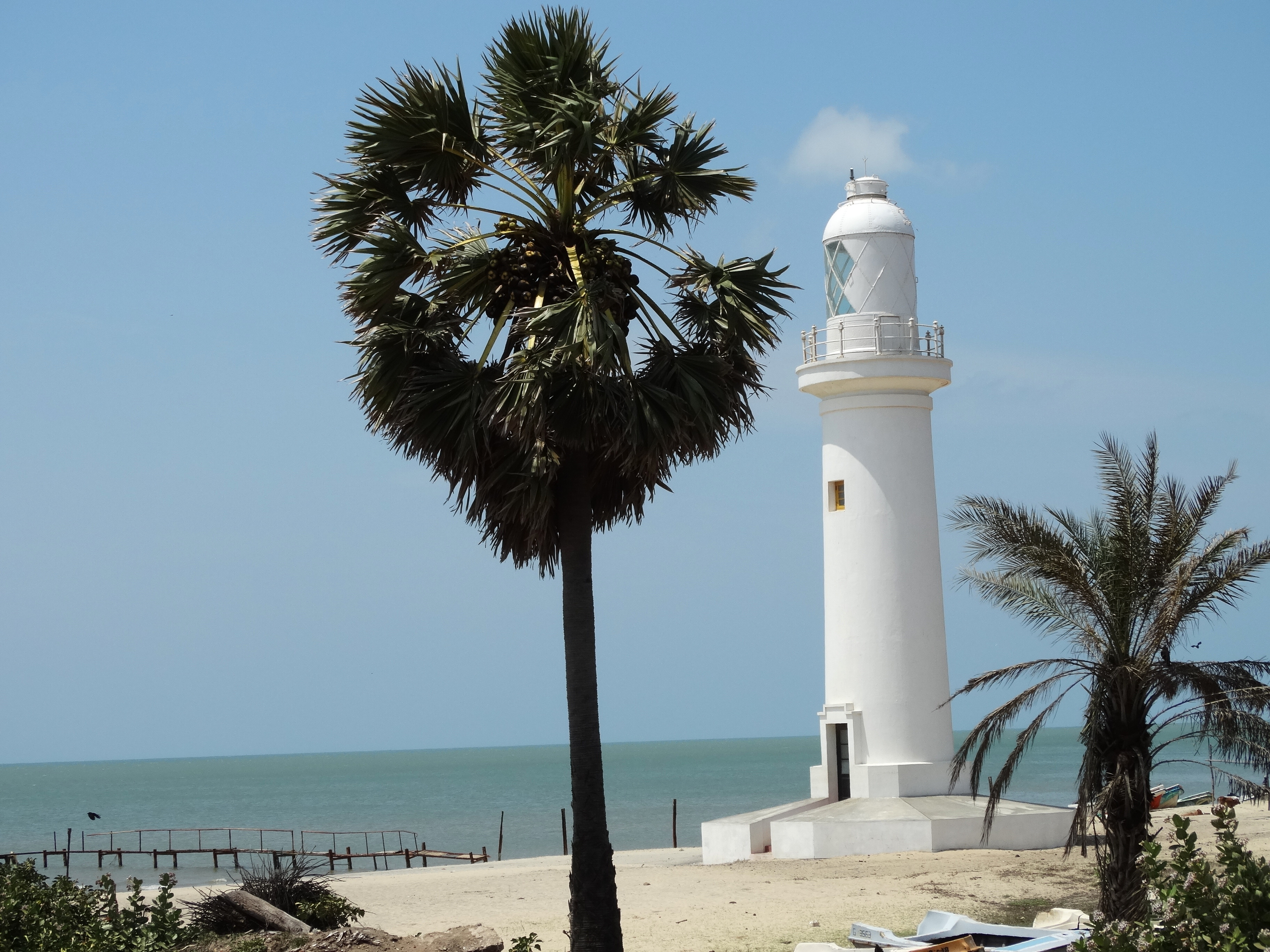
- Mannar Island Lighthouse in 2014
- Location: Mannar Island, Talaimannar, Sri Lanka
- Coordinates: 9°06′25″N 79°43′52″E

Tower
- Constructed: 1915
- Construction: rubble masonry (tower)
- Height: 19 m (62 ft)
- Shape: cylindrical tower with balcony and lantern
- Markings: white (tower, lantern)

Light
- Focal height: 17 m (56 ft)
- Range: 10 nmi (19 km; 12 mi)
- Characteristic: Fl W 5s

Mannar Island Lighthouse is a lighthouse in Talaimannar on Mannar Island in northern Sri Lanka. Built in 1915, the 19 metres (62 ft) white lighthouse has a round cylindrical tower with lantern and gallery.

== See also ==
- Mannar Island Lighthouse (old)
- List of lighthouses in Sri Lanka
