= Dondra Head Lighthouse =

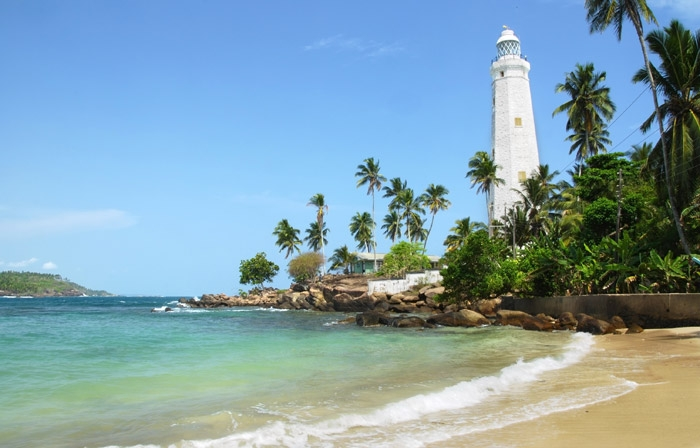
- Dondra Head lighthouse
- Location: Dondra Head; Southern Province; Sri Lanka
- Coordinates: 5°55′16.71″N 80°35′38.73″E

Tower
- Constructed: 1890
- Construction: brick tower
- Height: 49 m (161 ft)
- Shape: octagonal tower with balcony and lantern
- Markings: white tower, yellow windows
- Power source: mains electricity
- Operator: Sri Lanka Ports Authority

Light
- Focal height: 47 metres (154 ft)
- Lens: hyperradiant Fresnel lens
- Range: 28 nautical miles (52 km; 32 mi)
- Characteristic: Fl W 5s.

Dondra Head Lighthouse is a lighthouse located on Dondra Head, Dondra, the southernmost point in Sri Lanka and is Sri Lanka's tallest lighthouse, and also one of the tallest in South East Asia. Dondra Head lighthouse is operated and maintained by the Sri Lanka Ports Authority.

The lighthouse is near the village of Dondra, and is approximately six kilometres (3 1/2 miles) southeast of Matara. The name Dondra is a synonym for "Devi-Nuwara" in the local Sinhala language, "Devi" meaning "Gods" and "Nuwara" meaning "City". Dondra is therefore derived to mean "City of the Gods".

== History ==
Dondra Head Lighthouse was designed by Sir James Nicholas Douglass, with construction, by William Douglass of the Imperial Lighthouse Service, commencing in November 1887. All the building materials including the bricks and steel were imported from England. The granite rock was supplied from quarries at Dalbeattie in Scotland and Penryn in Cornwall. The lighthouse was completed and commissioned in March 1890. The combined cost of erection of the lighthouse and the Barberyn Lighthouse was £30,000 and was paid for by dues collected at the Basses lighthouses.

=== Lens ===
Dondra Head was one of a limited number of lighthouses that were designed to house the large Hyperradiant Fresnel lenses that became available at the end of the 19th century. Four of these lenses were used in Sri Lankan lights, all made by Chance Brothers in England.

The rotating lens however was removed in 2020 and replaced by a static flashing LED light which has reduced the visibility range of the lighthouse considerably.

== Features ==
The lighthouse is 49 m (161 ft) high and contains 7 floors, 14 two panel yellow colour windows and 196 steps to the top. Dondra Head is also one of four international lighthouse in Sri Lanka. It was modernized in 2000, with the introduction of a Differential Global Positioning System and is computer linked to the other major lighthouses around the coast.

== See also ==
- List of lighthouses in Sri Lanka
