= List of lighthouses in Sri Lanka =

This is a list of lighthouses in Sri Lanka. There are 14 active lighthouses in Sri Lanka. Most of the lighthouses in Sri Lanka are operated and maintained by the Sri Lanka Ports Authority (SLPA). However several are operated by the Sri Lanka Navy, while some are inactive.

== History ==
Most of the lighthouses in Sri Lanka were built during the British rule of the country (then known as Ceylon). These were operated and maintained by the Imperial Lighthouse Service, however some lighthouses had keepers sent from Trinity House. After Sri Lanka gained independence the operation of the lighthouses was taken over by the Navy on a piecemeal basis with the completion of transfer by 1976. There are twenty five lighthouses in Sri Lanka, with sixteen of those being still active. Most of these lighthouses now fall under the control of Sri Lanka Ports Authority, whilst the remainder are under the control of the Sri Lanka Navy.

There are four international lighthouses, they are:

1. Barberyn (Beruwala) Lighthouse
2. Dondra Head Lighthouse
3. Little Basses Reef Lighthouse
4. Great Basses Reef Lighthouse

== Lighthouses ==
Name	Image	Year built	Location & coordinates	Class of Light	Focal height	NGA number	ARLHS number	Range nml
Barberyn Lighthouse		1890	Beruwala; 6°27′48.5″N 79°58′05.7″E	Fl W 20s.	46 metres (151 ft)	27288	SLI-002	27
Batticaloa Lighthouse		1913	Batticaloa; 7°45′17.2″N 81°41′07.8″E	Fl W 3s.	27 metres (89 ft)	27260	SLI-003	10
Chapel Hill Lighthouse		n/a	Trincomalee District; 8°32′52.3″N 81°14′39.4″E	Fl W 10s.	111 metres (364 ft)	27248	SLI-004	10
Colombo Lighthouse		1952	Colombo; 6°56′10.8″N 79°50′27.0″E	Fl (3) W 10s.	26 metres (85 ft)	27336	SLI-005	25
Colombo Island Breakwater North End Lighthouse	Image	1907	Colombo Harbour; 6°57′39.2″N 79°51′04.7″E	Fl G 3s.	13 metres (43 ft)	27320	SLI-006	10
Colombo Island Breakwater South End Lighthouse	Image	1905	Colombo Harbour; 6°57′18.9″N 79°50′49.0″E	Fl R 3s.	13 metres (43 ft)	27316	SLI-007	10
Dondra Head Lighthouse		1889	Dondra Head; 5°55′16.6″N 80°35′38.8″E	Fl W 5s.	47 metres (154 ft)	27276	SLI-001	28
Foul Point Lighthouse	Image	1863	Trincomalee; 8°31′31.4″N 81°19′07.3″E	inactive	(tower); 32 metres (105 ft)	n/a	SLI-009	n/a
Galle Lighthouse		1939	Galle Fort; 6°01′28.48″N 80°13′09.76″E	Fl (2) W 15s.	28 metres (92 ft)	27284	SLI-018	25
Great Basses Reef Lighthouse		1873	Southern Province; 6°10′55.5″N 81°28′52.8″E	Fl W 15s.	34 metres (112 ft)	27272	SLI-010	25
Hambantota Lighthouse	Image	1913	Hambantota; 6°07′19.2″N 81°07′37.6″E	inactive	(tower); 14 metres (46 ft)	n/a	SLI-011	n/a
Jaffna Channel Lighthouse		n/a	9°37′37.2″N 80°01′58.0″E	Fl (3) W 15s.	6 metres (20 ft)	27220	n/a	13
Kankesanthurai Lighthouse	Image	1893	Kankesanthurai; 9°48′57.9″N 80°02′41.4″E	inactive	(tower); 22 metres (72 ft)	ex-27224	SLI-012	n/a
Kovilan Point Lighthouse	Image	1916	Karainagar; 9°45′42.4″N 79°51′47.9″E	inactive	31 metres (102 ft)	27212	SLI-013	11
Little Basses Reef Lighthouse	Image	1878	Southern Province; 6°24′26.3″N 81°43′48.8″E	V Q (2) W 10s.	34 metres (112 ft)	27268	SLI-014	27
Mannar Island New Lighthouse		1915	Talaimannar; 9°06′26.8″N 79°43′51.8″E	Fl W 5s.	17 metres (56 ft)	27364	SLI-015	10
Mannar Island Old Lighthouse		1915	Talaimannar; 9°05′37.85″N 79°41′53.8″E	n/a	n/a	n/a	n/a	n/a
Mullaitivu Lighthouse		1896	Mullaitivu; 9°17′26.9″N 80°48′38.35″E	destroyed 1996; Fl (2) W 10s.	20 metres (66 ft)	27232	SLI-016	10
Old Colombo Lighthouse		1860	Colombo; 6°56′05.2″N 79°50′34.3″E	inactive since 1952	(tower); 29 metres (95 ft)	n/a	SLI-021	n/a
Oluvil Lighthouse		1999	7°17′25.4″N 81°52′02.2″E	Fl W 10s.	25 metres (82 ft)	n/a	SLI-026	n/a
Point Pedro Lighthouse		1916	Point Pedro; 9°49′36.8″N 80°14′59.1″E	Fl W 5s.	31 metres (102 ft)	27228	SLI-017	10
ILavalai Light House	[	1916	ILavalai; 9°49′36.8″N 80°14′59.1″E	Fl W 5s.	31 metres (102 ft)	27228	SLI-017	10
Pungudutivu Lighthouse		n/a	Pungudutivu Lighthouse; 9°34′04.1″N 79°51′14.7″E	Fl W 5s.	11 metres (36 ft)	27216	n/a	11
Round Island Lighthouse		1863	Trincomalee; 8°30′46.8″N 81°13′33.3″E	Fl (3) WR 15s.	31 metres (102 ft)	27244	SLI-019	10
Sangamankanda Point Lighthouse	Image	1947	7°01′32.8″N 81°52′40.7″E	Fl W 5s.	7.5 metres (25 ft)	27264	SLI-020	10

== See also ==
- Lists of lighthouses and lightvessels
