= William Douglass (engineer, born 1831) =

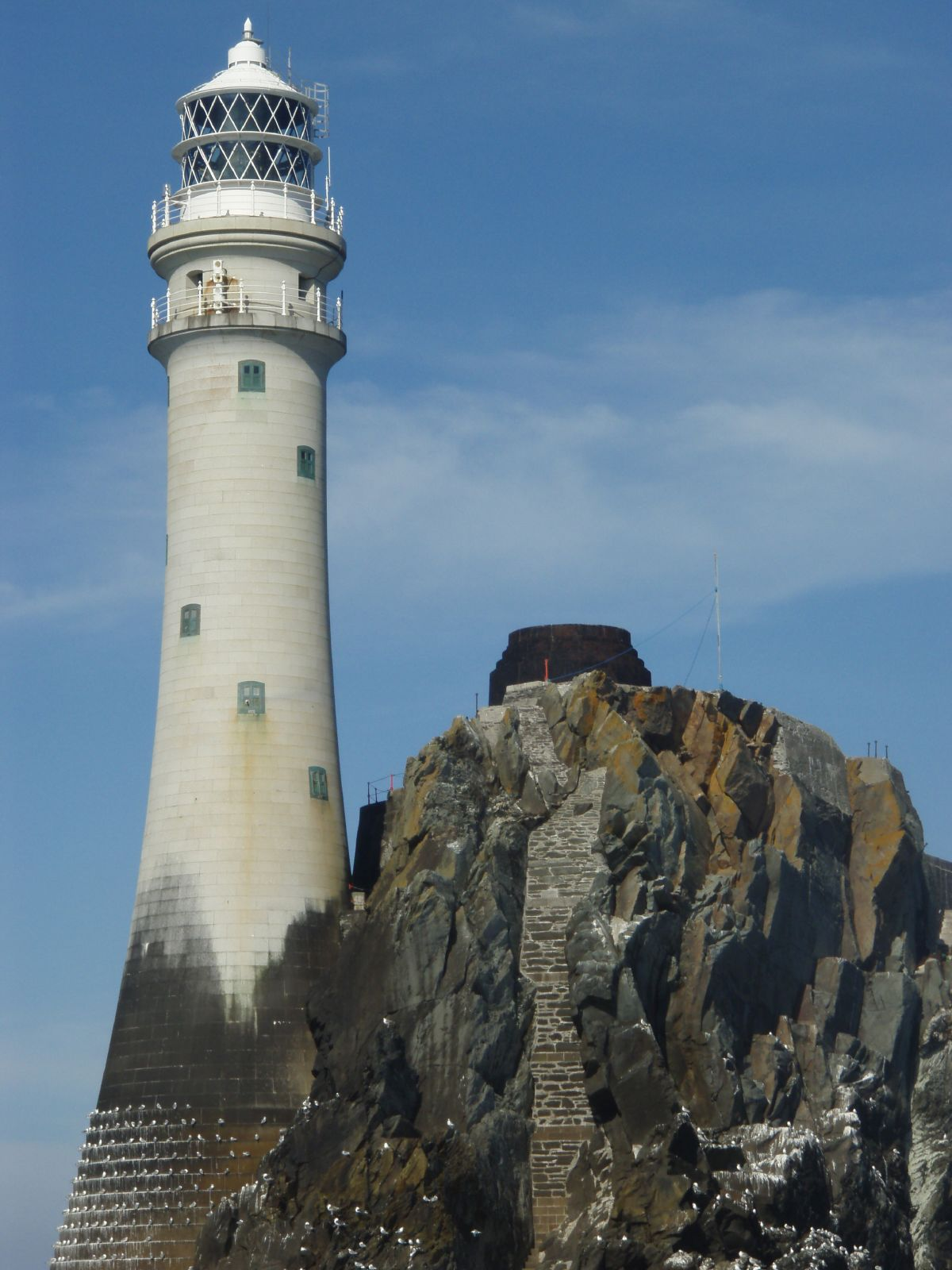
The second Fastnet Rock Lighthouse designed by Douglass

William Douglass (1831 – 10 March 1923) was for twenty-six years an engineer for Trinity House and engineer-in-chief to the Commissioners of Irish Lights from 1878 to 1900. He built a number of offshore lighthouses and was responsible for the design of the second Fastnet Rock lighthouse.

== Early life ==
His father was Nicholas Douglass, who in 1839 was engaged by Trinity House in London as a constructive engineer, rising in the course of time to be its superintending engineer. His two sons, James and William, would accompany their father to his place of work from an early age.

William, born in London, was apprenticed to Robert Stevenson, Civil Engineer working for the Northern Lighthouse Board. In 1847 Mr Nicholas Douglass was selected by his employers, Trinity House, to erect the first lighthouse on the Bishop Rock on the Isles of Scilly. The first attempt, designed by the engineer-in-chief, James Walker, decided on a 120-foot-tall (37 m) tower comprising accommodation and a light on top of iron legs, but it was swept away in a storm in 1850. In the second attempt, James Walker changed to building a stone structure, starting in 1851. James Douglass had been his father's assistant but desired to join a firm on the Tyne to gain additional experience, so in 1852 William was appointed in his stead, and the lighthouse was completed in 1858 without loss of life.

== Engineering ==
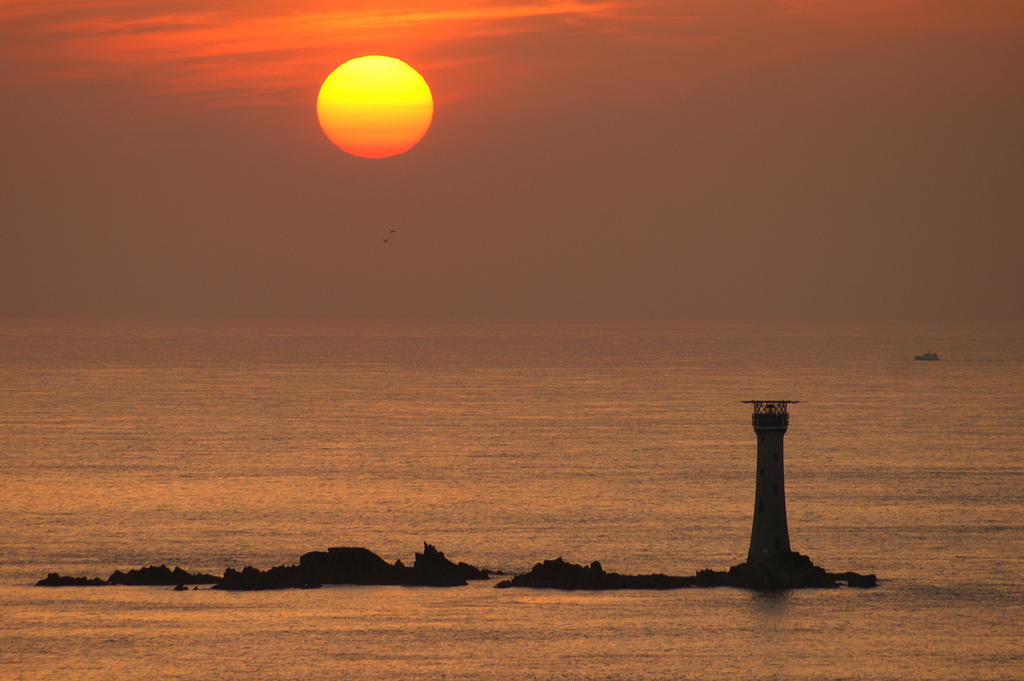
Les Hanois Lighthouse off Guernsey

In October 1859 William was appointed as resident engineer on a new project, Les Hanois Lighthouse on rocks off the south-west coast of Guernsey. The 118 ft (36 m) tower design by James Walker encompassed the basic design shape created by Robert Stevenson, with amendments to incorporate suggestions by his father, Nicholas Douglass, to make the stones lock together using dovetail joints on the horizontal and vertical; the first time this method had been tried. It was noted that William commanded the "unbounded confidence" of his working parties, his "courage and resources being equal to every emergency". William proved to be an inspiring and inspired choice as the resident engineer. A grand stone-laying ceremony took place on 14 August 1860 before a large crowd on local boats. The light was turned on in November 1862 with the tower commissioned in August 1863. The cost amounting to £25,296.

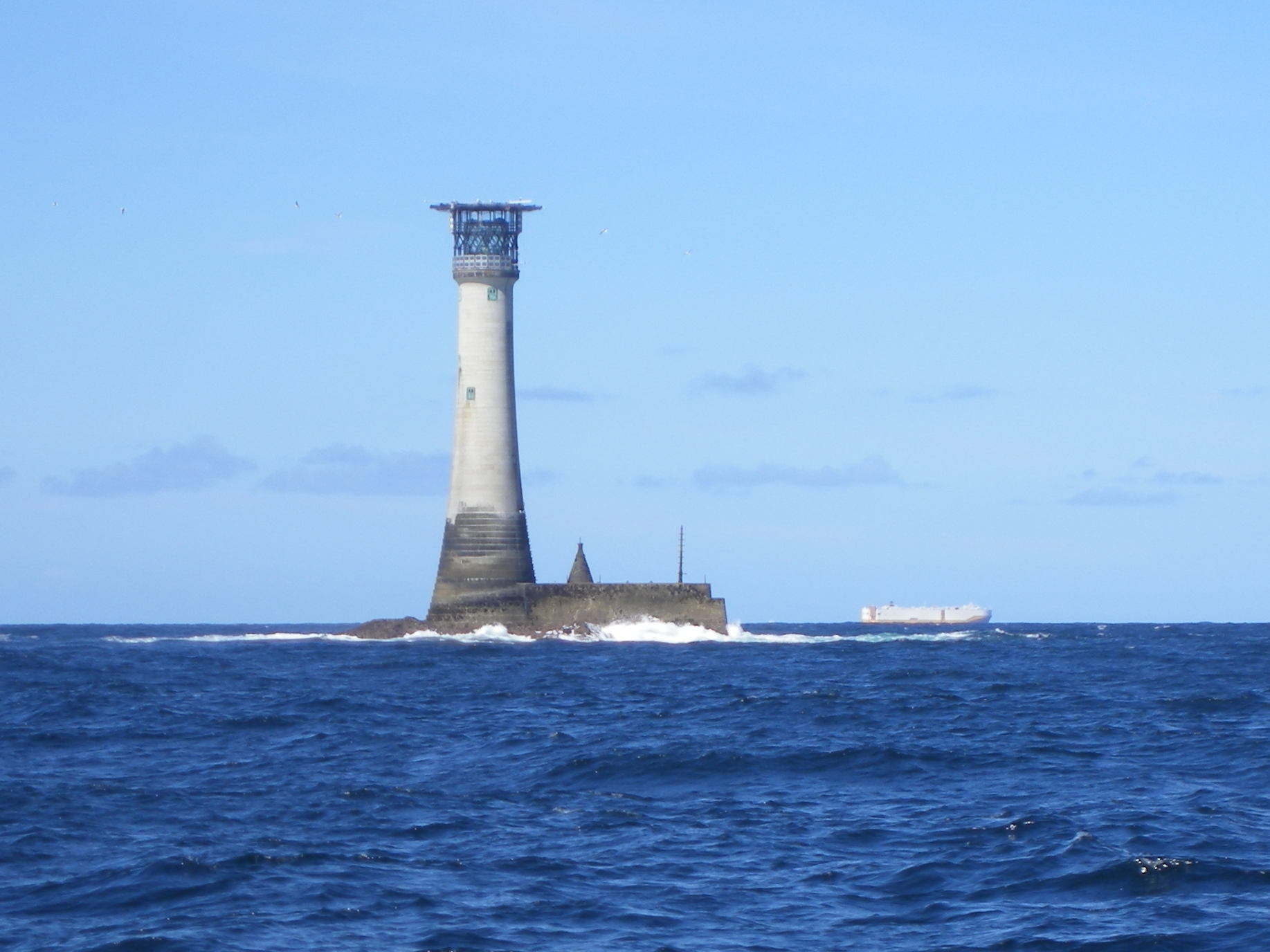
Wolf Rock Lighthouse off Land's End

James Douglass, the brother of William, was at that time engaged in building the 135-foot-tall (41 m) Wolf Rock Lighthouse off Land's End when James Walker died, and James was appointed as the new engineer-in-chief to Trinity House. William was called in to continue the work near the Isles of Scilly. Continuing his system of being the first to land, the last to leave and ensuring safety lines were fastened to each man William, who was a strong swimmer, worked on the lighthouse, on one occasion risking his life to steer a boat in storm seas close to the partly-built lighthouse so that supplies could be delivered to the men stranded on the rock. Completed on 19 July 1869, the light was first lit in January 1870.

George Robert Stephenson (a future President of the Institution of Civil Engineers, and a member of the firm of Robert Stephenson & Co.) commented: "I have passed the Wolf Rock many times under great trepidation. I know of no site or position for a lighthouse which required more skill, or involved more difficulties and dangers, than was the case with the Wolf Rock structure."

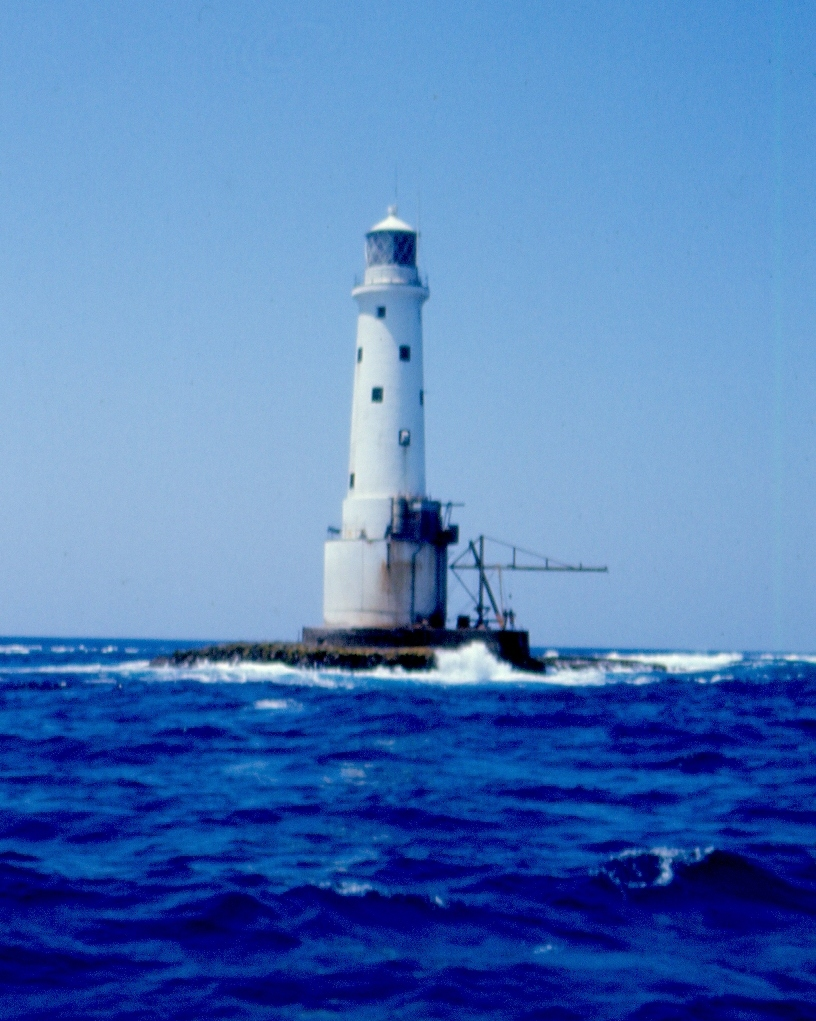
Great Basses Reef Lighthouse

The next project was the Great Basses Reef Lighthouse, designed by brother James, William was appointed executive engineer and set sail to Ceylon to work on the 121-foot-tall (37 m) lighthouse, arriving in December 1869. Two steam ships, each capable of carrying 120 tonnes of stone and equipped with lifting gear for the 2–3 ton stones arrived and the first stone, which had been quarried in Scotland, was laid in December 1870. By late 1872 the masonry was complete and the light installed in March 1873. The cost amounted to £63,000 of which £40,000 had been expended to no result before Trinity House was involved. William was praised for his courage and ability.

A similar tower was requested for the Little Basses Reef Lighthouse, and using the same ships, crews and workers a second tower was constructed by William which became operational in 1878.

Having completed twenty-six years' service with Trinity House, in 1878 William left to become the engineer-in-chief to the Commissioners of Irish Lights where he took over work in progress, introducing new technology to improved fog systems, the oil burners and built gas-burning lamps, rebuilding a number of lighthouses; the largest project being the new Fastnet Rock lighthouse from 1896 which William designed, using the skills he had first learned with Les Hanois Lighthouse. He spent time on the rock supervising the first stones, but his health deteriorated and in 1900 he resigned with the tower still incomplete.

== Personal life ==
At Penzance, in 1868, William Douglass married Jane, daughter of Henry Hodge, of St Levan. Two sons and two daughters survived, the two sons both joined the army, one served in the Royal Army Medical Corps, the other the Royal Engineers. On retirement William settled in Penzance where he would live for a further twenty-two years. In 1914, concerned about the submarine menace, he designed a method to bomb submarines, which he sent to the Admiralty. He died on 10 March 1923.

== Work ==
- Les Hanois Lighthouse 1859–1863
- Wolf Rock Lighthouse 1863–1869
- Great Basses Reef Lighthouse 1869–1873
- Little Basses Reef Lighthouse 1874–1878
- Ireland 1878–1900
  - Mew Island Lighthouse (Copeland Islands) 1882–1884
  - Fastnet Rock Lighthouse 1896–1900
  - Blackhead Lighthouse 1899–1900 (Completed in 1902)
