= Catherine Griffith (1812 ship) =

Merchant ship 1812–1818

History

United States
- Name: Catherine Griffith
- Launched: 1812
- Captured: 1813

United Kingdom
- Name: Catherine Griffith
- Owner: John Short
- Acquired: 1813 by purchase of a prize
- Fate: Wrecked May 1818

General characteristics
- Tons burthen: 441 (bm)

Catherine Griffith (or Catherine Griffiths) was built in New York in 1812. The British captured her in 1813. Her new owner retained her name. After 1814, she traded with India and South East Asia under a license from the British East India Company (EIC). She was wrecked in 1818, outward bound on a voyage to Valparaiso.

== Career ==
Catherine Griffiths was built in New York and reportedly captured in 1813. John Short purchased her as a prize and retained her name.

One of the first mentions of her was a report in Lloyd's List that Catherine Griffiths, Thatcher, master, was one of several vessels that had each lost an anchor in The Downs on 2 November 1813. She had been returning to London from Halifax, Nova Scotia. She arrived at Gravesend four days later.

Lloyd's Register (1818), showed Catherine Griffiths in a list of ships trading with the India under a license from the EIC. It showed her sailing on 15 May 1815, for Batavia with King, master. Her listing in the same issue showed her master as J. Hamilton, changing to A. de Peyster, and her trade as London–India. Catherine Gfiffiths, King, master, arrived at Dover on 17 June 1816, from Batavia.

Catherine Griffiths was at Saugor on 1 April 1817. There she took on elements of the 66th Regiment of Foot, which was transferring to St Helena. The headquarters embarked on Dorah, and the remainder of the regiment travelled on Moira. Moira and Catherine Griffiths arrived towards the end of June but Dorah was delayed and did not arrive until 5 July. The Regiment disembarked on 18 July. Catherine Griffith, Dorah, and Moira sailed on to England and brought with them the 53rd Regiment of Foot, which the 66th had replaced. They arrived in September.

On 17 March 1818, Lloyd's List reported that Catherine Griffiths, de Peyster, master, had returned to the Thames on 15 March. She had been sailing for Valparaiso when another vessel had run into her off the Isle of Wight, causing considerable damage.

== Fate ==
Catherine Griffiths, De Peyster, master, ran aground on 5 May 1818, at Dungeness, Kent, in a thick fog. She was on a voyage from London to Valparaíso, Chile. She was so damaged that she was not expected to be gotten off.

A list of licensed vessels showed her as sailing from England on 17 May 1818, bound for Bombay. The entry carried the annotation "Lost".
