= Dorah (1816 ship) =

History

United Kingdom
- Name: Dorah
- Owner: 1816:F.J.I. Edwards & Co.; 1819:Alexander & Co.
- Builder: Chittagong
- Launched: 1816
- Fate: Wrecked 1821

General characteristics
- Tons burthen: 681, or 690, or 695 (bm)
- Notes: Teak-built

Dorah was launched at Chittagong in 1816. She sailed between India and Britain under a license from the British East India Company until she wrecked in 1821.

== Career ==
Dorah was at Saugor on 1 April 1817. There she took on the headquarters and 300 men of the 66th Regiment of Foot, which was transferring to St Helena. The majority of the regiment travelled on Catherine Griffith and Moira. Moira and Catherine Griffiths arrived towards the end of June but Dorah was delayed. She had run short of water and had had to put in at Port Louis, Mauritius. She did not arrive at St Helena until 5 July. The regiment disembarked on 18 July. Before she arrived at Port Louis a fire broke out aboard Dorah but the soldiers formed a bucket brigade and quickly extinguished it.

Dorah arrived at Plymouth on 23 September. Captain Edwards, her master, had met Napoleon on St Helena and spent two hours with him. Catherine Griffith, Dorah, and Moira brought with them the 53rd Regiment of Foot, which the 66th had replaced.

Dorah, Edwards, master, J. Edwards, owner, sailed from Plymouth back to Calcutta.

On 5 March 1820 Dorah, Aikin, master, put into Mauritius. She had been sailing from Bengal when she was caught in a gale and had to throw 500 bags of rice overboard.

== Fate ==
Dorah, Aikin, master, was wrecked on 4 January 1821 at Table Bay in a hurricane. Her crew was saved.
