= Mullaitivu Lighthouse =

- Location: Northern Province, Sri Lanka
- Coordinates: 9°17′28″N 80°48′40″E

Tower
- Constructed: 1896
- Construction: iron
- Height: 20 m (66 ft)

Light
- Focal height: 20 m (66 ft)
- Range: 10 nmi (19 km; 12 mi)
- Characteristic: Fl(2) W 10s

Mullaitivu Lighthouse was a lighthouse in Mullaitivu in northern Sri Lanka. Built in 1896, the 20 metres (66 ft) lighthouse had an iron skeletal tower. The lighthouse is believed to have been destroyed in 1996/97 during the Sri Lankan Civil War.

== See also ==
- List of lighthouses in Sri Lanka
