= Pungudutivu Lighthouse =

- Location: Pungudutivu; Jaffna District; Northern Province; Sri Lanka
- Coordinates: 09°34′04.1″N 79°51′14.7″E

Tower
- Construction: masonry tower

Light
- Focal height: 11 metres (36 ft)
- Characteristic: Fl W 5s.

Pungudutivu Lighthouse is a lighthouse on the island of Pungudutivu in northern Sri Lanka. The lighthouse is a 15.2 metres (50 ft) square stone block tower.

It is likely that the lighthouse was originally constructed as a survey tower, part of a network of land survey towers erected across the country by the Department of Land Survey in 1857. It is located on the most southern extremity of the island.

== See also ==
- List of lighthouses in Sri Lanka
