= Oluvil Lighthouse =

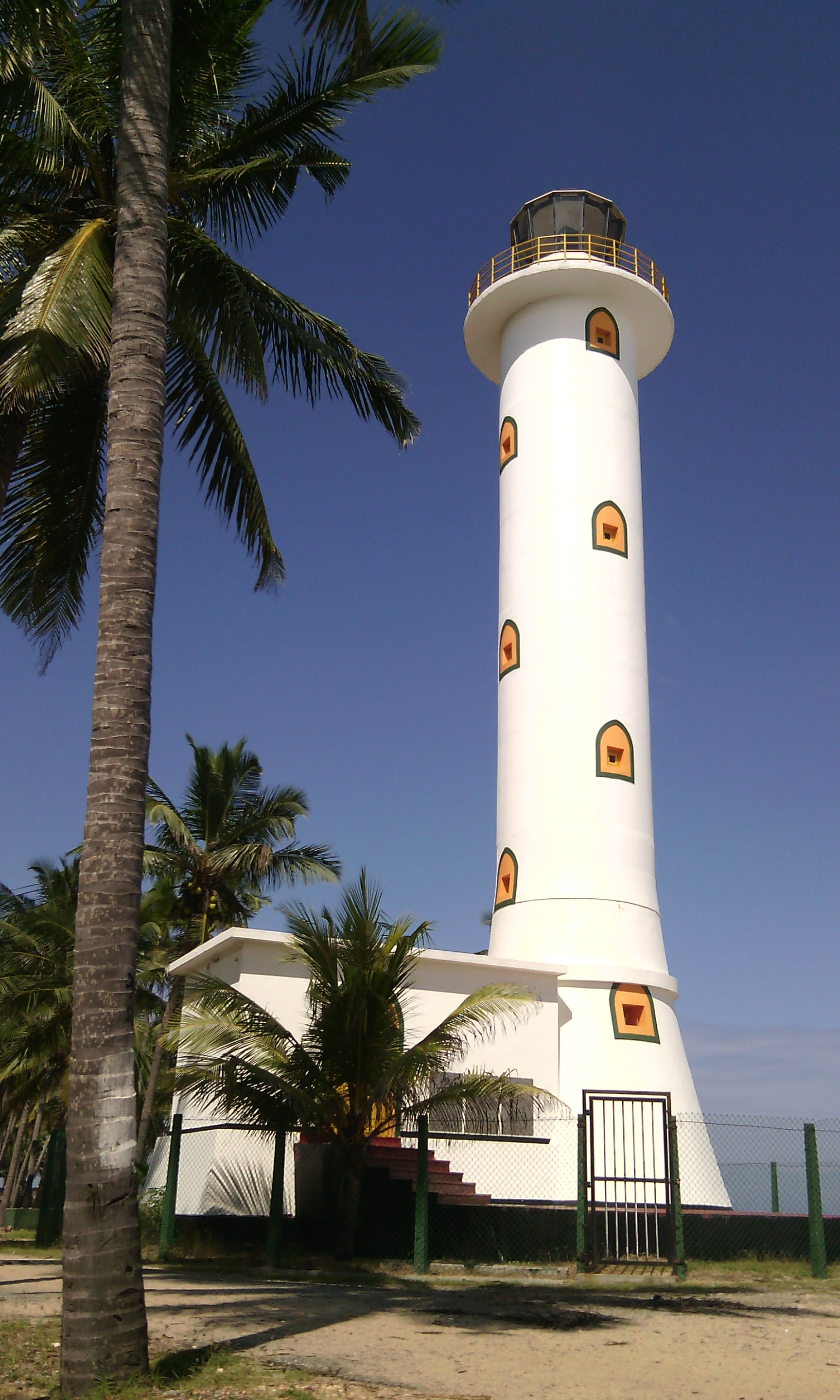
- Location: Oluvil; Ampara District; Sri Lanka
- Coordinates: 07°17′25.5″N 81°52′02.2″E

Tower
- Constructed: 1999
- Construction: concrete tower
- Height: 24 metres (79 ft)
- Shape: cylindrical tower with balcony and lantern
- Markings: white tower and lantern
- Operator: Sri Lanka Ports Authority

Light
- First lit: 1999
- Focal height: 24.9 metres (82 ft)
- Characteristic: Fl W 10s.

Oluvil Lighthouse (Sinhala: ඔලුවිල් ප්‍රදීපාගාරය) is a lighthouse situated on the southern east coast of Sri Lanka at Oluvil, which is located approximately 12 km (7.5 mi) south of Kalmunai.

The lighthouse is operated and maintained by the Sri Lanka Ports Authority. It is the first lighthouse erected after the Sri Lankan independence, until the Hambantota Port and the Colombo Port expansion occurred in 2012–13. The 24 metres (79 ft) high white cylindrical concrete lighthouse tower was built in 1999 as a part of the development of Oluvil Harbour and it was constructed with lantern and gallery, attached to a one-story small equipment building.

The lighthouse was declared open on 19 June 1999 by then Sri Lanka's Minister for Port Development, Rehabilitation and Reconstruction and the Sri Lanka Muslim Congress leader M. H. M. Ashraff.

== 2004 tsunami ==
In 2004, following the Indian Ocean tsunami, the harbor, town and the lighthouse tower were damaged but the damage has been repaired.

== See also ==
- List of lighthouses in Sri Lanka
