= Sangaman Kanda =

Sangaman Kandy: සංගමන් කන්ද; சங்கமன் கண்டி
- Location within Sri Lanka
- Coordinates: 7°1′0″N 81°52′0″E
- Country: Sri Lanka
- Province: Eastern
- District: Ampara
- Time zone: UTC+5:30 (Sri Lanka Standard Time Zone)

Sangaman Kanda or Sangaman Kandy (Tamil: சங்கமன் கண்டி; Sinhala: සංගමන් කන්ද) is a small village in Ampara. It is located within Eastern Province of Sri Lanka. It is the east extreme points of Sri Lanka and located at 3 meters above the sea level.
