= Kovilan Point Lighthouse =

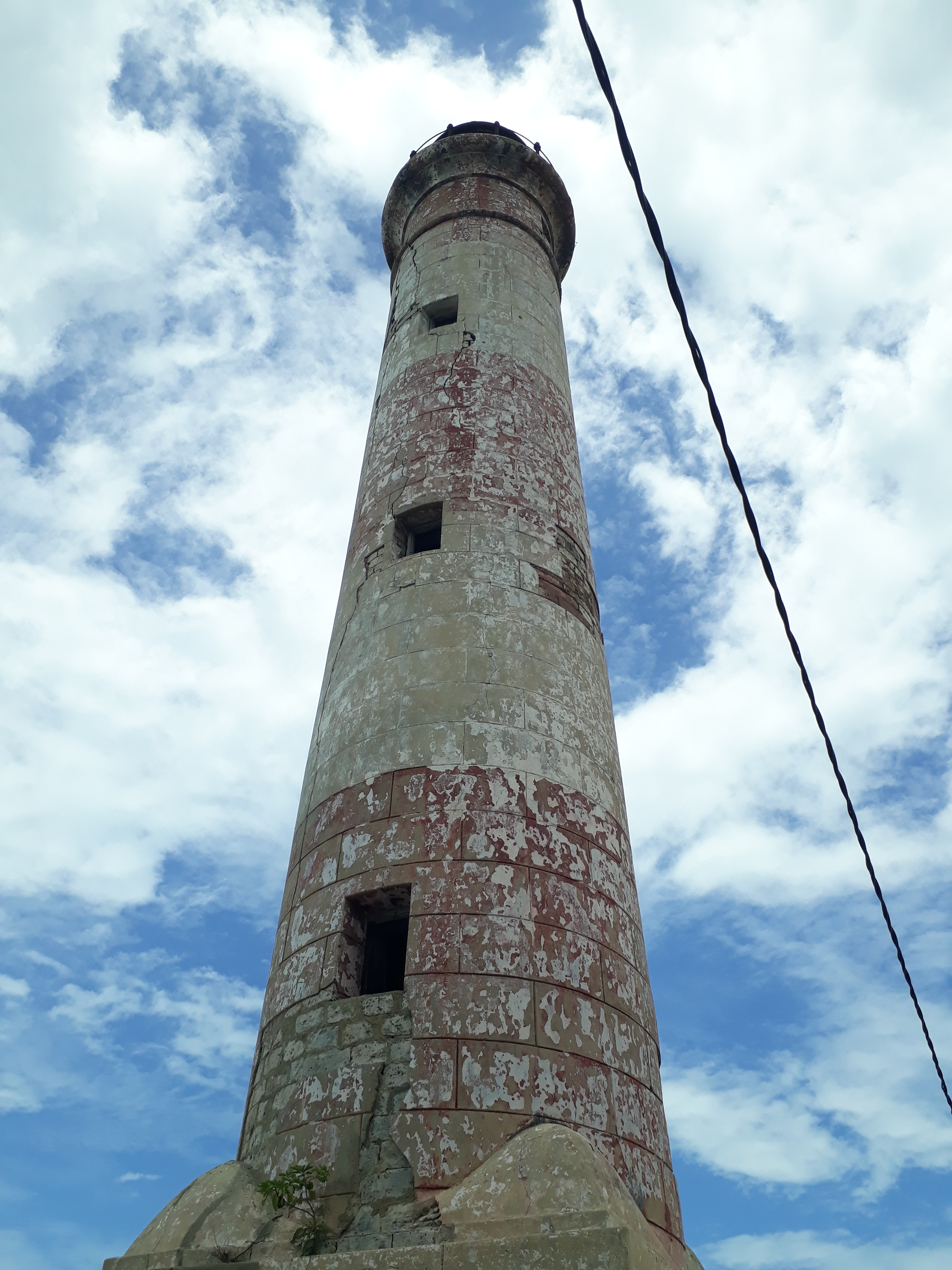
- Location: Karaitivu Island; Jaffna Peninsula; Northern Province; Sri Lanka
- Coordinates: 09°45′42.40″N 79°51′47.85″E

Tower
- Constructed: 1899 (first)
- Construction: masonry tower
- Height: 30 metres (98 ft)
- Shape: cylindrical tower with balcony and lantern
- Markings: white tower and lantern

Light
- First lit: 1916 (current)
- Focal height: 31 metres (102 ft)
- Range: 11 nautical miles (20 km; 13 mi)
- Characteristic: Fl (2) W 10s.

Kovalam Point Lighthouse is a lighthouse on the island of Karaitivu in northern Sri Lanka. The lighthouse, built in 1916 (with the station established in 1899), is a 30 metres (98 ft) white round masonry tower. The light itself is 31 metres (102 ft) above sea level. An observer on a ship 30.48 metres (100.0 ft) tall can see this light from 21.4 nautical miles (39.6 km; 24.6 mi)

== See also ==
- List of lighthouses in Sri Lanka
