= Batticaloa Lighthouse =

Batticaloa Lighthouse Mattuwaran
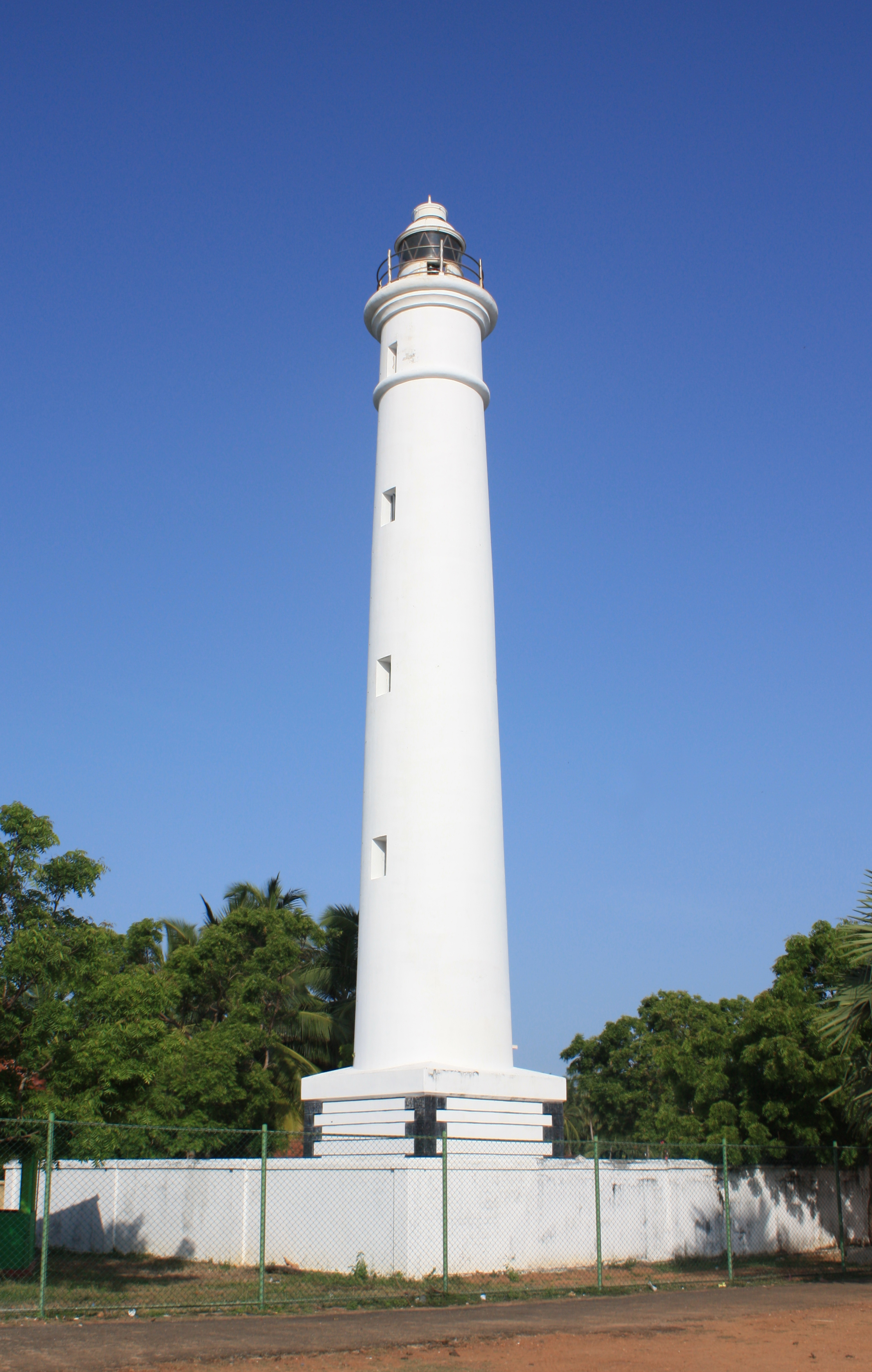
- Batticaloa Lighthouse
- Location: Batticaloa; Eastern Province; Sri Lanka
- Coordinates: 7°45′17.7″N 81°41′07.6″E

Tower
- Constructed: 1913
- Construction: masonry tower
- Height: 28 metres (92 ft)
- Shape: tapered cylindrical tower with balcony and lantern on a stone basement
- Markings: white tower and lantern
- Power source: mains electricity
- Operator: Sri Lanka Ports Authority

Light
- Focal height: 27 metres (89 ft)
- Range: 10 nmi (19 km; 12 mi)
- Characteristic: Fl W 3s.

Batticaloa Lighthouse is a lighthouse in Sri Lanka, situated near the estuary in Palameenmadu. It was built in 1913 and is 28 meters high.

== Location ==
Batticaloa's lighthouse is around 5 km from Batticaloa city, on Bar Road. You can access to it by taking Lake Road (also called Munich Vittoria Friendship Road) near Kallady Bridge and proceeding along Sinna Uppodai Lagoon for around 4 km. It is a very nice area for cycling or walking.

== Gallery ==
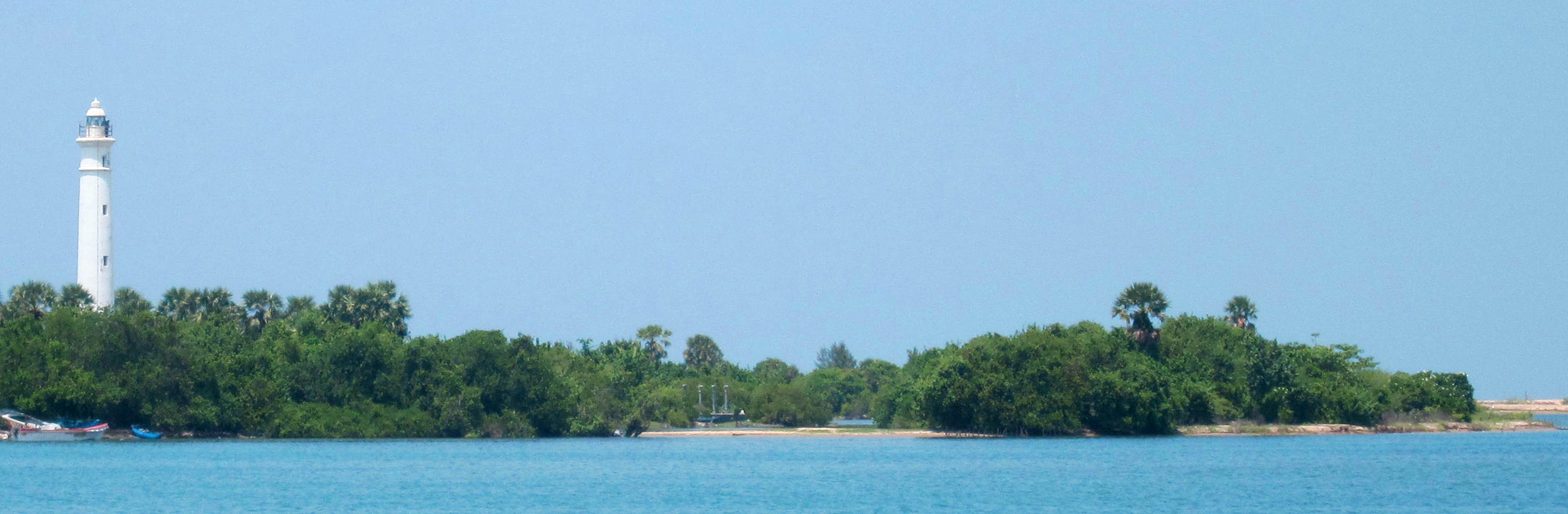
Batticaloa light house from Batticaloa lagoon

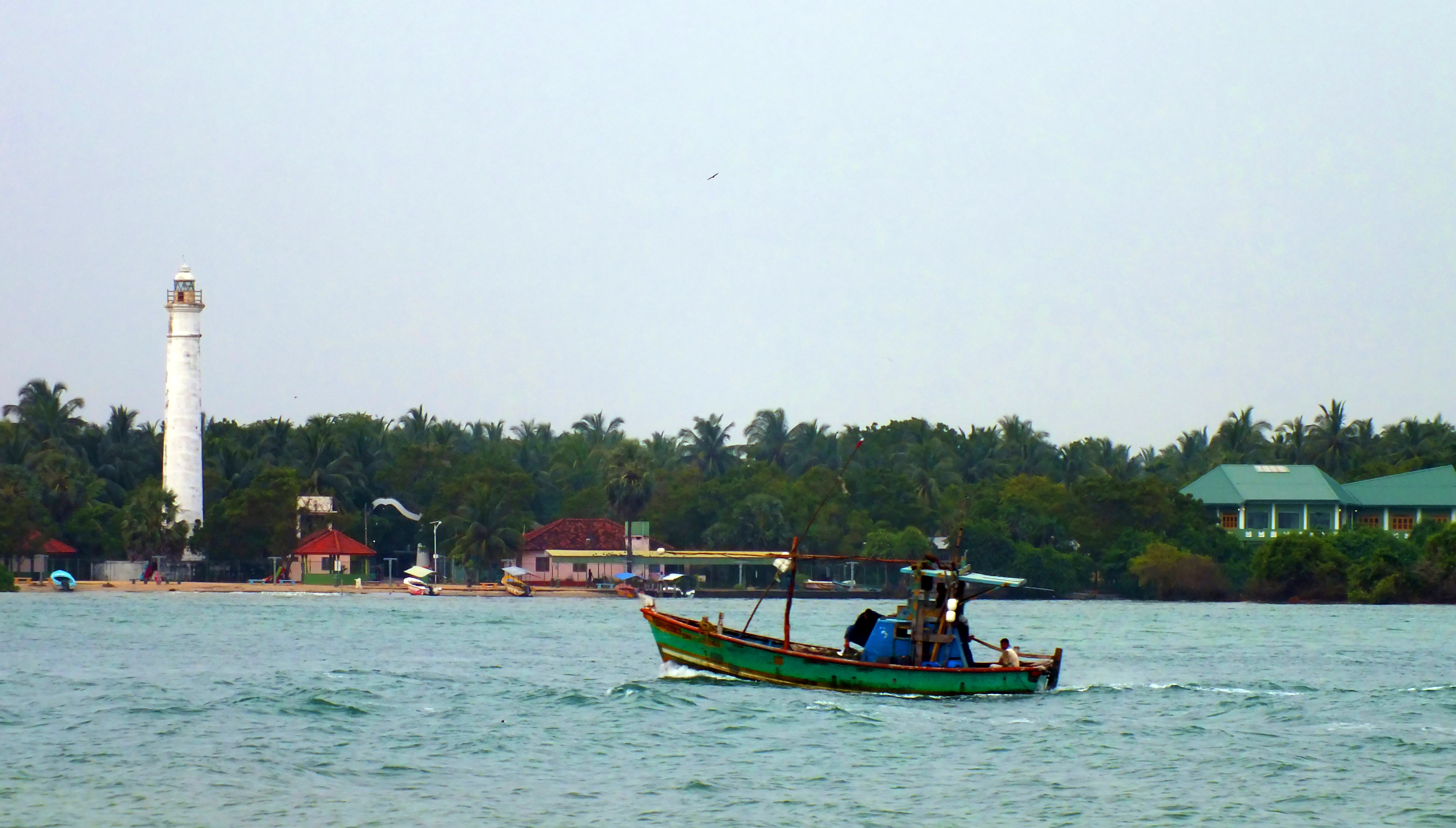
Batticaloa Lighthiuse from Batticaloa Beeach site

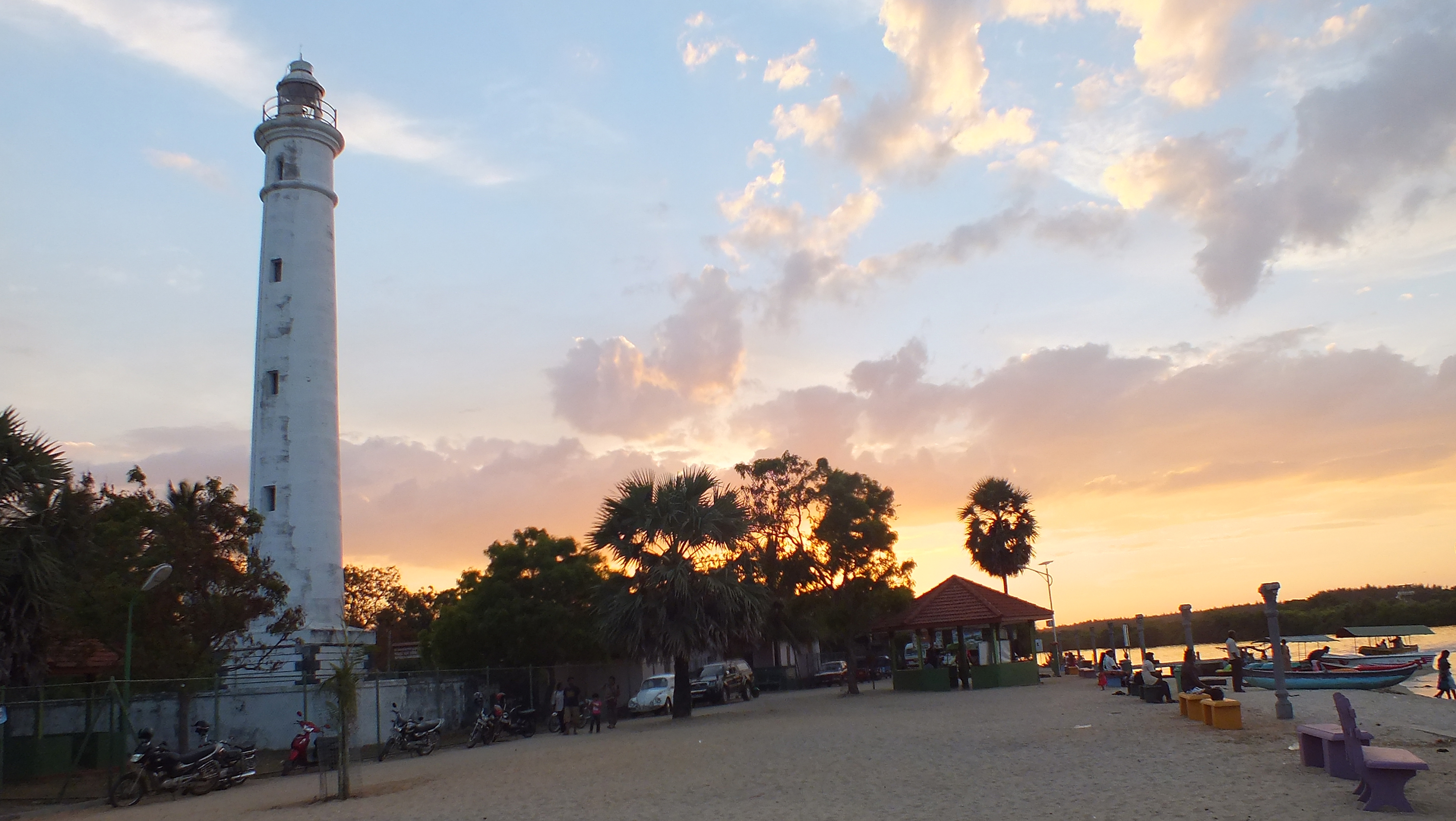
Batticaloa Lighthouse Evening Time

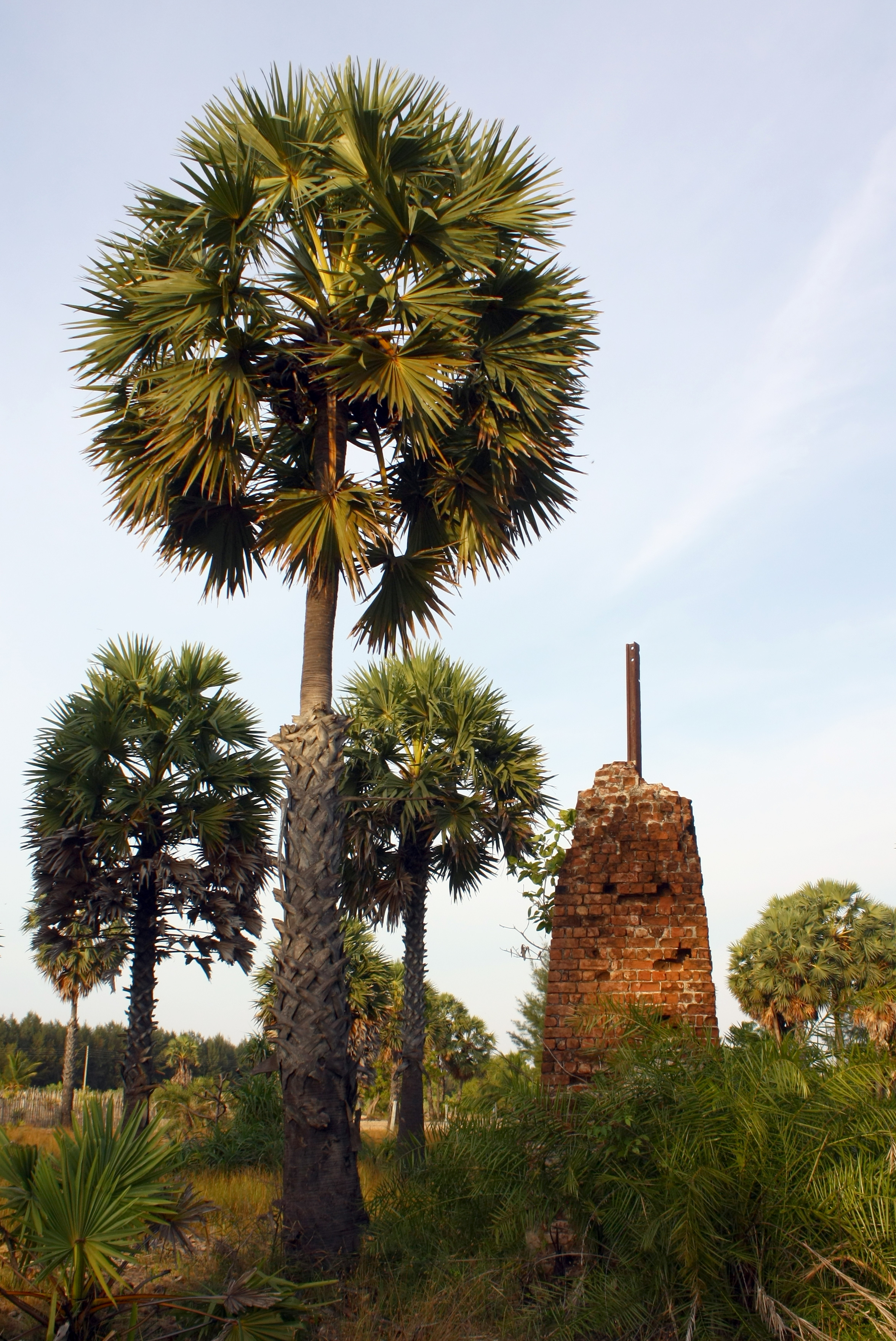
Ruins of old Batticaloa Lighthouse, which was built by British Ceylon

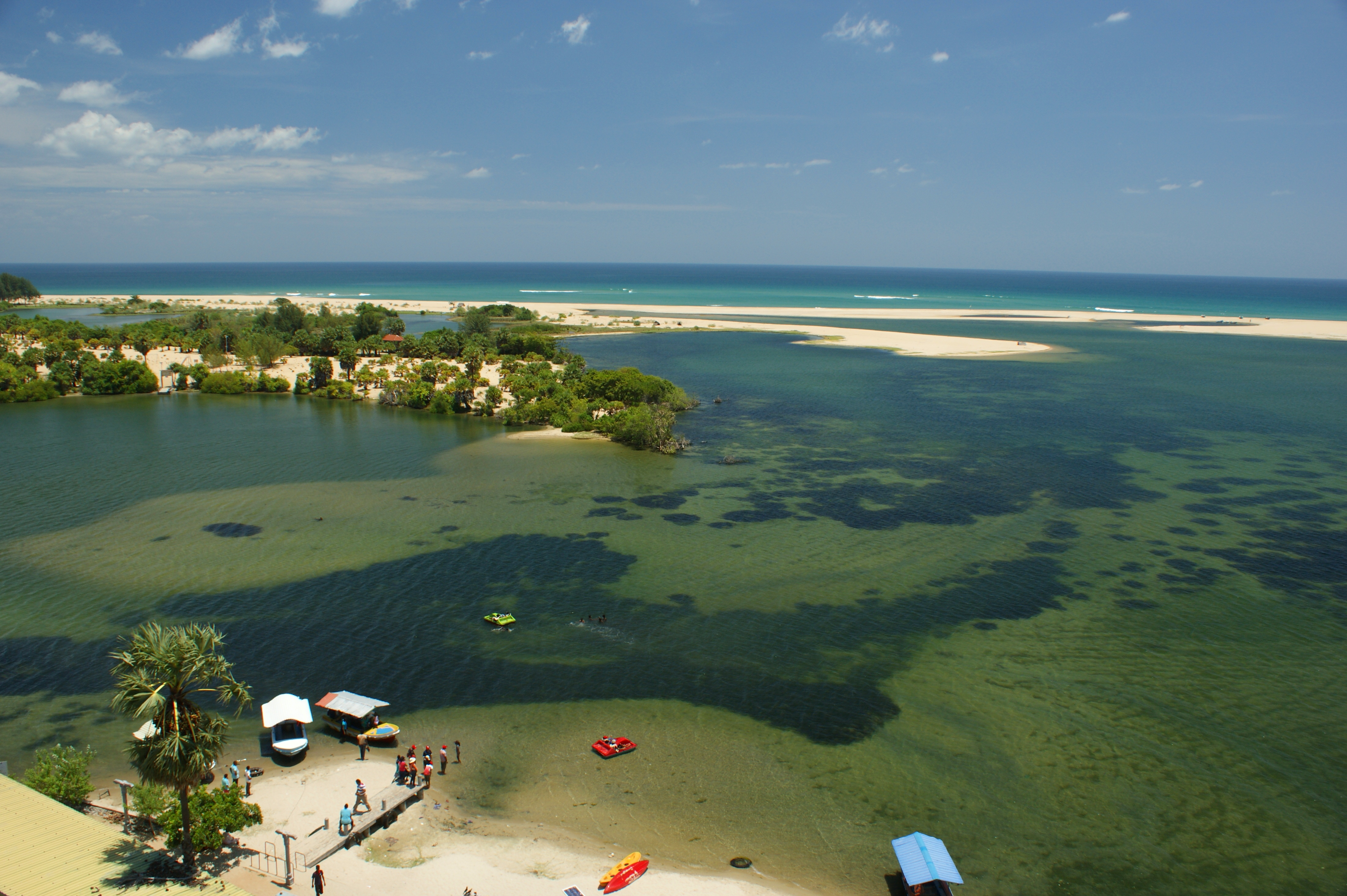
View from the top of the lighthouse

== See also ==
- List of lighthouses in Sri Lanka
