= Great Basses wreck =

18th-century shipwreck off Sri Lanka

Coordinates: 06°10′50″N 81°28′50″E

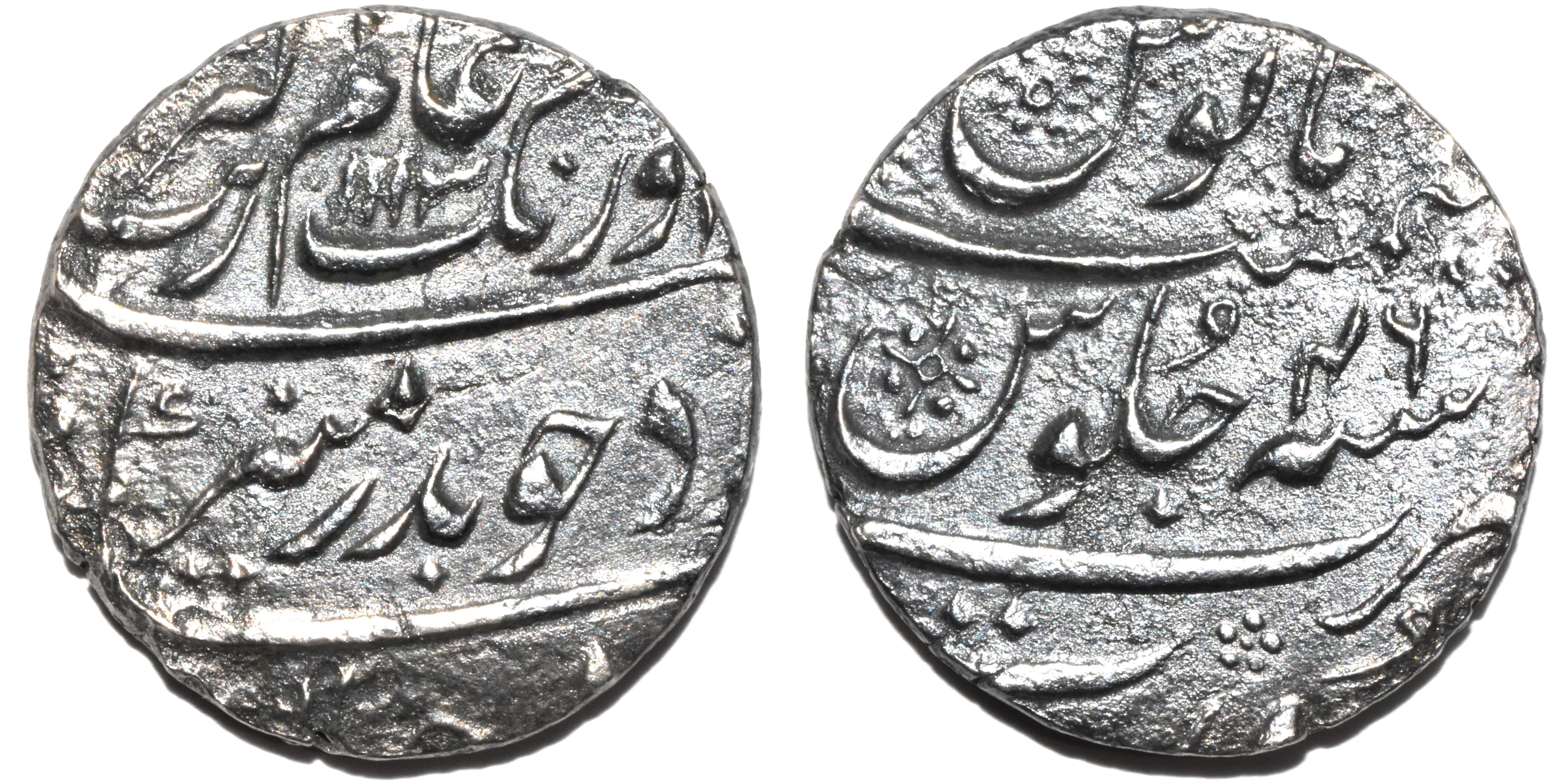
A silver rupee of Aurangzeb recovered from the Great Basses wreck.

The Great Basses wreck is an early 18th-century shipwreck on Great Basses Reef, about 12 km off the south coast of Sri Lanka, discovered by Arthur C. Clarke and Mike Wilson in 1961. The ship, ultimately identified as belonging to the Mughal Emperor Aurangzeb, yielded fused bags of silver rupees, cannons, and other artifacts. The discovery was carefully documented and became the basis for Clarke's 1964 book The Treasure of the Great Reef.

A clump of rupees from the wreck was featured on the History Channel series Pawn Stars in the episode "Shocking Chum" (this segment was shown again in "Greatest Gambles").
