= Point Pedro Lighthouse =

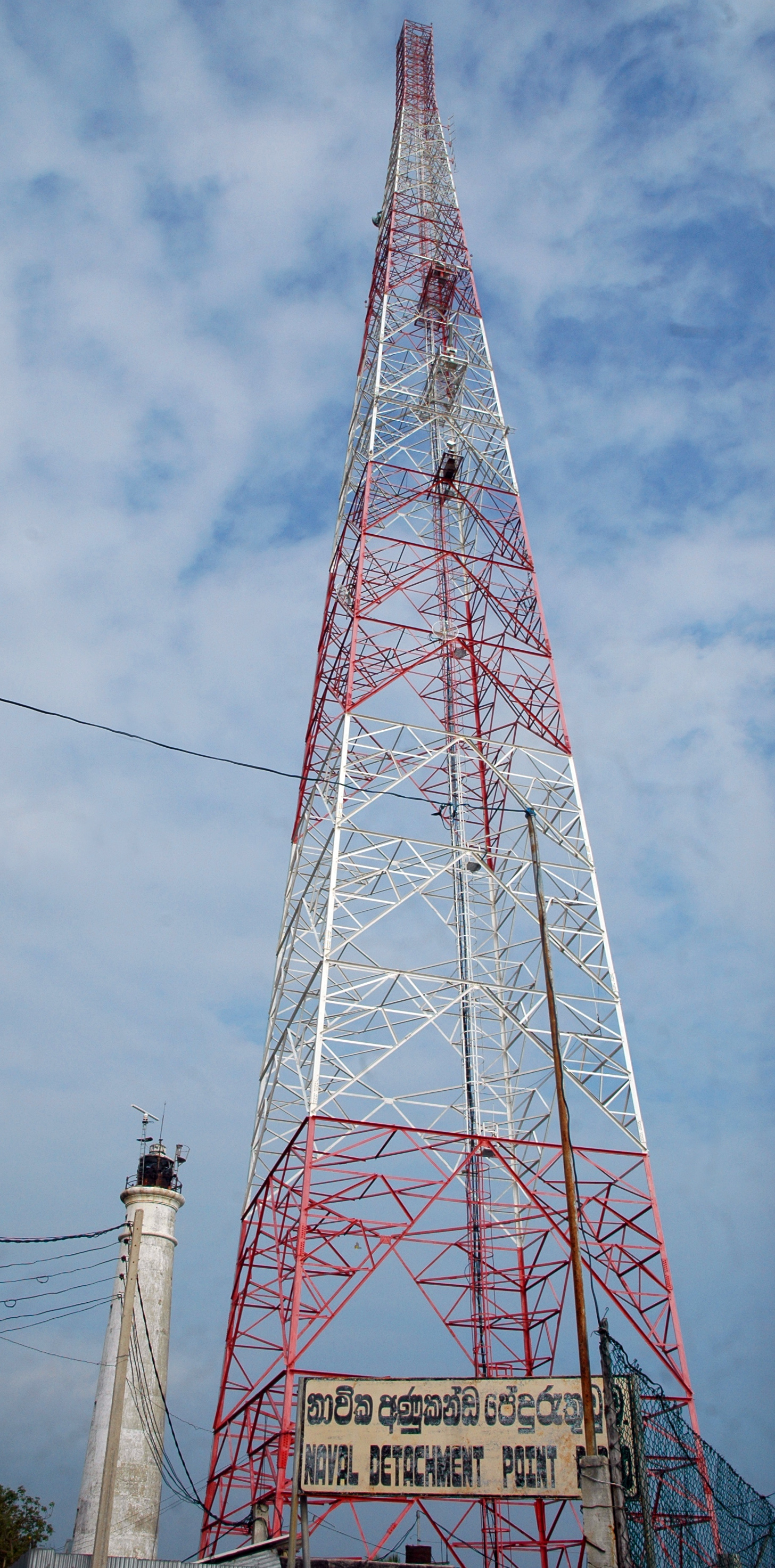
- Point Pedro Lighthouse along with telecommunication tower, overshadowed by a naval communication tower
- Location: Point Pedro; Jaffna District; Northern Province; Sri Lanka
- Coordinates: 09°49′36.8″N 80°14′59.1″E

Tower
- Constructed: 1916
- Construction: masonry tower
- Height: 32 metres (105 ft)
- Shape: cylindrical tower with balcony and lantern
- Markings: white tower and lantern

Light
- Focal height: 31 metres (102 ft)
- Range: 10 nautical miles (19 km; 12 mi)
- Characteristic: Fl W 5s.

Point Pedro Lighthouse is a lighthouse in Point Pedro in northern Sri Lanka. Built in 1916, the 32 metres (105 ft) white lighthouse has a round masonry tower with lantern and gallery. The lighthouse is dwarfed by a vast communication tower for the Sri Lanka Navy.

== See also ==
- List of lighthouses in Sri Lanka
