= Trincomalee Bay =

Bay in Eastern Province, Sri Lanka

- Koddiyar Bay
- ත්‍රිකුණාමලය වරාය (Sinhala); திருகோணமலைத் துறைமுகம் (Tamil)
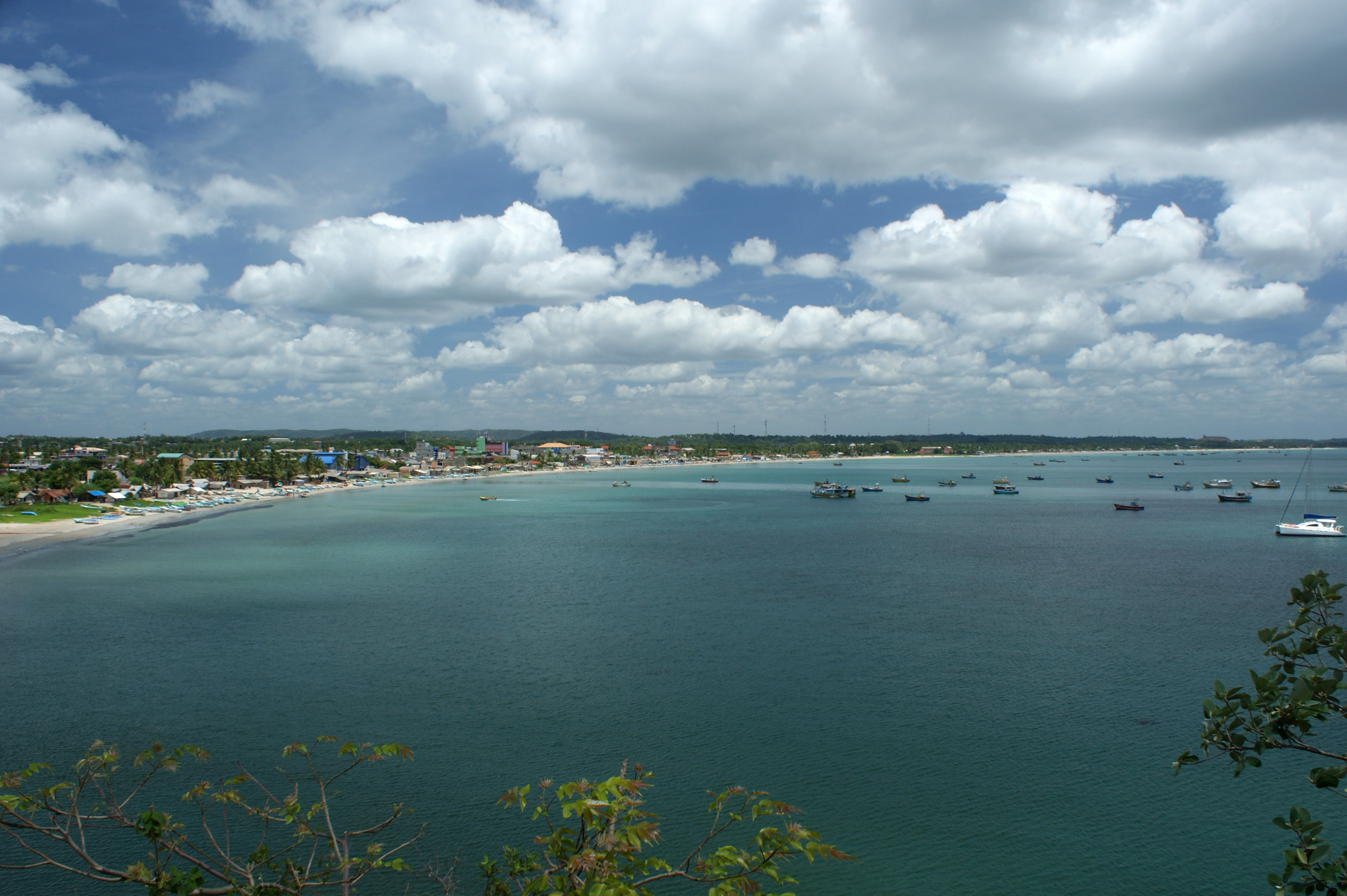
- View of the bay

- Location in Sri Lanka
- Coordinates: 08°30′N 81°14′E
- River sources: Mahaweli River
- Ocean/sea sources: Indian Ocean
- Basin countries: Sri Lanka
- Max. length: 13 km (8.1 mi)
- Max. width: 10 km (6.2 mi)
- Islands: Round Island, Elephant Island, Clappenburg Island, Great Sober Island and Little Sober Island
- Settlements: Trincomalee

Trincomalee Bay, also known as Koddiyar Bay, is a bay in the Eastern Province, Sri Lanka. The bay is located by Trincomalee town on the north-east coast of the island.

== Geography ==
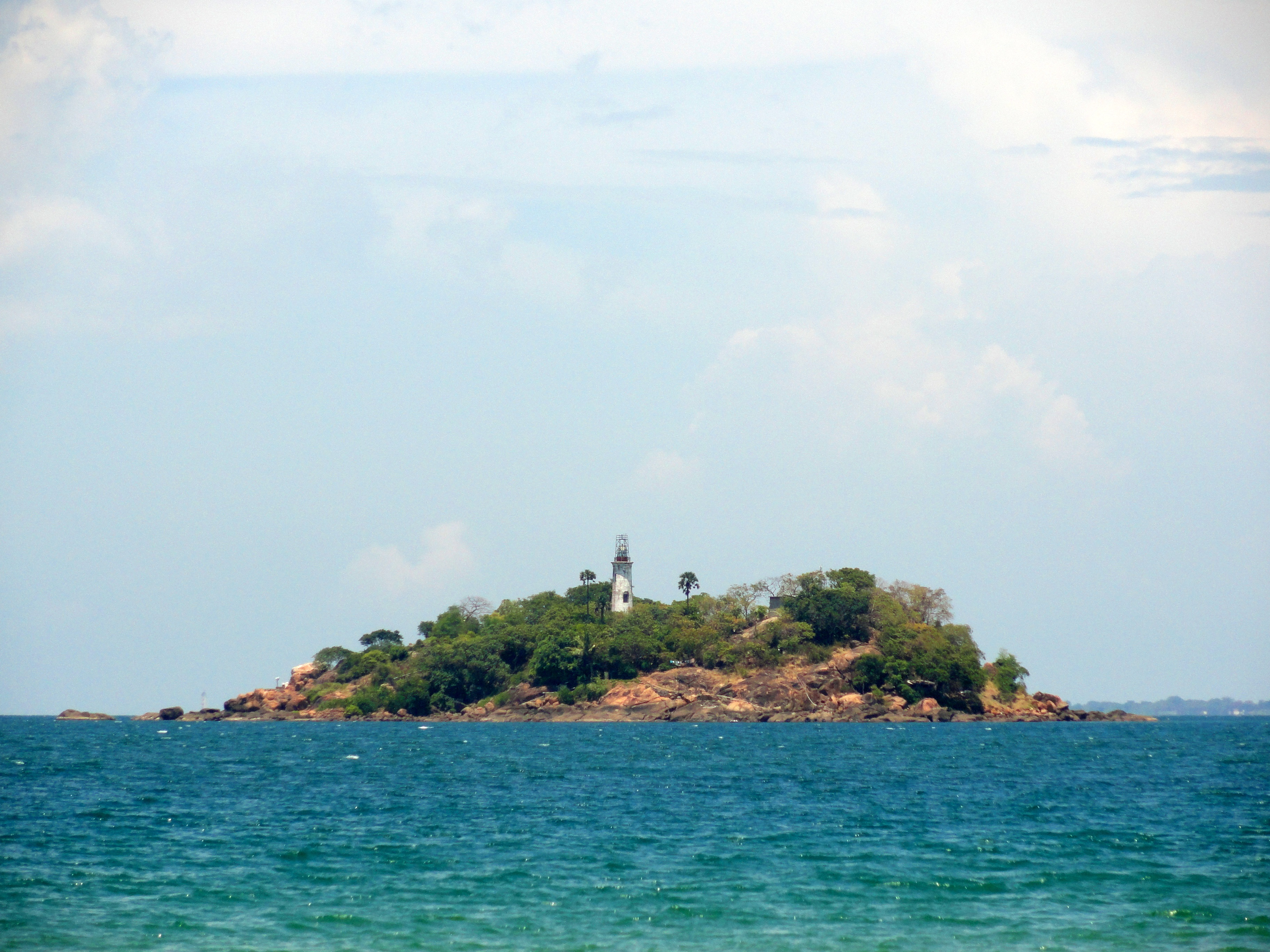
View of Round Island, located on the northern side of the bay's mouth.

Trincomalee Bay is open towards the northeast and has three differentiated parts. The main bay, also known as Koddiyar Bay, is located in the south and southeastern side and fairly regularly shaped, as well as enclosed and deep, forming a large natural harbour in the shores of the Indian Ocean. The commercial harbour is located in the 5 km (3 mi) long and 4 km (2 mi) wide northern indentation, also known as China Bay, on whose western side lies China Bay Airport. Tambalagam Bay is a mostly shallow western indentation of the main bay stretching westwards for 8 km (5 mi).

The bay is overlooked by terraced hills in the northwest and its entrance is guarded by two headlands. Trincomalee Bay has a length of 13 km (8 mi) and a width of 10 km (6 mi), while the mouth of the bay is 5 km (3 mi) wide.

The bay includes a few islands: Round Island, Elephant Island and Clappenburg Island in the main bay, and Great Sober Island and Little Sober Island in China Bay. The latter two are wildlife sanctuaries

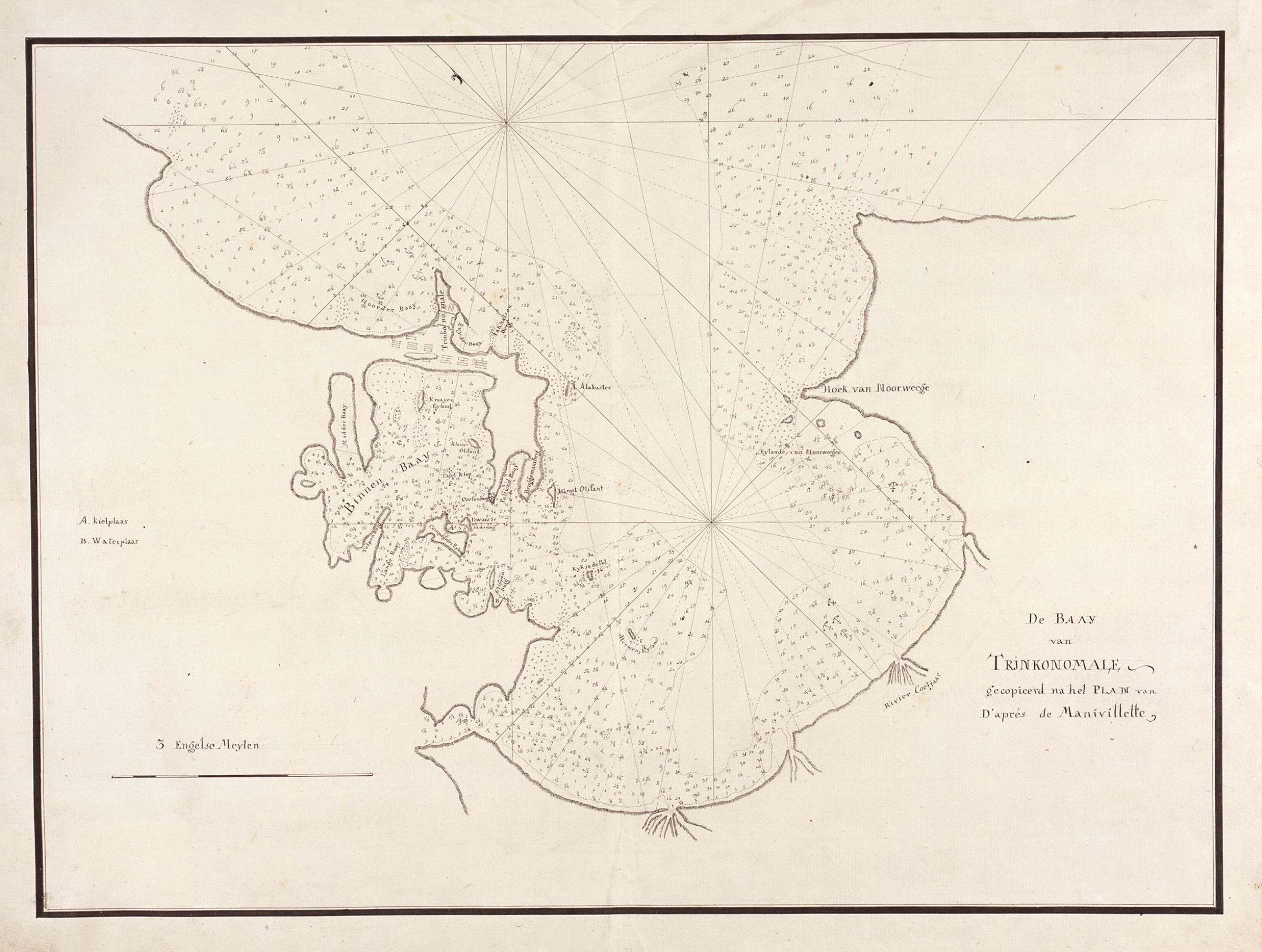
18th century map of Trincomalee Bay.

== History ==
Trincomalee Harbour, formerly a naval base of the Royal Navy, was taken over by the Sri Lankan Government in 1956 to be developed as a commercial port. The base in Trincomalee was fitted out to perform slipway repairs for the Sri Lanka Navy.

== See also ==
- Kinniya Bridge
- List of islands of Sri Lanka
- Round Island Light, Sri Lanka
