= Mannar Island Lighthouse (old) =

Old Thalaimannar Lighthouse
- Location: Mannar Island, Sri Lanka
- Coordinates: 09°05′37.85″N 79°41′53.80″E

Light
- Deactivated: Unknown

Mannar Island Lighthouse is a lighthouse in Urumalai on Mannar Island in northern Sri Lanka. The inactive lighthouse is an iron structure.

== See also ==
- List of lighthouses in Sri Lanka
