= Dondra =

Devinuwara: දෙවිනුවර; දෙවුන්දර; தேவேந்திரமுனை
- City
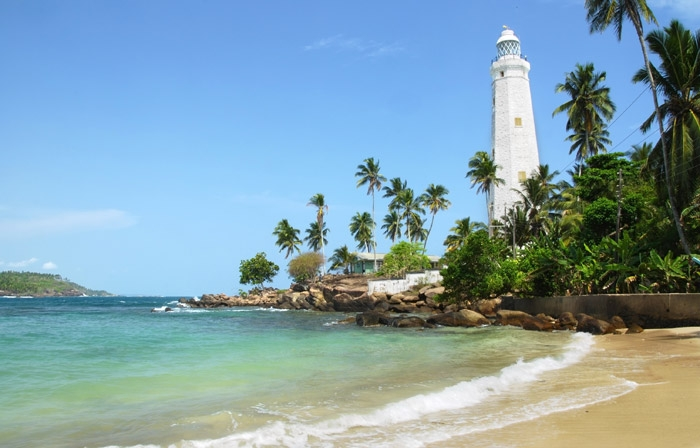
- Dondra Head Lighthouse
- Nicknames: Devi Nuwara (God's Town), Thevanthurai (Lord's Port), Tenthurai (Southern Port)
- Location in Sri Lanka
- Country: Sri Lanka
- Province: Southern Province
- Division: Devinuwara

Government
  - Type: Municipal Council

Population
  - Total: 48,253
  - Ethnic groups: Sinhalese Tamils and Muslims
- Time zone: UTC+5:30 (Sri Lanka Standard Time Zone)

Dondra (Sinhala: දෙවිනුවර / දෙවුන්දර, romanized: Devinuvara / Devundara, Tamil: தேவேந்திரமுனை/தேவந்துறை, romanized: Tēvēntiramuṉai/Tevanturai) is a settlement on the extreme southernmost tip of Sri Lanka, in the Indian Ocean near Matara, Southern Province, Sri Lanka. The Dondra Head Lighthouse, ruins of several Hindu shrines of Tenavaram and a Vihara (Buddhist temple) are located in the vicinity.

== Etymology ==
King Nissankamalla's (1187-1196 A.D.) Dambulla Vihara rock inscription is considered the oldest document that mentions the name Devi-nuwara which means the "City of Gods". The Pali form of the name, Deva-nagara appears for the first time in the Mahavamsa with reference to the reign of King Vijayabahu I (1058-1114 A.D.). The name Dondra is the anglicized form of the Sinhalese name Devi-nuwara or Devundara.

Religion in Devinuwara Ds Division (2012)
1. Buddhist (98.1%)
2. Hindu (0.10%)
3. Muslim (1.40%)
4. Roman Catholic (0.20%)
5. Other Christian (0.20%)
6. Other (0.00%)

According to some, the name Dondra is a form of Theivanthurai (God's Port) of Tamil origin.

== History ==
Historically known as Devinuwara temple port town or Devinuwara temple town, Dondra was until the late 16th century a historic temple port town complex. A multi-religious site, its primary deity was the Buddhist god Upulvan and at its zenith was one of the most celebrated religious sites of the island, containing a thousand statues of the various sects of Hinduism and Buddhism. Dating from the period of Dappula I, it was maintained primarily by Sinhalese kings and merchant guilds at the port town during its time as a popular pilgrimage destination and famed emporium, having extensive contacts with Asia, Africa, Europe and the Malabar Coast. The temple was built on vaulted arches on the promontory overlooking the Indian ocean. Patronized by various Sinhalese and Tamil royal dynasties and pilgrims, Tenavaram temple became one of the most important places of worship. Built to the Chera style of classical Dravidian architecture, it covered a vast area housing shrines to many Hindu deities including Lord Shiva and Lord Vishnu. Its rediscovered statue images and ruins from the 5th-7th century CE reflect the high points of Pallava art.

The central gopuram tower of the Vimana and the other gopura towers that dominated the town were covered with plates of gilded brass, gold and copper on their roofs, and the many shrines of the town were bordered with elaborate arches and gates, giving the entire temple complex an appearance of a city to sailors who visited the port to trade and relied on its light reflecting gopura roofs for navigational purposes. Chroniclers, travellers and benefactors of the temples describe the entire town as the property of the temple and inhabited solely by merchants during the medieval period. The temple complex was visited by Ibn Battuta in the 14th century and Zheng He in the 15th century.

The temple was destroyed in February 1587 by the Portuguese colonial De Sousa d'Arronches, who devastated the entire southern coast. Its ruins of granite pillars that formed the shrines' mandapa can be found in the town spread over a considerable area. Much of the temple's stonework was thrown off the cliff into the sea. The temple's ancient Lingam statue and sculpture of Nandi, excavated in 1998 provide early examples of Pallava Hindu contributions to the island.

The rebuilt temple to Vishnu and the Vihara still attracts pilgrims today and in the month of Esala (July–August) the Dondra Fair and Perahara is held for eight days.

Dondra was once the capital of the Sri Lanka.

Today, Devinuwara DS Division area is a Sinhala Buddhist stronghold. According to 2012 census data 98.07% of the total population of Devinuwara DS Division is Buddhist. Only 0.11% is Hindu.

== Gallery ==
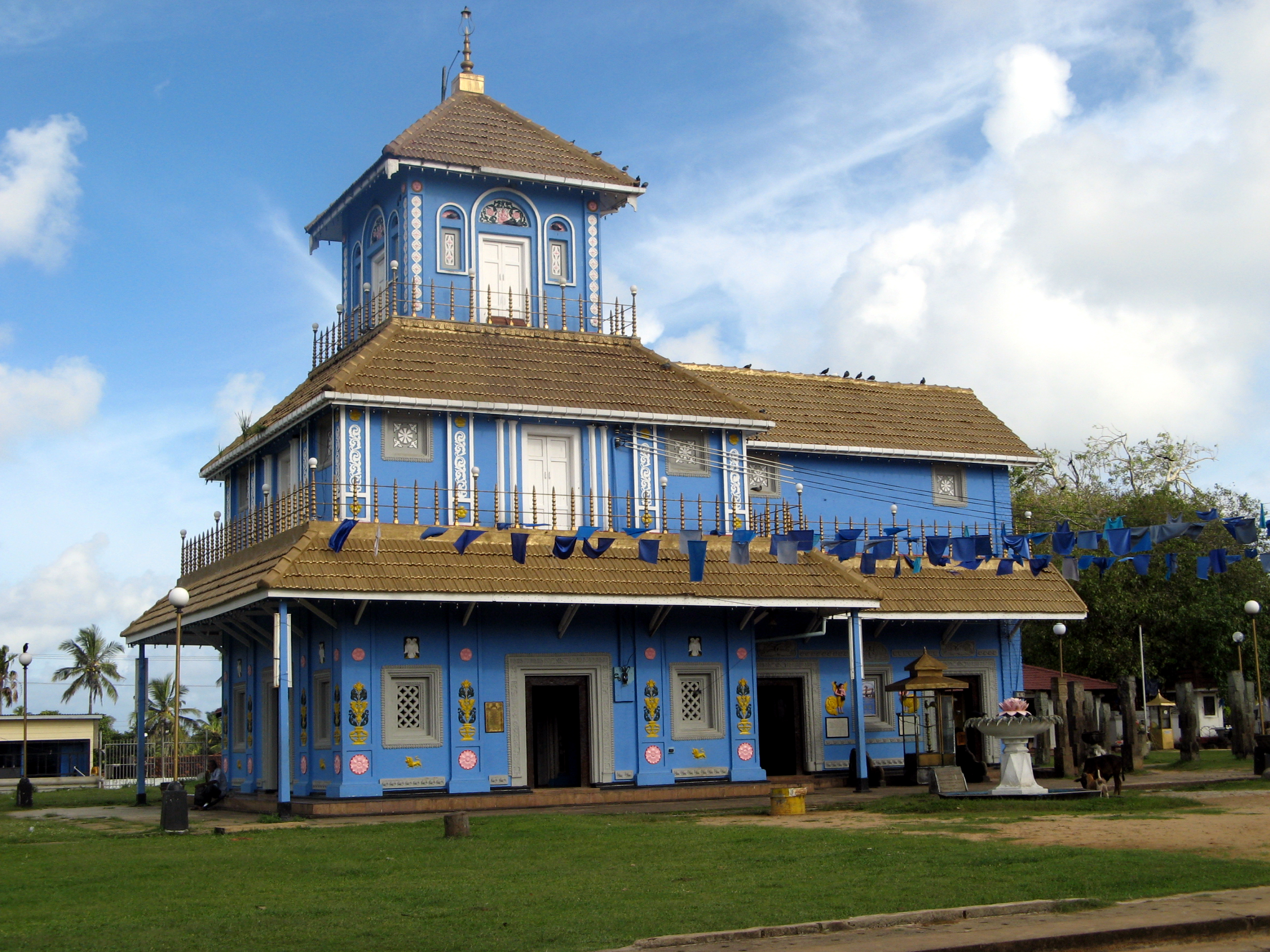
Modern Vishnu shrine, Dondra

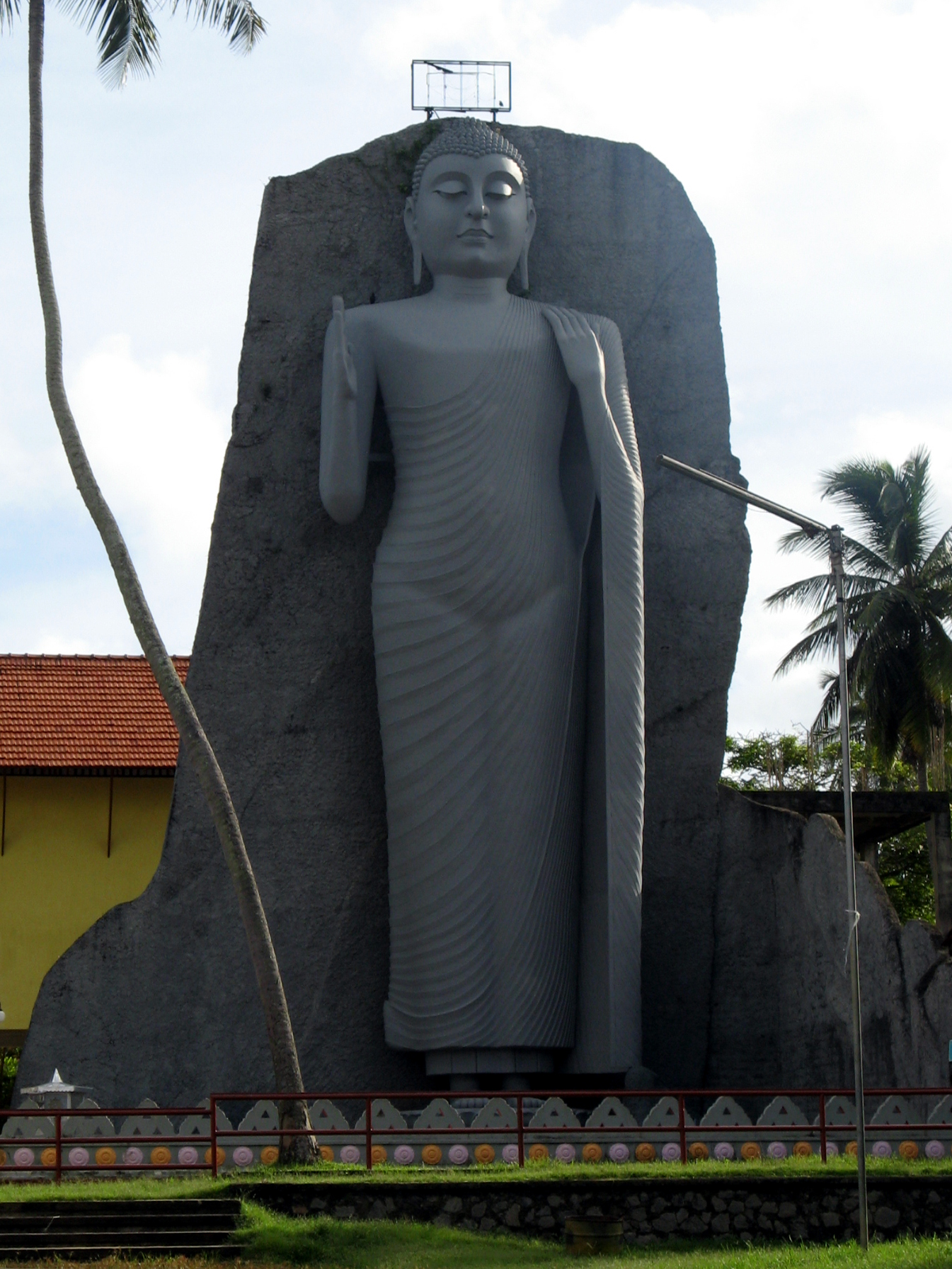
Modern Buddha Statue, Dondra

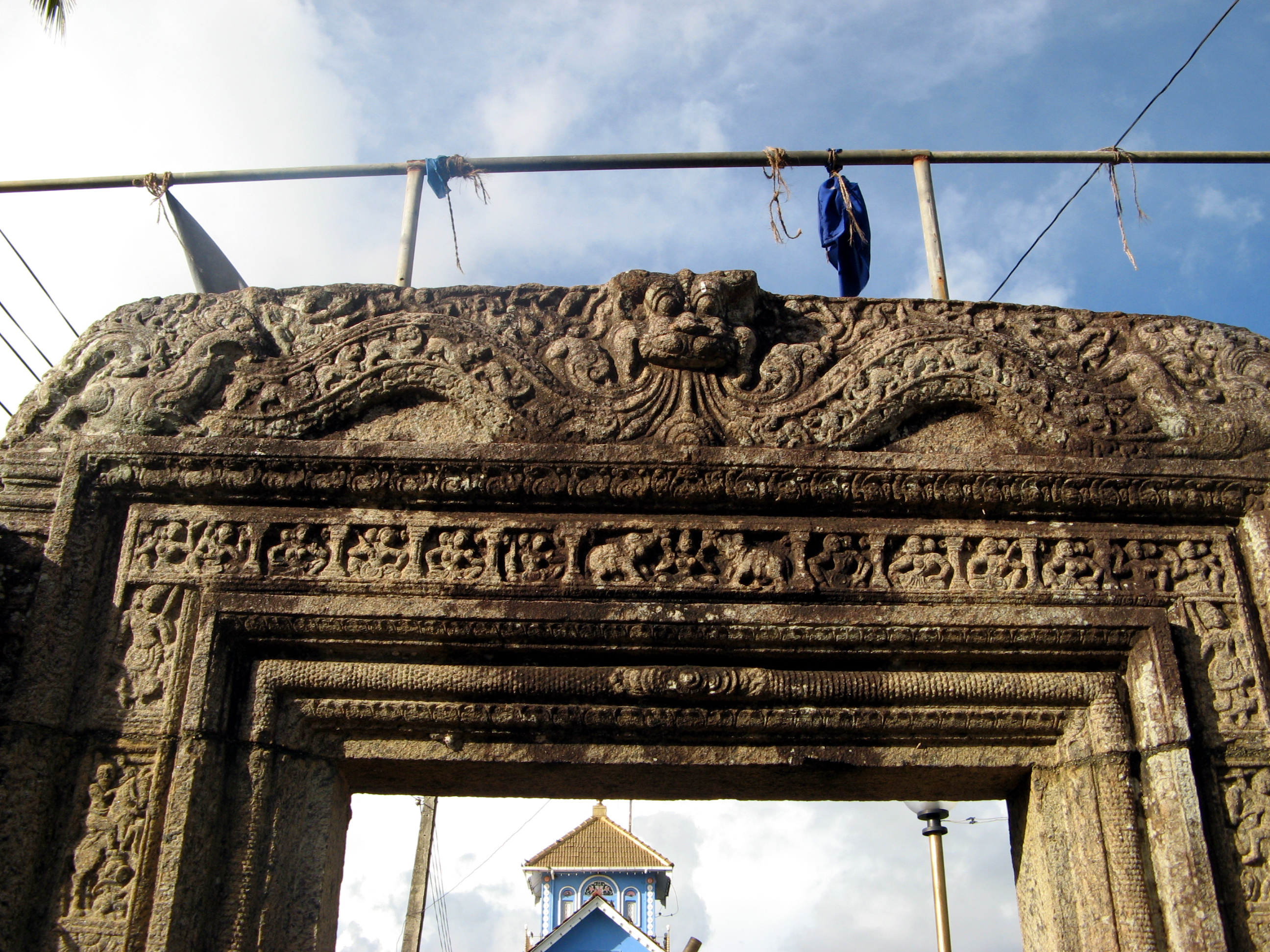
Ancient temple arch, Dondra

Devinuwara Sri Vishnu Maha Devalaya

== See also ==
- Dondra Head Lighthouse
- Tondeswaram
- Extreme points of Sri Lanka
