= Great Basses Reef Lighthouse =

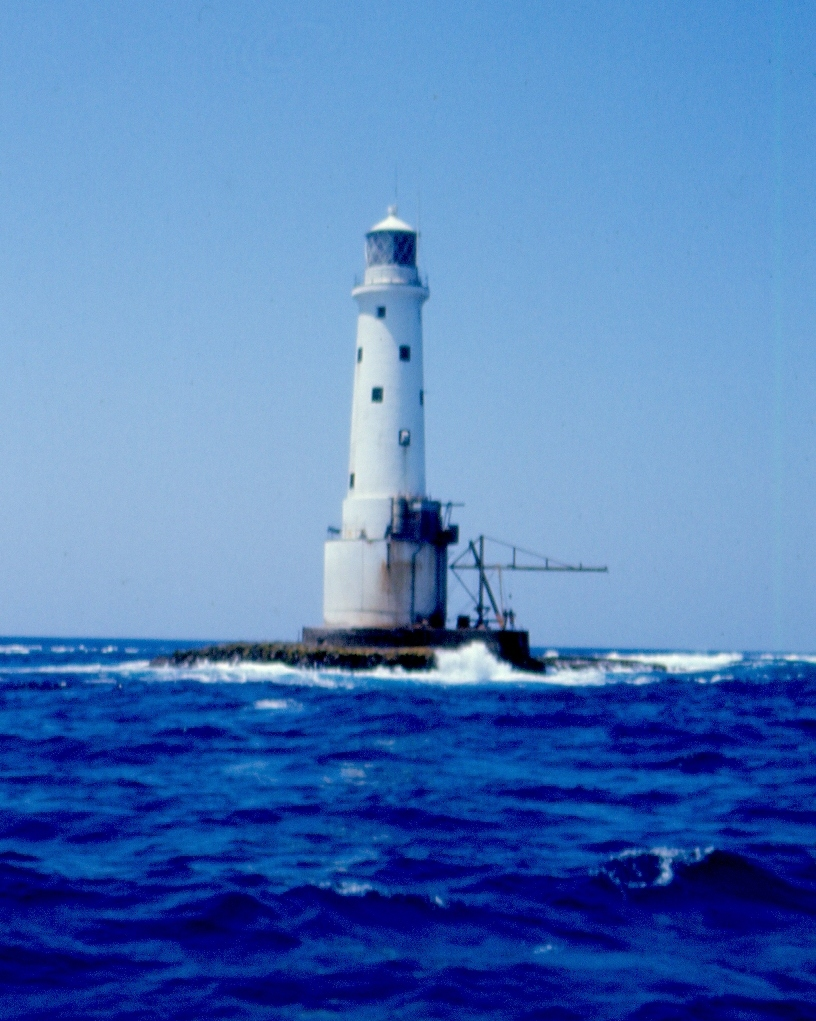
- Great Basses Reef Lighthouse
- Location: South of Sri Lanka
- Coordinates: 6°10′55.46″N 81°28′58.82″E

Tower
- Constructed: 1873
- Construction: Scottish granite tower
- Height: 37 metres (121 ft)
- Shape: cylindrical tower with double balcony and lantern
- Markings: white tower and lantern
- Power source: solar power
- Operator: Sri Lanka Ports Authority

Light
- Focal height: 34 metres (112 ft)
- Lens: hyperradiant Fresnel lens
- Range: 34 nautical miles (63 km; 39 mi)
- Characteristic: Fl W 15s.

Great Basses Reef Lighthouse is an offshore lighthouse in the south of Sri Lanka, operated and maintained by the Sri Lanka Ports Authority. It is located on a reef 13 km off the coast of Yala National Park, near Little Basses Reef Lighthouse. It is accessible only by boat. The two Basses lighthouses, 'Great' and 'Little', are among the most famous offshore lighthouses of Asia.

== History ==
The necessity of a lighthouse was acknowledged in 1856, a design of an iron tower on a granite base was suggested and costs began to be incurred with no results.

A new design of the lighthouse by Alexander Gordon and James Nicholas Douglass was put forward in 1867 and approved. The executive engineer in charge was William Douglass, brother of James (later Sir James). Two steam vessels were used, each capable of carrying 120 tonnes of stone and each equipped with lifting gear, as each block weighs 2 to 3 tons. The first stone was laid in December 1870, the last in late 1872 and the light was lit in March 1873. The cost had been £63,000, of which £40,000 had been expended to no effect before Trinity House and William Douglass were involved.

It withstood the force of the 2004 tsunami with only modest damage; it was repaired with assistance from the UK lighthouse authorities Trinity House and The Northern Lighthouse Board.

The reef is the site of the Great Basses wreck, an early 18th-century wreck of an Indian ship, carrying a treasure of silver rupees, that the science-fiction writer Arthur C. Clarke and Mike Wilson discovered in 1961.

=== Lens ===
Great Basses was one of a limited number of lighthouses that were designed to house the large Hyperradiant Fresnel lenses that became available at the end of the 19th century. Four of these lenses were used in Sri Lankan lights, all made by Chance Brothers in England.

== See also ==
- List of lighthouses in Sri Lanka

== Gallery ==
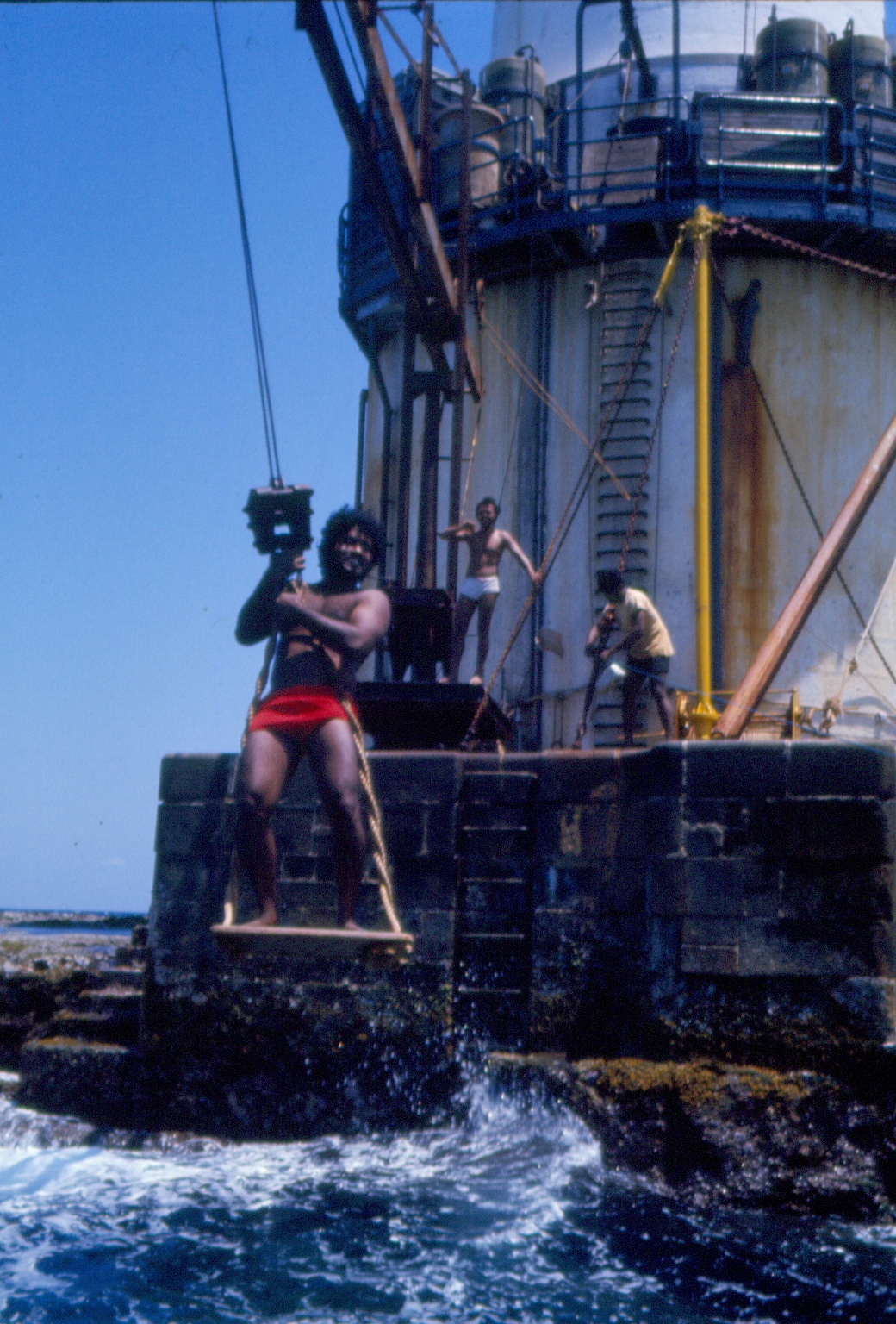
Getting new supplies

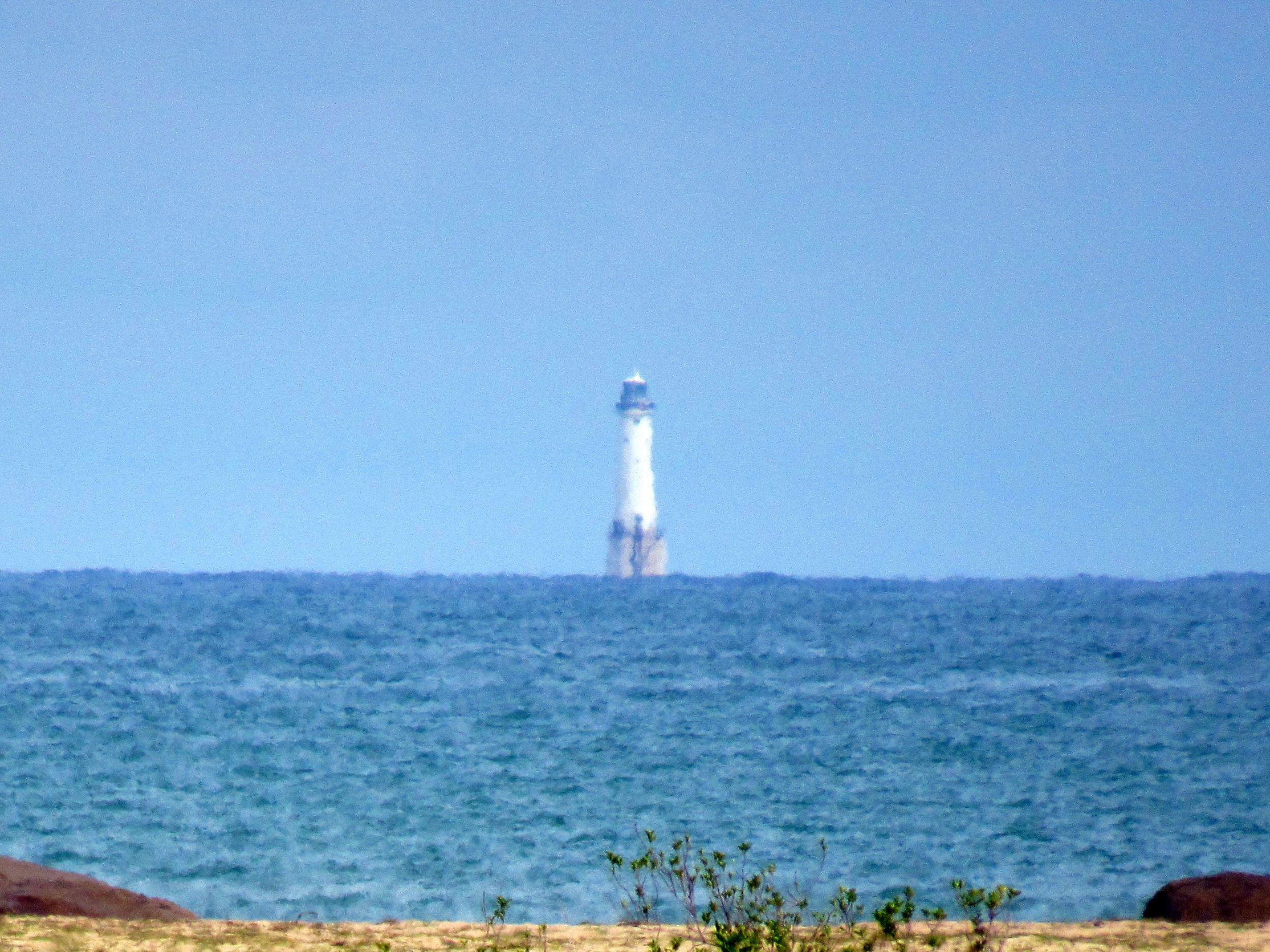
The lighthouse as seen from Yala National Park.
