= Round Island Light, Sri Lanka =

Lighthouse in Sri Lanka

Round Island Lighthouse Trincomalee Kevuliya
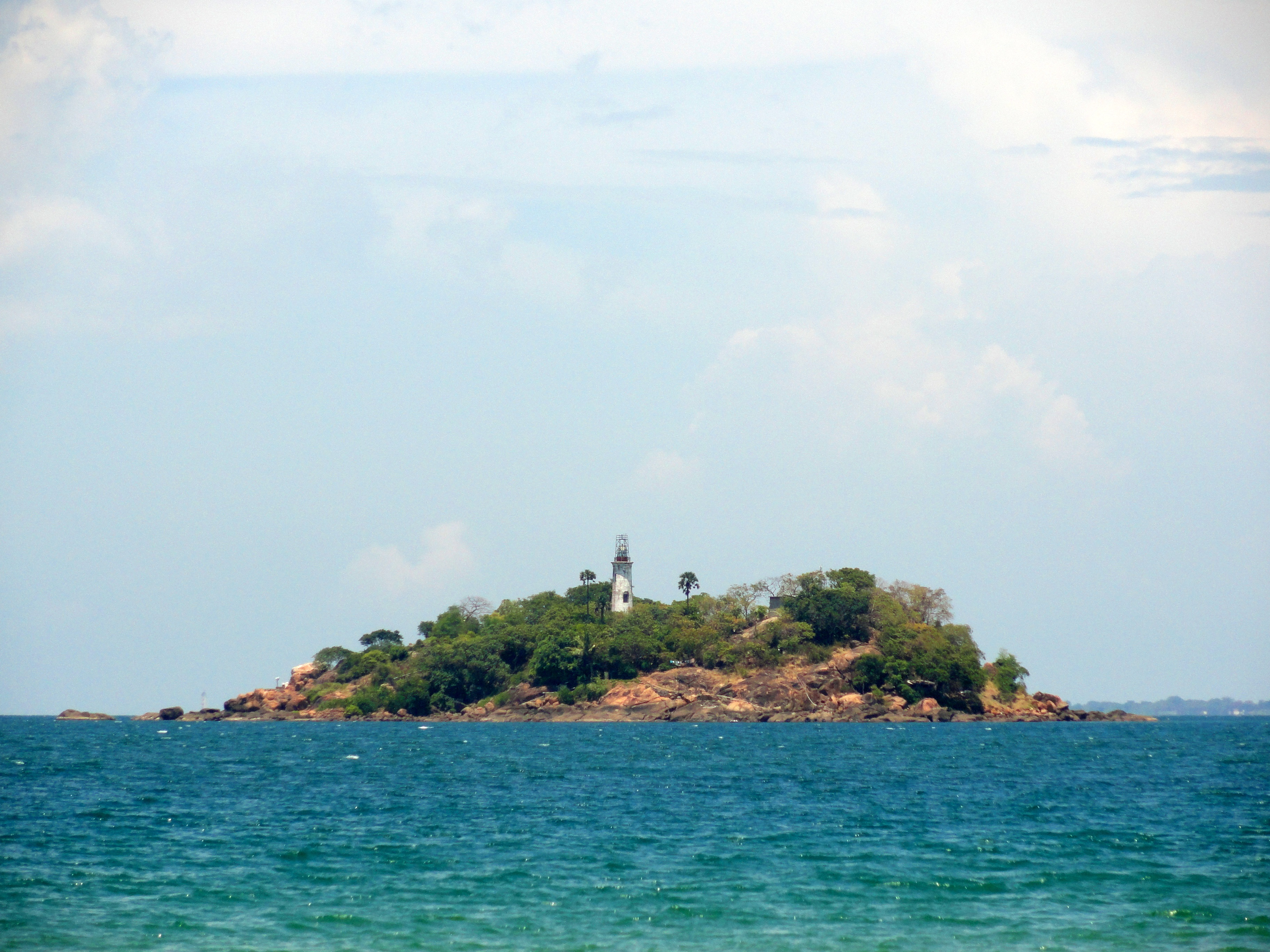
- The lighthouse in 2011
- Location: Trincomalee Harbour; Trincomalee; Eastern Province; Sri Lanka
- Coordinates: 8°30′46.6″N 81°13′33.2″E

Tower
- Constructed: 1863
- Construction: masonry tower
- Automated: yes
- Height: 21 metres (69 ft)
- Shape: cylindrical tower with balcony and lantern
- Markings: white tower

Light
- Focal height: 31 metres (102 ft)
- Characteristic: Fl (3) WR 15s.

The Round Island Lighthouse (also known as the Trincomalee Light or Kevuliya Light) is an offshore lighthouse on Round Island in Trincomalee Bay, Sri Lanka and is operated and maintained by the Sri Lanka Ports Authority. The lighthouse was erected in 1863, originally it was a red light however in 1864 it was changed to white.

The 21-metre-high (69 ft) lighthouse is located atop a small island in the bay; one of the white sectors marks the proper line of entrance to the harbor. It is accessible only by boat however both the island and lighthouse are closed to the public.

== See also ==
- List of lighthouses in Sri Lanka
