= Extreme points of Sri Lanka =

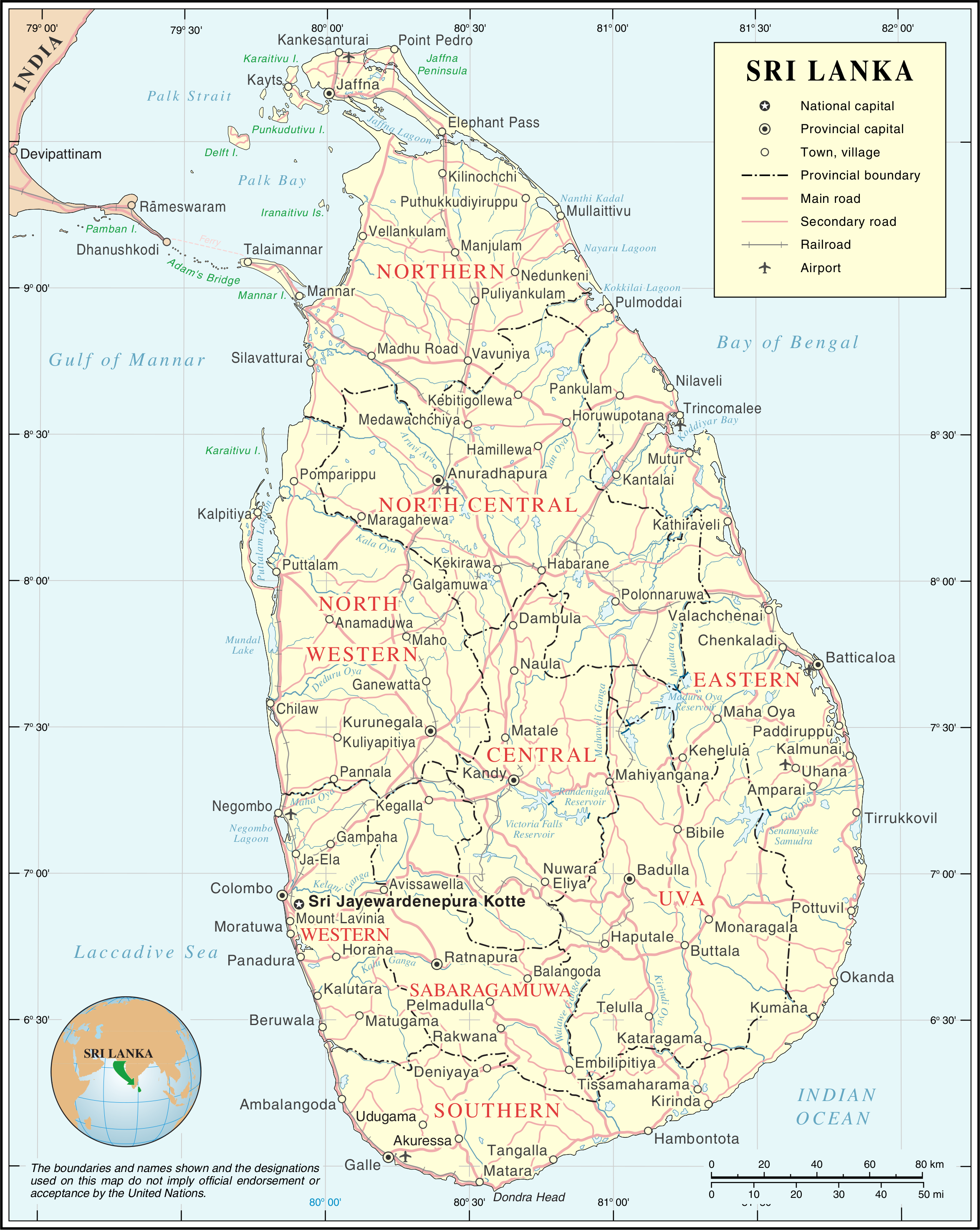
A map of Sri Lanka

This is a list of the extreme points and extreme elevations of Sri Lanka.

== Extreme coordinates ==
Heading	Location	District	Province	Coordinates
Northernmost	Sakkotai Cape	Jaffna	Northern	9°50′8″N 80°12′44″E
Southernmost	Dondra Head	Matara	Southern	5°55′6.9″N 80°35′28″E
Easternmost	Sangaman Kanda	Ampara	Eastern	7°1′20″N 81°52′45″E
Westernmost	Kachchatheevu Island	Jaffna	Northern	9°23′N 79°31′E
Westernmost (mainland)	Near Kalpitiya	Puttalam	North Western	8°12′N 77°36′E

== Elevation extremes ==
Heading	Location	Altitude	District	Province	Coordinates
Highest	Pidurutalagala (Mount Pedro)	2,524 m (8,281 ft)	Nuwara Eliya	Central	7°0′3″N 80°46′26″E

== See also ==
- Extreme points of Earth
- Geography of Sri Lanka
