= Little Basses Reef Lighthouse =

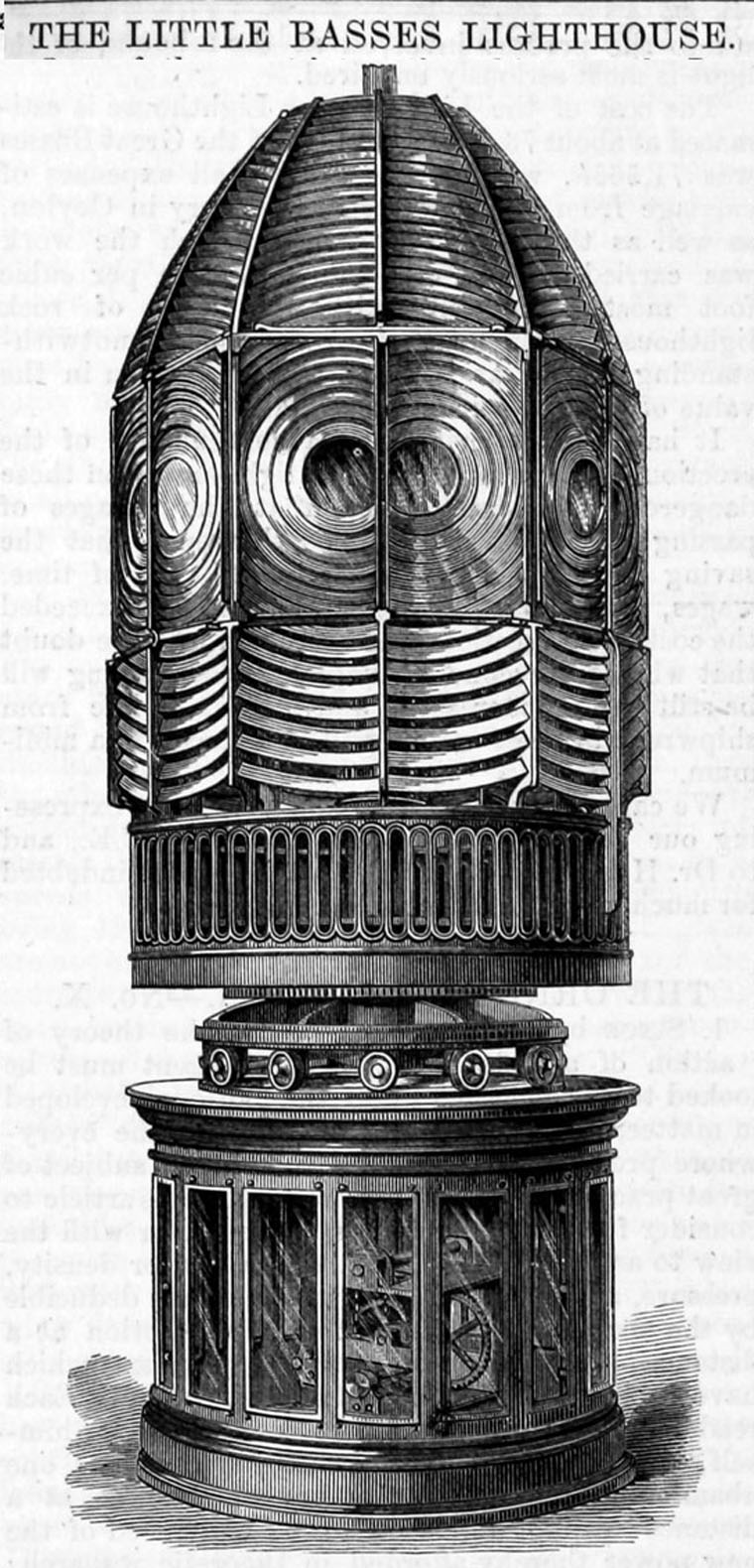
- Location: Kuda Ravana Kotuwa; Southern Sri Lanka
- Coordinates: 6.407297°N 81.730232°E

Tower
- Constructed: 1878
- Construction: granite tower
- Height: 37 metres (121 ft)
- Shape: cylindrical tower with balcony and lantern
- Markings: white tower with a black horizontal band

Light
- Focal height: 34 metres (112 ft)
- Lens: hyperradiant Fresnel lens
- Range: 27 nautical miles (50 km; 31 mi)
- Characteristic: VQ (2) W 10s.

Little Basses Reef Lighthouse is an active offshore lighthouse at the southern end of Sri Lanka and it is operated and maintained by the Sri Lanka Navy. It is located on a reef called Kuda Ravana Kotuwa (Fort of Little Ravana), but when the British invaded Ceylon they named it Little Basses (fourteen kilometers off the coast of Yala National Park and northeast of the Great Basses Reef Lighthouse). The two Basses lighthouses are among the most famous offshore lighthouses of Asia.

The lighthouse was designed by Sir James Nicholas Douglass and built by William Douglass using the same steam ships, crew and workers as the Great Basses Reef Lighthouse was completed in 1878.

It withstood the force of a tsunami in 2004 with only modest damage; it was repaired with assistance from the UK lighthouse authorities Trinity House and the Northern Lighthouse Board.

The lighthouse is close to Daedalus Rock, site of the sinking of HMS Daedalus (1811).

== Lens ==
Little Basses was one of a limited number of lighthouses that were designed to house the large Hyperradiant Fresnel lenses that became available at the end of the 19th century. Four of these lenses were used in Sri Lankan lights, all made by Chance Brothers in England.

== See also ==
- List of lighthouses in Sri Lanka
