= 21-gun salute =

Most commonly recognized customary gun salute

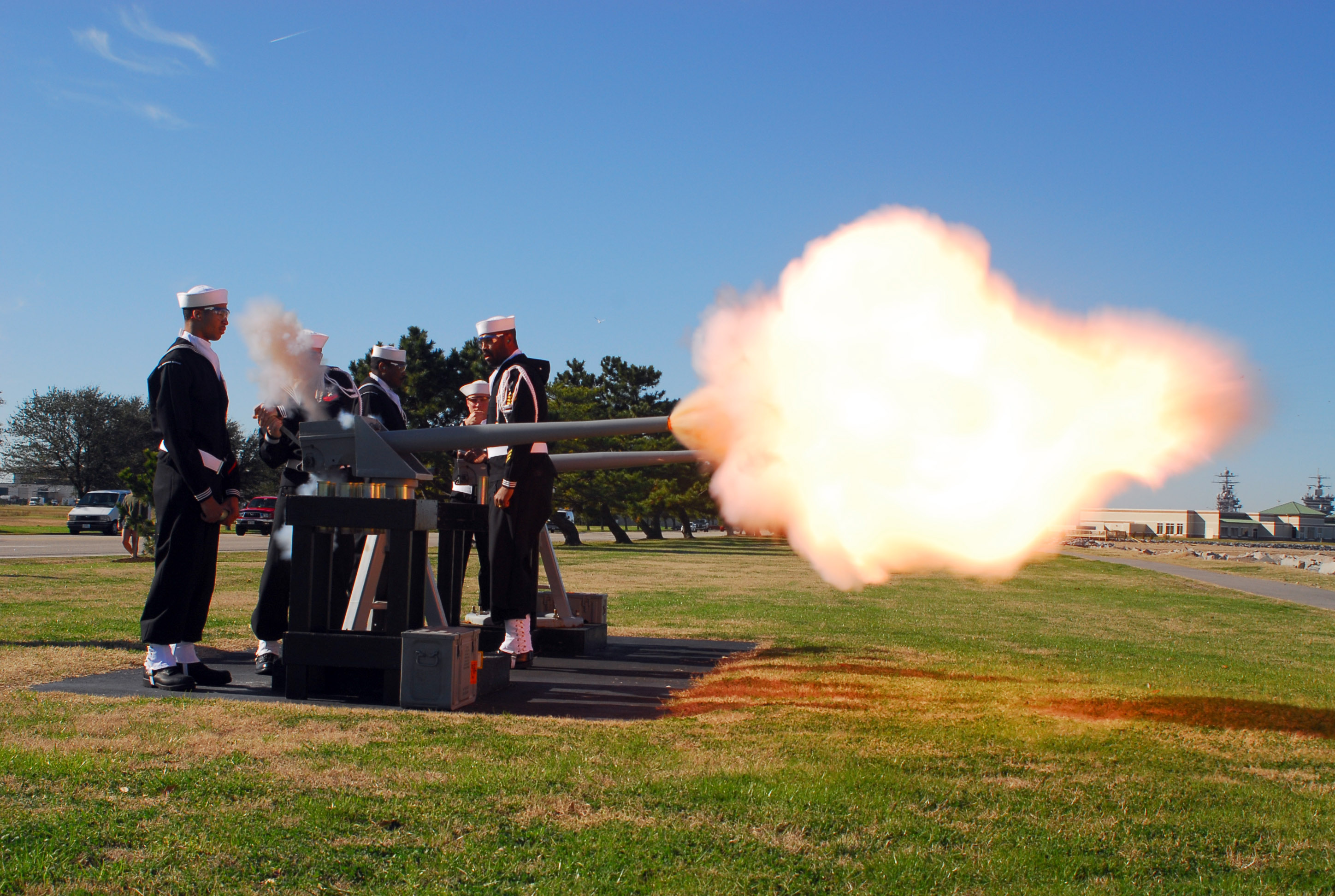
The U.S. Navy Munitions Command, detachment Sewell's Point, performs a 21-gun salute at Iowa Point in honor of former President Gerald R. Ford's death a few days prior.

U.S. Army howitzers render a 21-gun salute in honor of South African president Nelson Mandela during a state visit by him to the U.S. capital of Washington, D.C. in 1994. 21-gun salutes are often rendered in honor of prominent or important people, such as heads of state.

A 21-gun salute is the most commonly recognized of the customary gun salutes that are performed by the firing of cannon or artillery as a military honor. As naval customs evolved, 21 guns came to be fired for heads of state, or in exceptional circumstances for heads of government. While the 21-gun salute is the most commonly recognized, the number of rounds fired in any given salute will vary depending on the conditions. Circumstances affecting these variations include the particular occasion and, in the case of military and state funerals, the branch of service, and rank (or office) of the person to whom honors are being rendered, with the number decreasing with the rank.

== History ==
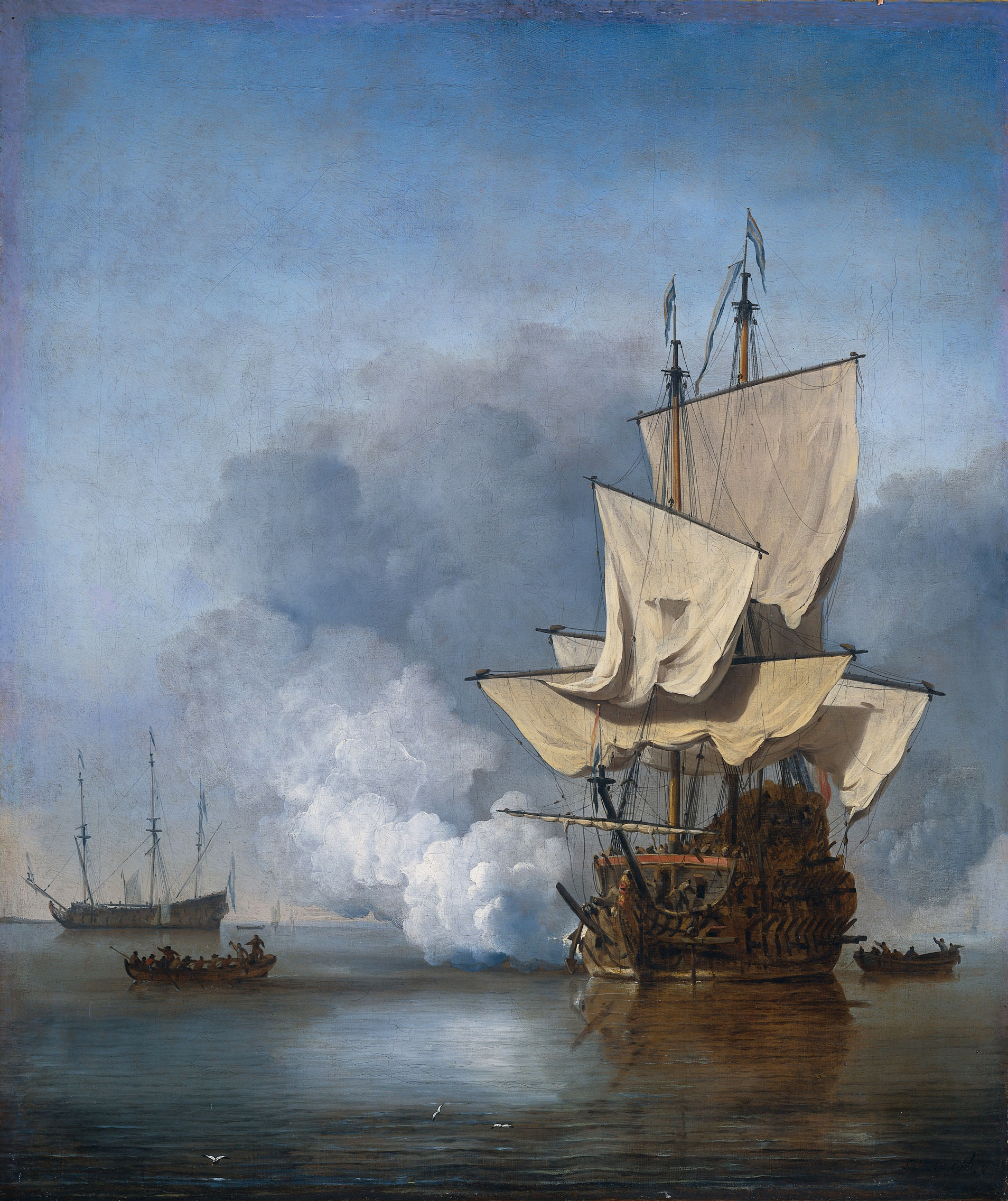
A Dutch man-of-war firing a salute. The Cannon Shot, painting by Willem van de Velde the Younger.

The custom stems from naval tradition in the sixteenth century, when a warship would show its peaceful intent by firing its cannons harmlessly out to sea until its ammunition was depleted. Since cannons then required a considerable time to reload, the ship was effectively disarmed, signifying the lack of hostile intent. In the earliest days, seven guns was the recognized British national salute. The early regulations stated that although a ship would fire only seven guns, the forts ashore would fire three shots to each one shot afloat, hence the number 21.

Odd numbers were chosen, as even numbers indicated a death.

== By country ==
=== Canada ===
(British) royal family members, as well as foreign heads-of-state, and the Governor General of Canada are given a 21-gun salute.

The prime minister, heads of foreign missions, foreign heads of government, and the Vice President of the United States are entitled to a 19-gun salute.

A 17-gun salute is given to the Canadian Minister of National Defence when visiting a saluting station (limited to once a year), as well as foreign ministers of defence.

Before they were abolished in 1968 by the Trudeau government, royal salutes were fired in Ottawa, the provincial capitals, and Montreal and Vancouver also on the Queen's Accession Day (6 February), the Queen's actual birthday (21 April), the Queen's Coronation Day (2 June), the Birthday of the Duke of Edinburgh (10 June), and the Birthday of Queen Elizabeth the Queen Mother (4 August).

The number of gun salutes for funerals are based on the status of the deceased person.

=== China ===
21-gun salutes are fired when welcoming heads of state to China, e.g. presidents, monarchs, governors-general. 19-gun salutes are fired when welcoming heads of government to China, e.g. prime ministers, chancellors, etc.

12-gun salutes are fired in three-volley form every year during commemorations of the repatriation of Chinese People's Volunteers soldiers from South Korea.

The number of gun salutes fired at military parades depends on how many years of a specific event it is commemorating. For example, a 100-gun salute was fired at the CPC Centenary flag raising ceremony in 2021. The gun salute, regardless of how many salvos are fired, is performed during the opening of parades to accompany, since 1999, the march-in of the flag raising party from the Monument of People's Heroes to the national flagpole at the south end of Tiananmen Square.

=== Denmark ===
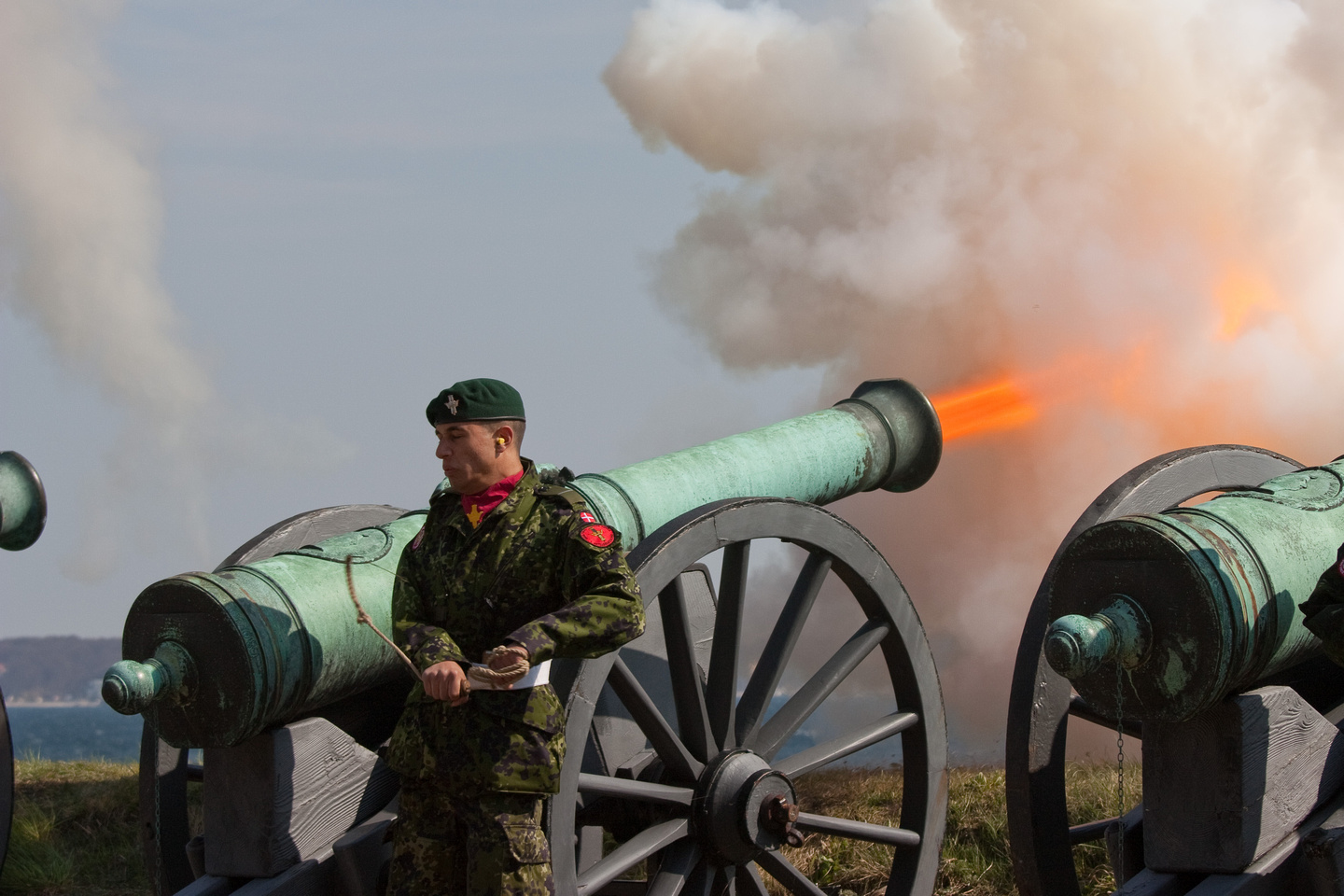
21-gun salute from Kronborg Castle to mark the 69th birthday of Queen Margrethe II

The day after the birth of Princess Benedikte in 1944 which took place during Nazi Germany's Occupation of Denmark, members of the Danish resistance group Holger Danske performed a salute of 21 bombs in the Ørstedsparken public park in central Copenhagen as a reference to the traditional 21-gun salute performed at the occasion of royal births.

=== Egypt ===
A 21-gun salute was used during the Parade of the Pharaohs (also called the Golden Parade) on 3 April 2021, when the mummies of Ancient Egyptian pharaohs were transferred to their new museum in Giza. Most of the mummies belonged to the New Kingdom period, which ruled Egypt between 1539 BC to 1075 BC. A 21-gun salute was used during the funeral of former Egyptian president Hosni Mubarak in February 2020. A 21 gun salute was used after President Abdel Fattah el-Sisi was sworn in on 8 June 2014. A final 21-gun salute was also fired to honor King Farouk prior to his embarking on the yacht Mahrousa that brought him to exile in Italy in 1952.

=== France ===
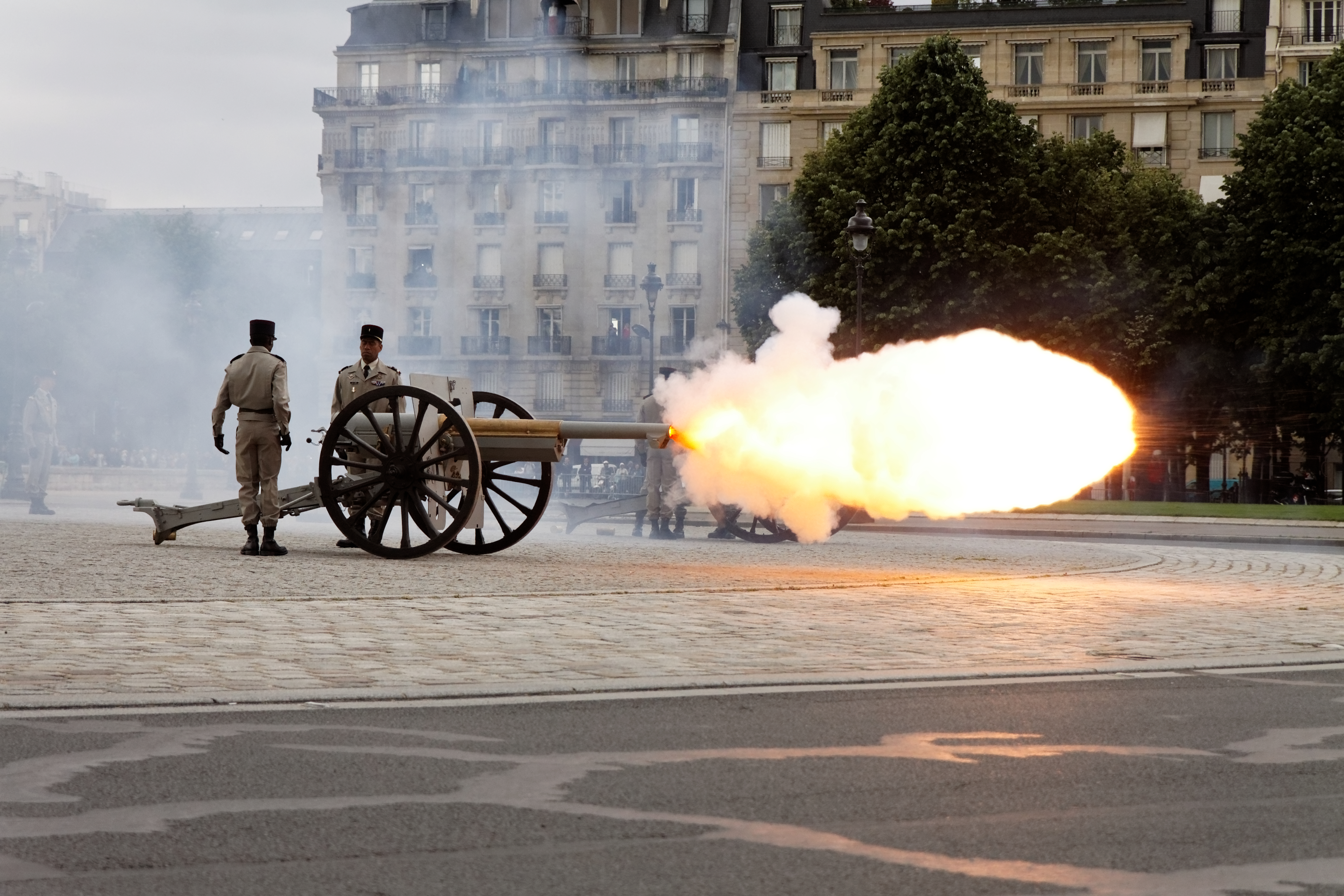
75mm gun firing 21 shots near Les Invalides for the inauguration of François Hollande as President of the French Republic

The 21-gun salute is accorded to the French president, forming part of his "military honors" (honneurs militaires). The salute is given during the inauguration ceremony (by two 75mm guns) and during naval visits. These honors are extended to foreign heads of state during state visits.

=== India ===
During the British Raj, India developed a formal hierarchical system of gun salutes. At the time of Indian independence in 1947, the hierarchy of salutes within British India stood as follows:

Number of guns	Recipients
101 (Imperial Salute)	The King-Emperor of India
31 (Royal Salute)	The Queen-Empress and the Members of the Royal Family; The Viceroy and Governor-General of India
21	Heads of state; Foreign sovereigns and members of their families
19	Heads of government; Governor-General of Portuguese India; Ambassadors; Commander-in-Chief, India (holding the rank of Field Marshal)
17	Governors of the Bombay, Madras and Bengal Presidencies; Governors of Indian Provinces; Governor of French India; Envoys Extraordinary and Ministers Plenipotentiary; Commander-in-Chief, India (holding the rank of General); Admirals, Generals and Air Chief Marshals
15	Lieutenant-Governors of Indian Provinces; Plenipotentiaries and Envoys; Ministers Resident; Commander-in-Chief, East Indies Fleet; Flag Officer Commanding Royal Indian Navy (rank of Vice-Admiral); Air Officer Commanding-in-Chief, Air Forces in India (rank of Air Marshal); Army Commanders with the rank of Lieutenant-General; Vice-Admirals, Lieutenant-Generals and Air Marshals
13	Chief Commissioners of Indian Provinces; Residents (1st Class); Residents (2nd Class); Flag Officer Commanding Royal Indian Navy (rank of Rear-Admiral); Air Officer Commanding-in-Chief, Air Forces in India (rank of Air Vice-Marshal); Major Generals commanding Districts; Rear-Admirals, Major-Generals and Air Vice-Marshals
11	Political Agents; Consuls-General; Chargés d'Affaires; Brigade Commanders (including Major-Generals if commanding a Brigade); Commodores, Brigadiers and Air Commodores
9	Governor of Daman; Governor of Diu (Portuguese India)

Prior to Indian independence in 1947, the Viceroy of India received a unique viceregal salute of 31 guns. After 1947, the 31-gun salute was retained for honouring the Governor-General of India (1947–1950).

In addition, 118 out of the roughly 565 princely states were classified as "salute states". The rulers of salute states were granted gun salutes ranging from 9 guns to 21 guns. This system continued till 1971 when privileges and Privy Purses of ex-rulers were abolished by the Government of India.

=== Indonesia ===
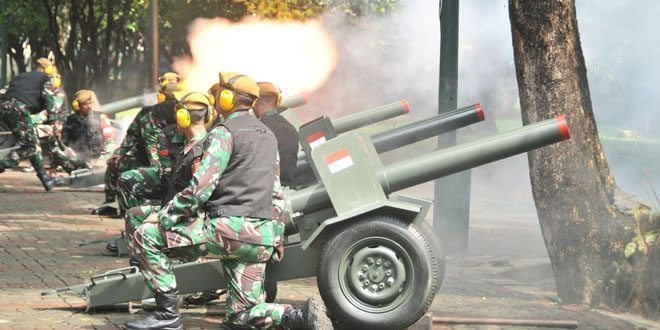
The 17-gun saluting battery from the 7th Field Artillery Battalion of the Indonesian Army during the national Independence Day ceremony

In Indonesia, the 21-gun salute is done during state visits of foreign heads of state visiting Indonesia.

The modified 17-gun salute is executed during the commemoration of the precise seconds of the proclamation of the independence of Indonesia on 17 August at 10:00 near the Merdeka Palace in Jakarta. It is also done in other cities in Indonesia during the independence day commemoration ceremonies.

=== Israel ===
In Israel the practice of gun salute has been eliminated due to the country having "suffered many terror attacks".

=== Singapore ===
A 21-gun salute is carried out for National Day Parades in Singapore by the Singapore Artillery during the presidential inspection of parade contingents.

In a rare occurrence, the 21-gun salute was given to the former Prime Minister and founding leader Lee Kuan Yew during his state funeral.

=== South Africa ===
In South Africa, a 21-gun salute is performed as part of the ceremonial honors for the President during the State of the Nation Address. The salute typically takes place following the President's arrival at Parliament and the playing of the national anthem.

=== Sri Lanka ===
Traditionally, the Sri Lanka Navy accords a 25-gun salute to the nation on the National Day, which is held on 4 February each year. The salute is fired from the ceremonial naval gun battery at Colombo Lighthouse - a tradition inherited from prior British influence. It began with HMCyS Vijaya of the Royal Ceylon Navy, the first warship of the navy according a 25-gun salute on 4 February 1951 with its single 4-inch gun.

=== Sweden ===
The number of rounds fired in a salute depends on the place and occasion. The so-called royal salute is 21 rounds.

Number of guns	Recipients
21	Nation; Head of State; Royalty
19	Prime minister Reichsmarschall; Minister of Foreign Affairs; Speaker of the Parliament; Swedish Ambassador; Minister of Defence; Commander in Chief
17	Admiral; General; Envoyé extraordinaire
15	Vice admiral Chief of Navy; Chargé d’affaires en pied
13	Rear admiral Chargé d’affaires ad interim
11	Rear admiral (lower half), one-star flag officer Consul-general
9	Captain
7	Consul
5	Vice-consul

Authorized saluting stations are:

- Skeppsholmen, (Stockholm)
- Kastellholmen, (Stockholm)
- Kungshall, (Karlskrona)
- Kungsholms fort, (Karlskrona)
- Fårösund, (Gotland)
- Bodens fästning, (Boden)
- Kusthöjden, (Härnösand)
- Vaxholms fästning, (Vaxholm)
- Oskar-Fredriksborg, (Vaxholm)
- Skansen Lejonet, (Gothenburg)
- Älvsborgs fästning, (Göteborg)

=== United Kingdom ===
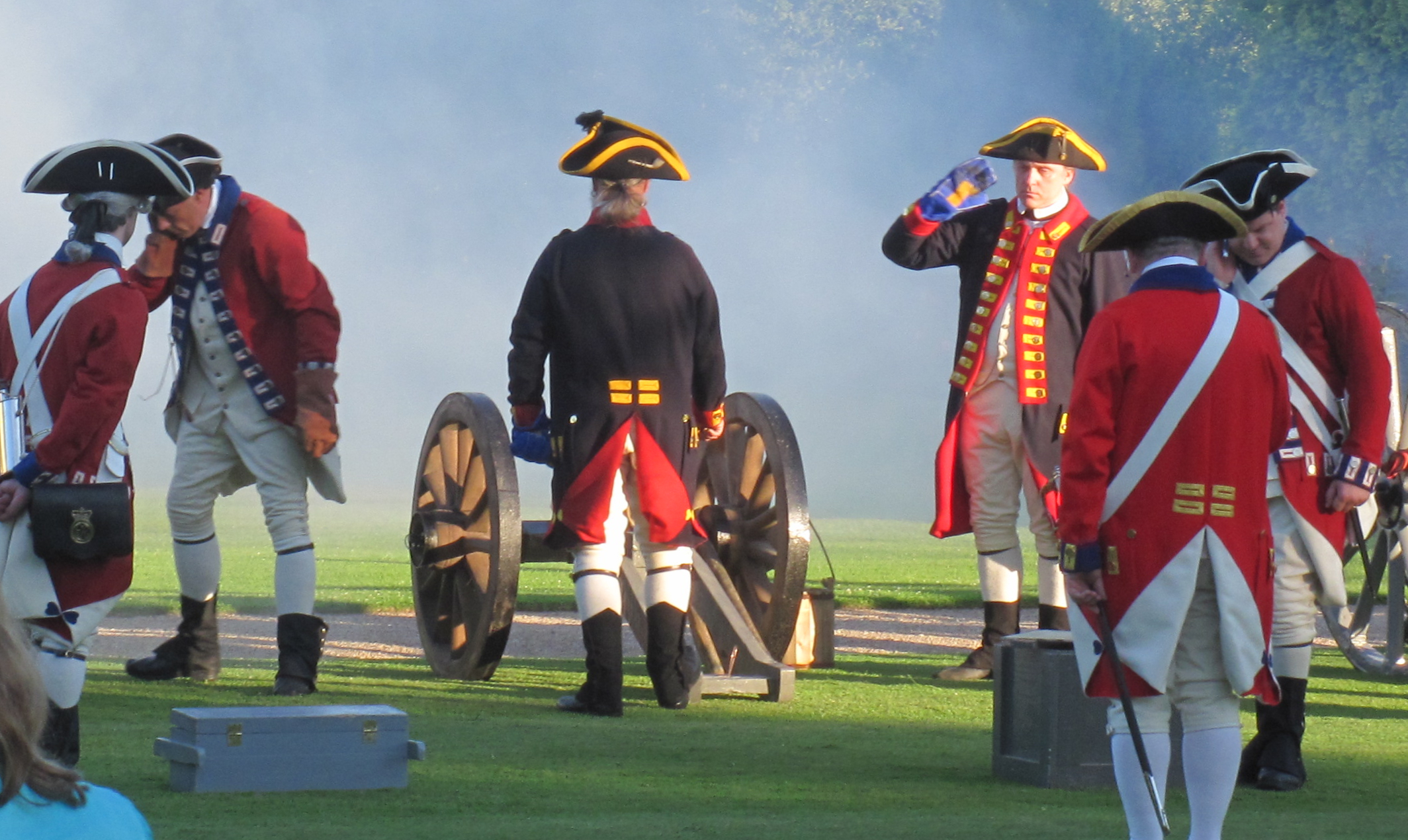
A 21-gun salute at a reception in Jersey commemorating the birthday of Queen Elizabeth II

The number of rounds fired in a salute depends on the place and occasion. The basic salute is 21 rounds. In Hyde Park and Green Park an extra 20 rounds are added because they are Royal Parks. At the Tower of London 62 rounds are fired on royal anniversaries (the basic 21, plus a further 20 because the Tower is a Royal Palace and Fortress, plus another 21 'for the City of London') and 41 on other occasions. The Tower of London probably holds the record for the most rounds fired in a single salute – 124 were fired when the Duke of Edinburgh's birthday (62 rounds) coincided with the Saturday designated as the Queen's official birthday (also 62 rounds).

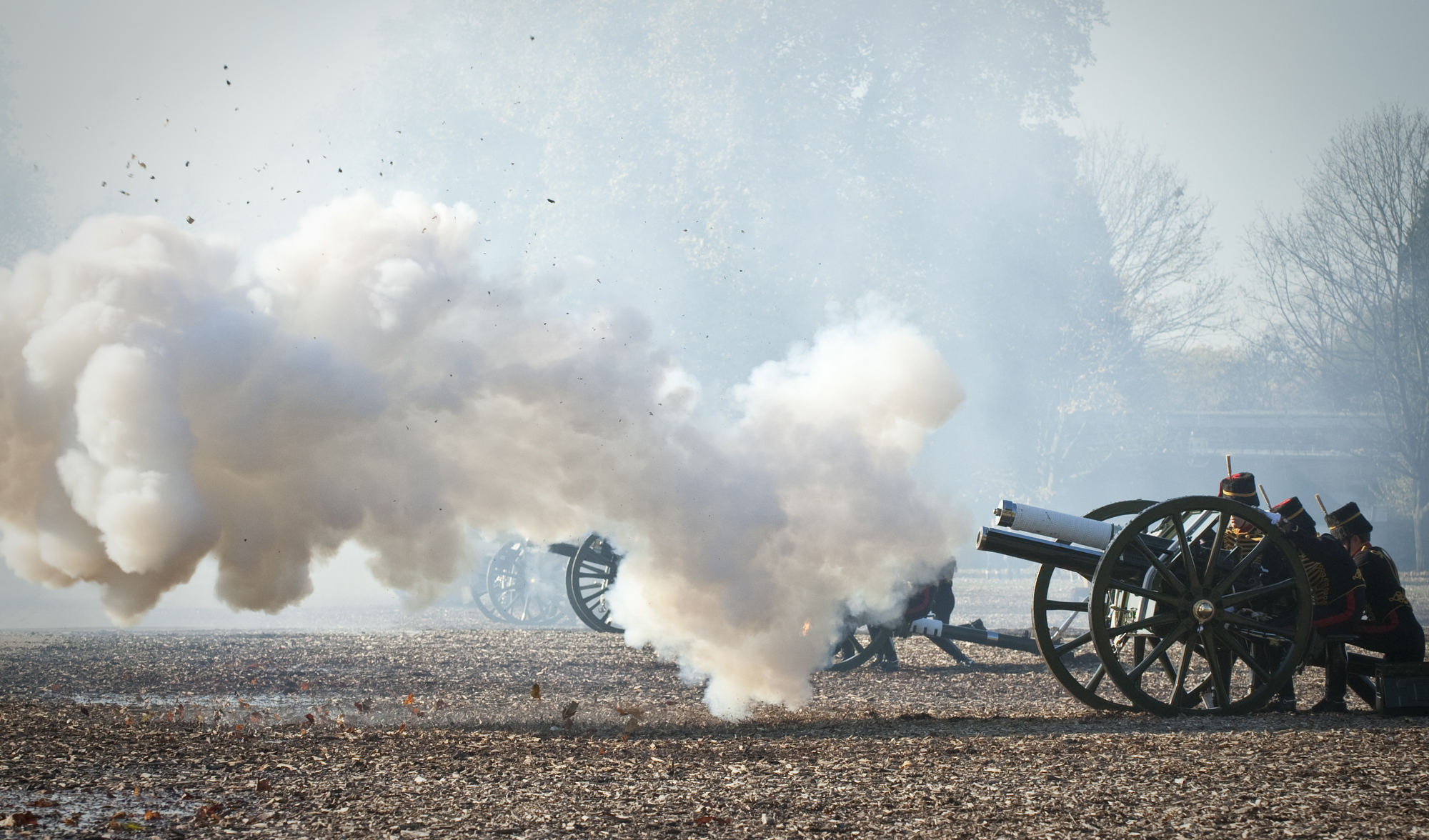
Gun salute in progress at Hyde Park by the King's Troop, Royal Horse Artillery.

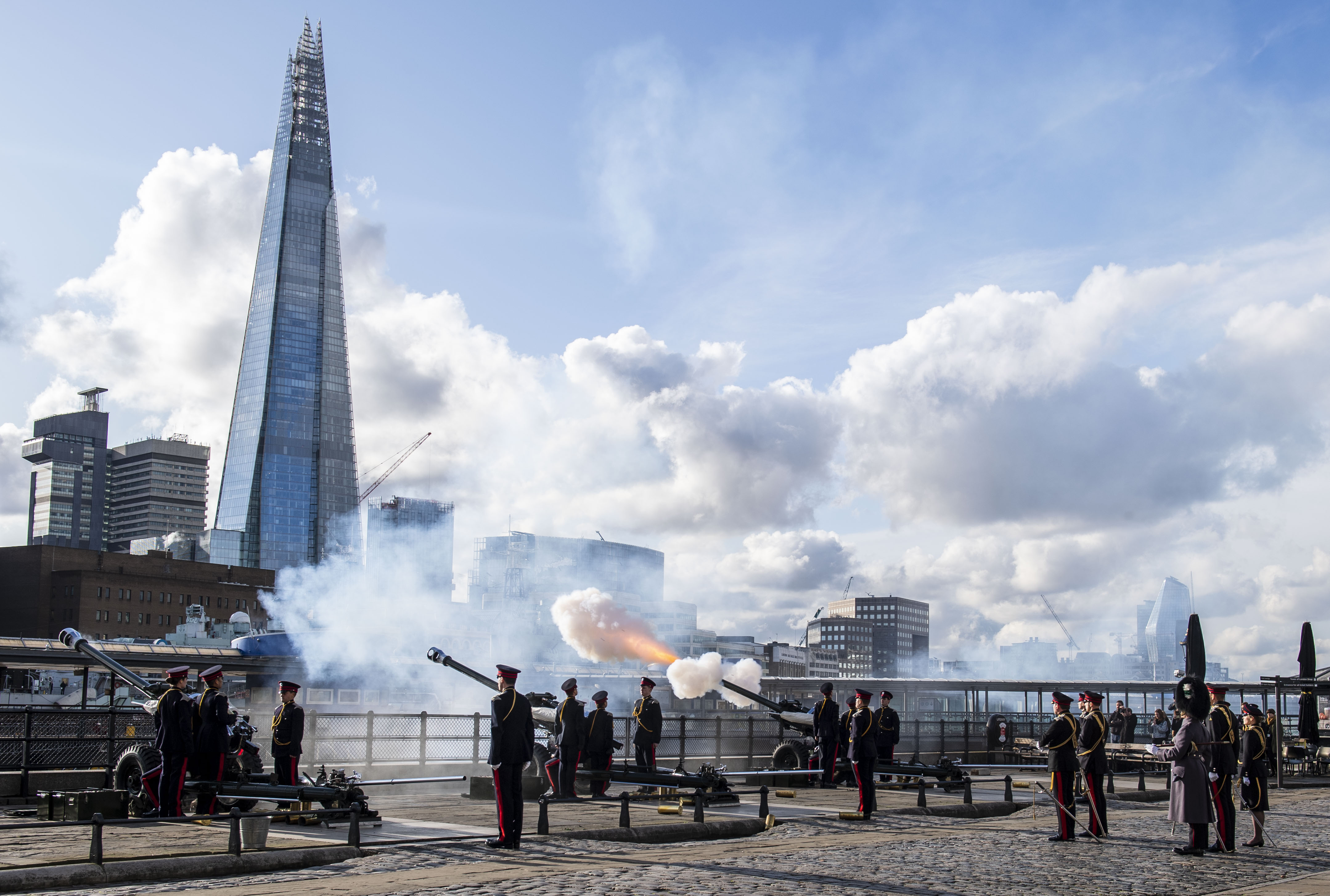
Salute at the Tower of London for the birthday of Prince Charles.

On 10 April 2021, a 41-gun salute was fired to mark the death of Prince Philip, Duke of Edinburgh, with the timing changed from 1 round every 10 seconds to 1 round every minute, resulting in a total duration of 41 minutes for the salute.

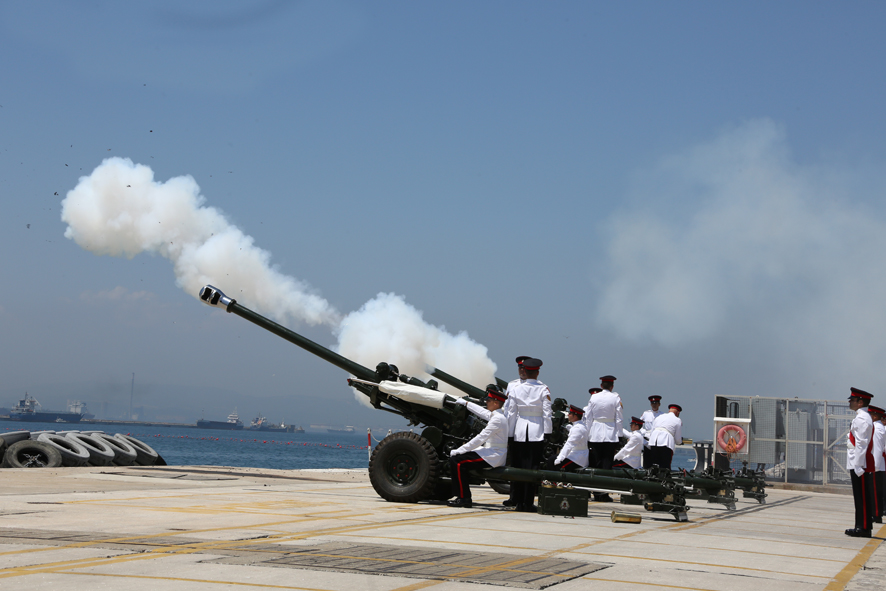
Gun Salute in Gibraltar on the birth of Prince George

When Queen Elizabeth II died, a 96-gun salute was fired to represent the years of her life. Since Charles III acceded to the throne, gun salutes are fired around the country to mark the birthdays of King Charles III and Queen Camilla.

Authorized military saluting stations are:

in England:

- Hyde Park, London
- The Tower of London
- Royal Arsenal, Woolwich
- York Museum Gardens
- The Army station in Colchester
- Royal Artillery Barracks, Larkhill
- Royal Citadel, Plymouth
- Dover Castle
- His Majesty's Naval Base, Portsmouth

in Scotland:

- Edinburgh Castle
- Stirling Castle

in Wales:

- Cardiff

in Northern Ireland:

- Hillsborough Castle

Salutes are also fired in Gibraltar.

=== United States ===
The practice of firing one gun for each state in the union was not officially authorized until 1810, when the United States Department of War declared the number of rounds fired in the "National Salute" to be equivalent to the number of states, which at the time was 17. The tradition continued until 1841 when it was reduced from 26 to 21.

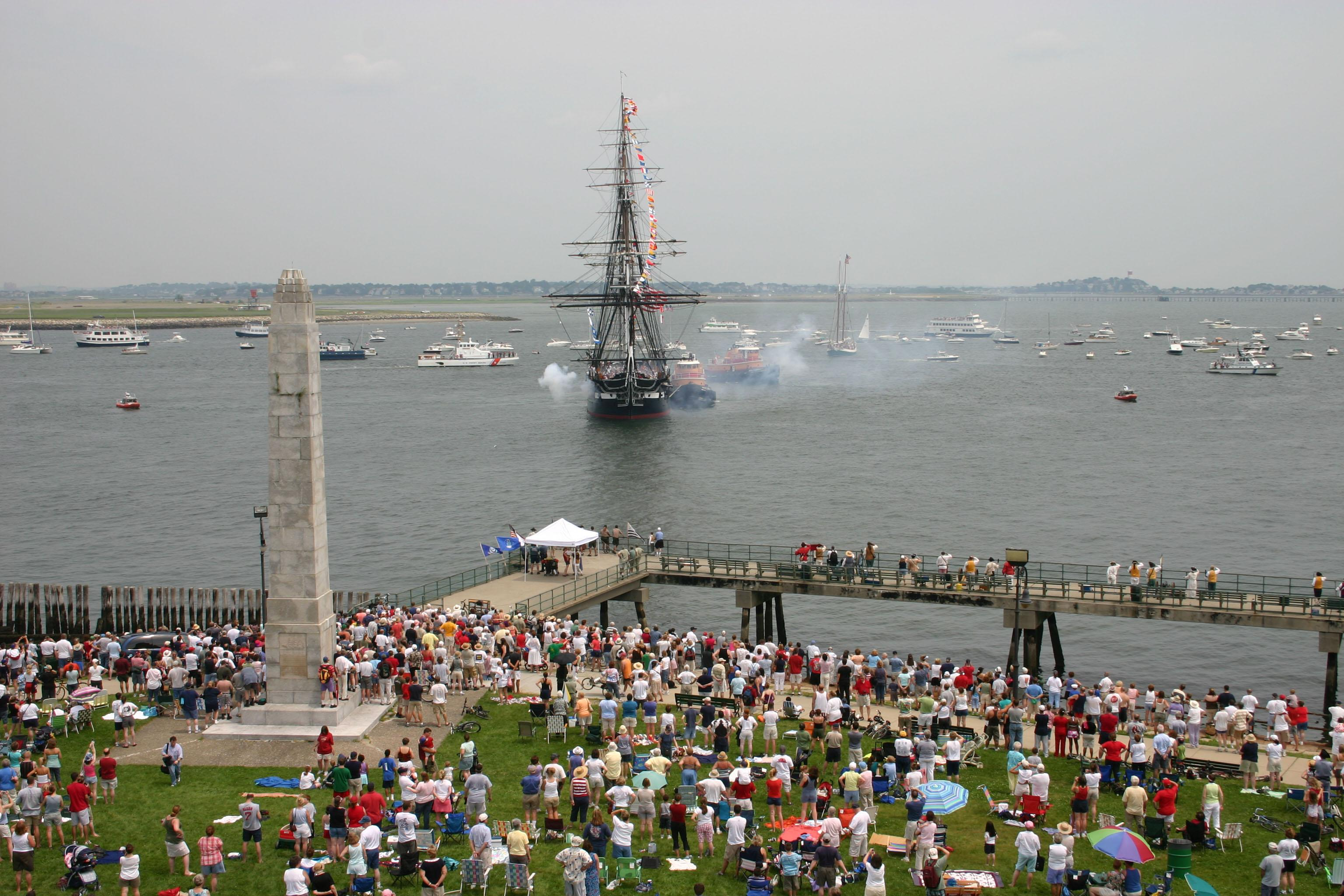
USS Constitution renders a 21-gun salute to Fort Independence during her Independence Day turnaround cruise

In 1842, the United States declared the 21-gun salute as its "Presidential Salute". While the "National Salute" had been formally established as the 21-gun salute, the current tradition holds the salute on Independence Day to have 50 rounds—one round for each state in the union. This 'Salute to the Nation' is fired at noon on 4 July, on U.S. military installations. The U.S. Navy recognizes Presidents' Day and Memorial Day with a 21-gun salute at noon.

In April 1914, during the Mexican Revolution, the Tampico Affair occurred, and escalated as a result of a twenty-one gun salute (or more specifically, the lack of one). Nine unarmed U.S. sailors were arrested in Tampico, Tamaulipas, Mexico, for entering an off-limit area at a fuel loading station. Despite them being released, the U.S. Naval commander demanded an apology and a twenty-one gun salute. The apology was provided, but not the salute, giving President Woodrow Wilson reason to order the U.S. occupation of the port of Veracruz.

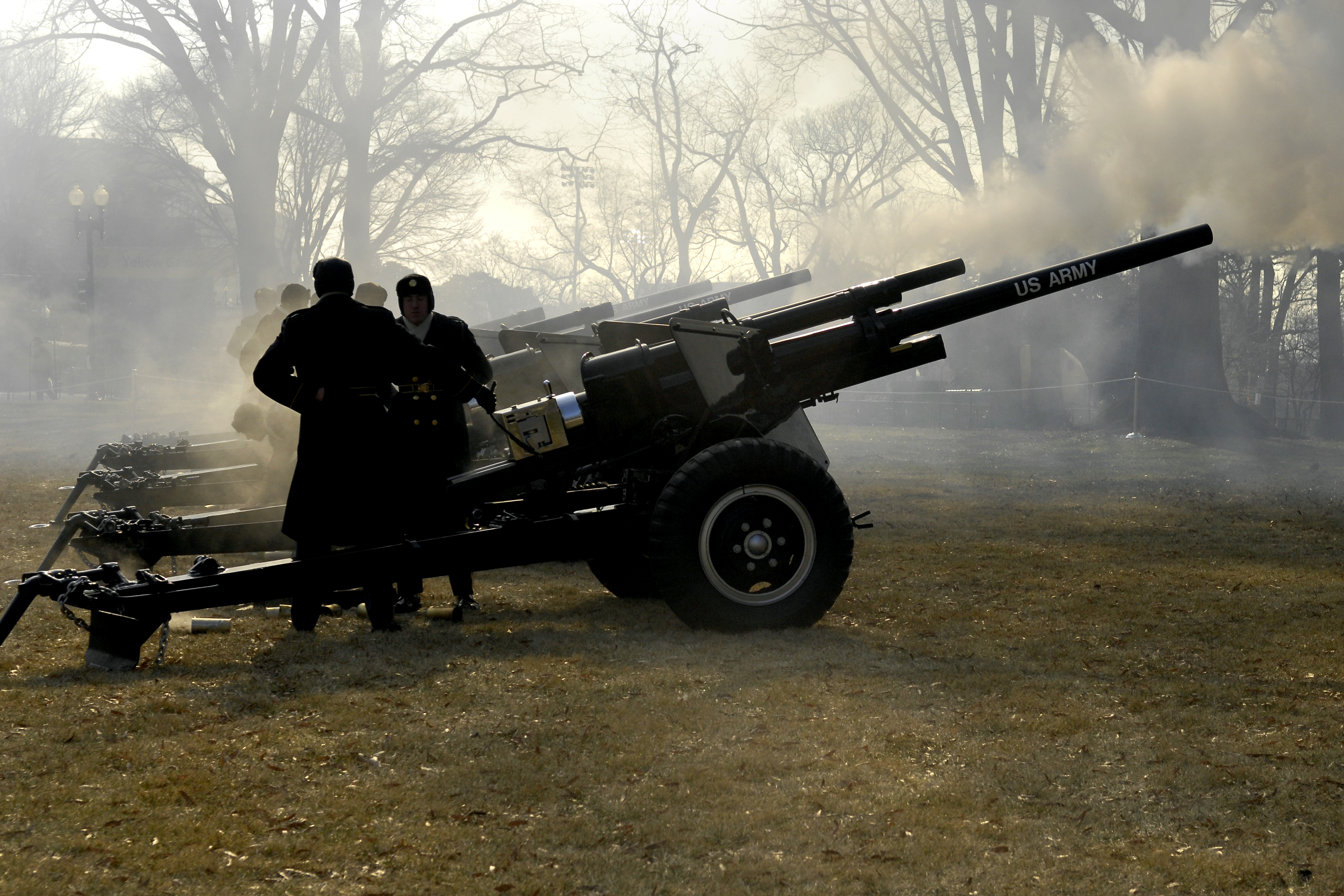
The Presidential Salute Guns Battery fires its M5 guns outside of the U.S. Capitol, during the 2009 Presidential Inauguration

Except for the President, former Presidents, and the President-elect, gun salutes are only given while the official is on military bases. The gun salutes fired in the United States are as follows:

Number of guns	Recipients
21	The President of the United States, former Presidents, and the President-elect; Foreign heads of state and members of a reigning royal family
19	The Vice President of the United States and members of the Cabinet; The Speaker of the House of Representatives and President pro tempore of the Senate; The Chief Justice of the United States; State Governors; The Secretary of Defense; The Deputy Secretary of Defense, the Secretary of the Army, the Secretary of the Navy, the Secretary of the Air Force, and Under Secretaries of Defense; The Chairman of the Joint Chiefs of Staff and Vice Chairman, the Chief of Staff of the Army and Vice Chief, the Commandant of the Marine Corps and Assistant Commandant, the Chief of Naval Operations and Vice Chief, the Chief of Staff of the Air Force and Vice Chief, the Chief of Space Operations and Vice Chief, the Chief of the National Guard Bureau and Vice Chief, and the Commandant of the Coast Guard and Vice Commandant; General of the Army, Fleet Admiral, or General of the Air Force (five star rank); American and foreign Ambassadors, High Commissioners, and others whose credentials are at least equivalent to those of an ambassador while in the country to which they are accredited; Foreign premiers or prime ministers
17	Governor-General or Governor of a Territory, Commonwealth, or Possession of the United States or an area under U.S. administration; Chairmain of a Committee of Congress; Assistant Secretaries of Defense, General Counsel of the Department of Defense, and Under Secretaries of the Army, Navy, or Air Force; Generals and Admirals (four star rank); American Ambasssadors in the United States on official business; Governors of a foreign territory or possession while in their jursidiction
15	Lieutenant Generals and Vice Admirals (three star rank); American Ambasssadors in the United States not on official business; American Envoys and foregin Envoys and Ministers accredited to the United States
13	Major Generals and Rear Admirals (RADM) (two star rank); American Ministers Resident and foreign Ministers Resident accredited to the United States
11	Brigadier generals and Rear Admiral (lower half) (RDML) (one star rank); U.S. Chargés d'Affaires and foreign Chargés d'Affaires and Consuls General accredited to the United States

==== Deaths of presidents ====
A U.S. presidential death also involves 21-gun salutes and other military traditions. On the day after the death of the president, a former president or president-elect—unless this day falls on a Sunday or holiday, in which case the honor will be rendered the following day—the commanders of Army installations with the necessary personnel and material traditionally order that one gun be fired every half-hour, beginning at reveille and ending at retreat.

On the day of burial, a 21-minute gun salute traditionally is fired starting at noon at all military installations with the necessary personnel and material. Guns will be fired at one-minute intervals. Also on the day of burial, those installations will fire a 50-gun salute—one round for each state—at five-second intervals immediately following lowering of the flag.

=== Vietnam ===
In Vietnam, the 21‑gun salute is the pinnacle of military homage, reserved for the most solemn state occasions. Under Decree 18/2022/NĐ‑CP, it is fired during a state‐welcome ceremony—after the visiting and host leaders step onto the honor platform and the military band plays the two national anthems—to formally salute a visiting head of state (or a head of state who also leads the ruling party). Beyond diplomatic receptions, this same 21-round gun salute punctuates Vietnam's highest national celebrations, such as the Victory Parade commemorating the Điện Biên Phủ triumph in 2024 and the grand ceremonies marking the 50th anniversary of national reunification. In both cases and in others, the gun salute is performed during the performance of the national anthem Tien Quan Ca.

The ceremonial salute is executed by a battery of M101 105 mm howitzers— including 15 primary saluting guns and 3 in reserve - of the People's Army of Vietnam. To complete the 21‑round honours by artillery, the battery's gunners fire their guns in seven salvos of three rounds each, ensuring the precision and solemnity of the military ritual.

== Media ==
Six shots from a 21-gun salute on 4 December 2005 celebrating the birth of the new Norwegian Prince, Sverre Magnus, the previous day

A 21-gun salute for 2009 Coronation Day of King Rama IX at Sanam Luang, Bangkok, Thailand, 5 May 2009

Instrumental performance of the Russian national anthem at the 2010 Moscow Victory Day Parade in Moscow's Red Square, resplendent with a 21-gun salute

A 21-gun salute in honour of Princess Bejaratana Rajasuda in her royal cremation ceremony, 9 April 2012

A 21-gun salute in honour of King Vajiralongkorn in 2024 Thai Royal Guards parade

== See also ==
- Celebratory gunfire
- Near-shore salute – custom of bringing a ship close to shore to "salute" those on land
- Three-volley salute
- Ten-bell salute
