= Old Colombo Lighthouse =

Old Colombo Lighthouse Clock Tower
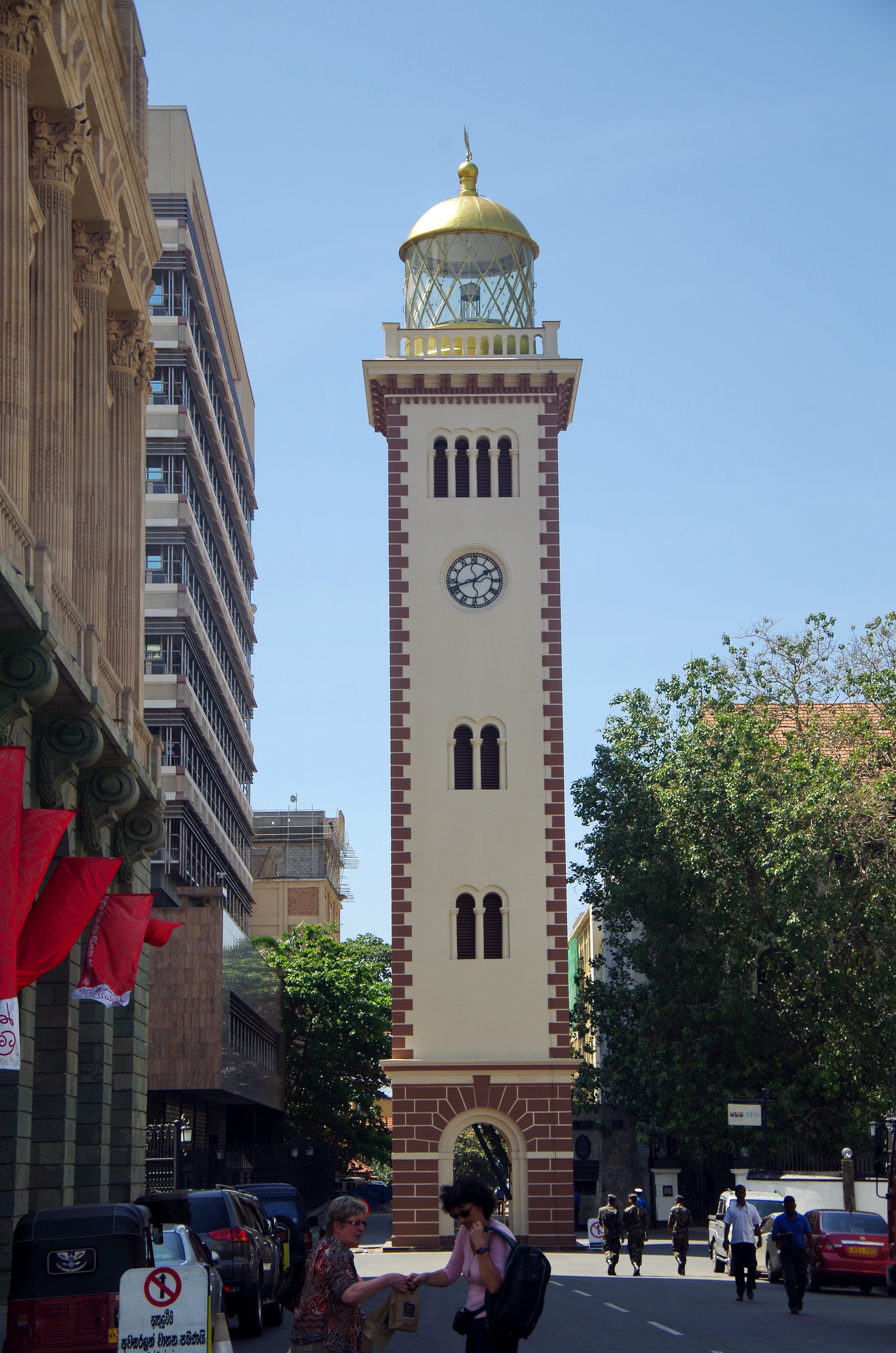
- The clock tower lighthouse
- Location: Fort; Colombo; Sri Lanka
- Coordinates: 6°56′5″N 79°50′34″E

Tower
- Constructed: 1829 (first)
- Construction: brick tower
- Automated: no
- Height: 29 m (95 ft)
- Shape: square tower with balcony and lantern
- Markings: white tower with stone trim, grey metallic lantern

Light
- First lit: 1865
- Deactivated: 1952

Old Colombo Lighthouse or Colombo Fort Clock Tower is a clock tower and was a lighthouse in Colombo. The lighthouse is no longer operational, but the tower remains and functions as a clock tower. It is located at the junction of Chatham Street and Janadhipathi Mawatha (formerly Queens Road) in Colombo fort.

== History ==
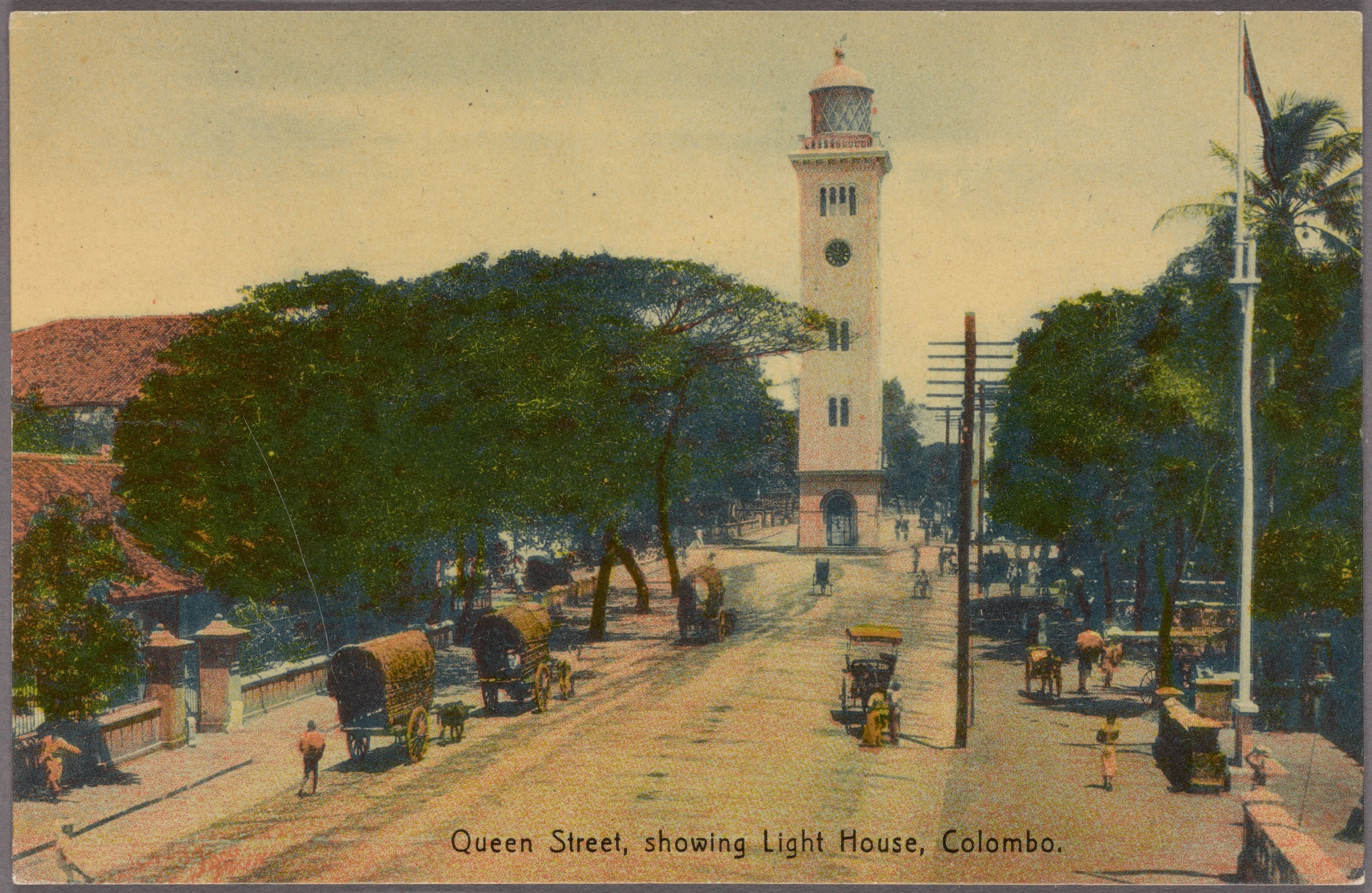
Queen Street, showing light house in 1907.

The tower was constructed as a clock tower in 1856-57 and completed on the 25 February 1857. The tower was designed by Emily Elizabeth Ward, the wife of Governor Sir Henry George Ward (1797–1860). The construction was undertaken by the Public Works Department, under the supervision of Mr John Flemming Churchill (Director General of Public Works). The 29-metre-high (95 ft) tower was the tallest structure in Colombo at that time. The original clock was commissioned for £1,200 in 1814 by the then Governor Sir Robert Brownrigg (1759–1833) but was kept in a warehouse, due to economic reasons, until 1857 when it was finally installed.

The lighthouse was deactivated after its light became obscured by nearby buildings and was decommissioned on 12 July 1952. The modern Galle Buck Lighthouse was erected on Marine Drive as its replacement.

== Features ==
The original Colombo lighthouse was located on a bastion on the ocean edge of the fort, was a neo-classical structure, with a 23 m (75 ft) wooden light tower rising from a two-storey circular brick building and surrounded by an elaborate colonnade. It was erected in 1829 and subsequently demolished with the removal of the fort ramparts between 1869 and 1871.

The clock mechanism was constructed by the renowned English clockmakers, Dent, who were also responsible for manufacturing the clock ('Big Ben') at Westminster Palace in 1852. The clock tower was formally commissioned on 25 March 1857. The bells in the clock tower consisted of a main bell of approx. 250 kg (550 lb) and two auxiliary bells of 152 kg (335 lb).

The navigational light was moved to the tower in 1867. The clockwork operated revolving dioptric light was constructed by Chance Brothers. The height of the focal plane above sea-level was 140 m (460 ft) and the light was visible to an eye elevated 61 m (200 ft) above sea level at a distance of 27 km (17 mi) in clear weather. The light was a triple flash at intervals of 30 seconds, each flash being of one second duration, and each long eclipse of 18 seconds duration. The light was lit using kerosene oil. In 1907 it was converted to gas. In 1933 it was replaced with a 1,500 candle power light powered by electricity.

In October 1913, the clock had to be replaced with the current clock, which has a six-foot dial glazed with opal glass for illumination and the clock tower was re-inaugurated on 4 April 1914.

== See also ==
- List of lighthouses in Sri Lanka
