= Colombo Lighthouse =

Lighthouse in Colombo, Sri Lanka

Colombo Lighthouse Galbokka Point
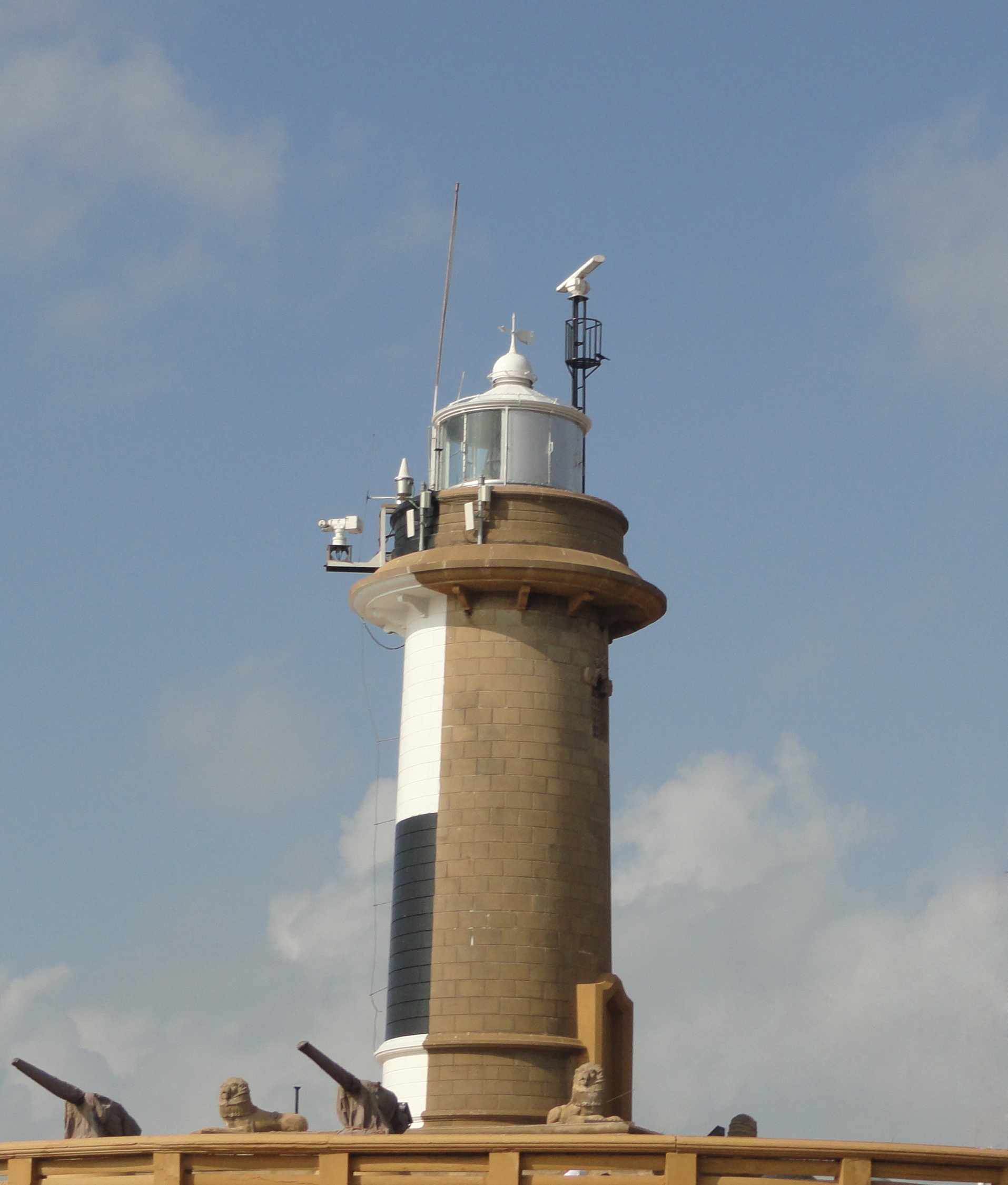
- Colombo Lighthouse
- Location: Galbokka Point; Colombo; Sri Lanka
- Coordinates: 6.936298°N 79.840766°E

Tower
- Constructed: 1820s (first)
- Construction: stone tower
- Height: 15 metres (49 ft)
- Shape: cylindrical tower with balcony and lantern on a 1-storey building
- Markings: unpainted tower, the seaward side is painted in a black and white checkered pattern
- Power source: mains electricity
- Operator: Sri Lanka Ports Authority

Light
- First lit: 1952 (current)
- Focal height: 26 metres (85 ft)
- Range: 15 nautical miles (28 km; 17 mi)
- Characteristic: Fl (3) W 10s.

Colombo Lighthouse is operated and maintained by the Sri Lanka Ports Authority. It is located at Galbokka Point south of the Port of Colombo on the waterfront along the marine drive, in Colombo fort.

== History ==
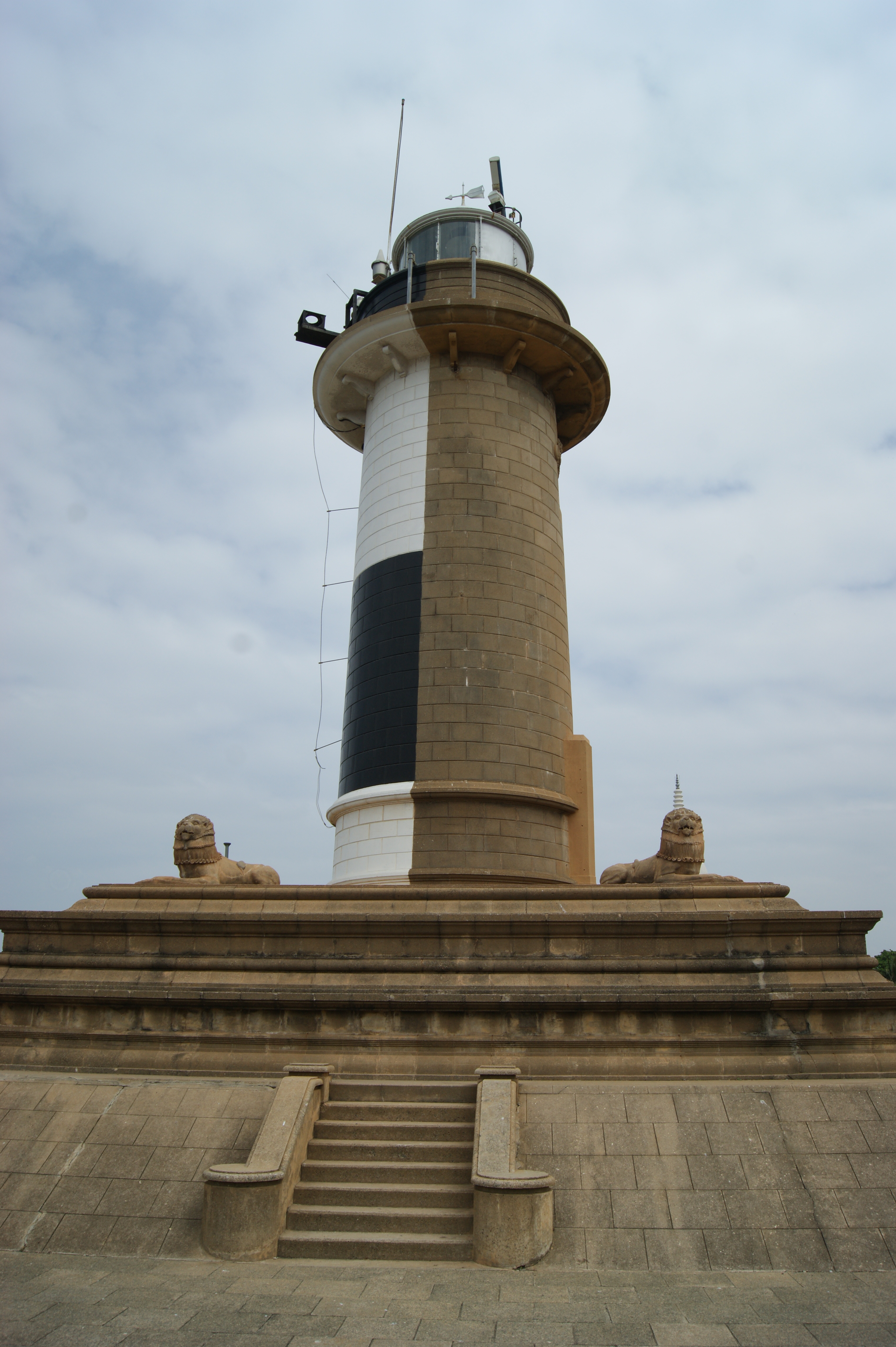
The Colombo lighthouse at Colombo Harbour

The current 29-metre-high (95 ft) lighthouse was built in 1952 after the Old Colombo Lighthouse was deactivated when its light became obscured by nearby buildings as part of the Colombo Harbor Expansion project. It was opened by Rt Hon D. S. Senanayake, the first prime minister of Ceylon. Built on a concrete base which is 12 m (39 ft) high, it has four statues of lions at its base.

Due to the panoramic view of the Indian Ocean it offered, it became a city landmark. With the escalation of the Sri Lankan Civil War, public access to the site was restricted. This was due to its placement in a high-security zone as it is across the street from the Naval Headquarters and close proximity of the Port of Colombo.

== Saluting battery ==
Located at its base is a naval gun battery that is used by the Sri Lanka Navy for its traditional gun salutes. By tradition the Navy accords a 25-gun salute to the nation on the National day, which is 4 February each year. The tradition originated when the sailors of the Ceylon Royal Naval Volunteer Reserve fired a 15-gun salute at the Galle Face Green on the first Independence Day on 4 February 1948. With the formation of the Royal Ceylon Navy, HMCyS Vijaya, the first warship of the navy according a 25-gun salute on 4 February 1951 with its single QF 4-inch naval gun. In 1952, two additional QF 4-inch (100 mm) naval guns were brought from the United Kingdom and mounted at Galle Buck Bay in the Colombo harbour in preparation of the Royal visit of Princess Elizabeth, which did not occur as she returned halfway due to the death of her father the King. Royal Ceylon Navy awarded a 56-gun salute on the day of the King's funeral. After HMCyS Vijaya was decommissioned its QF 4-inch naval gun was added to the battery. The guns were moved to the lighthouse and fired the gun salute since 2000. In 2000, three 2-inch (52 mm) guns were installed, having been gifted from the Indian Navy which were used to fire the gun salutes until 2020. In 2021, the independence day gun salute was fired from SLNS Samudura and the tradition has been naval ships after the Colombo Lighthouse became landlocked after the construction of the Colombo Port City.

== See also ==
- List of lighthouses in Sri Lanka
