= Old Colombo Dutch Hospital =

Historical building in Colombo, Sri Lanka

Coordinates: 6.93356°N 79.84356°E

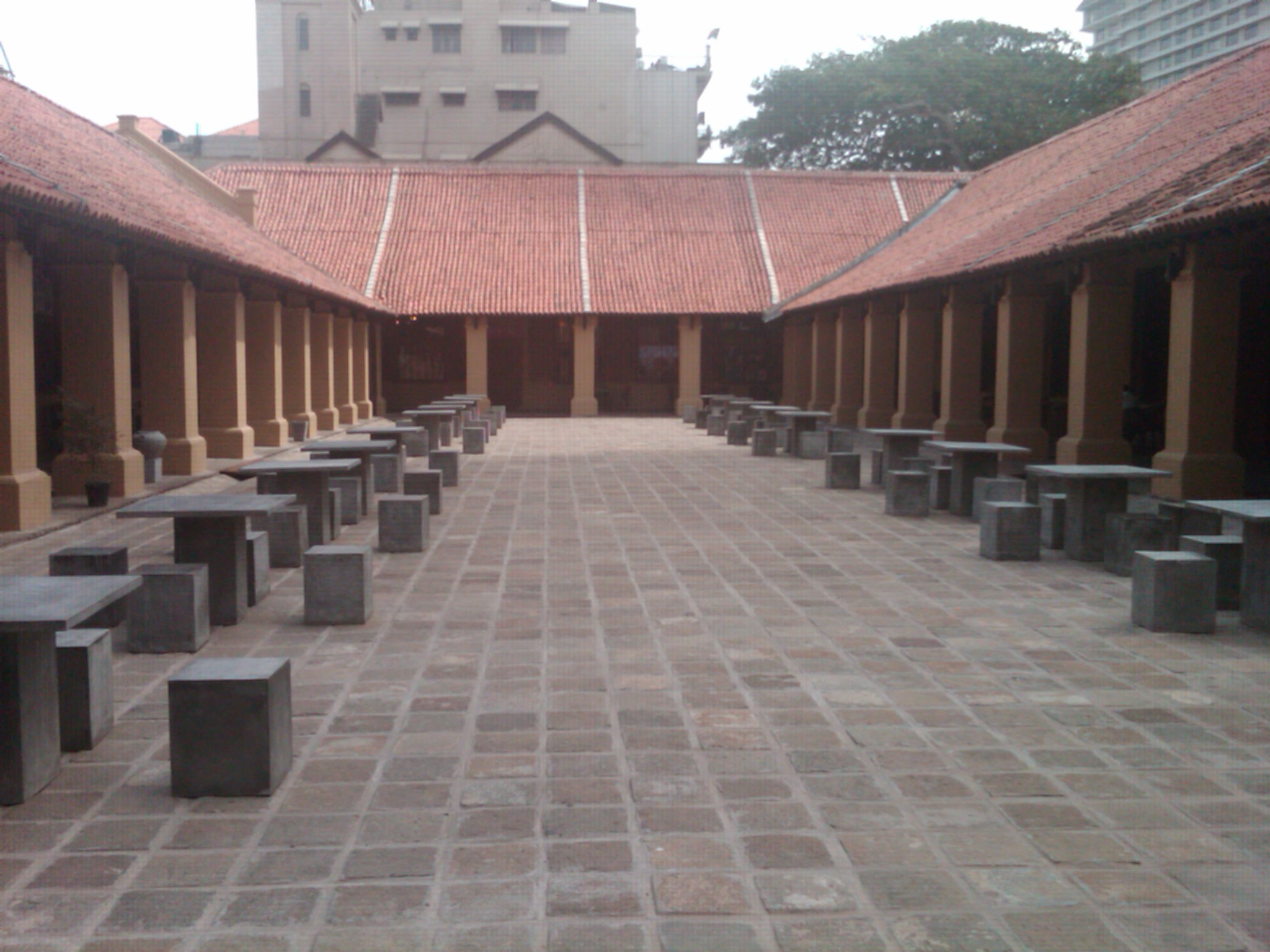
The inner courtyard of the Dutch Hospital shopping mall in Colombo, Sri Lanka.

The Old Colombo Dutch Hospital (known as The Dutch Hospital) is considered to be the oldest building in the Colombo Fort area dating back to the Dutch colonial era in Sri Lanka. It is now a heritage building and a shopping and dining precinct.

== History ==
=== Dutch Era ===
Built as a hospital by the Dutch, it has been used for several different purposes, over the years. It is believed to have existed since 1681, as recorded by German Christoper Schweitzer. The Dutch established the Colombo hospital to look after the health of the officers and other staff serving under the Dutch East India Company. The hospital's close proximity to the harbour allowed it to serve Dutch seafarers.

Most patients were provided with a mat, while the most ill were given a mattress. Patients clothing was imported from Java. The surgeon with the longest service at the Colombo hospital was Alleman. Alleman sought to improve conditions at the hospital, including increasing provisions. The most famous of all the surgeons who worked in the Colombo hospital was undoubtedly Paul Hermann, who served from 1672 to 1679. Herman has been described as the father of botany in Sri Lanka.

Paintings from the era show that it once had a canal running along what is now Canal Row lane. This canal was filled in by British colonists after their capture of the city.

=== Post Independence ===
The building was the Colombo Fort Police Station from the early 1980s to 1990s, prior to which it housed the Colombo Apothecaries. It suffered heavy damage in the LTTE attack that followed the Central Bank bombing in 1996.

In 2011, it has been transformed into a shopping and dining precinct, where the historic architecture has been preserved.

== Architecture ==
The building reflects seventeenth-century Dutch colonial architecture.

The building has five wings forming two courtyards. It is designed to keep out the heat and humidity and provide a comfortable environment within. Like many Colombo Dutch buildings of the era, the walls are 50 cm (20 in) thick. The structure features massive teak beams. The upper floor is located in the front wing and can be reached with a wooded staircase. This upper storey has a wooden floor. A long open veranda runs along the length of each wing of the building.

Paintings of the front and rear views of the Colombo hospital, done in 1771 by a Dutch artist—presumably Johannes Rach—are preserved in the Koninklijk Instituut voor Taal-, Land- en Volkenkunde at Leiden, in the Netherlands. These show that the building has changed little.

The original landscaping has disappeared.

== See also ==
- Dutch Ceylon
- Colombo
