= Fort (Colombo) =

Fort කොටුව கோட்டை
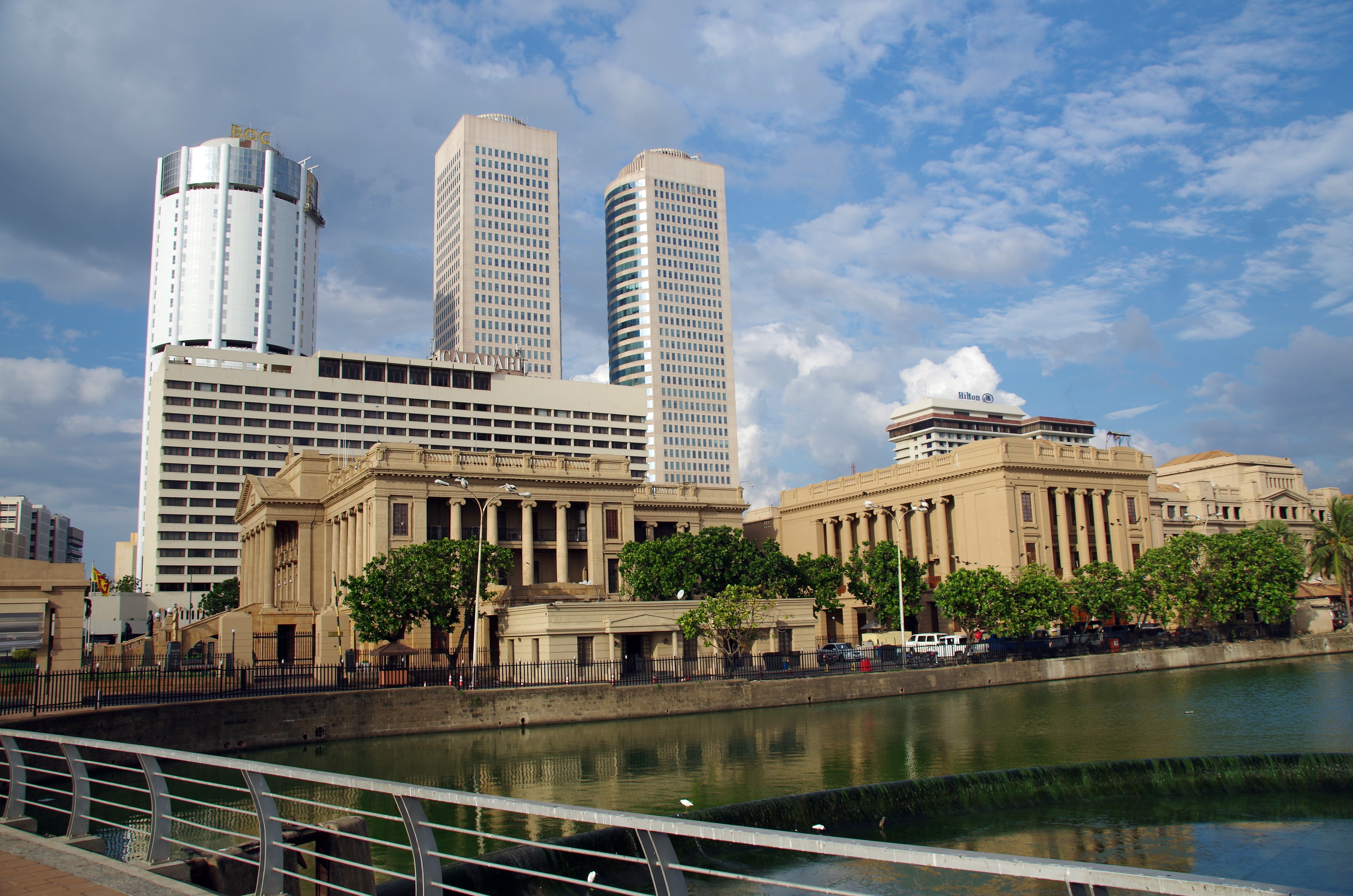
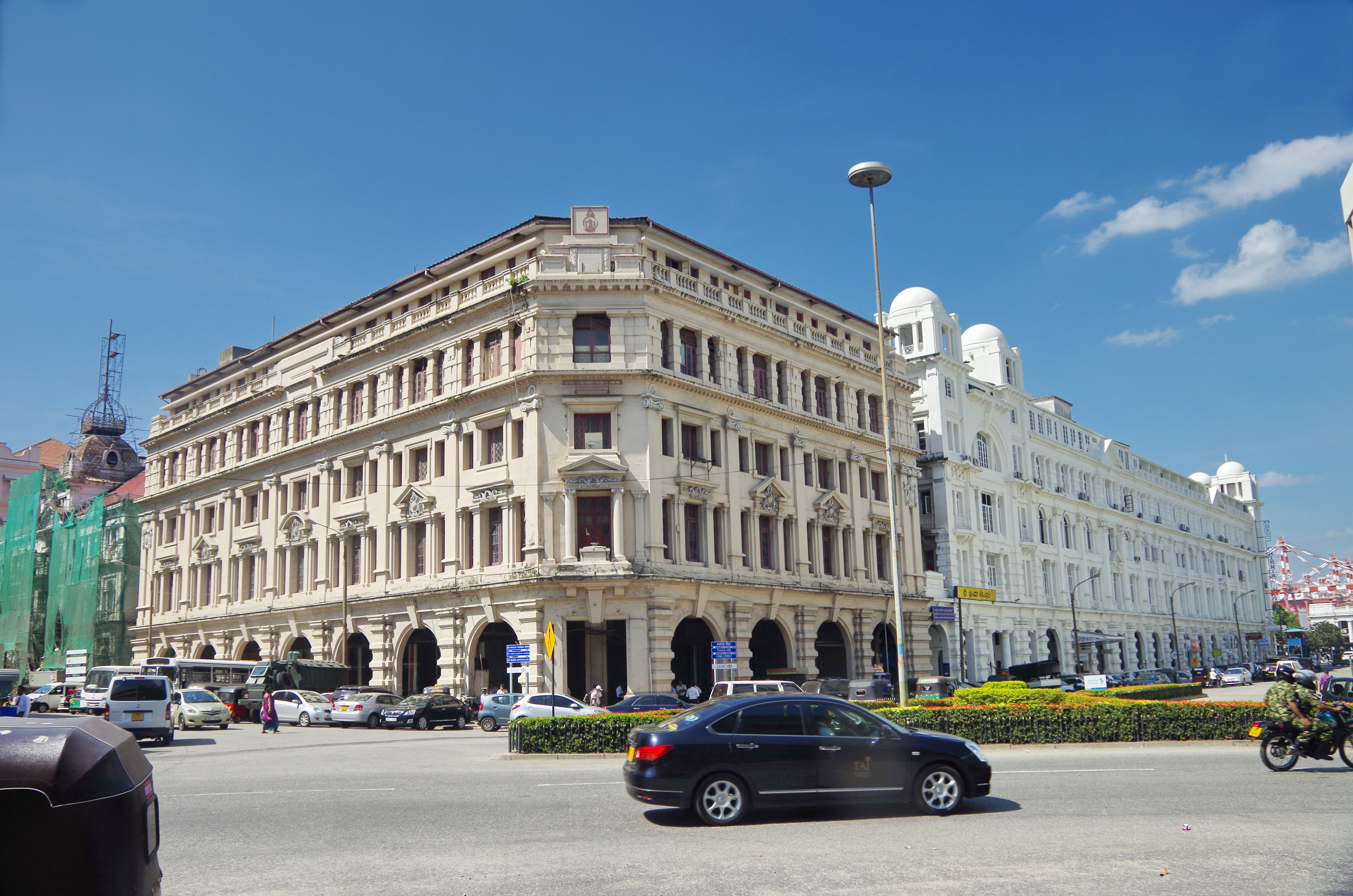
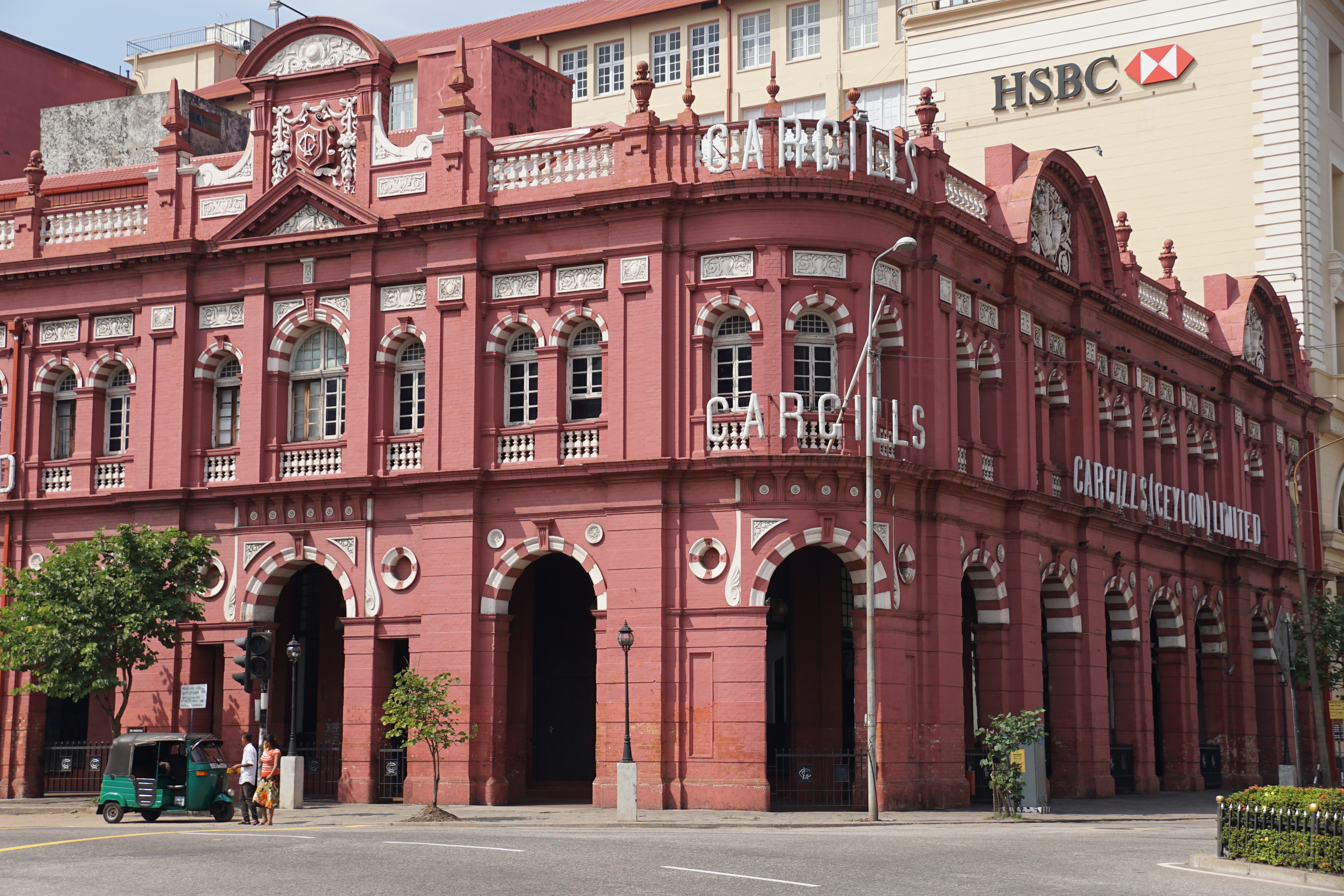
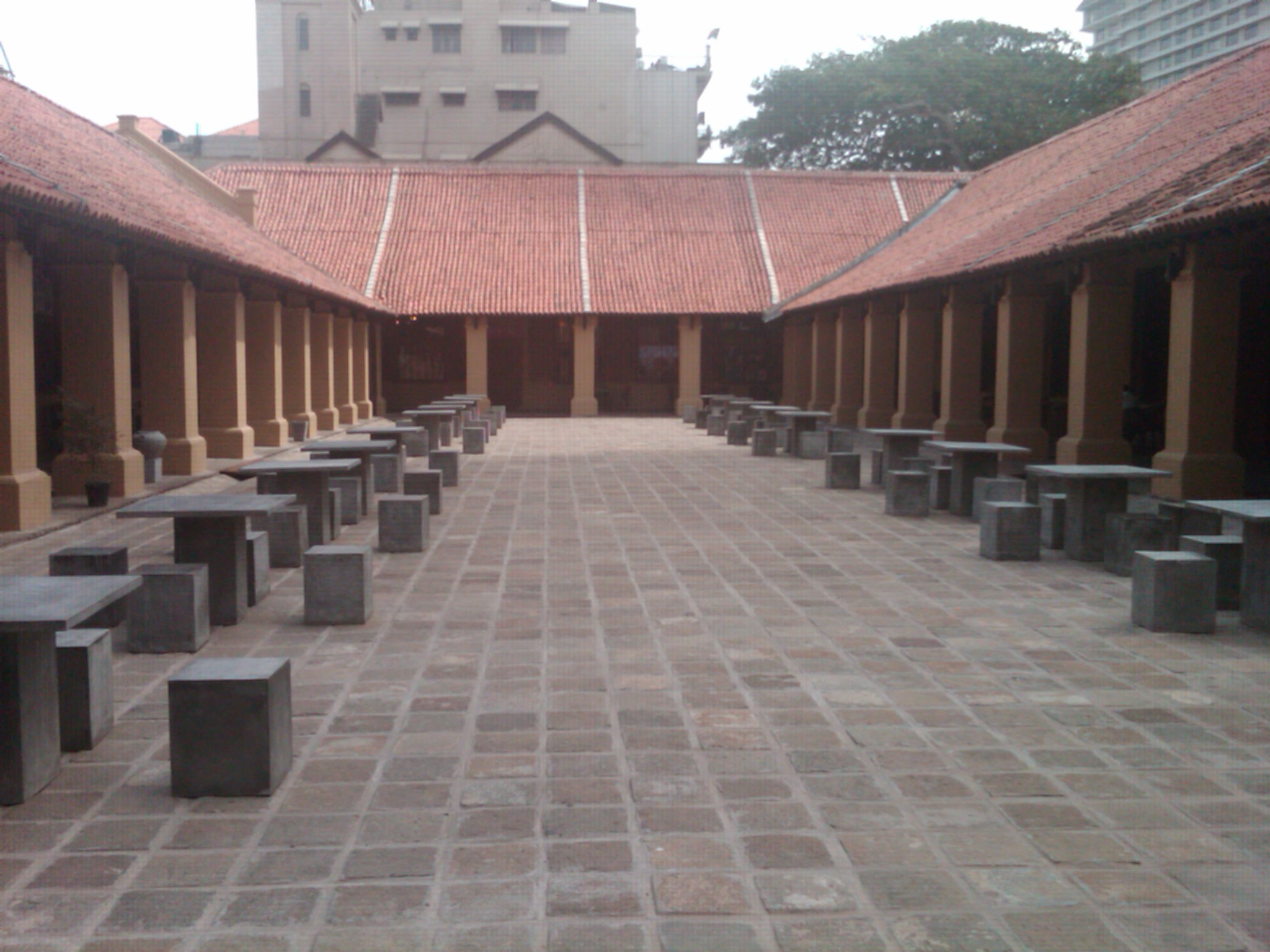
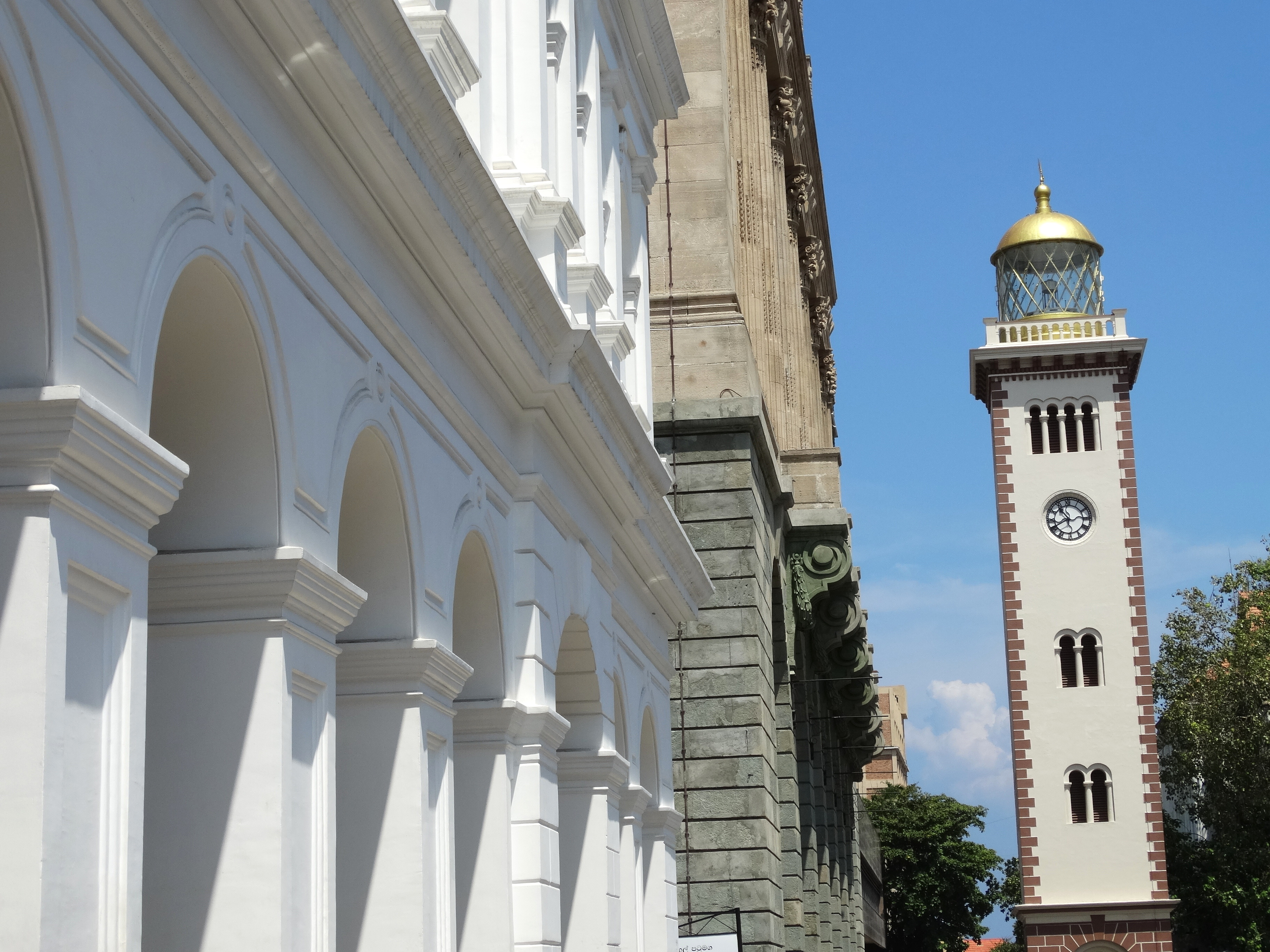
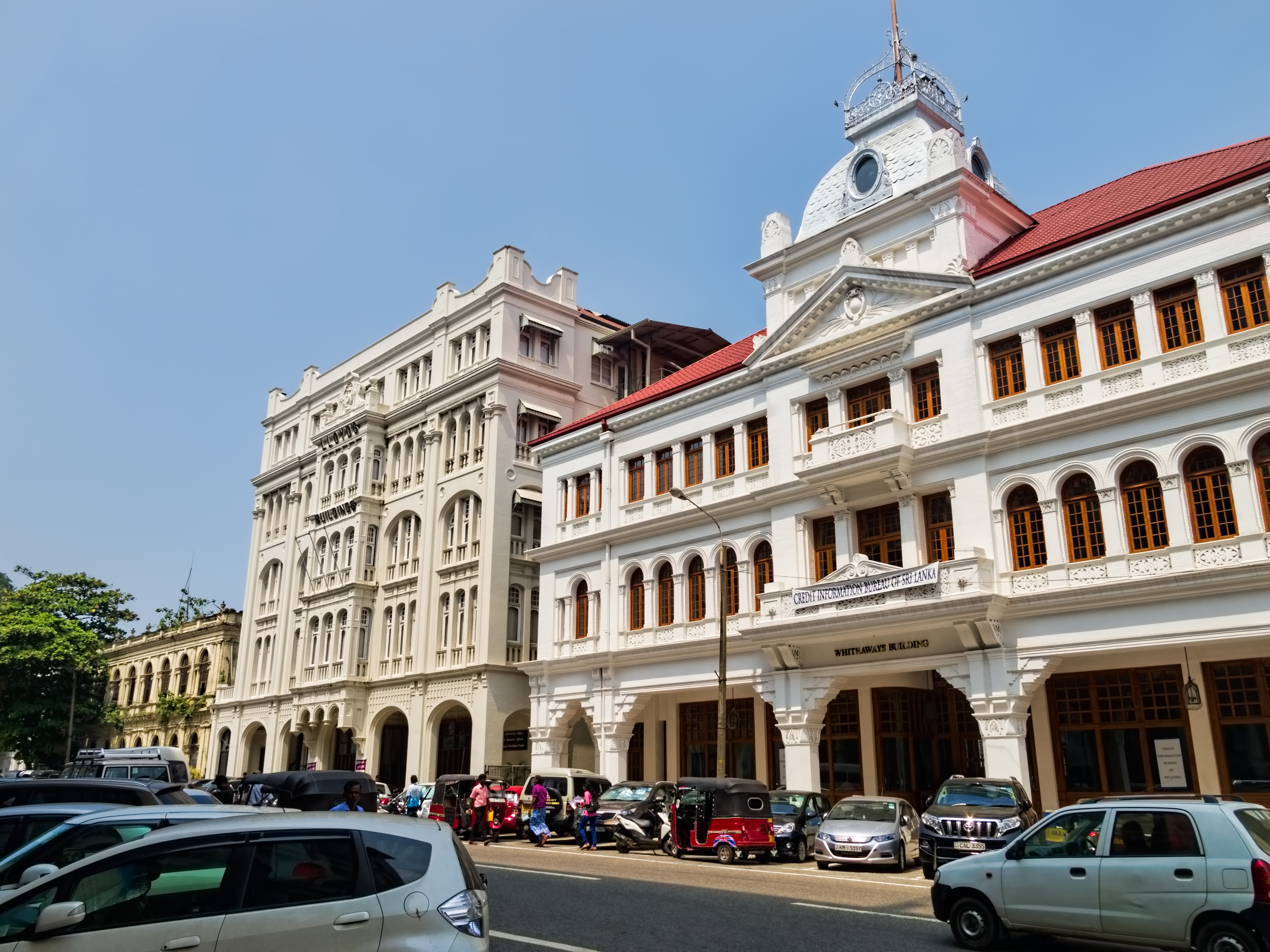
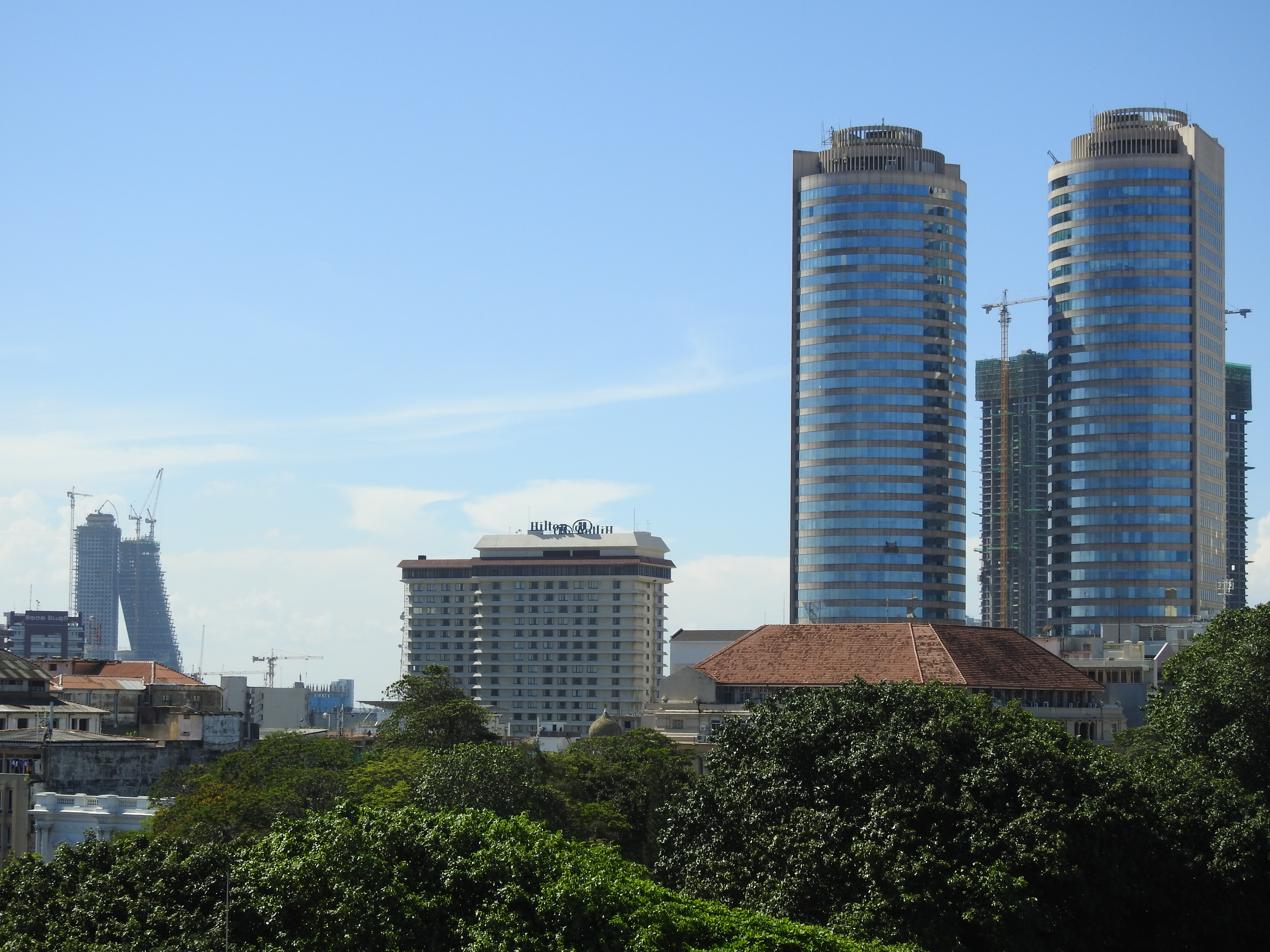
- From top left to right: Skyline of Fort including the Old Parliament Building in the foreground and Bank of Ceylon WTC twin towers in the background, Grand Oriental Hotel, Cargills department store, Old Colombo Dutch Hospital, Old Colombo Lighthouse, restored colonial-era buildings, the WTC twin towers and Hilton Colombo Hotel

- Location within Central Colombo Location within Sri Lanka
- Coordinates: 6°55′33″N 79°50′30″E
- Country: Sri Lanka
- Province: Western Province
- District: Colombo District
- Time zone: UTC+5:30 (Sri Lanka Standard Time Zone)
- Postal Code: 00100

Fort (Sinhala: කොටුව; Tamil: கோட்டை) is the central business district of Colombo in Sri Lanka. It is the financial district of Colombo and the location of the Colombo Stock Exchange (CSE) and the World Trade Centre of Colombo from which the CSE operates. It is also the location of the Bank of Ceylon headquarters. Along the foreshore of the Fort area is the Galle Face Green Promenade, built in 1859 under the governance of Sir Henry George Ward, the Governor of Ceylon (Sri Lanka) during British colonial era. Fort is also home to the General Post Office, hotels, government departments and offices.

== History ==
Known as Kolonthota, the area became notable as the site of the first landings of the Portuguese in the early 16th century and became one of their trading posts on the island. The Portuguese developed their trading post into a fortified base and harbour to extend their control of the interior of the island.

A detailed account of the first Portuguese settlement and fort can be found in the 1681 journal of Captain João Ribeyro;

"Colombo was at first only a factory palisaded round about; it was soon made more extensive, a small fort was built and at length it became a very pretty agreeable little town, with twelve bastions and an esplanade. For a long time the walls were only of taipa singella with a ditch which joined a lake and that lake shut in one third of the town on the land side; there were always 237 guns mounted, of from 10 to 36 lbs caliber. The town fronted a bay capable of containing a great number of small ships but they were always exposed to the north-wind; it was 1300 paces in circumference. Where the reef ran out, there was a small battery with a heavy piece of artillery which commanded the whole of the bay. The southern part of the town lay entirely open, being well defended on that side by the same reef."

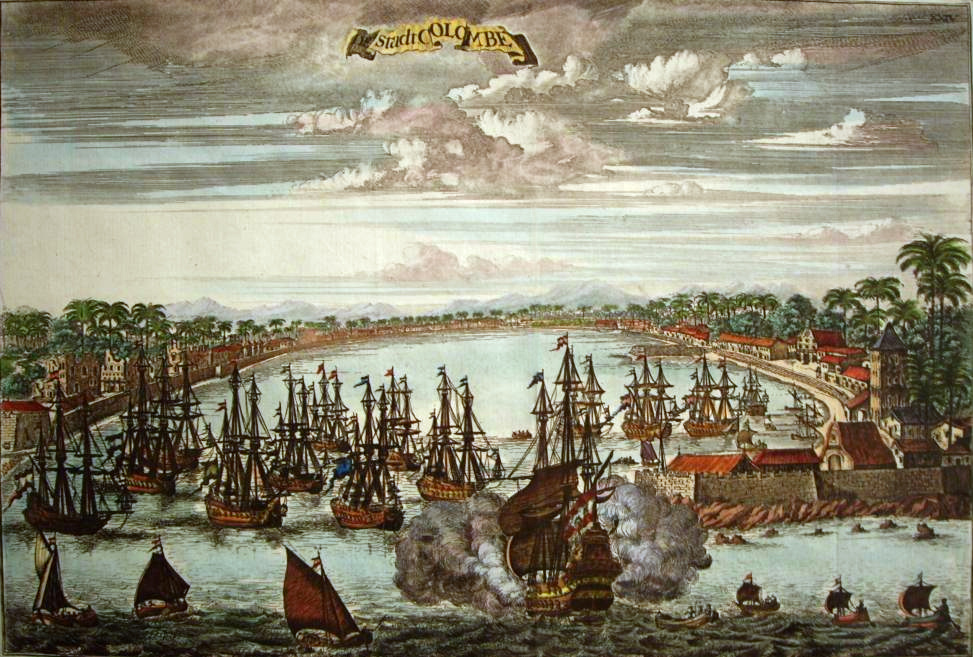
Dutch engraving of Colombo in about 1680

Of the population, it is mentioned that 900 noble families and about 1500 of lesser citizens resided at the time in Colombo. The town's religious missions are said to have been numerous; from several of Our Lady's, St. Lawrence's, Cordeliers, Dominican, Augustine, Capuchin, House of Mercy to a hospital.

The fort was besieged several times during the Sinhalese–Portuguese War, most notably in 1587, but was held. It was conquered by the Dutch East India Company in 1656 after they intervened in the war. With Colombo gaining prominence as the center for Dutch administration in the island, it was expanded to protect against attacks from both the sea and the interior of the island. The Dutch demolished the Portuguese-built fortification and reconstructed it to take advantage of the natural strength of the location between a lake and the sea. The present layout of Fort and the Pettah was the result of the Dutch remodeling of Colombo. The Pettah was known in Dutch times as the 'Oude Stad' (Old Town), and consisted of the residential area of Colombo. The Fort was where they built their fortifications, it was known as 'the Casteel' in Dutch.

Following the British acquiring control of the Dutch-controlled areas on the coast of the island, the fort became the center of its administration. In 1815 with Kandyan Convention, Colombo became the capital of the entire island. The walls of the fort to the north, east and south were demolished between 1869 and 1871 as the fort was obsolete and to make room for new military barracks (the Echelon Barracks). The ramparts or walls of the fort were also considered an obstruction to planned urban development in the area. Dutch buildings were also demolished and were replaced by British-style architecture.

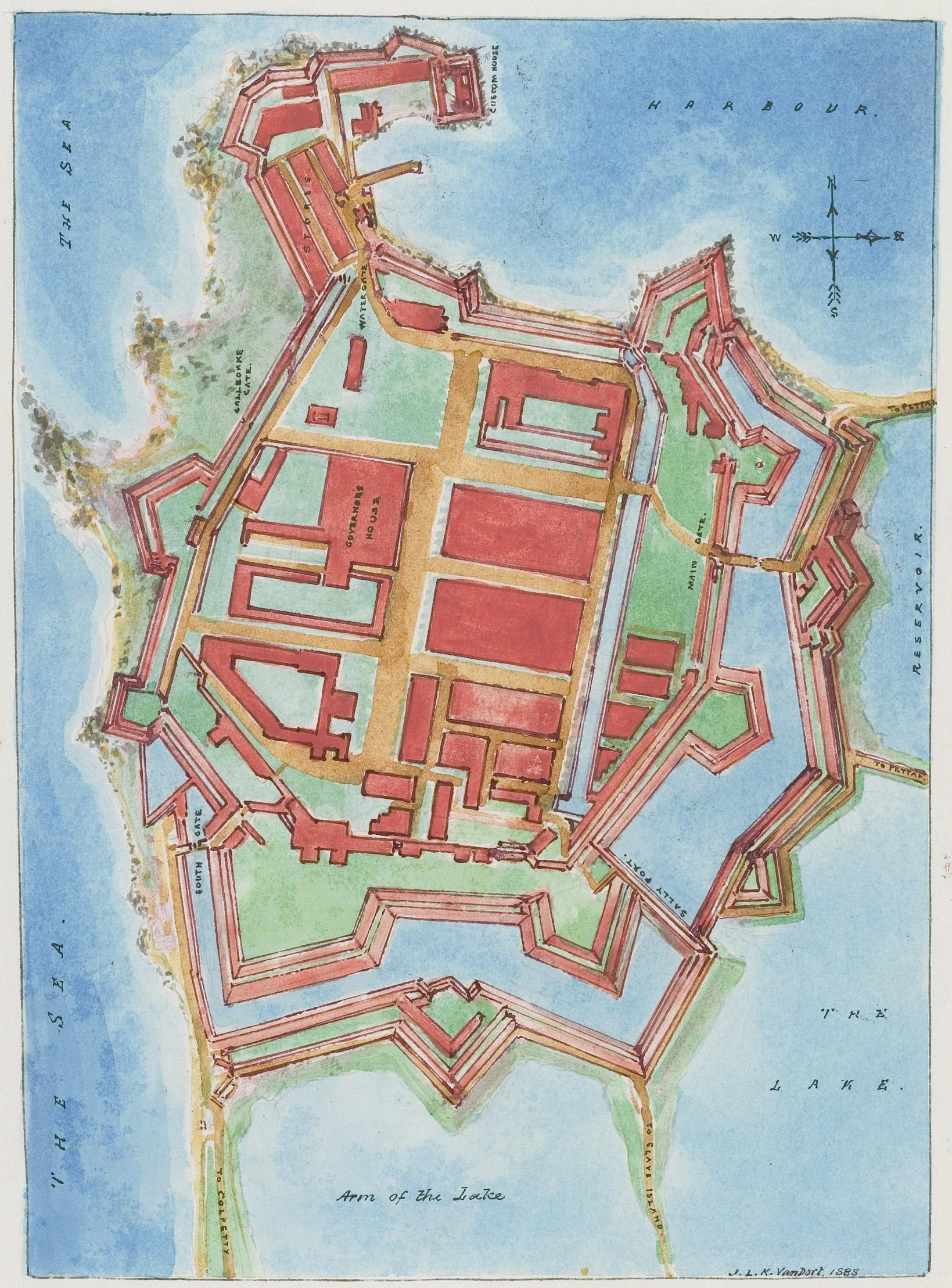
A copy of the oldest known map of Colombo Fort by J. L. K. van Dort

Although the ramparts were taken down, the area remained to be called the Fort. Many buildings in the fort area were home to the British administration on the island and as more legislative responsibilities were transferred to the Ceylonese, it became the site of the Legislative Council and the State Council. As well as the heart of the administrative capital, the fort area became the heart of the commercial capital too due to the expansion of the harbour after the 1870s. Following independence much of the center of government was centered in this area. However, with the expansion of the government administration, in 1980s the government began to move government ministries and departments to Sri Jayawardenapura Kotte. This began with the shifting of Parliament from the old State Council Building to a new complex in Sri Jayawardenapura. The full shift of government was never completed, as many important government institutions still remain there.

== Remains ==
There are a number of locations which contain the remains of the fort and its ramparts. These include the Delft Gate, located within the Commercial House along Bristol Street. The Delft Gate was one of the three main entrances into the fort, the others being the Galle Gate in the south and the Water Gate to the harbour. The Delft Gate was located on the eastern ramparts between the bastions of Delft and Hoorn. The remains of the wall that enclosed the Battenburg Battery can be found inside the harbour area. The Battenburg Battery was one of the two gun batteries built by the Dutch to cover the approach from the sea. A warehouse, known as a Pakhuis, which linked the fort and the outer defenses and was fortified with thick masonry in order to withstand bombardment from the sea also still remains. It currently houses the Colombo Maritime Museum. There is also a section of the wall from Enkhuysen Bastion to Dan Briel Bastion that still exists. A section of the rampart wall, the bastion Dan Briel, a modest bastion located between the Enkhuysen and the Battenburg Batteries, as well as a postern gate, known as the Slave Port, still exist within the grounds of SLNS Parakrama.

== Buildings and landmarks ==
The fort area is a mixture of buildings from many eras of the city's past. The most notable of residences of the fort is the President's House, official residence of the President of Sri Lanka, next to the Gordon Gardens which was once open to the public is now part of the President's House. The residence traces it origins to the Dutch period when it was the residence of the Dutch Governor and later the British Governor. Hence it was known till 1972 as Queen's House. The Presidential Secretariat housed in the Neo-baroque style Old Parliament Building. Several important government ministries are also located here, these include the Ministry of Finance housed in the General Treasury Building and the Ministry of Foreign Affairs housed in the Republic Building. SLNS Parakrama the Naval headquarters of the Sri Lanka Navy is located along Flagstaff Street. Along the Janadhipathi Mawatha (formerly Queens Street) is the location of the Central Bank of Sri Lanka and the old General Post Office. Apart from these the Central Telegraph Office, Police Headquarters, Colombo Metropolitan Police building, Sri Lanka Port Authority building, Times building and the Cargills & Millers building are located in the fort area.

Fort is home to the head offices of many banks and business, hence it is considered the financial district of Colombo. These banks include the Bank of Ceylon, HSBC, State Bank of India, Standard Chartered Bank, Seylan Bank, Sampath Bank, Hatton National Bank, People's Bank and the Commercial Bank. The World Trade Centre of Colombo is one of the tallest buildings in the city and is home to the Colombo Stock Exchange and many leading corporations. The head offices of the Sri Lanka Telecom and Ceylinco Consolidated are located here, at Ceylinco House. There are a number of hotels are also located in the area, including the Grand Oriental Hotel, Hilton Colombo, Colombo Intercontinental, Galadari Hotel and the Colombo City Hotel. Notable landmarks in the fort area are the Old Colombo Lighthouse, Colombo Lighthouse, St. Peter's Church, the Old Colombo Dutch Hospital and the Sambodhi Chaithya.

The northern part of the fort area makes up the southern parameter of the Colombo Harbour. Located in this part is the head office of the Sri Lanka Port Authority, Sri Lanka Customs, Bandaranayaka Quay and the Queen Elizabeth Quay.

== Streets ==
=== North - South streets ===
- Chaithya Road (formerly Marine Drive)
- Galle Buck Road
- Flagstaff Street
- Janadhipathi Mawatha (formerly Queens Street)
- Hospital Lane
- York Street
- York Arcade Road
- Bristol Street
- Duke Street
- Lotus Road

=== East - West streets ===
- Lotus Road
- Regal Terrace
- Bank of Ceylon Mawatha
- Chatham Street
- Canal Row
- Hospital Street
- Mudalige Mawatha (formerly Baille Street)
- Sir Baron Jayathilaka Mawatha (formerly Prince Street)
- Church Street
- Leyden Bastian Road
- Colombo Port Main Road

== Squares ==
- Echelon Square
- Republic Square

== Diplomatic missions ==
- Consulate of Denmark
- Consulate of Spain
- High Commission of Seychelles
- Consulate of Latvia
- Consulate of Lithuania

== See also ==
- Colombo Lighthouse
- Old Colombo Lighthouse
- Echelon Barracks
- St. Peter's Church, Colombo
- Cargills Building
- Old Colombo Dutch Hospital
