= Independence Day (Sri Lanka) =

National holiday in Sri Lanka

- Official name: Independence Day of Sri Lanka ශ්‍රී ලංකා ජාතික දිනය இலங்கையின் தேசிய தினம்
- Observed by: Sri Lanka
- Type: National
- Significance: Commemorates Sri Lanka's independence from Britain in 1948
- Celebrations: Independence Day Parade and an address by the President of Sri Lanka
- Date: 4 February
- Next time: 4 February 2026
- Frequency: Annually

Independence Day, is a Sri Lankan national holiday celebrated annually on 4 February to commemorate the country’s political independence from British rule in 1948. It is celebrated all over the country through a flag-hoisting ceremony, dances, parades, and performances. Usually, the main celebration takes place in Colombo, where the President of Sri Lanka raises the national flag and delivers a nationally televised speech.

Traditionally the Sri Lanka Navy accords a 21 gun salute to the nation from the ceremonial naval gun battery at the Colombo Lighthouse. A Google Doodle reaching only Sri Lanka celebrated the occasion in 2013 and from 2017 continuously onwards.

== Locations of main celebrations ==
- 1991 - Independence Square
- 1992- Independence Square
- 1993 - Independence Square
- 1994 - Independence Square
- 1995 - Independence Square
- 1996 - Independence Square
- 1997 - Independence Square
- 1998 - Parliament Complex - Sri Jayawardana Pura Kotte
- 2008 - Galle Face Green
- 2009 - Galle Face Green
- 2010 - Dalada Maligawa - Kandy
- 2011 - Katharagama
- 2012 - Anuradhapura - Jayanthi St
- 2013 - Trincomalee
- 2014 - Kegalle
- 2015 - Galle Face Green
- 2016 - Galle Face Green
- 2017 - Galle Face Green
- 2018 - Galle Face Green
- 2019 - Galle Face Green
- 2020 - Independence Square
- 2021 - Independence Square
- 2022 - Independence Square
- 2023 - Galle Face Green
- 2024 - Galle Face Green
- 2025 - Independence Square

== See also ==
- Sri Lankan independence movement
