= HMCyS Vijaya =

Algerine-class minesweeper

History

United Kingdom
- Name: Flying Fish
- Ordered: as Tillsonburg
- Builder: Redfern Construction Co., Toronto
- Yard number: 55
- Laid down: 30 October 1943
- Launched: 16 February 1944
- Completed: 14 October 1944

Ceylon
- Name: Vijaya
- Namesake: King Vijaya
- Acquired: 1951
- Commissioned: 1951
- Out of service: 1963
- Home port: Trincomalee
- Fate: broken up, 1975

General characteristics
- Class & type: Algerine-class minesweeper
- Displacement: 1,030 long tons (1,047 t) (standard); 1,325 long tons (1,346 t) (deep)
- Length: 225 ft (69 m) o/a
- Beam: 35 ft 6 in (10.82 m)
- Draught: 12.25 ft 6 in (3.89 m)
- Installed power: 2 × Admiralty 3-drum boilers; 2,400 ihp (1,800 kW)
- Propulsion: 2 shafts; 2 vertical triple-expansion steam engines
- Speed: 16.5 knots (30.6 km/h; 19.0 mph)
- Range: 5,000 nmi (9,300 km; 5,800 mi) at 10 knots (19 km/h; 12 mph)
- Complement: 85
- Armament: 1 × QF 4 in (102 mm) Mk V anti-aircraft gun; 4 × twin Oerlikon 20 mm cannon

HMCyS Vijaya, named in honor of Vijaya, the first king of Sri Lanka, was an Algerine-class minesweeper of the Royal Ceylon Navy, the first warship of that navy. Vijaya had been built as HMS Flying Fish (J370) for the Royal Navy during World War II, but was given to Ceylon by the United Kingdom upon the 1951 formation of Ceylon's navy.

== Design and description ==
The reciprocating group displaced 1,010–1,030 long tons (1,030–1,050 t) at standard load and 1,305–1,325 long tons (1,326–1,346 t) at deep load The ships measured 225 feet (68.6 m) long overall with a beam of 35 feet 6 inches (10.8 m). They had a draught of 12 feet 3 inches (3.7 m). The ships' complement consisted of 85 officers and ratings.

The reciprocating ships had two vertical triple-expansion steam engines, each driving one shaft, using steam provided by two Admiralty three-drum boilers. The engines produced a total of 2,400 indicated horsepower (1,800 kW) and gave a maximum speed of 16.5 knots (30.6 km/h; 19.0 mph). They carried a maximum of 660 long tons (671 t) of fuel oil that gave them a range of 5,000 nautical miles (9,300 km; 5,800 mi) at 10 knots (19 km/h; 12 mph).

The Algerine class was armed with a QF 4 in (102 mm) Mk V anti-aircraft gun and four twin-gun mounts for Oerlikon 20 mm cannon. The latter guns were in short supply when the first ships were being completed and they often got a proportion of single mounts. By 1944, single-barrel Bofors 40 mm mounts began replacing the twin 20 mm mounts on a one for one basis. All of the ships were fitted for four throwers and two rails for depth charges.

== Construction ==
The vessel was put on order from the Redfern Construction Company's shipyard in Toronto in November 1942. She was laid down on 30 October 1943, launched 16 February 1944 and completed 14 October the same year. Originally built for the Royal Canadian Navy as HMCS Tillsonburg, she was transferred on completion to the Royal Navy as HMS Flying Fish. This was part of an exchange programme, whereby the RCN received British-built Castle-class corvettes, as they needed escort vessels rather than minesweepers at that stage of the conflict. The name Tillsonburg was given to one of the new corvettes.

== Career ==
=== As HMS Flying Fish ===
HMS Flying Fish was commissioned into the Royal Navy in October 1944. She had an uneventful career as a minesweeper until the end of hostilities. After the war she was given to Ceylon on indefinite loan by Britain in 1949 at Singapore with a formal transfer in Colombo.

=== As HMCyS Vijaya ===
When the Royal Ceylon Navy was formed in 1951 it became the first warship of the navy and was named after the first King of the Island. The First Sri Lankan Captain on the vessel was Lieutenant Commander (later Rear Admiral) Rajan Kadiragamar MVO, ADC, RCyN.

From 1949 Vijaya became the training platform for the new navy and began undertaking anti-smuggling and anti-illicit immigration patrols in coastal waters. In May 1951 she sailed to Maldives with Sir John Kotelawala, Minister for Transport and Works and his party for a short visit. Next year she paid another call to participate in the Proclamation of the Maldivian Republic. In 1952 she sailed to Britain to represent the Royal Ceylon Navy at the fleet review on the coronation of Queen Elizabeth II. Although she did not take part in the fleet review due to repairs, the Royal Navy lent a ship of the same class for the RCyN for the review with the name Vijaya II. “Vijaya” undertook her second visit to Burma in 1955, carrying a group of persons to participate in the “Chatta Sangayana”.

“Vijaya” undertook several training and operational tasks, including, a visit to Port Blair in the Andaman Islands with VNF officers and sailors (1954), a visit to Male with VNF officers and sailors (1954), a training cruise to Bombay and Karachchi (1954), a visit to Madras with VNF officers and sailors (1955), a visit to Cochin on a Minesweeping exercise (1955).

Vijaya ran aground during a cyclone in the Gulf of Mannar in December 1964.

She was scrapped in 1975.

== Bibliography ==
- Chesneau, Roger, ed. (2003). Conway's All the World's Fighting Ships 1922–1946. London, UK: Conway Maritime Press. ISBN 0-85177-146-7.
- Colledge, J. J.; Warlow, Ben (2006) [1969]. Ships of the Royal Navy: The Complete Record of All Fighting Ships of the Royal Navy from the 15th Century to the Present (3rd Rev ed.). London: Chatham Publishing. ISBN 978-1-86176-281-8. OCLC 67375475.
- Lenton, H. T. (1998). British & Empire Warships of the Second World War. Annapolis, Maryland: Naval Institute Press. ISBN 1-55750-048-7.
- "Flying Fish (6117869)". Miramar Ship Index.
