= Coastal line (Sri Lanka) =

Railway line in Sri Lanka

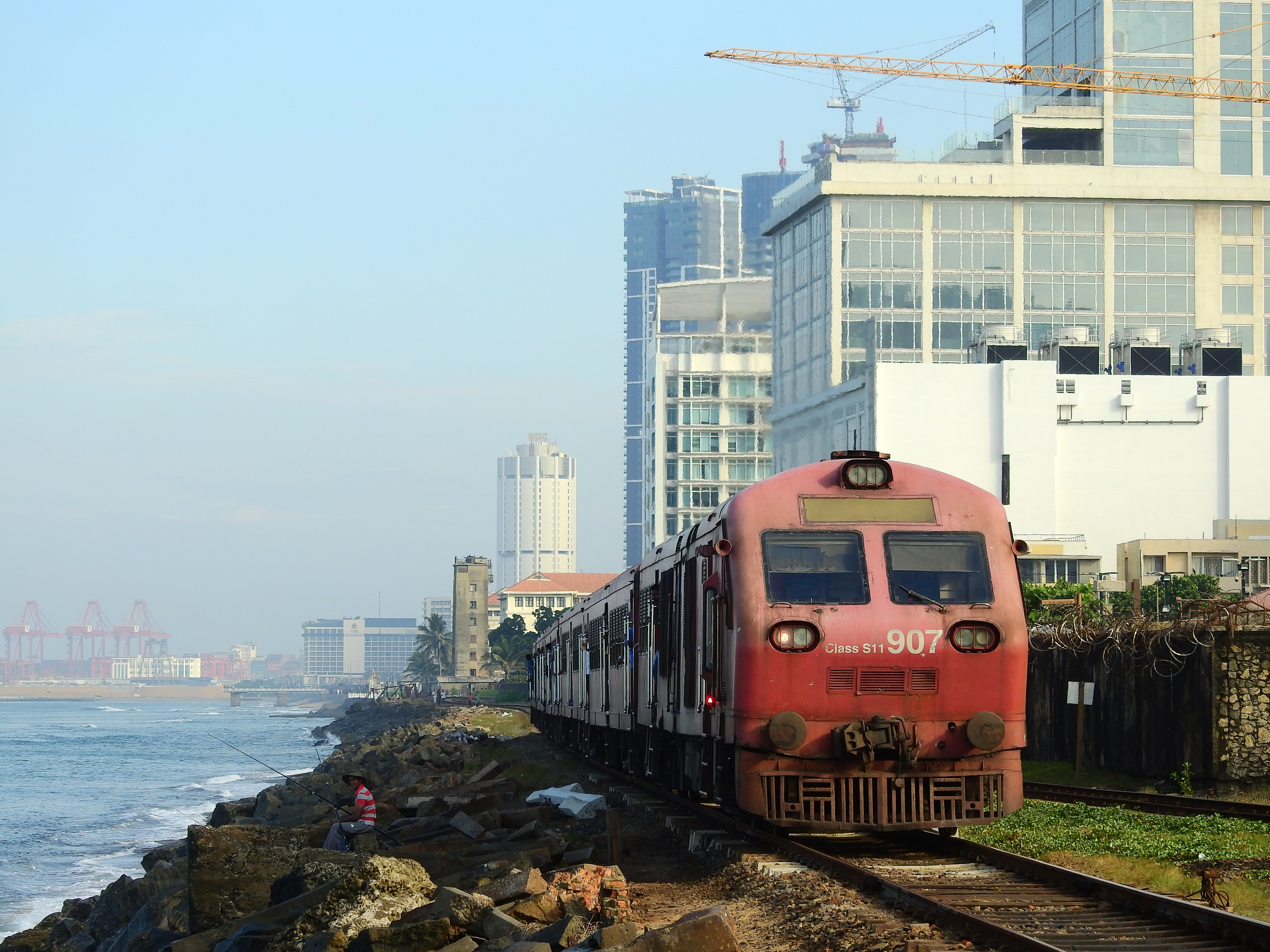
- A train running on the coastal line

Overview
- Status: Functioning
- Owner: Sri Lanka Railways
- Locale: Sri Lanka
- Termini: Colombo Fort; Beliatta
- Website: www.railway.gov.lk

Service
- Type: Intercity rail
- System: Sri Lanka Railways
- Services: Ruhunu Kumari Express Train; Galu Kumari Express Train; Samudra Devi; Sagarika; Rajarata Rejini Express Train
- Operator(s): Sri Lanka Railways

History
- Opened: 17 December 1895; 129 years ago

Technical
- Line length: 157.88 km (98.10 mi)
- Number of tracks: Double track: Colombo Fort to Paiyagala South; Single track: Paiyagala South to Beliatta
- Track gauge: 1,676 mm (5 ft 6 in)
- Electrification: No
- Operating speed: 100 km/h (62 mph)

The coastal line (sometimes referred to as the coast line or the southern line) is a major railway line in Sri Lanka, running between Colombo Fort and Beliatta, via Galle and Matara. Operated by Sri Lanka Railways, the line includes some of the busiest rail services in the country. The line has been extended to Beliatta on 8 April 2019 and is proposed to be extended to Kataragama, via Hambantota. With a designed maximum speed of 100 km/h (62 mph) between Kalutara and Matara, and a maximum speed of 120 km/h (75 mph) between Matara and Beliatta, the line is one of the fastest in Sri Lanka.

== Route definition ==
The Coastal line begins at Maradana Station and runs west towards Colombo Fort. It then turns south and runs through much of Colombo parallel to the beaches on the city's west coast, passing many commuter rail stations, such as Slave Island. It passes Panadura before reaching Kalutara. The commuter rail services end as the line continues south along the coast towards Galle.

Galle station is designed as a terminus station. Thus trains have to back out of the station to continue towards Matara and Beliatta. Beliatta is the current terminus of the Coast line, though extension is under construction to Hambantota and Kataragama.

== History ==
=== Construction and launch ===
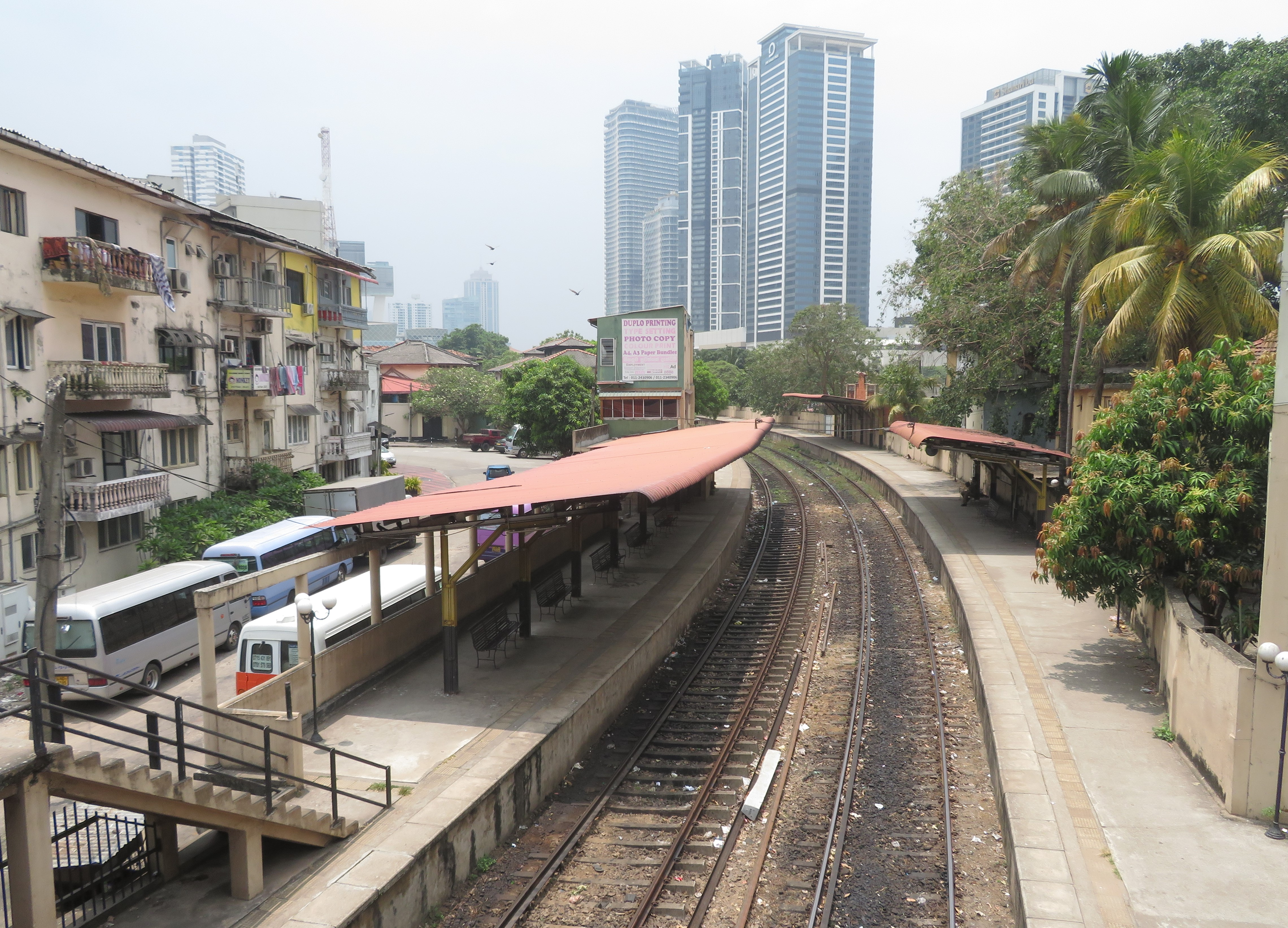
Halting place Secretariat Halt in Colombo

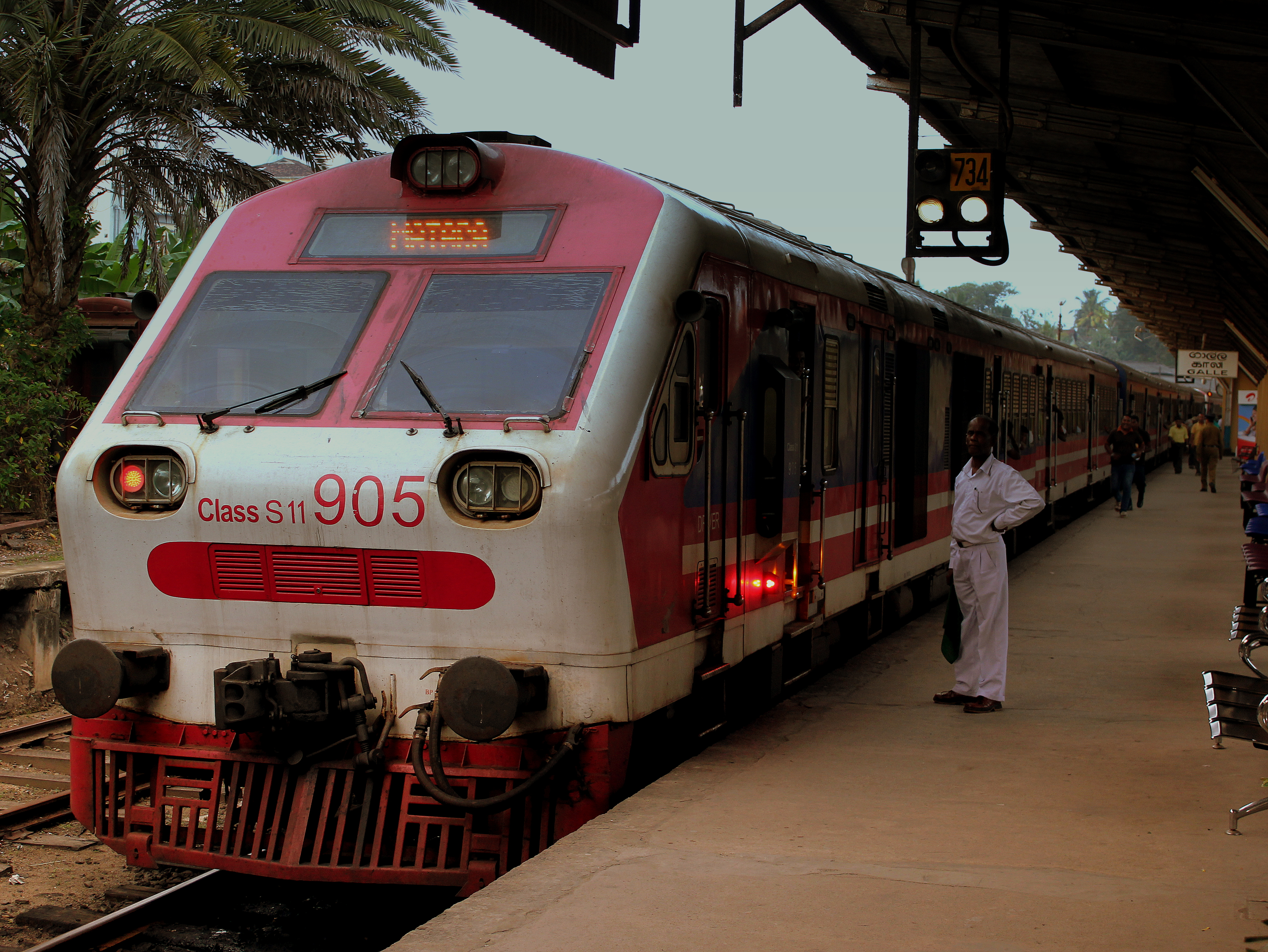
Intercity train at Galle Station

This line was the second railway line in Sri Lanka. Construction works started after Colombo–Kandy–Badulla Main Line. On 1 March 1877 first train up to Panadura was commenced. On 1 February 1878, trains ran up to Kalutara and one year after that on 1 February 1879 Wadduwa Station was declared open. On 22 September 1879 inaugural opening of Kalutara North and Kalutara South Stations and ran first train to Kalutara South. On 31 March 1890 line extended to Kalutara South to Aluthgama. Then up to Kosgoda on 8 September 1892 and Kosgoda to Ambalangoda on 15 November 1893. On 7 May 1894 British government completed the construction works to Galle. After nearly a year and half later on 17 December 1895 train services to Matara commenced.

=== Twentieth-century growth ===
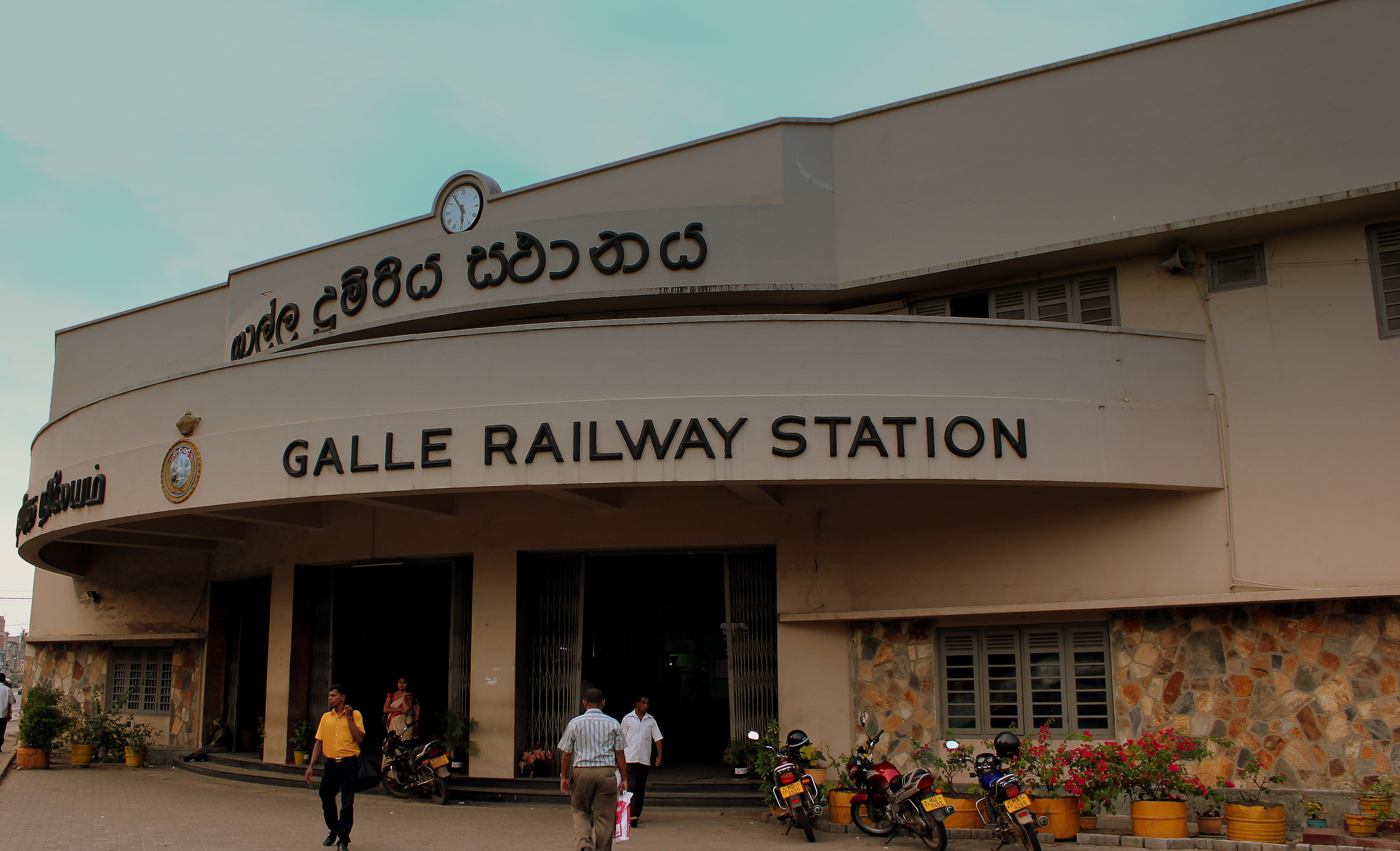
Architecture at Galle station

In the mid-twentieth century, the coastal line experienced many changes to accommodate growing traffic. Galle Station was upgraded with better facilities and modern architecture. Express trains began serving the line, including the now celebrated Ruhunu Kumari. Along with the rest of the railway network, diesel traction replaced steam locomotives on all services.

=== Tsunami disaster and aftermath ===
The railway line was severely affected by the 2004 Indian Ocean tsunami. A train was swept off the track, killing more than 1500, in the worst rail disaster in history.

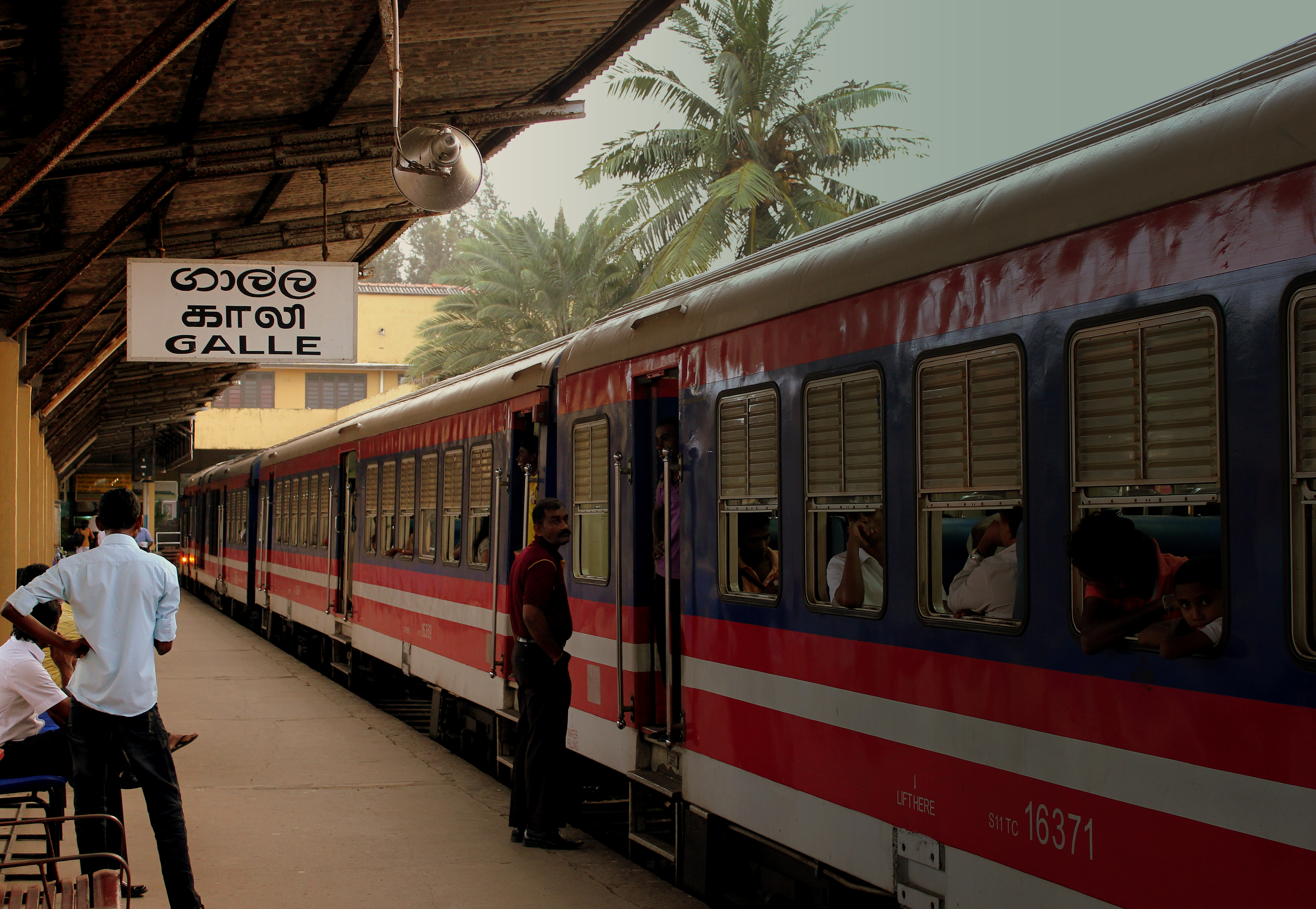
A train at Galle station

=== Track upgrade ===
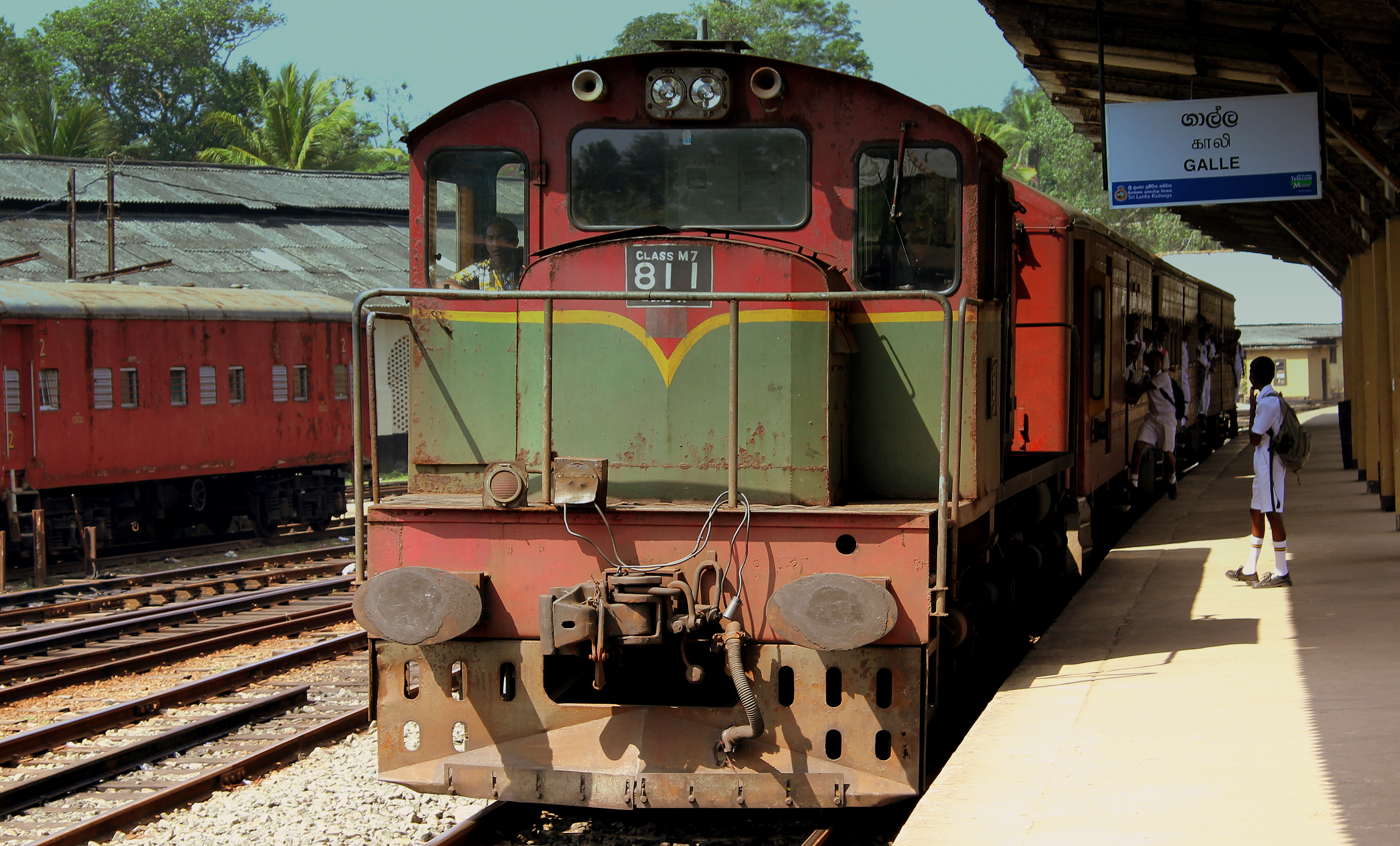
A train arriving Galle station

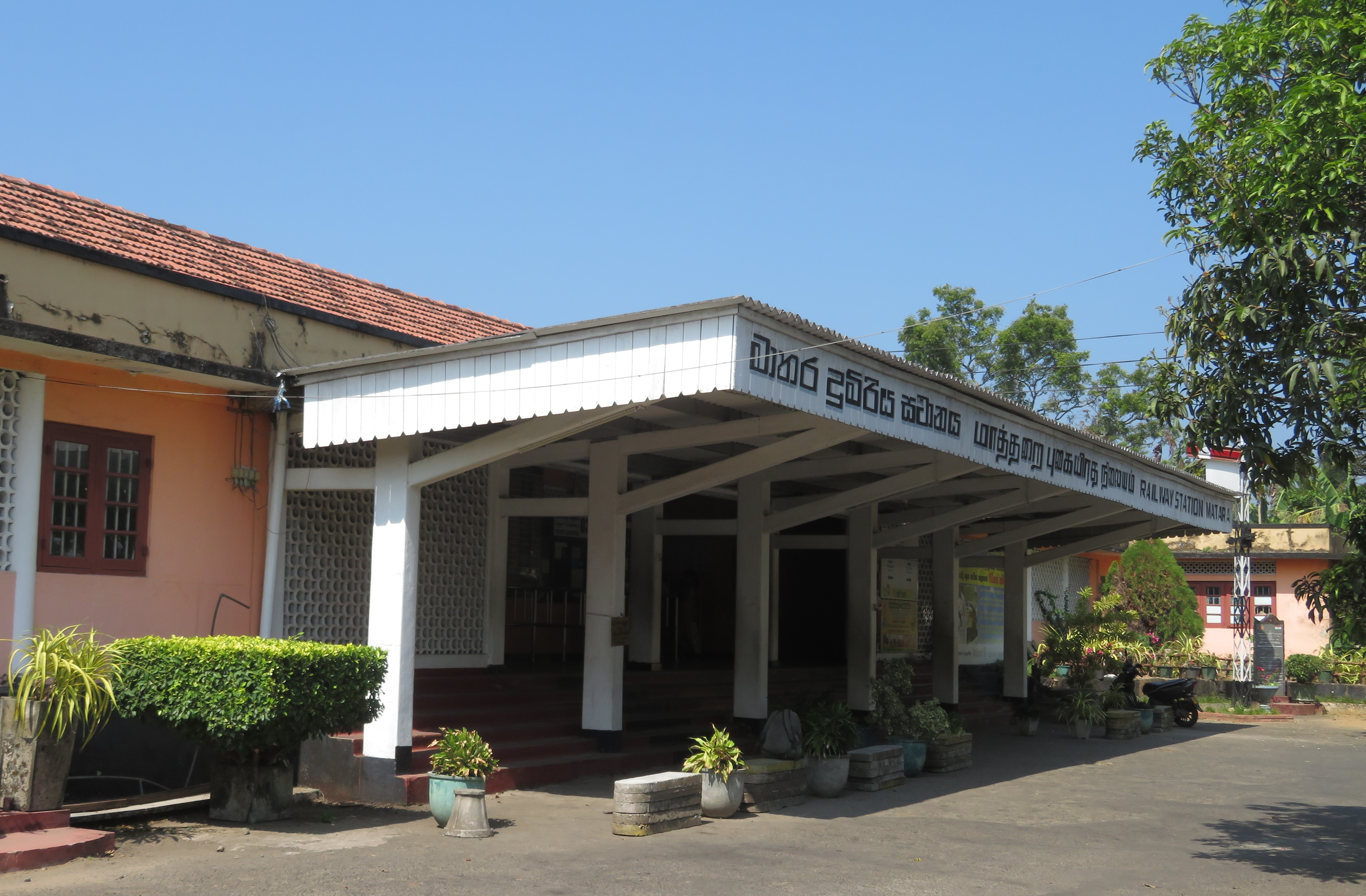
Matara Railway Station

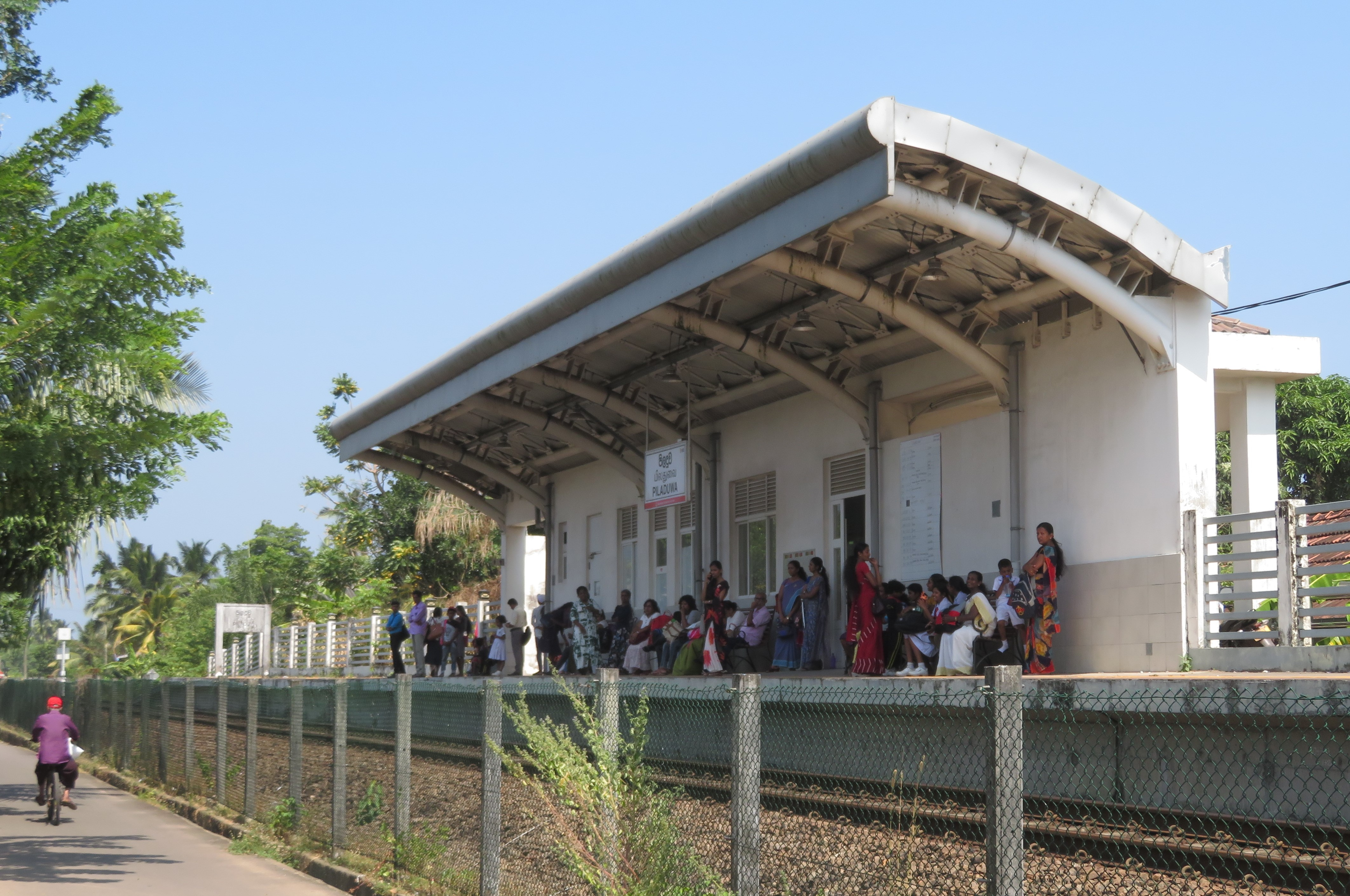
Piladuwa, a new halting place in the east of Matara

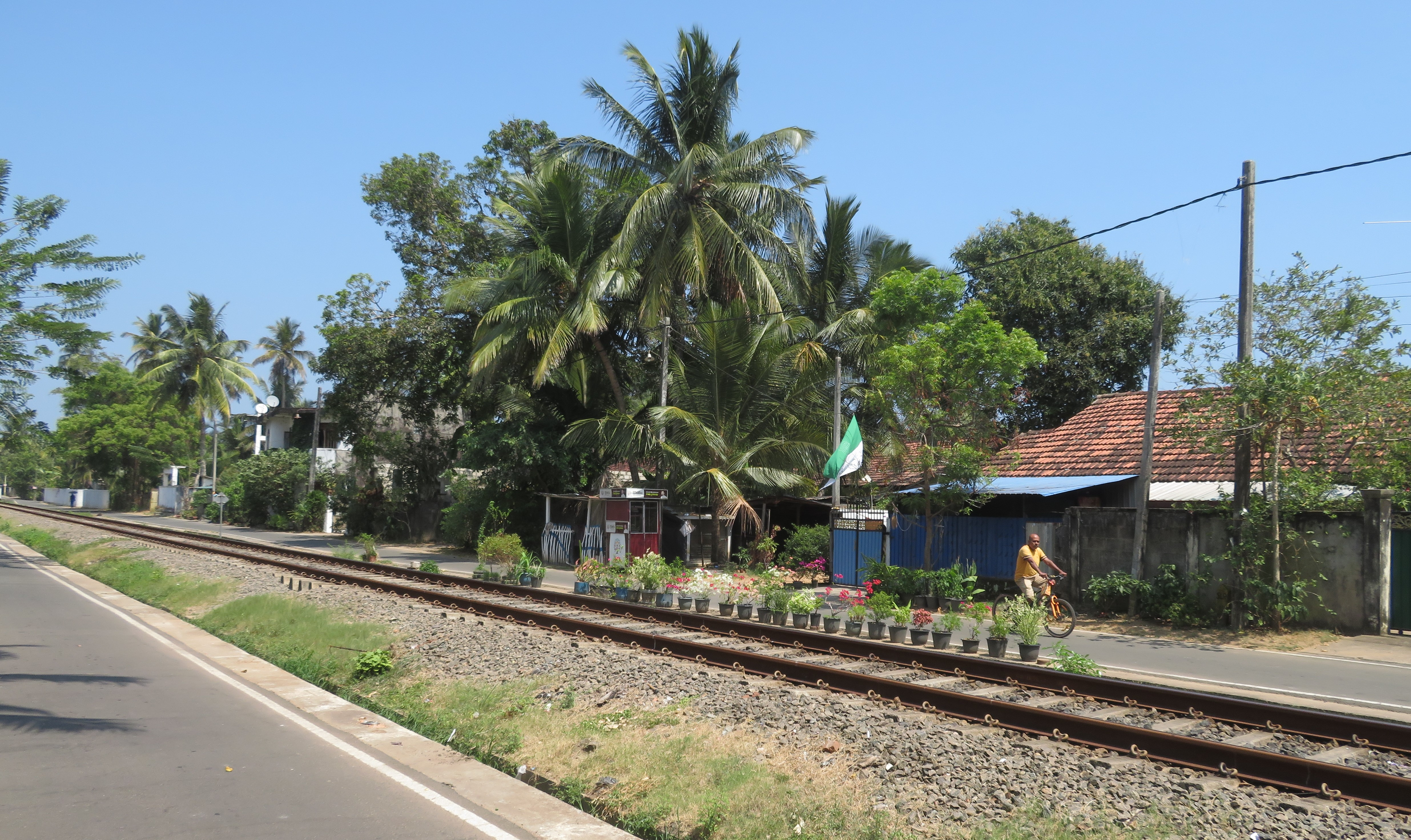
New railway track in the east of Matara, opened in 2019

In 2011–2012, the Coastal Line underwent complete reconstruction between Kalutara and Matara, to upgrade the track. The line was upgraded to be able to handle trains at 100 km/h (62 mph), allowing for shorter journey times and smoother service. The upgrade included replacing the rails and sleepers to ensure smoother and safer operation. The previously 3-hours-and-forty-minute travel time between Colombo and Matara has been reduced to just two hours.

=== Matara–Kataragama extension ===
The railway is being extended from Matara to Kataragama in the Southern Railway project.

Phase 1 extended the railway 26.8 km from Matara to Beliatta at a cost of US$278 million. The China National Machinery Import and Export Corporation broke ground on Phase 1 in 2013. The line includes two bridges of 1.5 km and 1.04 km in length, the longest on Sri Lanka's railway network. There is also a 615 meter long tunnel at Kekanadura. The maximum track speed is 120 km/h (75 mph). The Matara–Beliatta extension with four new railway stations and four halting places opened to traffic on 8 April 2019, the first new railway built in Sri Lanka since independence from Great Britain in 1948.

Phase 2 will serve the Magampura Mahinda Rajapaksa Port in Hambantota at a cost of US$600 million, and Phase 3 will reach Kataragama. The alignment shifts inland after Beliatta to protect sensitive natural habitats along the coast and minimise damage to property. A feasibility study and an environment impact assessment for the Beliatta to Hambantota and Kataragama phases of construction has been approved by the Cabinet. Construction has not yet begun as of April 2019.

== Operators and service providers ==
Sri Lanka Railways operates passenger services on the coastal line.

Rajadhani Express operates a premium service on certain Sri Lanka Railways trains on the coastal line, in partnership with Sri Lanka Railways.

== Infrastructure ==
The coastal line has a gauge of 5 ft 6 in (1,676 mm) broad gauge.

The coastal line is not electrified. Regular services run on diesel power. However, there are plans to electrify the commuter-rail network, within the Colombo metropolitan area. This includes the coastal-line segment between Colombo Fort and Panadura.

In February 2017 a project to expand the single-track railway to a double-track railway from Kalutara to Paiyagala was launched.

== Timetable ==
=== Downwards ===
Train No.	Starting station	Departure time	Destination station	Arrival time	Name	Frequency
8708	Aluthgama	04.05	Galle	06.40		Mon. to Fri.
	Maradana	04.30	Panadura	05.25		Daily
	Maradana	05.05	Panadura	05.53		Daily
	Maradana	05.38	Kalutara South	07.15		Daily
	Maradana	05.52	Panadura	06.47		Mon. to Sat.
8060	Maradana	06.05	Beliatta	09.16		Sat. and Sun.
	Maradana	06.24	Panadura	07.19		Mon. to Fri.
8050	Maradana	06.30	Beliatta	11.21		Daily
8719	Aluthgama	06.30	Galle	08.17		Mon. to Fri.
	Galle	06.50	Matara	07.59		Saturday only
	Maradana	06.53	Moratuwa	07.28		Mon. to Fri.
	Maradana	07.00	Panadura	07.51		Mon. to Fri.
	Maradana	07.00	Panadura	08.40		Sat. and Sun.
	Galle	07.00	Matara	08.16		Mon. to Fri. and Sunday
	Maradana	07.17	Moratuwa	08.01		Mon. to Fri.
	Maradana	07.27	Panadura	08.25		Sat. and Sun.
	Maradana	07.31	Panadura	08.40		Mon. to Fri.
	Maradana	07.35	Mount Lavinia	08.15		Mon. to Fri.
	Maradana	07.54	Panadura	08.51		Mon. to Fri.
	Maradana	08.06	Moratuwa	08.50		Mon. to Fri.
	Maradana	08.11	Mount Lavinia	08.46		Mon. to Sat.
	Maradana	08.28	Mount Lavinia	09.06		Sundays and Holidays
	Colombo Fort	08.35	Matara	11.50		Daily
	Maradana	08.35	Kalutara South	10.01		Daily
	Maradana	09.05	Kalutara South	11.17		Daily
	Mount Lavinia	09.35	Aluthgama	10.53		Sat. and Sun.
	Kalutara South	10.10	Aluthgama	10.42		Daily
8086	Colombo Fort	10.30	Beliatta	14.42	Rajarata Rejini	Daily
	Maradana	11.10	Aluthgama	13.07		Daily
	Maradana	12.05	Kalutara South	13.29		Mon. to Fri.
	Maradana	12.30	Kalutara South	13.54		Sat. and Sun.
8788	Aluthgama	13.15	Galle	15.10		Daily
	Maradana	13.30	Panadura	14.25		Mon. to Fri.
	Ginthota	13.40	Galle	13.50		Mon. to Fri.
	Maradana	14.05	Aluthgama	16.11		Daily
8056	Maradana	14.15	Beliatta	18.25		Daily
	Galle	14.15	Matara	15.31		Mon. to Fri.
	Maradana	14.30	Panadura	15.35		Daily
8054	Maradana	15.00	Beliatta	18.25	Dhakshina Express (Intercity)	Daily
	Maradana	15.20	Panadura	16.27		Daily
8058	Maradana	15.40	Matara	18.20	Ruhunu Kumari	Daily
	Maradana	15.50	Mount Lavinia	16.32		Mon. to Fri.
	Maradana	16.00	Moratuwa	16.39		Mon. to Fri.
	Maradana	16.10	Kalutara South	17.15		Mon. to Fri.
	Maradana	16.15	Kalutara South	17.39		Mon. to Fri.
	Maradana	16.25	Panadura	17.15		Mon. to Fri.
8096	Maradana	16.40	Beliatta	20.04	Sagarika	Mon. to Fri.
	Maradana	16.40	Hikkaduwa	18.56		Sunday only
	Maradana	16.45	Induruwa	18.34		Mon. to Fri.
	Maradana	16.45	Aluthgama	18.51		Sat. and Sun.
	Maradana	16.55	Hikkaduwa	18.51		Mon. to Fri.
	Maradana	17.10	Wadduwa	18.23		Mon. to Fri.
8096	Maradana	17.20	Galle	19.33	Sagarika	Sat. and Sun.
8760	Maradana	17.25	Galle	20.10	Samudra Devi	Mon. to Fri.
8764	Maradana	17.30	Galle	21.07		Mon. to Fri.
	Maradana	17.40	Aluthgama	19.51		Mon. to Fri.
8766	Maradana	17.50	Beliatta	22.15		Mon. to Fri.
8764	Maradana	17.50	Galle	21.22		Sat. and Sun.
	Colombo Fort	17.52	Matara	20.42		Sunday only
	Maradana	17.55	Matara	21.38		Mon. to Fri.
	Maradana	18.10	Aluthgama	20.07		Daily
	Maradana	18.25	Aluthgama	20.45		Daily
8775	Maradana	18.45	Galle	22.55	Night Mail	Daily
	Maradana	19.45	Aluthgama	21.40		Monday to Friday and Sunday
	Maradana	19.45	Panadura	20.40		Saturday only
	Colombo Fort	20.00	Mount Lavinia	20.31		Daily
	Colombo Fort	20.19	Moratuwa	21.00	Special Trains	8/3
	Maradana	20.35	Panadura	22.10		Mon. to Fri.
	Maradana	20.35	Kalutara South	21.57		Sunday only
	Maradana	21.30	Aluthgama	23.25		Daily

=== Upwards ===
Starting station	Departure time	Destination station	Time	Name	Frequency
Aluthgama	03.20	Colombo Fort	05.10		Daily
Galle	03.40	Maradana	07.01	Night Mail	Mon. to Fri.
Aluthgama	03.50	Colombo Fort	05.40		Daily
Galle	04.15	Maradana	07.45		Mon. to Fri.
Aluthgama	04.30	Colombo Fort	06.22		Mon. to Sat.
Matara	04.55	Maradana	08.16	Sagarika	Mon. to Fri.
Galle	05.00	Maradana	07.54	Samudra Devi	Mon. to Sat.
Matara	05.05	Galle	06.50		Mon. to Fri.
Mount Lavinia	05.10	Colombo Fort	05.35	Intercity	Daily
Aluthgama	05.20	Maradana	07.28		Mon. to Fri.
Galle	05.25	Kalutara South	07.45		Mon. to Fri.
Hikkaduwa	05.25	Maradana	07.50		Mon. to Fri.
Aluthgama	05.25	Maradana	07.40		Sat. and Sun.
Mount Lavinia	05.50	Colombo Fort	06.17	Yaldevi	Daily
Matara	06.05	Maradana	08.49	Ruhunu Kumari	Daily
Aluthgama	06.05	Maradana	08.08		Mon. to Fri.
Matara	06.10	Maradana	09.38	Galu Kumari	Mon. to Fri. and Sun.
Panadura	06.10	Maradana	07.07		Daily
Panadura	06.30	Maradana	07.41		Mon. to Fri.
Panadura	06.55	Colombo Fort	07.42		Mon. to Sat.
Aluthgama	07.00	Maradana	09.30		Mon. to Fri.
Matara	07.10	Galle	08.13		Mon. to Fri.
Kalutara South	07.20	Colombo Fort	08.33		Mon. to Fri.
Panadura	07.30	Maradana	08.28		Not on Sundays (Mon. to Sat.)
Moratuwa	07.50	Maradana	08.34		Not on Saturdays and Sundays (Mon. to Fri.)
Panadura	08.05	Maradana	09.07		Daily
Moratuwa	08.05	Maradana	08.46		Mon. to Fri.
Galle	09.00	Colombo Fort	13.03		Mon. to Sat.
Moratuwa	09.00	Maradana	09.42		Mon. to Fri.
Panadura	09.15	Maradana	10.13		Working days only
Mount Lavinia	09.15	Maradana	09.50		Mon. to Sat.
Panadura	09.35	Maradana	10.41		Daily
Matara	09.40	Colombo Fort	13.15	Rajarata Rejini	Daily
Matara	10.25	Galle	11.33		Mon. to Fri.
Kalutara South	10.45	Maradana	12.10		Daily
Kalutara South	12.20	Maradana	14.15		Daily
Galle	13.05	Aluthgama	14.43		Daily
Galle	13.15	Ginthota	13.25		Mon. to Fri.
Matara	13.35	Colombo Fort	17.14		Daily
Aluthgama	13.40	Maradana	15.31		Mon. to Fri.
Kalutara South	13.40	Maradana	15.01		Mon. to Fri.
Aluthgama	13.40	Maradana	15.35		Sat. and Sun.
Galle	13.55	Aluthgama	15.59		Mon. to Fri.
Matara	14.10	Maradana	18.12		Daily
Panadura	15.00	Maradana	15.55		Mon. to Fri.
Matara	15.15	Galle	16.18		Daily
Panadura	16.10	Colombo Fort	17.11		Daily
Mount Lavinia	16.10	Colombo Fort	16.42		Mon. to Fri.
Aluthgama	16.15	Colombo Fort	18.33		Mon. to Fri.
Aluthgama	16.15	Colombo Fort	18.45		Sat. and Sun.
Moratuwa	16.45	Colombo Fort	17.18		Mon. to Fri.
Matara	17.00	Galle	18.16		Mon. to Fri.
Galle	17.05	Aluthgama	18.57		Daily
Panadura	17.05	Colombo Fort	18.04		Daily
Moratuwa	17.10	Colombo Fort	17.49		Mon. to Fri.
Kalutara South	17.30	Colombo Fort	18.36		Mon. to Fri.
Panadura	17.40	Colombo Fort	18.29		Mon. to Fri.
Kalutara South	17.45	Colombo Fort	18.52		Mon. to Fri.
Wadduwa	18.30	Maradana	19.35		Mon. to Fri.
