= List of named passenger trains of Sri Lanka =

This article contains a list of named passenger trains in Sri Lanka, by operator.

== Sri Lanka Railways ==
=== Regular services ===
In the mid-1950s, Sri Lanka Railways, under the leadership of B. D. Rampala, started to name major passenger services.

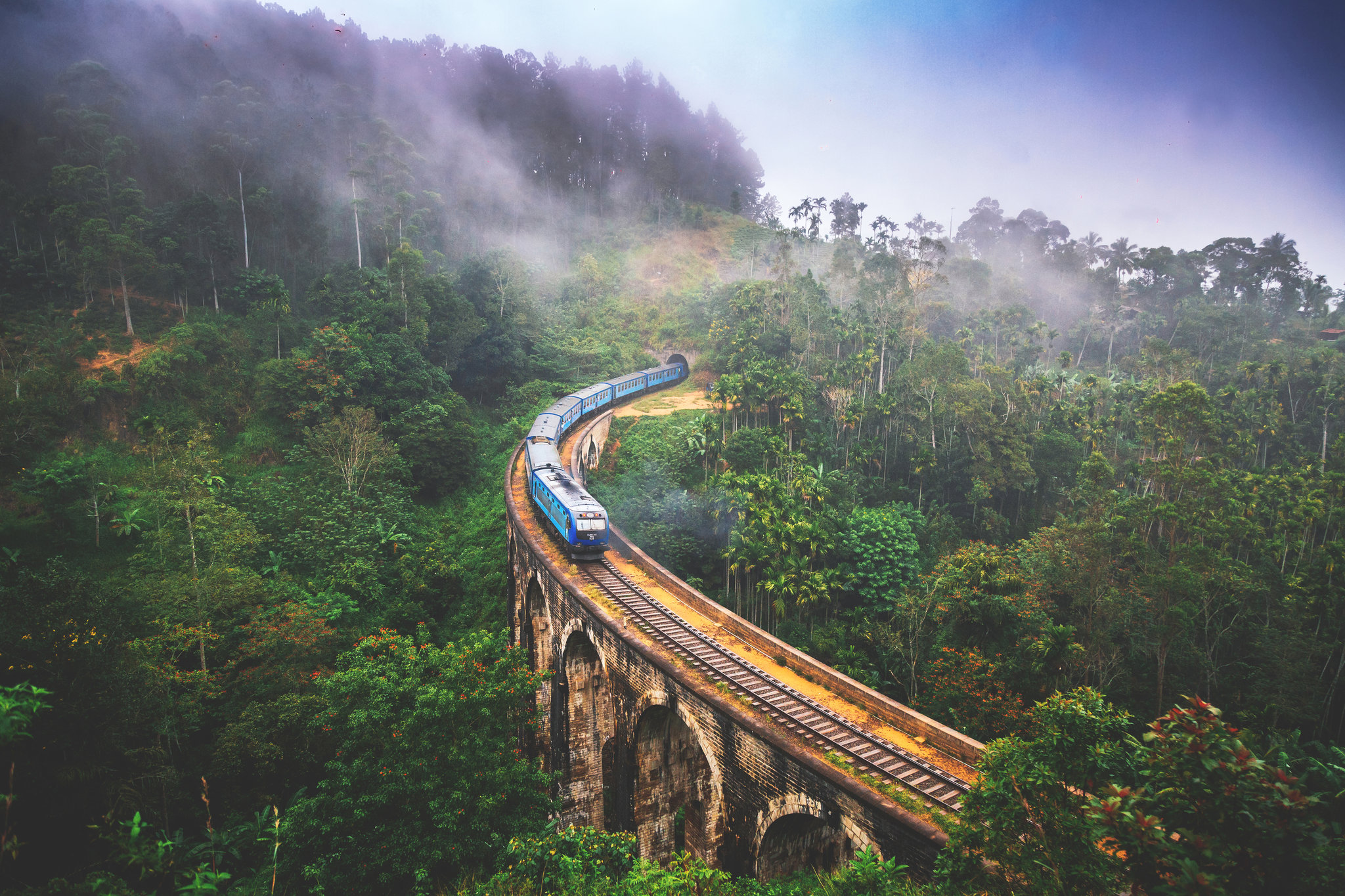
Old Udarata Menike express train

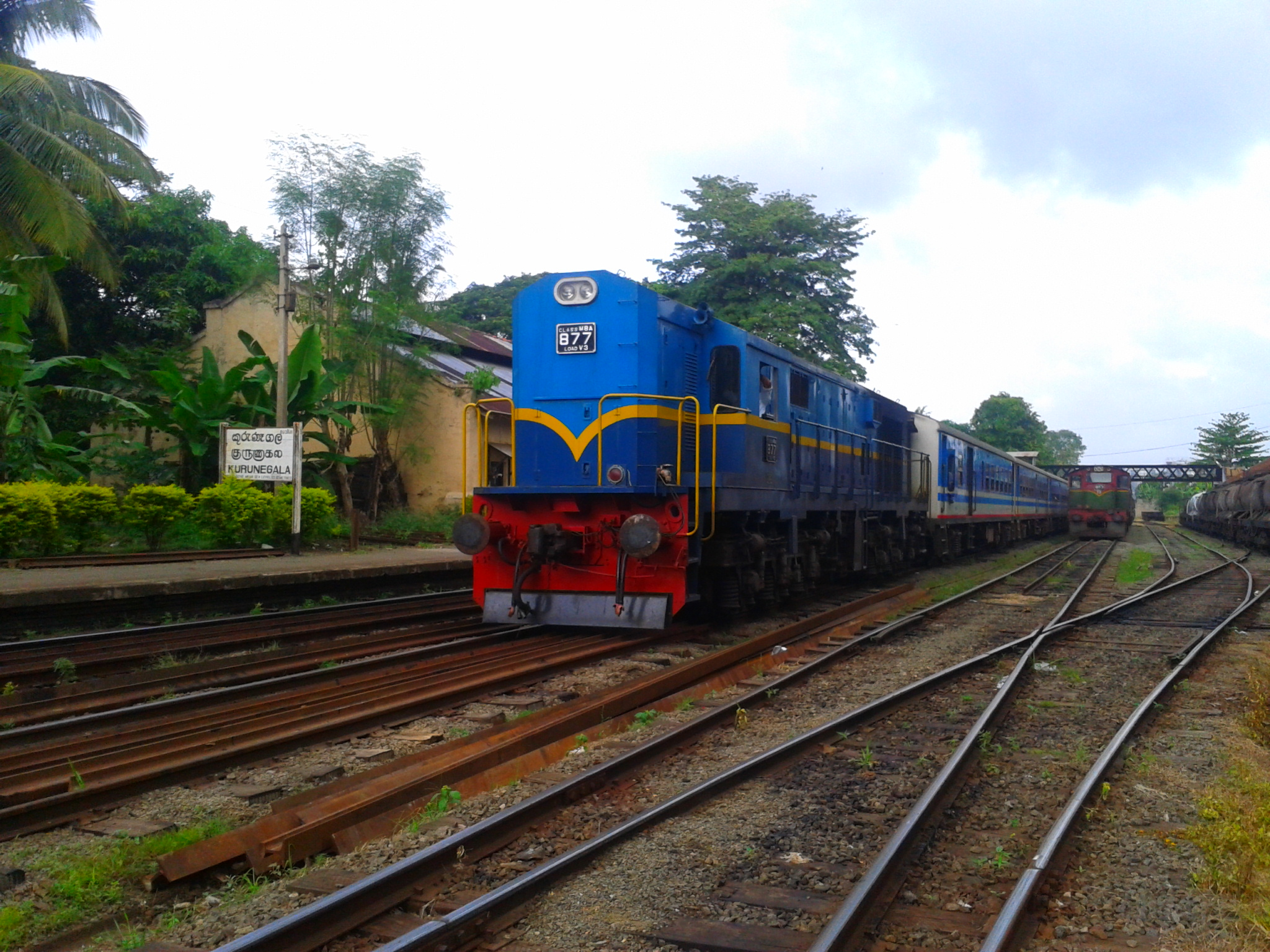
The Old Yal Devi train at Kurunegala, travelling between Omanthai and Colombo Fort

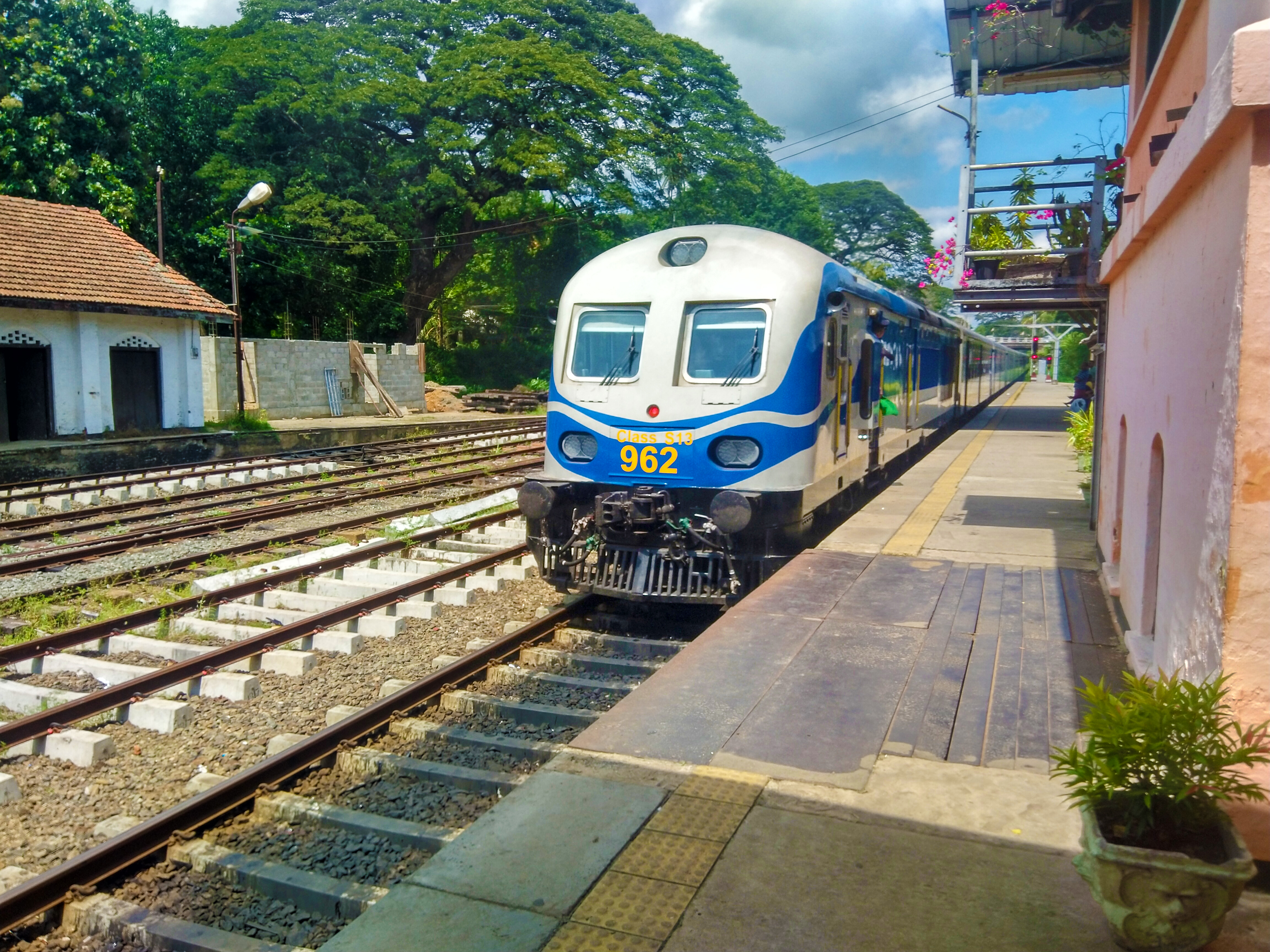
The Deyata Kirula ( Uttara Devi) intercity express train at Kurunegala, travelling between Kankasanthurai and Colombo Fortit will run only up to Anuradhapura railway station for a period of 5 months from 01/05/2023.

- Udarata Menike (Upcountry Maiden/Hill country Maiden) - No. 1015 & 1016
  - Colombo to Badulla (Runs via Kandy)
- Podi Menike (Little Maiden) - No. 1005 & 1006
  - Colombo to Badulla (Runs via Kandy)
- Tikiri Menike (Little Maiden) - No. 1023 & 1024
  - Colombo to Nanu Oya
- Senkadagala Menike (Maiden of “Senkadagala” – area name) - No. 1035 & 1036
  - Colombo to Kandy
- Yal Devi (Princess/Queen of Jaffna) - No. 4077& 4078
  - Colombo Fort to Kankasanthurai (Runs via Jaffna)
- Uttara Devi (Princess/Queen of the North) - No. 4017 & 4018
  - Colombo Fort to Kankasanthurai (Intercity).
- Udaya Devi or (Princess/Queen of the Rise -East) - No. 6011 & 6012
  - Colombo to Batticaloa
- Rajarata Rejini (Regant of the land of kings) - No. 8085, 8086, 4085, & 4086
  - Anuradhapura to Beliatta (Runs via Colombo)
- Ruhunu Kumari (Princess of “Ruhuna” – southern province) - No. 8058 & 8059
  - Maradana to Matara (Runs via Colombo-fort)
- Muthu Kumari (Pearl Princess) - No. 3427
  - Panadura to Chilaw (Runs via Colombo-fort)
- Samudra Devi (Queen of the Oceans) - No. 8760 & 8327
  - Maradana to Galle
- Galu Kumari (Princess of Galle) - No. 8056 & 8057
  - Maradana to Beliatta (Runs via Colombo-fort)
- Sagarika (Ocean Girl) - No. 8096 & 8097
  - Maradana to Beliatta
- Meena Gaya (Singing Fish) - No. 6079
  - Runs between Colombo and Batticaloa
- Pulathisi - No. 6075
  - Colombo fort to Batticloa

=== Discontinued services ===
- Boat Mail (discontinued since 23 December 1964)
  - Service was operated between Colombo and Chennai, India, with ferry service to cross Rama Sethu.
- Hijra
  - Colombo Fort to Batticaloa via Trincomalee

=== Special services ===
- Bradby Express - Colombo to Kandy (connecting the Colombo and Kandy legs of the annual Bradby Shield Encounter of rugby union)

== Airport and aviation services ==
- Airport Express - Colombo Secretariat to Bandaranaike International Airport using a Hitachi Class S5 DMU4.

== J.F. Tours & Travels ==
- Viceroy Special - Colombo to Kandy, Badulla, or Galle; by charter (Tourist excursion train powered by steam)

== See also ==
- Sri Lanka Railways
