= Colombo Terminus railway station =

Railway station in Sri Lanka

Colombo Terminus Railway Station
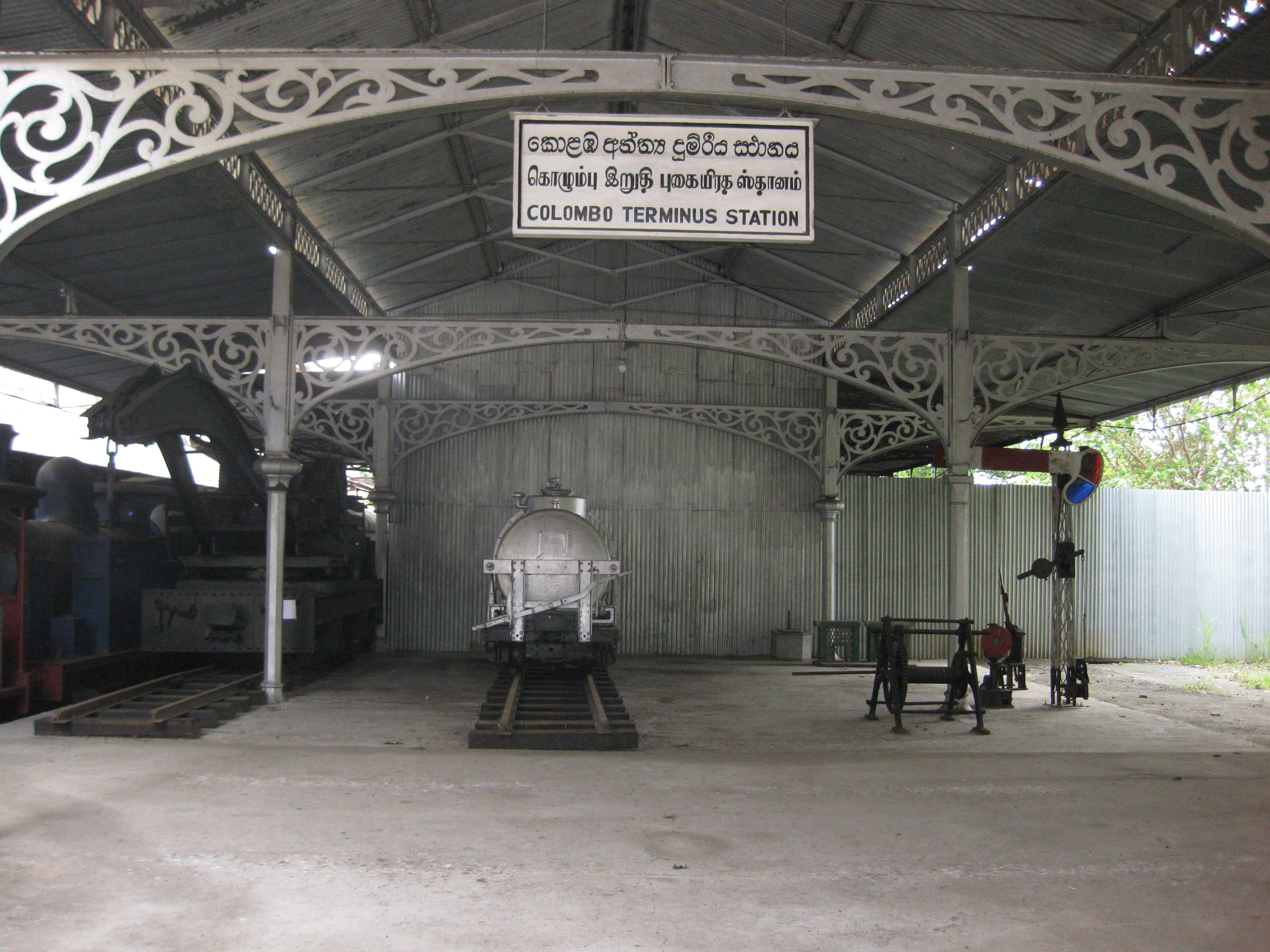

General information
- Owner: Ceylon Government Railways, now Sri Lanka Railways
- Line: Main Line

History
- Opened: 1865
- Closed: 1908

Services
All Main-line trains to Colombo (until 1908)

Colombo Terminus Station was the primary railway station in Colombo, Sri Lanka in the nineteenth century. It was retired from service at the beginning of the twentieth century and replaced by Maradana Station. The preserved building is now home to the National Railway Museum.

== History ==
Colombo Terminus Station was opened in 1865 to serve all trains at Colombo.

In 1906, a project was launched to reorganise the railway within the Colombo area. Colombo Terminus Station was closed and replaced by the new Maradana Station.

In May 2009 the station became the site of the National Railway Museum. The museum moved in December 2014 to Kadugannawa west of Kandy.

== Features ==
Terminus Station was originally the end of the Main Line. The construction of the Coast Line towards Slave Island turned the Terminus Station into a quarter-mile-long siding, making operation inconvenient.

Instead of a clock, a sundial was originally used to tell the time. This would have avoided the cost of installing a mechanically-operated clock.

== See also ==
- Railway stations in Sri Lanka
- Maradana Railway Station
- Colombo Fort Railway Station
- Sri Lanka Railways
