= Matara railway station =

Railway station in Matara, Sri Lanka

Matara මාතර மாத்தறை
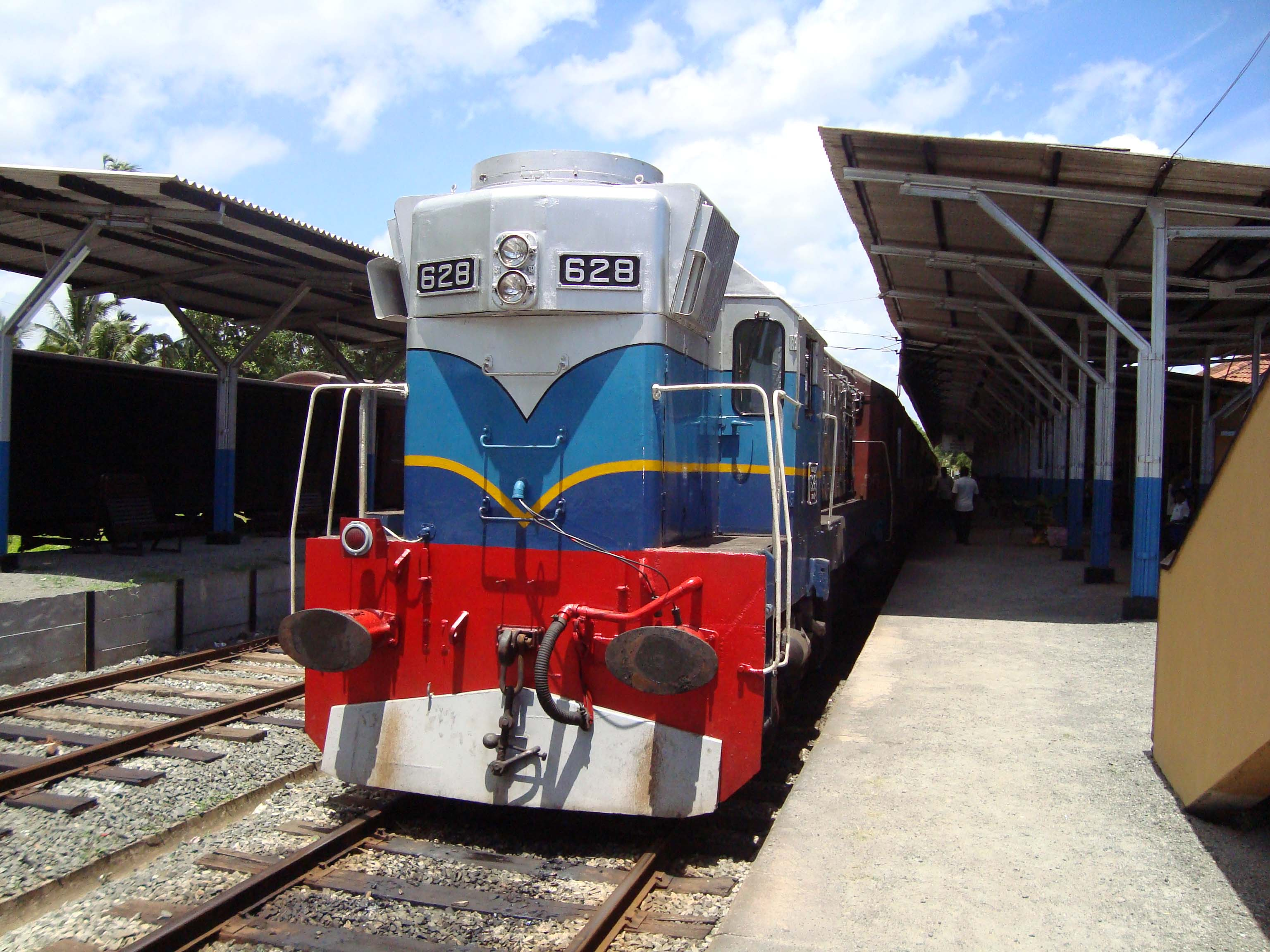
- Train waiting at Matara Railway Station

General information
- Location: Matara, Sri Lanka; Sri Lanka
- System: Sri Lankan Railway Station
- Owner: Sri Lanka Railways
- Line: Coastal Line (Sri Lanka)

Other information
- Status: Functioning
- Station code: MTR
Location

Matara railway station is a station in Matara, Sri Lanka. It is owned and operated by Sri Lanka Railways. Matara railway station opened on 17 December 1895 as the terminus of the Coastal Line.

== Location ==
Matara station is located in the centre of the city, north of the Nilwala River.

== Layout ==
Matara railway station is designed as through station, despite it being the coastal line's current terminus.

== Services ==
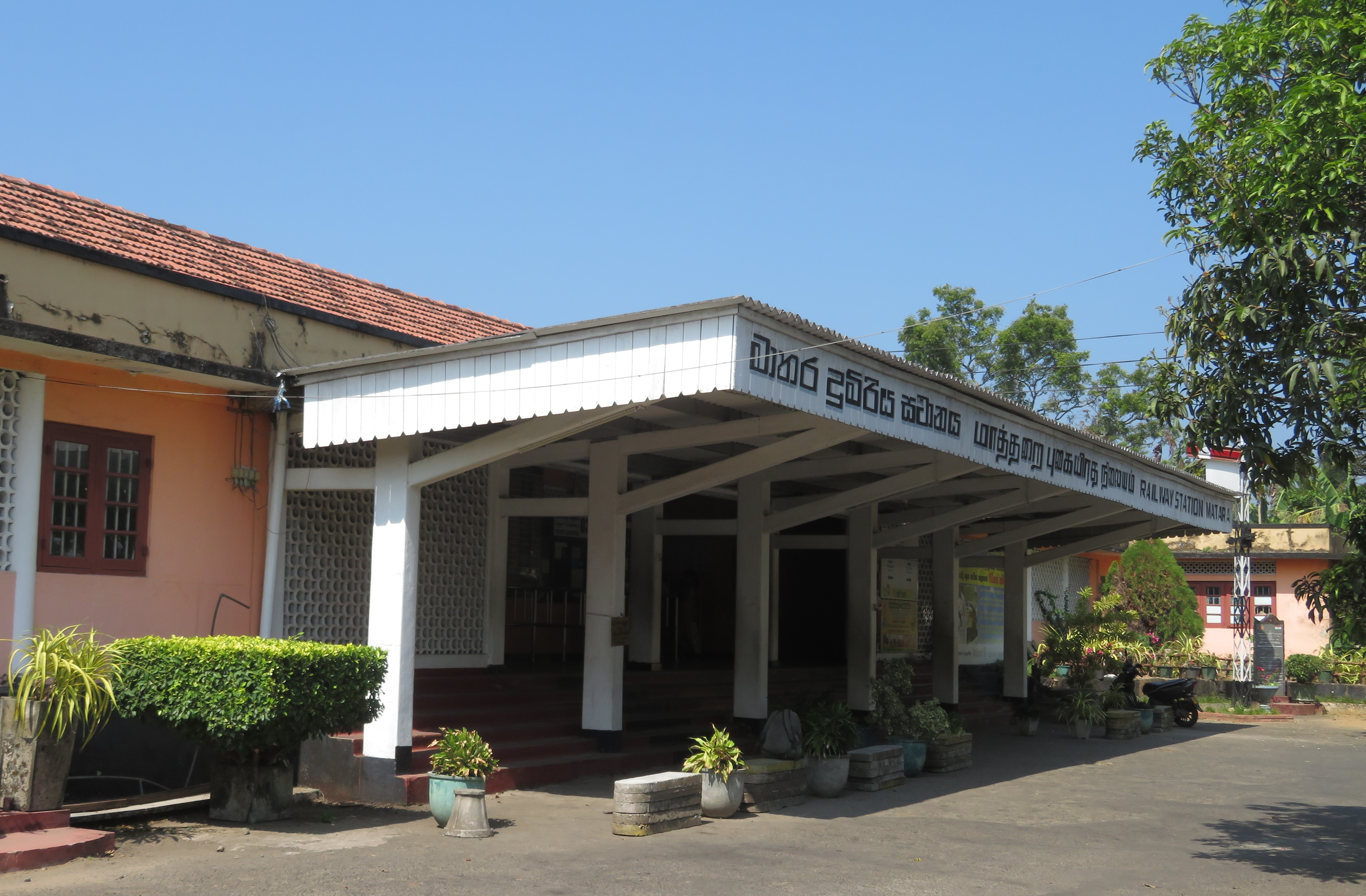
Matara Railway Station

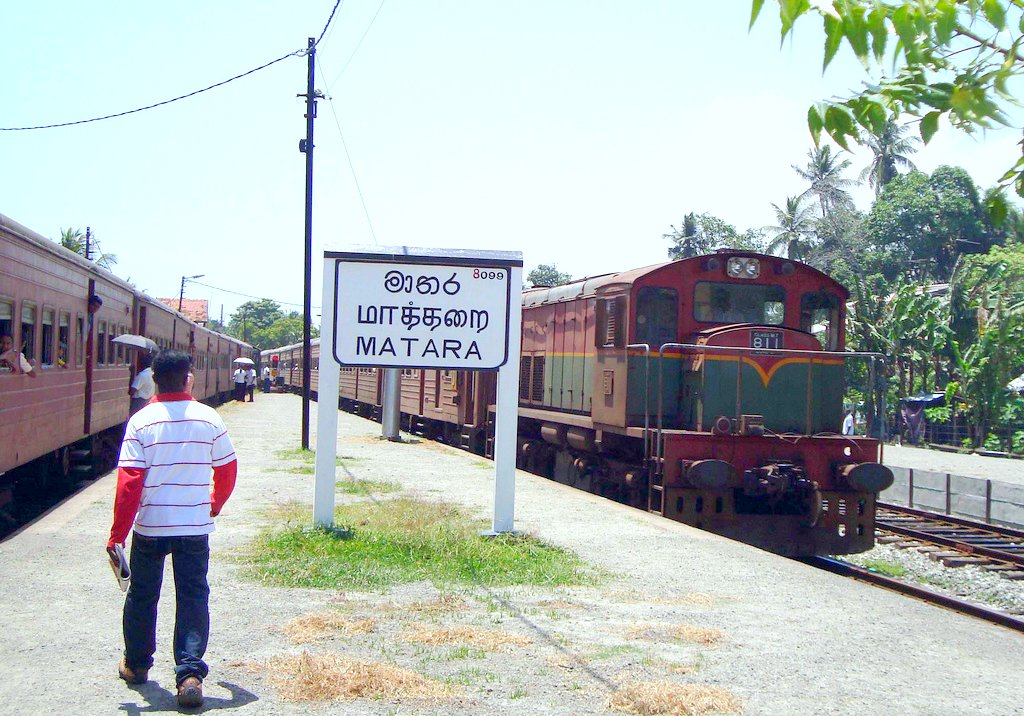
Trains at Matara station

Matara station is served by the Ruhunu Kumari, Galu Kumari, Rajarata Rejini and Sagarika trains. Many other services also operate at Matara. Local trains within the Southern Province connect Matara with Galle, calling at local stations along the route.

=== Inter-city trains ===
Service	Route	Frequency
8039	Colombo Maradana – Colombo Fort – Panadura - Galle – Matara	Daily
8040	Colombo Maradana – Colombo Fort – Panadura - Galle – Matara	Daily
8050 & 8051	Colombo Maradana – Colombo Fort – Panadura - Galle – Matara	Daily
8056 & 8057 Galu Kumari	Colombo Maradana – Colombo Fort – Panadura - Galle – Matara	Daily
8058 & 8059 Ruhunu Kumari	Colombo Maradana – Colombo Fort – Panadura - Galle – Matara	Daily
8085 & 8086	Colombo Fort – Panadura - Galle – Matara	Daily
8093	Colombo Maradana – Colombo Fort – Panadura - Galle – Matara	Saturdays
8096 & 8097 Sagarika	Colombo Maradana – Colombo Fort – Panadura - Galle – Matara	Daily (Different times for weekends)
8311	Colombo Maradana – Colombo Fort – Panadura - Galle - Matara	Daily
8766	Colombo Maradana – Colombo Fort – Panadura - Galle – Matara	Monday – Friday

=== Local trains ===
Service	Route	Frequency
8752, 8338, 8340, 8345, & 8368 Local trains	Galle – Matara	Monday – Friday

=== Continuity ===
Preceding station	Sri Lanka Railways	Following station
Walgama	Coastal Line local trains	Terminus
Weligama	Coastal Line inter-city trains	Terminus
