= Maradana railway station =

Railway station in Colombo, Sri Lanka

Maradana Railway Station මරදාන දුම්රිය ස්ථානය மருதானை ரயில் நிலையம்
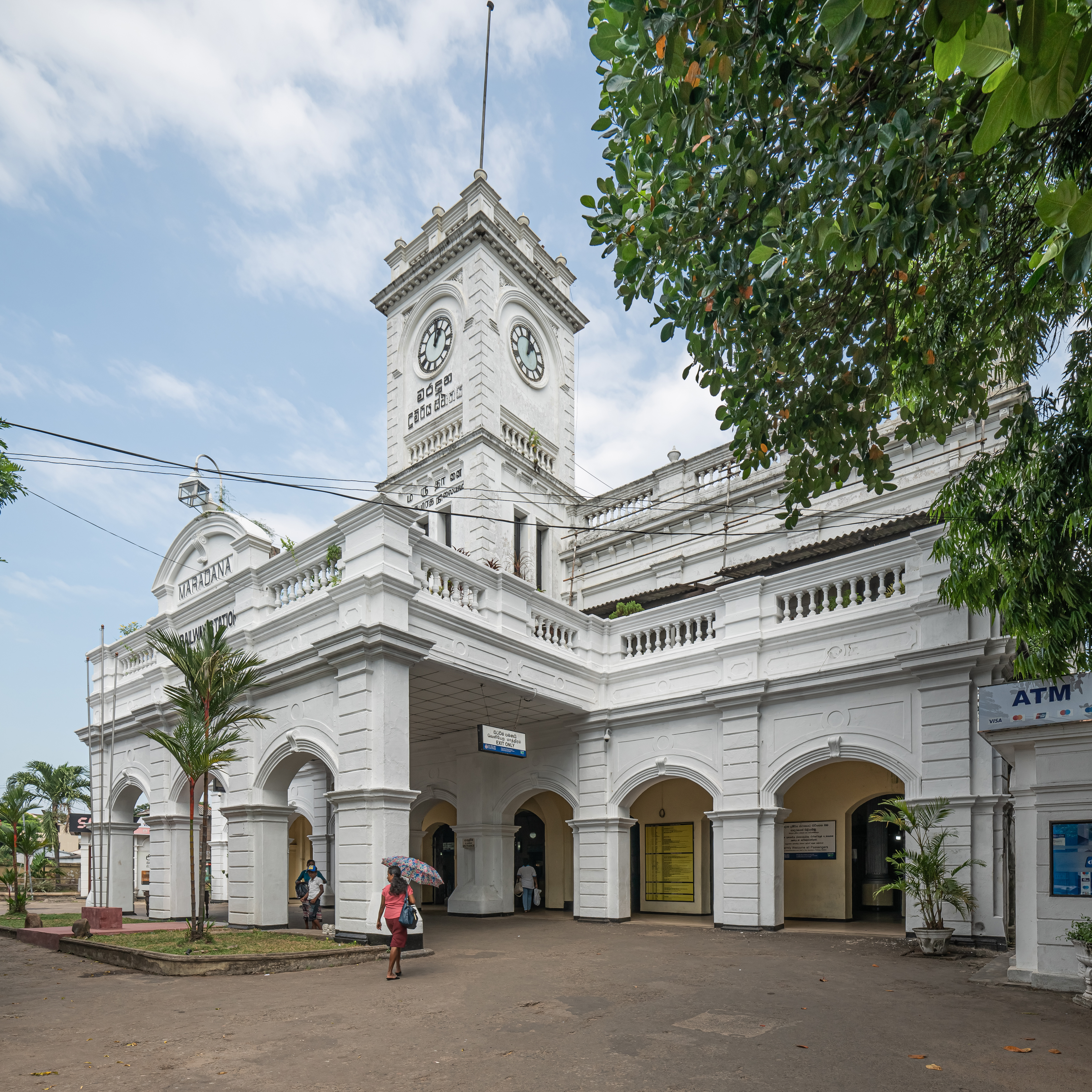
- Maradana railway station with clock tower

General information
- Location: Maradana, Colombo; Sri Lanka
- Coordinates: 6°55′45″N 79°51′56″E
- Owner: Sri Lanka Railways
- Lines: Main Line; Coastal Line; Kelani Valley Line

History
- Opened: 1908
- Electrified: no
Location

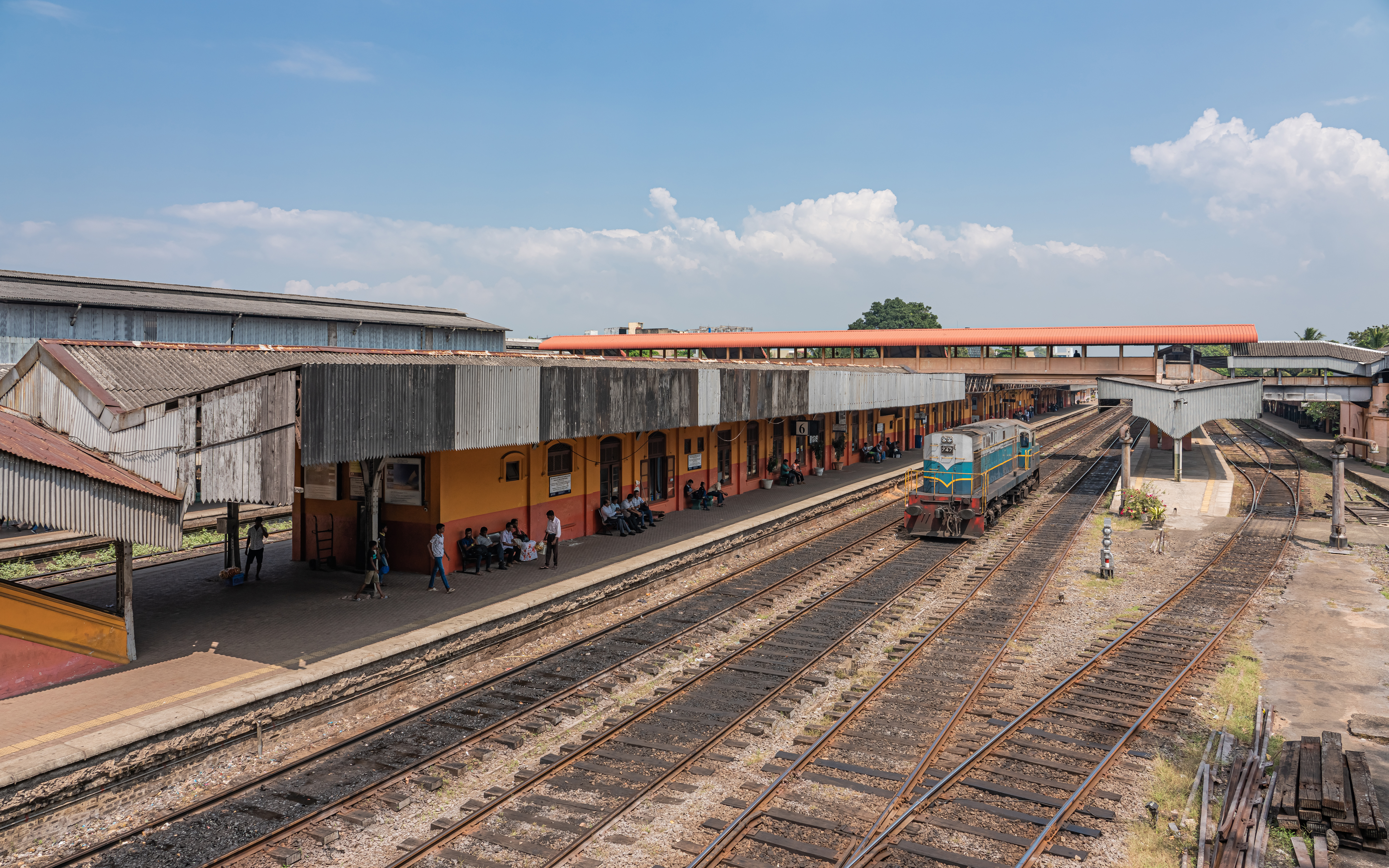
Track interchange at Mardana

Maradana Railway Station (Sinhala: මරදාන දුම්රිය ස්ථානය, Tamil: மருதானை ரயில் நிலையம்) is a major rail hub in Colombo, Sri Lanka. The station is served by Sri Lanka Railways, with many inter-city and commuter trains entering each day. It is the terminus of several intercity trains.

Maradana is home to the suburban-Colombo network's centralised traffic control centre.

== History ==
When the railways first opened in Ceylon (Sri Lanka) in 1864, trains terminated at Colombo Terminus railway station, a now-retired station near Maradana. In 1906, a project was launched to reorganise the railway within the Colombo area. Colombo Terminus Station was closed and replaced by the new Maradana Station.

Fort railway station was opened in 1917, as a new central station for Colombo. Today, Maradana and Fort are the primary rail gateways to Colombo.

== Location ==
Maradana Station is in Maradana, located next to the Elphinstone Theatre and near the Maradana railway yards. Colombo Fort Station is a couple kilometres away from Maradana Station.

== Features ==
Maradana Station features a two-storey building housing the ticket office, waiting room, and Sri Lanka Railways offices. A footbridge leads to the platforms. The main building is an example of British colonial architecture.

The railways operates its centralised traffic control (CTC) for the Colombo area through a facility at Maradana. The CTC handles about 290 trains per day.

== Services ==
The station is served from the north-east by the Main line, which leads to several other major routes in Sri Lanka's railway network. To the south-east of the station, the Kelani Valley Line connects Maradana with many other area of Colombo. The station is served to the west by the Coastal line, leading to Galle and Matara. Most of these Coastal-line trains terminate at Maradana Station.

Maradana station is also a hub for commuter rail within the Colombo metropolis.

=== Inter-city trains ===
Service	Route	Frequency
4001 & 4002 Yal Devi	Colombo Fort – Colombo Maradana – Vavuniya – (Jaffna) – (Kankesanturai)	Daily
4451, 4468 & 4470	Colombo Fort – Colombo Maradana – Ragama - Polgahawela – Kurunegala - Maho	Daily
8085, 8086, 4085, & 4086 Rajarata Rajina	Anuradhapura – Maho – Kurunegala – Polgahawela – Maho – Ragama – Colombo Maradana – Colombo Fort – Panadura - Galle – Matara	Daily
6011 & 6012 Udaya Devi	Colombo Fort – Colombo Maradana – Batticaloa	Daily
1015 & 1016 Udarata Menike	Colombo Fort – Colombo Maradana – Ragama - Polgahawela – Peradeniya - Nawalapitiya - Hatton - Nanu Oya - Pattipola - Ella - Badulla	Daily
1005 & 1006 Podi Menike	Colombo Fort – Colombo Maradana – Ragama - Polgahawela – Peradeniya - Nawalapitiya - Hatton - Nanu Oya - Pattipola - Ella - Badulla	Daily
Tikiri Menike	Colombo Fort – Colombo Maradana – Ragama - Polgahawela – Peradeniya - Nawalapitiya - Hatton - Nanu Oya - Pattipola - Ella - Badulla	Daily
Senkadagala Menike	Colombo Fort – Colombo Maradana – Ragama - Polgahawela – Peradeniya - Kandy	Daily
8058 & 8059 Ruhunu Kumari	Colombo Maradana – Colombo Fort – Panadura - Galle – Matara	Daily
8760 & 8327 Samudra Devi	Colombo Maradana – Colombo Fort – Panadura - Galle – Matara	Daily
8056 & 8057 Galu Kumari	Colombo Maradana – Colombo Fort – Panadura - Galle – Matara	Daily
8096 & 8097 Sagarika	Colombo Maradana – Colombo Fort – Panadura - Galle-Matara-Beliatta	Daily
3427 & 3803 Muthu Kumari	Colombo Fort – Colombo Maradana – Ragama - Negombo – Chilaw - Bangadeniya - Puttalam	Daily

=== Commuter and local trains ===
Route	Frequency
Towards Panadura	-
Towards Veyangoda	-
Towards Ja Ela	-
Kelani Valley Line	-

=== Continuity ===
Preceding station	Sri Lanka Railways	Following station
Terminus	Ruhunu Kumari	Colombo Fort
Terminus	Samudra Devi	Colombo Fort
Terminus	Galu Kumari	Colombo Fort
Terminus	Sagarika	Colombo Fort
Ragama	Muthu Kumari	Colombo Fort
Ragama	Rajarata Rajina	Colombo Fort
Ragama	Udarata Menike	Colombo Fort
Ragama	Podi Menike	Colombo Fort
Ragama	Tikiri Menike	Colombo Fort
Ragama	Senkadagala Menike	Colombo Fort
Baseline Road	Kelani Valley Line	Terminus
Dematagoda	Commuter Rail	Colombo Fort

== See also ==
- Railway stations in Sri Lanka
- Sri Lanka Railways
- List of railway stations by line order in Sri Lanka
