= Rajarata Rejini =

Rajarata Rejini රජරට රැජිණි
Overview
- Service type: Express Train
- Status: In service
- Locale: Sri Lanka
- First service: 26 February 1968
- Current operator(s): Sri Lanka Railways
- Former operator(s): Ceylon Government Railway

Route
- Termini: Anuradhapura; Beliatta
- Distance travelled: 409.78 km (254.63 mi)
- Average journey time: 10 hours 17 mins
- Service frequency: daily
- Train number(s): 4086 (Anuradhapura-Colombo Fort); 8086 (Colombo Fort-Beliatta) (Beliatta - Colombo Fort 8085); 4085 (Colombo Fort - Anuradhapura)

On-board services
- Sleeping arrangements: Not available
- Observation facilities: N\A

Technical
- Track gauge: 5 ft 6 in (1,676 mm)

Rajarata Rejini (Sinhala: රජරට රැජිණි, Queen of the King's Land) is a daytime passenger train that runs between Anuradhapura and Beliatta via Colombo Fort in Sri Lanka.

The Rajarata Rejini is currently the second longest train journey in Sri Lanka covering the more than 3/4 of the Northern Line and the entire length of the Coastal Line (413 km (257 mi)). The Beliatta-bound train departs from Anuradhapura at 5:00am, while the Anuradhapura-bound train leaves Beliatta at 8:45am. The trip takes about 10 hours. Although the train has different train numbers, (e.g.: 4085 Colombo fort - Anuradhapura, 8085 Beliatta - Colombo Fort) same train runs between Anuradhapura and Beliatta.

== Services ==
The train offers two classes

- Second class is more comfortable than the third class.
- Third class typically gets very crowded with commuters, And provide only the basic facilities.

== Route ==
The Rajarata Rejini travels the 3/4 length of Sri Lanka Railways' Northern Line and the entire length of the Coastal Line.

The Rajarata Rejini begins its Southbound service at Anuradhapura and runs south while calling at all the stations up to Polgahawela from Anuradhapura and vice versa. From Polgahawela she begins her express service while calling at Alwawwa, Meerigama, Veyangoda, Gampaha, Ragama, Maradana, Colombo Fort, Mount Lavinia, Panadura, Kaluthara South, Aluthgama, Ambalangoda, Hikkaduwa, Galle, Thalpe, Koggala, Ahangama, Weligama, Kamburugamuwa and Matara, Sri Lanka. From Galle, the train runs backwards to Matara as Galle railways station has been designed as a terminus.

== Rolling Stock ==
The service uses S11 DMUE .

== See also ==
Sri Lanka Railways

List of named passenger trains of Sri Lanka
