= Maradana =

Maradana මරදාන மருதானை
- Suburb
- Location within Greater Colombo Location within Colombo District Location within Sri Lanka
- Coordinates: 6°55′42″N 79°51′51″E
- Country: Sri Lanka
- Province: Western Province
- District: Colombo District
- Time zone: UTC+5:30 (Sri Lanka Standard Time Zone)
- Postal Code: 01000

Maradana is a suburb of Colombo, Sri Lanka. Maradana is the site of Maradana Railway Station, one of the primary railway hubs in the country, serving intercity rail and commuter rail. Maradana also has many railway yards and running sheds. A technical college, many national schools, the Lotus Tower, and business institutions are also located in the area.

A statue of Colonel Henry Steel Olcott, the founder of the Theosophical Society and the first well-known person of European ancestry to make a formal conversion to Buddhism, is located in Maradana.

== Schools ==
- Ananda College
- Asoka College
- Nalanda College, Colombo
- St. Joseph's College, Colombo
- Zahira College, Colombo
- Ananda Balika Vidyalaya
- Gothami Balika Vidyalaya
- Viharamahadevi Balika Vidyalaya
- Brighton International School
- Unique International School

== Transport ==
Located next to the Elphinstone Theatre and near the Maradana Railway Yards, Maradana railway station is a major railway hub. Served by Sri Lanka Railways, it provides one of the two main rail gateways to Colombo. Colombo Fort Station is a couple kilometres away from Maradana Station. The station is served by the Main line, which leads to several other major routes in the railway network, the Kelani Valley Line, which connects Maradana with many other area of Colombo, and the Coastal line, leading to Galle and Matara.
