= Galle railway station =

Railway station in Galle, Sri Lanka

Galle
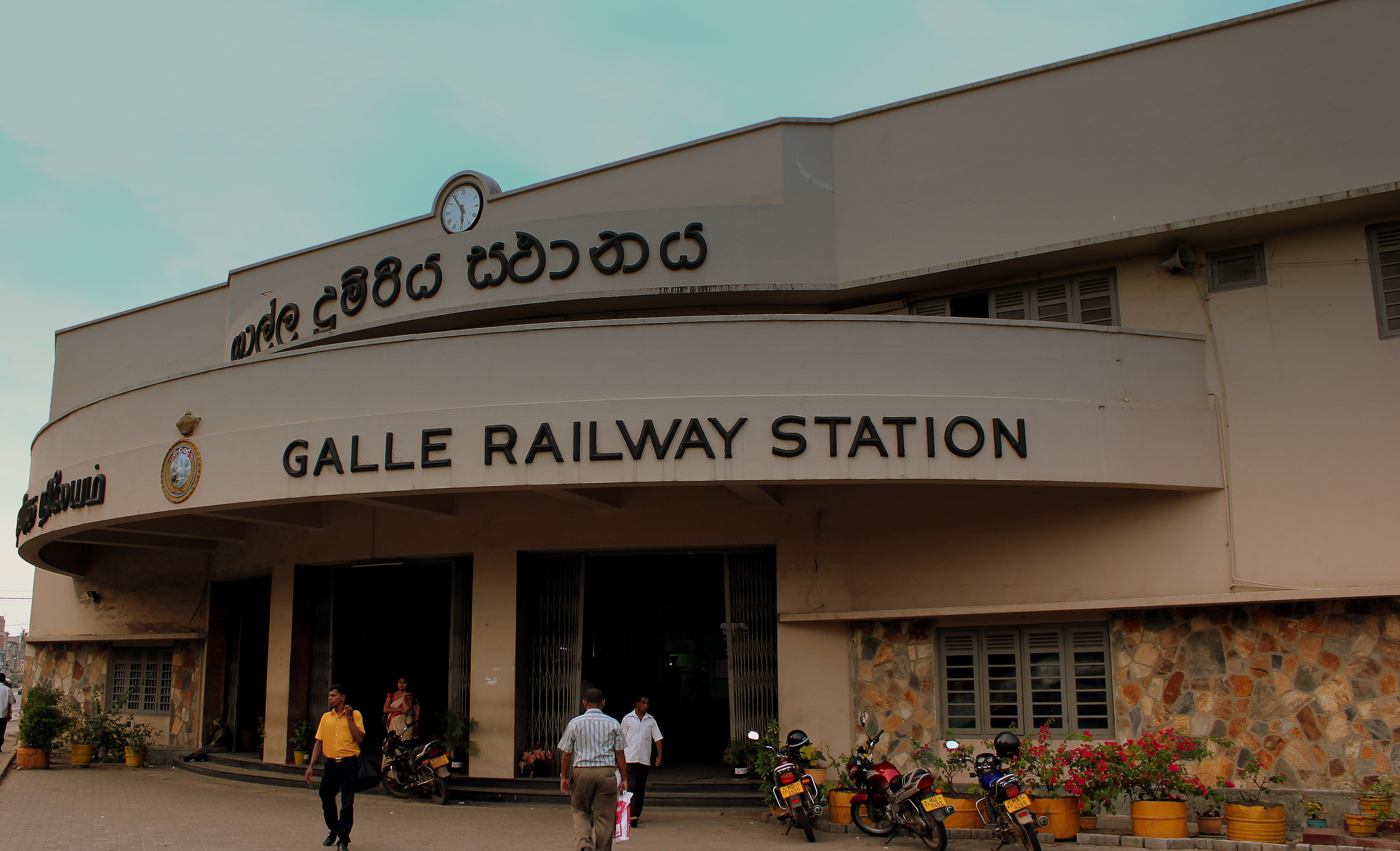
- Entrance porch to Galle railway station

General information
- Location: Galle; Sri Lanka
- System: Sri Lankan Railway Station
- Owner: Sri Lanka Railways
- Line: Coastal Line (Sri Lanka)

Other information
- Status: Functioning
Location

Galle railway station is a railway station in the southern city of Galle in Sri Lanka. Owned by Sri Lanka Railways, the state-run railway operator, the station is part of the Coast Line, which links Sri Lanka's south coast with Colombo.

== Location ==
Galle Station is located in the centre of Galle. It is just northwest of the Galle International Cricket Ground. Galle's City Hall is next to the station and the historic Galle Fort is a short distance from the station.

== Layout ==
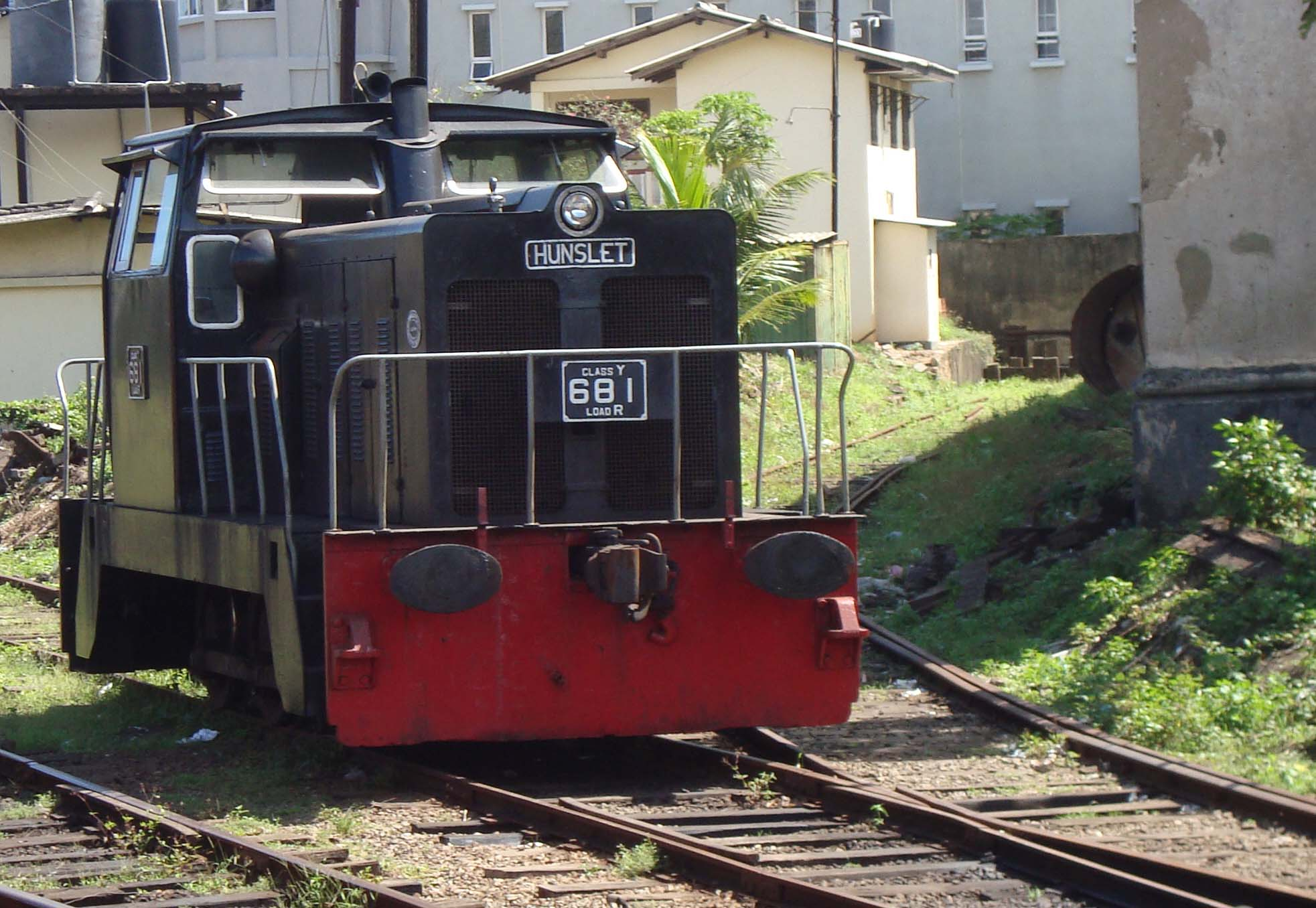
A Class Y shunting locomotive at Galle

Galle station is designed as a terminus station. Thus trains have to back out of the station to continue towards an onward destination. Passengers enter the station from the south and trains approach from the north.

The station's terminal layout has posed some problems in its operation, since all trains have to change directions and reverse out of the station to continue on to their destinations. This can cause long turn-around times and it places the passengers in the opposite direction of where they had been facing.

In 2011, diesel multiple units (DMU) were introduced, as part of a line upgrade. The DMUs reduce turn-around times as locomotives do not need to run around and change ends.

== Architecture ==
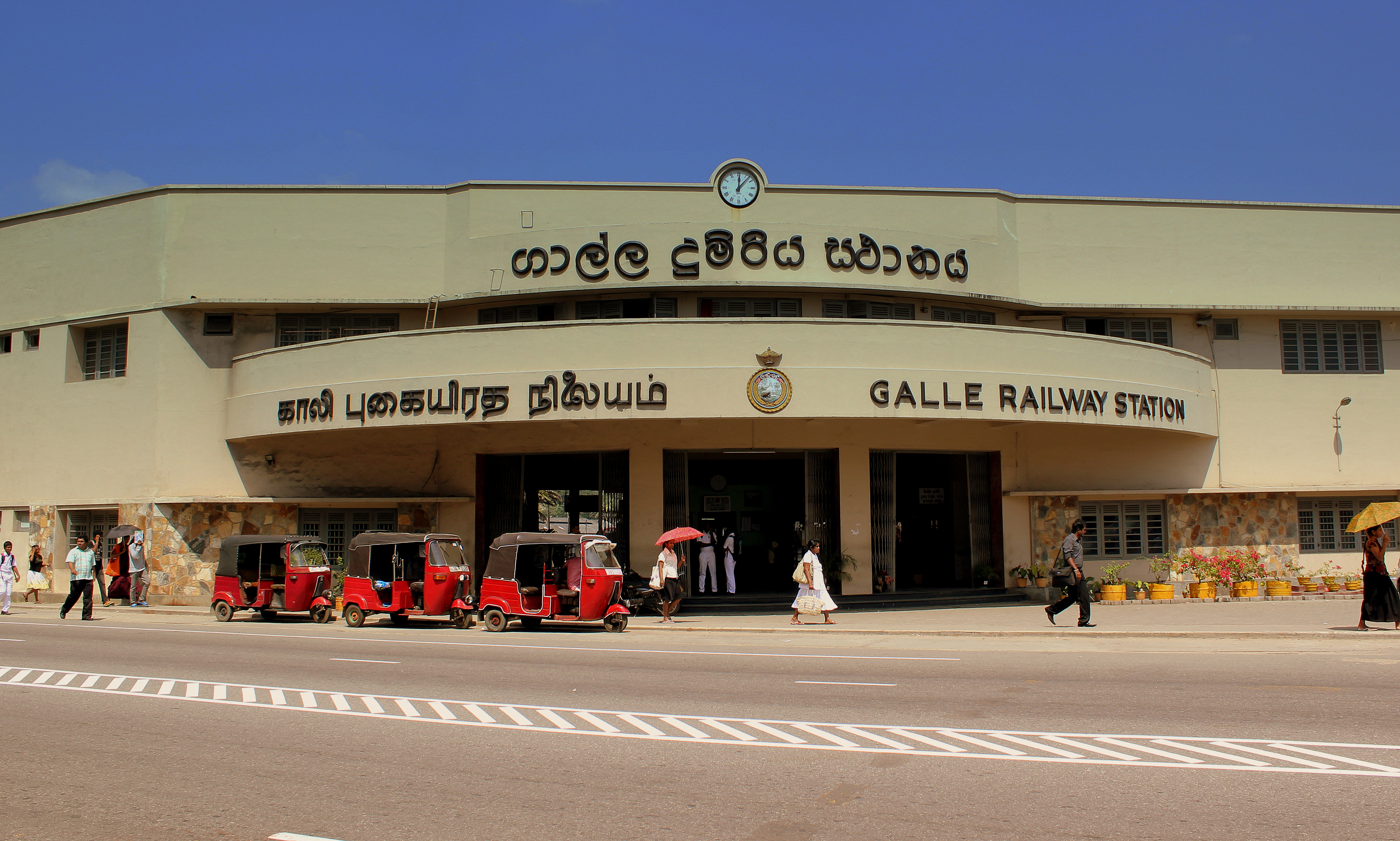
The solid massing and geometry of Galle station demonstrates the mid-twentieth-century International Style.

Galle station is an example of Modernism. The station conforms to the International Style, and uses concrete massing to create a geometric form. Its minimalist walls and simple, bold forms offer a contrast from the highly ornamented, traditional and colonial architecture that surrounds it. Yet the building is symmetric, to tie back to the surrounding architecture and facilitate movement through the building towards the platforms. This contributes to the station's layout as a terminus station. The façade also demonstrates a contrast between the use of different materials. The ornament-free painted surface provides a contrast with the natural stone surface.

The portion of the building that houses the platforms is of a different, more utilitarian design. This features a metal structure that only covers the platforms, but not the trains.

== Services ==
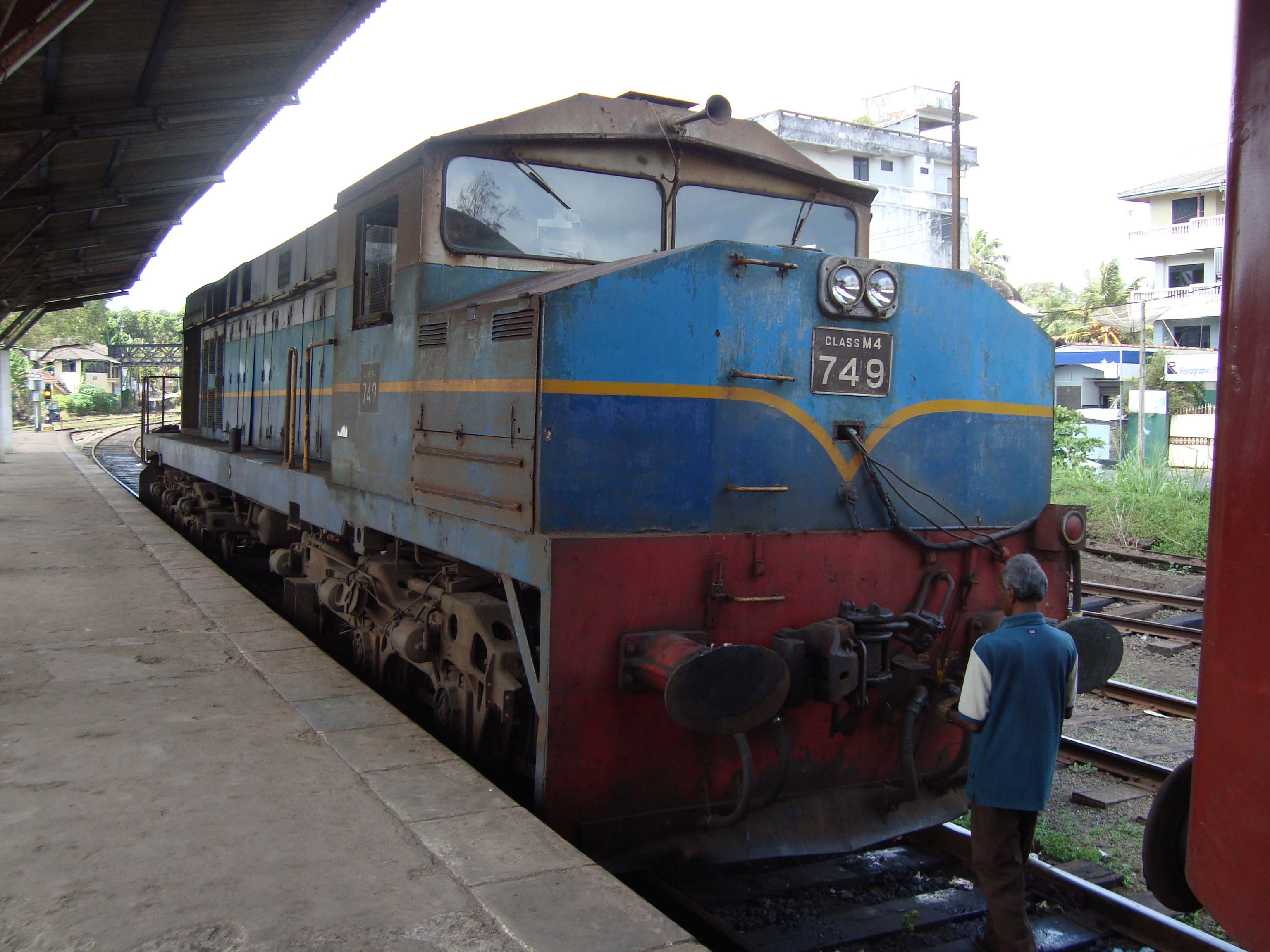
An old M4 locomotive at Galle Station

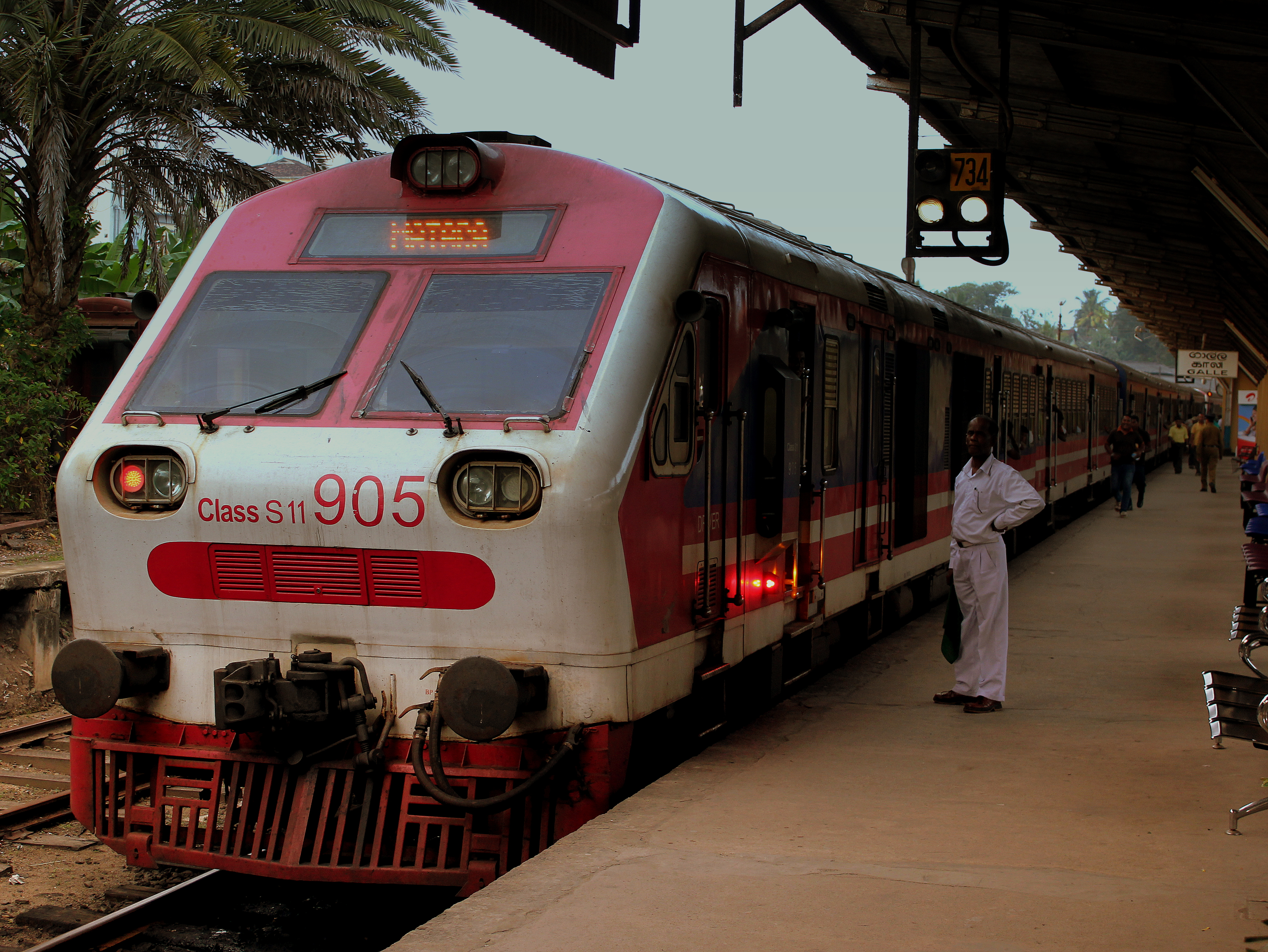
An intercity train at Galle station

Galle station is served by the Ruhunu Kumari, Galu Kumari, and Samudra Devi trains. Various other services also operate at Galle. Local trains within the Southern Province connect Galle with Matara, calling at local stations along the route.

=== Inter-city trains ===
Service	Route	Frequency
8039	Colombo Maradana – Colombo Fort – Panadura - Galle – Matara	Daily
8040	Colombo Maradana – Colombo Fort – Panadura - Galle – Matara	Daily
8050 & 8051	Colombo Maradana – Colombo Fort – Panadura - Galle – Matara	Daily
8053	Colombo Maradana – Colombo Fort – Panadura - Galle	Sundays
8056 & 8057 Galu Kumari	Colombo Maradana – Colombo Fort – Panadura - Galle – Matara	Daily
8058 & 8059 Ruhunu Kumari	Colombo Maradana – Colombo Fort – Panadura - Galle – Matara	Daily
8085 & 8086	Colombo Fort – Panadura - Galle – Matara	Daily
8093	Colombo Maradana – Colombo Fort – Panadura - Galle – Matara	Saturdays
8096 & 8097 Sagarika	Colombo Maradana – Colombo Fort – Panadura - Galle – Beliatta Railway Station	Daily (Different times for weekends)
8311	Colombo Maradana – Colombo Fort – Panadura - Galle - Matara	Daily
8320	Colombo Maradana – Colombo Fort – Panadura - Galle	Saturday – Sunday
8321	Colombo Maradana – Colombo Fort – Panadura - Galle	Saturday – Sunday
8327	Colombo Maradana – Colombo Fort – Panadura - Galle	Daily (Different times for Sundays)
8713	Colombo Maradana – Colombo Fort – Panadura - Galle	Monday – Friday
8714	Colombo Maradana – Colombo Fort – Panadura - Galle	Monday – Friday
8760 & 8327 Samudra Devi	Colombo Maradana – Colombo Fort – Panadura - Galle	Monday – Friday
8764	Colombo Maradana – Colombo Fort – Panadura - Galle	Daily (Different times for weekends)
8766	Colombo Maradana – Colombo Fort – Panadura - Galle – Matara	Monday – Friday
8775	Colombo Maradana – Colombo Fort – Panadura - Galle	Daily

=== Local trains ===
Service	Route	Frequency
8752, 8338, 8340, 8345, & 8368 Local trains	Galle – Matara	Monday – Friday

=== Continuity ===
Preceding station	Sri Lanka Railways	Following station
Richmond Hill	Coastal Line	Katugoda

== See also ==
- List of railway stations in Sri Lanka
- List of railway stations by line order in Sri Lanka
