= Ruhunu Kumari =

Passenger train

- Ruhunu Kumari at Dodanduwa

Overview
- Service type: Inter-city rail
- Locale: Sri Lanka
- Current operator: Sri Lanka Railways

Route
- Termini: Matara; Maradana
- Train numbers: 8058 & 8059

Technical
- Track gauge: 5 ft 6 in (1,676 mm)

Ruhunu Kumari (Sinhala: රුහුණු කුමාරි, Princess of "Ruhuna" - southern province) (Tamil: உருகுண இளவரசி) is a daytime passenger train that runs between Colombo and Matara in Sri Lanka. It was started on 26th October 1955 by the then General Manager of Railways B. D. Rampala, thus becoming the first inter-city express train in Sri Lanka

The train runs from Matara to Maradana in the morning and from Maradana to Matara in the evening. The Matara-bound train departs from Maradana at 3.40 p.m., while the Maradana-bound train leaves matara at 06.05 a.m. The trip takes about 3.48 hours.

== Services ==
The train offers three classes

- First class is more comfortable with AC.
- Second class is more comfortable than the third class.
- Third class typically gets very crowded with commuters, And provide only the basic facilities.

== Route ==
The Ruhunu Kumari travels the length of Sri Lanka Railways' Coastal Line through the south-west coast of Sri Lanka, from Colombo-Fort to Matara.

The Ruhunu Kumari begins its southbound journey at Maradana station and goes to Fort Railway Station, the primary railway station in Colombo. Then she passes stations at Slave Island, Kollupitiya, Bambalapitiya, and Wellawattha, all situated within Colombo city. Then it passes the rapidly growing cities of Dehiwala-Mount Lavinia, Ratmalana, and Moratuwa.

As it enters Kalutara district, passing the Colombo district, Egoda Uyana, Panadura, Pinwattha and Wadduwa are the foremost stations. The train calls at both of Kalutara's stations, Kalutara north and Kalutara south. Next the Ruhunu Kumari passes Katukurunda, the site of Sri Lanka's first railway accident. Payagala north and Payagala south which are the stations of Payagala city are also situated in this line. After Maggona, Beruwala, Hettimulla and Aluthgama stations Ruhunu Kumari enters the Galle district. Bentota, a very popular tourist destination, is the first station situated in Galle district on this line. Induruwa, Kosgoda, Ahungalla, Balapitiya, Ambalangoda, Kahawa, Hikkaduwa, Thiranagama, Dodanduwa, Rajgama, Boossa, Gintota are the main stations situated before Galle. Next the Ruhunu Kumari arrives at Galle station.

Next, the Ruhunu Kumari starts its journey on the Galle-Matara line. The train has to back out of Galle station, due to its terminal-station layout. Katugoda is the first station on the line towards Matara. Unawatuna, Talpe, Habaraduwa, Koggala, Kataluwa and Ahangama are the last stations in Galle district. Midigama, Kumbalgama, Weligama are the foremost stations in the Matara. Polwathumodara, Mirissa, Kamburugamuwa, and Walgama are the next stations. Finally Ruhunu Kumari has come to its destination: Matara.
