= Samudra Devi =

Samudra Devi සමුද්‍ර දේවී
Overview
- Service type: Inter-city rail
- Locale: Sri Lanka
- Last service: present
- Current operator(s): Sri Lanka Railways

Route
- Termini: Galle; Maradana
- Service frequency: Daily
- Train number(s): 8760 (Galle-Maradana); 8760 (Maradana-Galle)

Technical
- Track gauge: 5 ft 6 in (1,676 mm)

Samudra Devi (සමුද්‍ර දේවී) is a daily passenger train in Sri Lanka, operated by Sri Lanka Railways. The train runs on the Coastal line, from Galle to Maradana in the morning, and the return service is in the evening.

== Naming ==
Samudra Devi is sinhala for Queen of the Oceans. Since the mid-1950s, Sri Lanka Railways has been naming its significant passenger trains.

== History ==
The Samudra Devi initially ran as an ordinary long-haul passenger train. It gradually became popular with commuters living along coast commuting to work in Colombo.

== Route ==
The south-bound Samudra Devi begins its journey at Colombo Maradana Station. It runs south from Colombo, following the edge of the Indian Ocean. It offers passengers views of tropical beaches and coconut palms. This line links the regional towns of Moratuwa, Panadura, and Kalutara South, as well as popular beach resorts at Aluthgama, Ambalangoda, and Hikkaduwa. The train then reaches Galle Railway Station.

== See also ==
- List of named passenger trains of Sri Lanka
- Sri Lanka Railways
- 2004 Sri Lanka tsunami train wreck
