= Fort railway station =

Railway station in Colombo, Sri Lanka

Colombo Fort Railway Station කොටුව දුම්රිය ස්ථානය கோட்டை புகையிரத நிலையம்
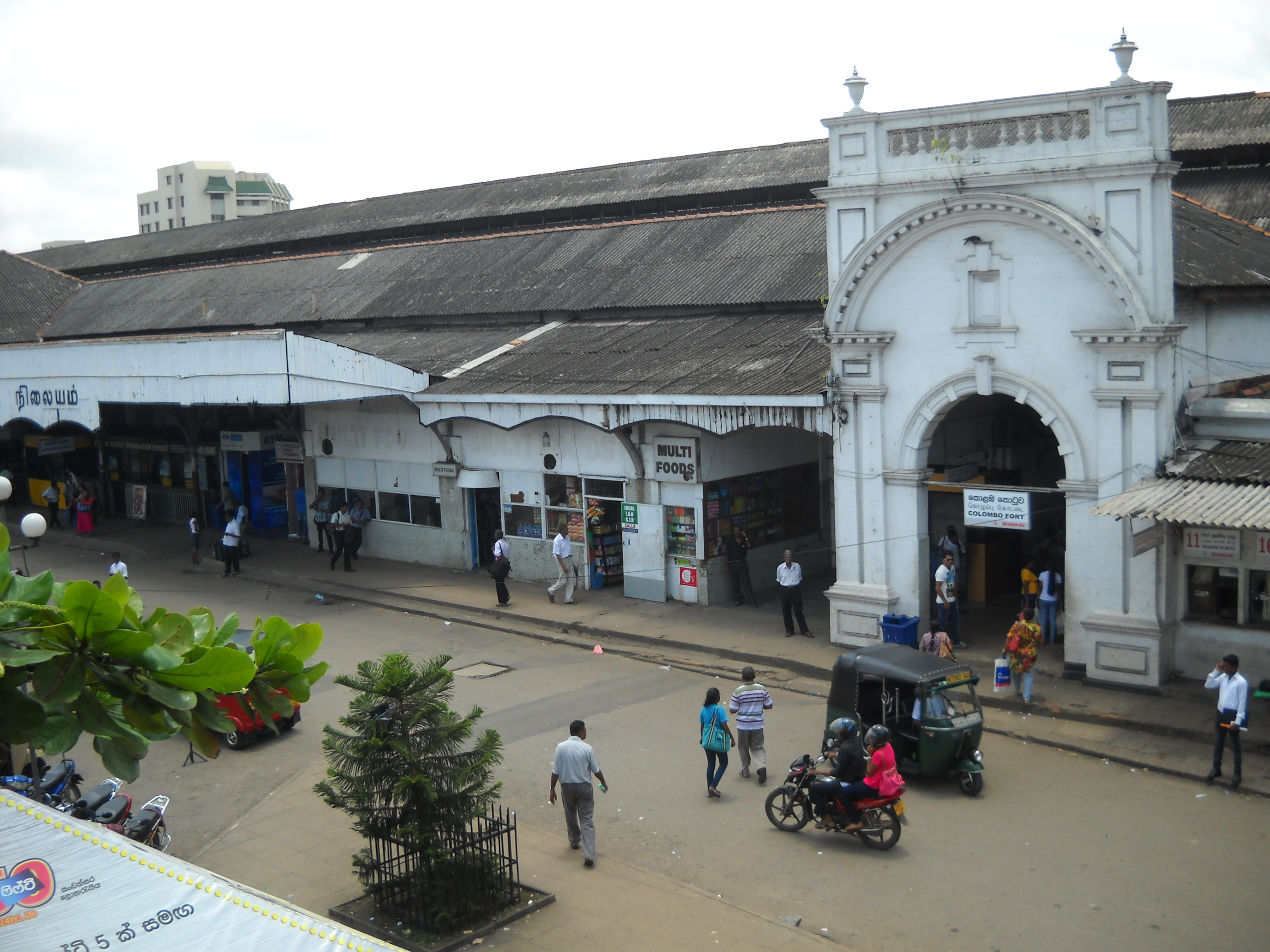
- Colombo Fort Railway Station

General information
- Coordinates: 6°56′01″N 79°51′03″E
- Owner: Sri Lanka Railways
- Lines: Main Line; Coastal Line
- Tracks: 11
- Connections: Buses, via Central Bus Stand, Pettah

Other information
- Station code: FOT

History
- Opened: 1908
- Electrified: no

Passengers
- 73 million annually
Location
- Location within Central Colombo

Fort railway station is a major rail hub in Colombo, Sri Lanka. The station is served by Sri Lanka Railways, with many inter-city and commuter trains entering each day. Fort Station is the main rail gateway to central Colombo; it is the terminus of most intercity trains in the country.

== History ==
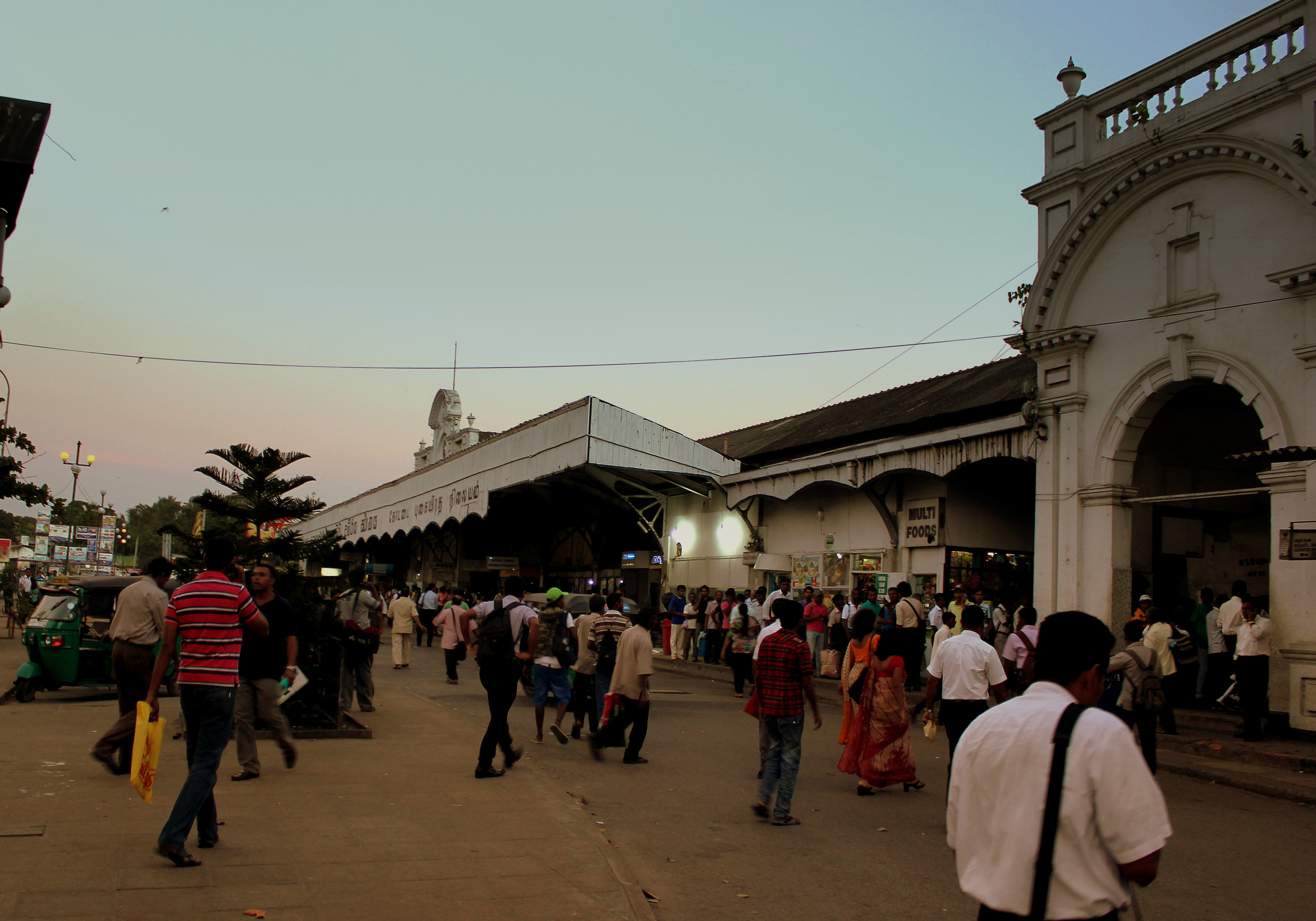
Fort Station is significant for its Victorian-era architecture

When the railways first opened in Ceylon (Sri Lanka) in 1864, trains terminated at Colombo Terminus Station, a now-retired station near Maradana. The earliest station to be called Fort was a small station, built in 1877 when the Coast Line was built. This original station sat on the site of present-day Secretariat Halt just west of today's Fort Station.

The present Fort Station was opened in 1917, as a new central station for Colombo. This has been constructed similar to Manchester Victoria station. The station was built on land reclaimed from the Beira Lake. This project was part of a scheme started in 1906 to reorganize the railway within Colombo, where Colombo Terminus Station was closed and replaced by the new Maradana Station. This was ceremonially opened by G.P. Green who was the General Manager at CGR. Fort was added in 1917 to serve the city centre.

The station was bombed by the LTTE in 2008.

== Location ==
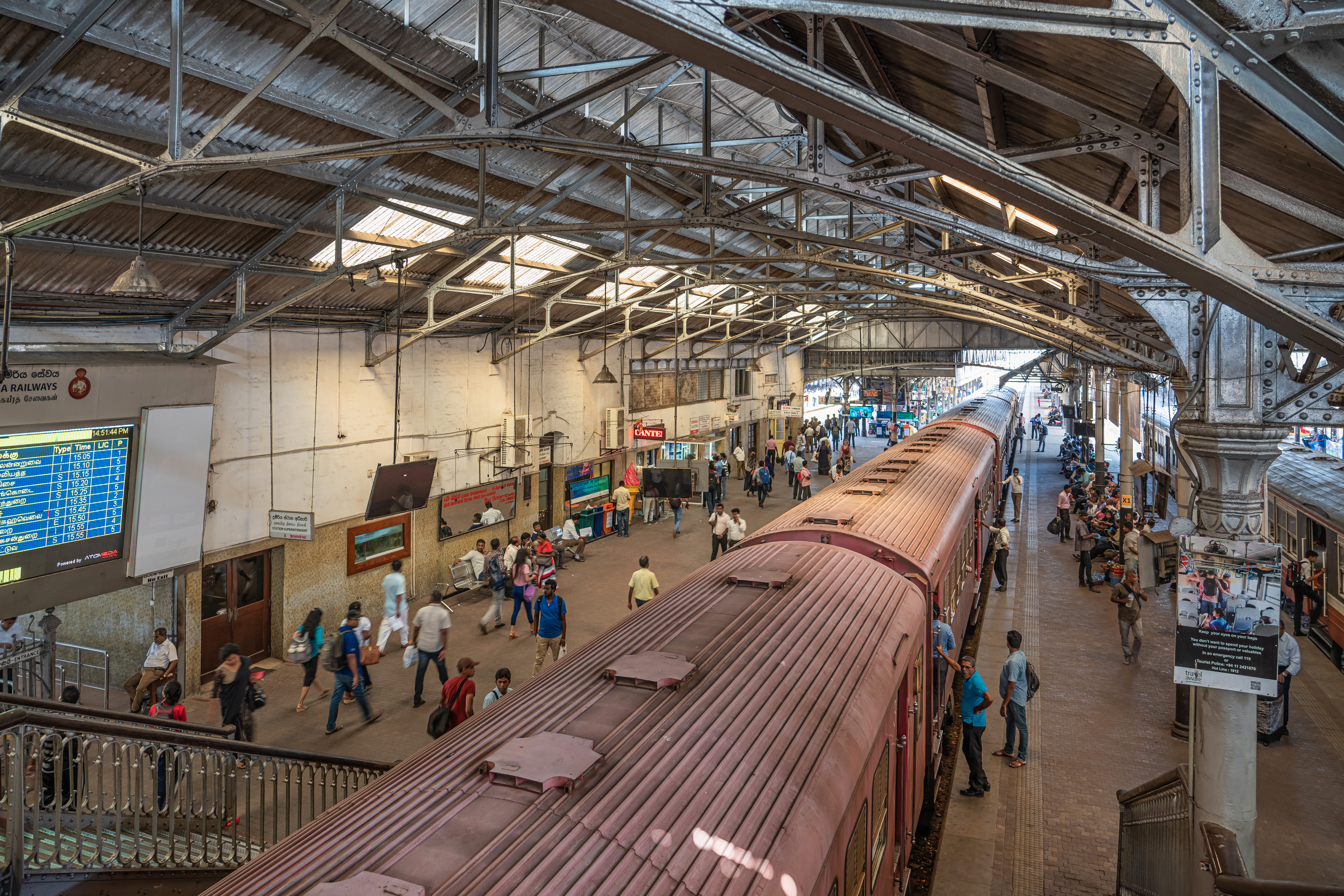
Passengers and trains at rail platforms

Fort Station is in the heart of the city, located next to Colombo Fort and Pettah and close to the meeting points of the A1 and A4 highways. The station provides access to businesses and offices in Colombo Fort, as well as the markets at Pettah.

Fort Station is a couple kilometres away from Maradana Station, the other major rail station in Colombo.

=== Transport connections ===
In addition to providing connection between the many trains that serve the station, Fort Station also provides connections to bus services through the Central Bus Stand in Pettah. Colombo Secretariat Station, the city terminus for the Airport Express, is located to the west of the station, with no direct pedestrian connection.

== Services ==
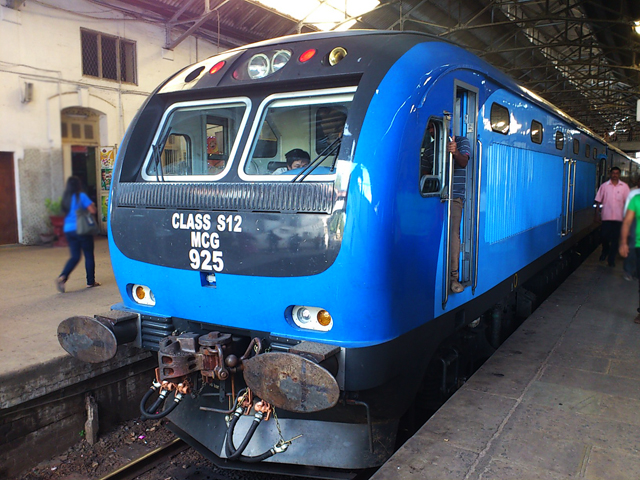
Intercity train at Fort

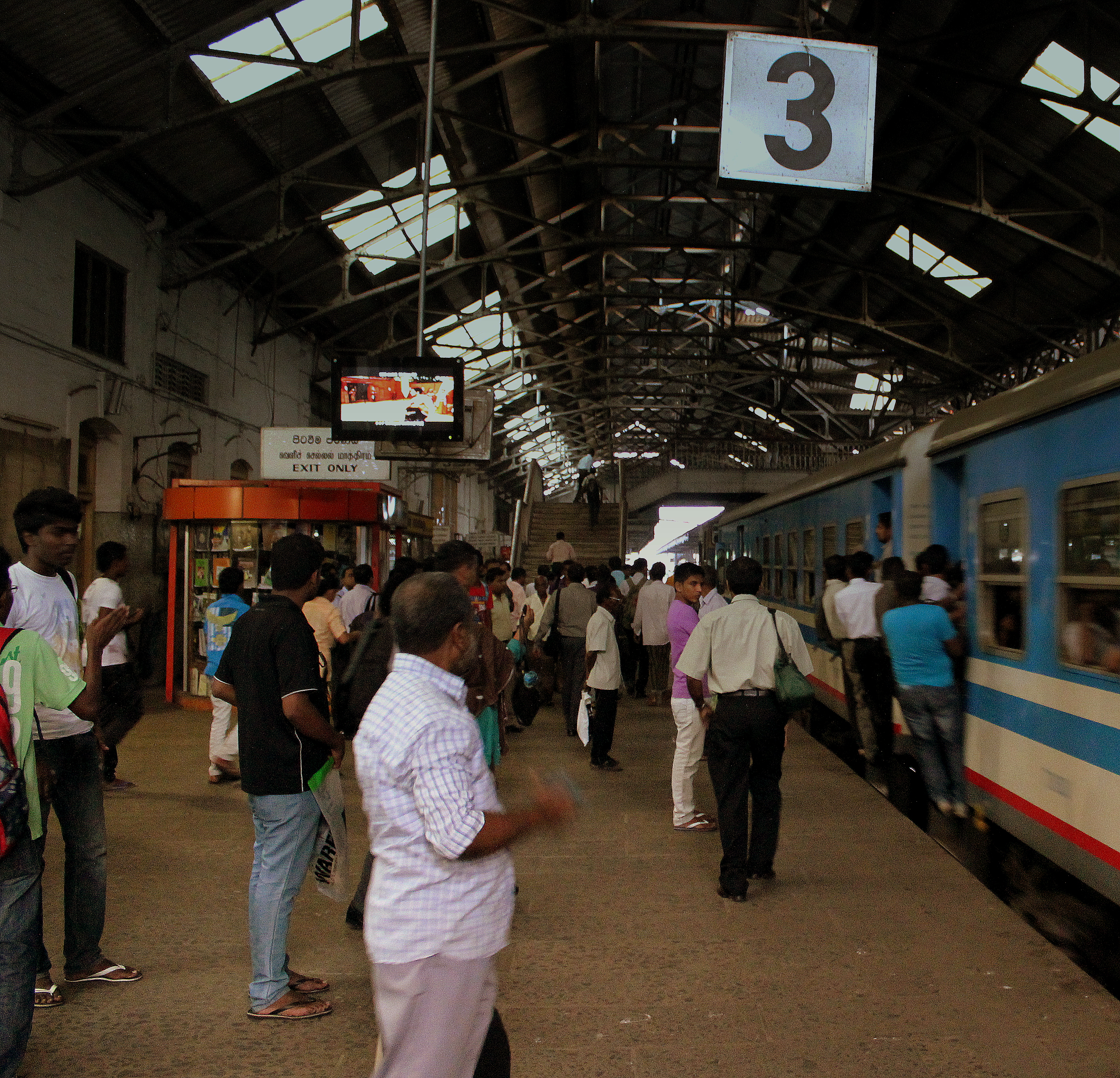
Passengers embarking and alighting at Fort

The station is served from the east by the Main line, which leads to several other major routes in Sri Lanka's railway network. Most of these trains terminate at Fort Station. The station is served to the south-west by the Coastal line, leading to Galle and Matara.

Fort station is also a hub for commuter rail within the Colombo metropolis.

=== Inter-city trains ===
Route	Frequency
Colombo Fort – Colombo Maradana – Vavuniya – Jaffna – Kankesanturai	4 Daily
Colombo Fort – Colombo Maradana – Ragama - Polgahawela – Kurunegala - Maho	4 Daily (3 on weekends)
Anuradhapura – Maho – Kurunegala – Polgahawela – Maho – Ragama – Colombo Maradana – Colombo Fort – Panadura - Galle – Matara	1 Daily
Colombo Fort – Colombo Maradana – Batticaloa	3 Daily
Colombo Fort – Colombo Maradana – Trincomalee	1 Daily
Colombo Fort – Colombo Maradana – Ragama - Polgahawela – Peradeniya - Nawalapitiya - Hatton - Nanu Oya - Pattipola - Ella - Badulla	3 Daily
Colombo Fort – Colombo Maradana – Ragama - Polgahawela – Peradeniya - Kandy	9 Daily (11 on weekends)
Colombo Fort – Colombo Maradana – Ragama - Polgahawela – Peradeniya - Kandy - Nawalapitiya - Hatton - Nanu Oya - Pattipola - Ella - Badulla	2 Daily
Colombo Fort – Colombo Maradana – Ragama - Polgahawela	1 Daily
Colombo Maradana – Colombo Fort – Panadura - Galle – Matara	8 Daily
Colombo Maradana – Colombo Fort – Panadura - Galle	5 Daily (4 on Saturdays)
Colombo Fort – Panadura - Galle – Matara	1 Daily
Colombo Fort – Colombo Maradana – Ragama - Negombo – Chilaw - Bangadeniya - Puttalam	2 Daily (1 on weekends)

=== Commuter and local trains ===
Route	Frequency
Towards Panadura	25
Towards Veyangoda	39
Towards Ja Ela	14
Kelani Valley Line	8

=== Continuity ===
Preceding station	Sri Lanka Railways	Following station
Terminus	Yal Devi	Vavuniya
Terminus	Udaya Devi	Batticaloa
Terminus	Unnamed intercity expresses	Kandy, Batticaloa, Vavuniya, Galle
Terminus	Udarata Menike	Maradana
Terminus	Podi Menike	Maradana
Terminus	Tikiri Menike	Maradana
Terminus	Senkadagala Menike	Maradana
Terminus	Muthu Kumari	Maradana
Bambalapitiya	Rajarata Rajina	Maradana
Bambalapitiya	Ruhunu Kumari	Maradana
Bambalapitiya	Samudra Devi	Maradana
Bambalapitiya	Galu Kumari	Maradana
Bambalapitiya	Sagarika	Maradana
Slave Island	Commuter Rail	Maradana

== Station layout ==
The station has a through-station layout, despite being the terminus for many services. This allows most platforms to serve both terminating and through trains. The platforms are oriented east–west. The ticket hall is to the north of the platforms.

== Trivia ==
The station was used as a film location in the film A Common Man directed by Chandran Rutnam and starring Ben Cross and Ben Kingsley.

== See also ==
- Railway stations in Sri Lanka
- Sri Lanka Railways
- List of railway stations by line order in Sri Lanka
- Sri Lanka Railways
