= Slave Island railway station =

Railway station in Sri Lanka

Company Roads Railway Station
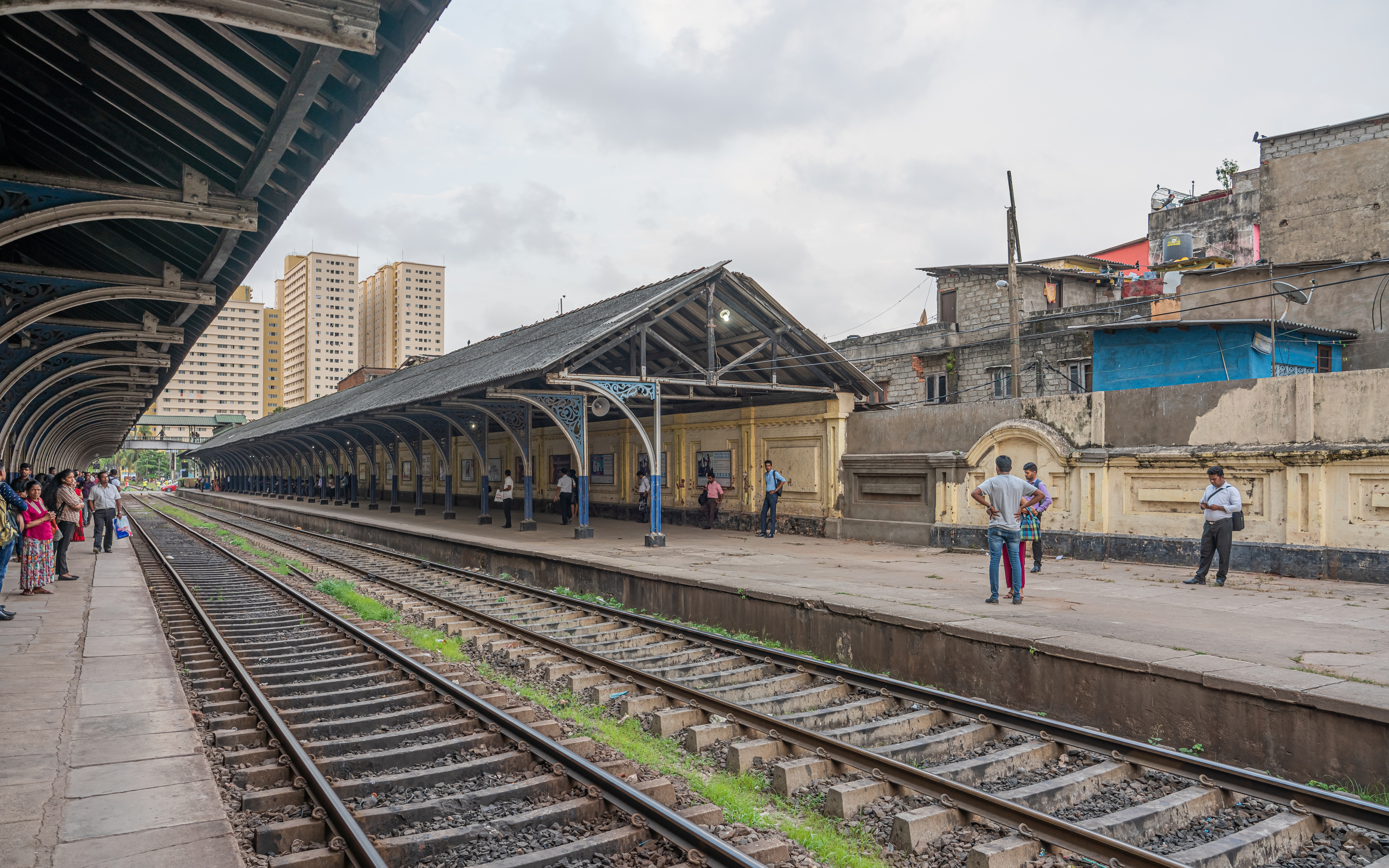

General information
- Coordinates: 6°55′25″N 79°50′58″E
- Owner: Sri Lanka Railways
- Line: Coastal Line
- Platforms: 2
- Tracks: 2

History
- Electrified: no

Services
Commuter Rail
Location
- Location within Central Colombo

Company Roads Railway Station (also known as Kompanna Vidiya Railway Station) is a railway station in Colombo, Sri Lanka. It serves the Company Roads area in the centre of the city. It is served by commuter rail. The station building is significant for its historic architecture.

== History ==
Company Roads Station was built during the colonial era. It was built in the 1870s, under the government of Governor William Henry Gregory. The Coastal Line was originally designed across the Galle Face Green, but due to requests by the public to avoid the promenade, an alternate route was made through Slave Island. The Slave Island Railway station was built shortly after the construction of the track.

In 1913 it became the first station on the Coastal Line to have a double platform.

== Architecture ==
The station carries significant architectural and historic value. The station displays stylish arches, intricate woodwork and metal installations, and the signature Victorian mixing of iron and stone. According to Sirisena Rajapkashe, author of The History of Sri Lankan Railways, the architecture of the station was influenced by the era stations on the Liverpool-Manchester line and the London-Birmingham line in Britain.

The station is now a historic building that receives preservation support by the John Keells Foundation. John Keells also supports the restoration of worn-out features. Part of the work also involves the ambience of the station building; lights, paint, and paving are being improved for a better environment for commuters.

== Location ==
Located in the Company Roads area, just east of the Galle Face Green, the station sits in a commercial locale with business establishments, hotels, and shopping centers.

== Services ==
Company Roads is served by commuter rail services of Sri Lanka Railways.

| Preceding station | Sri Lanka Railways | Following station |
|---|---|---|
| Secretariat Halt | Commuter Rail | Kollupitiya |
