= Kurunegala railway station =

Railway station in Sri Lanka

Kurunegala Railway Station කුරුණෑගල දුම්රිය ස්ථානය குருநாகலை ரயில் நிலையம்
- Train departing from Kurunegala Railway Station

General information
- Location: Kurunegala Station Road, Kurunegala; Sri Lanka
- Coordinates: 7.4767°N 80.374°E
- System: Railway Station
- Owner: Sri Lanka Railways
- Operator: Sri Lanka Railways
- Line: Northern Line
- Distance: 93.80 km (58.28 mi) (from Fort)
- Platforms: 3
- Tracks: 5

Other information
- Status: active
- Station code: KRN

History
- Electrified: No
Location

Kurunegala Railway Station (Sinhala: කුරුණෑගල දුම්රිය ස්ථානය, Tamil: குருநாகலை ரயில் நிலையம்) is a major station, situated in the Kurunegala District, North Western Province, Sri Lanka. It is the 5th railway station on the Northern Line and 39th overall from the Colombo Fort Railway Station, at an elevation of 122.86 metres (403.1 ft) above sea level. The station is located 2.2 km (1.4 mi) away from Kurunegala's town centre.

The station serves as a terminus for several trains, with all trains running on the Northern Line, Trincomalee Line, and Batticaloa Line, stopping at the station, however a number of Intercity express trains do not stop at the station. The station has one platform with several passing loops or sidings and a crossing loop to facilitate the switching of terminating trains.

== History ==
The Jaffna Railway Commission report published in 1891 recommended the construction of a new railway line (now known as the northern line) from Polgahawela to Kurunegala and a survey of a line to Jaffna. The line would join the Main Line at Polgahawela Junction, allowing trains to run to the capital, Colombo. Approval to construct the line was granted in 1892 and the new line to Kurunegala officially opened on 14 February 1894 by Governor Sir Arthur Elibank Havelock. Construction of the rest of Northern Line continued, and on 1 August 1905, the first train from Colombo arrived at Jaffna Railway Station.

== Continuity ==
Preceding station	Sri Lanka Railways	Following station
Nailiya	Northern Line	Muttetugala

== Timetable ==
Kurunegala Railway Station Timetable
Name	Train Number	Origin	Origin Time	Time departuring Kurunegala	Destination	Destination Time	Type of the train	Type of the loco/coaches	Available Days
Batticaloa/Trincomalee Night Mail		Batticaloa/Trincomalee	7.00 pm	1.09 am	Colombo Fort	3.30 am	Night Mail Train	M4	
Kankesanthurai Night Mail		Kankesanthurai	6.00 pm	1.45 am	Colombo Fort	4.05 am	Night Mail Train	M4	
Batticaloa ICE		Batticaloa	8.15 pm	2.49 am	Colombo Fort	4.53 am	Intercity Express Train	M4	
Talaimannar Night Mail		Talaimannar	9.40 pm	3.42 am	Colombo Fort	6.00 am	Night Mail Train	M4	
		Ganewatte	3.55 am	4.20 am	Polgahawela	4.55 am		S9	
		Maho	4.45 am	5.37 am	Colombo Fort	7.46 am		S9	
		Kurunegala		6.20 am	Colombo Fort	8.35 am	Express Train	S11	
		Polgahawela	6.15 am	6.50 am	Maho	7.48 am			
Udaya Devi	6011	Colombo Fort	6.05 pm	7.56 am	Batticaloa	2.45 pm	Express Train	M4	
Rajarata Rejini	4086	Vavuniya	3.35 am	7.57 am	Matara	1.47 pm	Express Train	M4	
Yal Devi	4001	Mount Lavinia	5.50 am	8.29 am	Kankesanthurai	3.20 pm	Express Train	M10	
Vavuniya ICE		Vavuniya	5.45 am	8.53 am	Colombo Fort	10.36 am	Intercity Express Train	M2a	
		Kurunegala		8.55 am	Maho	10.25 am			
Uttara Devi	4018	Kankesanthurai	5.30 am	11.11 am	Colombo Fort	01.05 pm	Intercity Express Train	S11	
		Colombo Fort	8.50 am	11.16 am	Talaimannar	5.33 pm		M4	
		Matara		11.45 am	Jaffna	6.55 pm	Express Train	S11	Saturdays only
		Anuradhapura	6.55 am	11.50 am	Maradana	4.02 pm			
Udaya Devi	6012	Batticaloa	6.10 am	12.53 pm	Colombo Fort	3.15 pm	Express Train	M4	
Uttara Devi	4017	Colombo Fort	11.50 am	1.30 pm	Kankesanthurai	6.47 pm	Intercity Express Train	S11	
		Talaimannar	7.35 am	1.38 pm	Colombo Fort	4.05 pm		M4	
		Kurunegala		2.00 pm	Maho	3.43 pm			
		Jaffna	8.20 am	2.29 pm	Matara	7.20 pm	Express Train	S11	Sundays only
		Maradana	10.00 am	2.35 pm	Anuradhapura	6.08 pm			
		Maho	1.45 pm	3.24 pm	Polgahawela	4.05 pm			
Rajarata Rejini	4085	Matara	9.40 am	3.50 pm	Vavuniya	8.17 pm	Express Train	M4	
		Maho	2.32 pm	4.00 pm	Polgahawela	4.35 pm			
Yal Devi	4002	Kankesanthurai	8.25 am	4.28 pm	Mount Lavinia	6.58 pm	Express Train	M10	
Vavuniya ICE		Colombo Fort	3.55 pm	5.37 pm	Vavuniya	9.06 pm	Intercity Express Train	M2a	
		Colombo Fort	4.40 pm	6.47 pm	Kurunegala		Express Train	S11	
		Polgahawela	6.10 pm	6.50 pm	Maho	7.40 pm			
		Colombo Fort	5.15 pm	7.22 pm	Ganewatte		Express Train	S9	
		Colombo Fort	6.00 pm	7.55 pm	Maho	8.45 pm	Express Train	S9	
		Kurunegala		7.40 pm	Maho	9.26 pm			
Batticaloa ICE		Colombo Fort	7.00 pm	8.57 pm	Batticaloa	3.55 am	Intercity Express Train	M4	
Talaimannar Night Mail		Colombo Fort	7.15 pm	9.21 pm	Talaimannar	3.16 am	Night Mail Train	M4	
Kankesanthurai Night Mail		Colombo Fort	8.30 pm	10.27 pm	Kankesanthurai	6.05 am	Night Mail Train	M4	
Batticaloa/Trincomalee Night Mail		Colombo Fort	9.30 pm	11.40 pm	Batticaloa/Trincomalee	06.55/5.30 am	Night Mail Train	M4	

== See also ==
- List of railway stations in Sri Lanka
- List of railway stations by line order in Sri Lanka
