= Udaya Devi =

Udaya Devi │ උදය දේවි
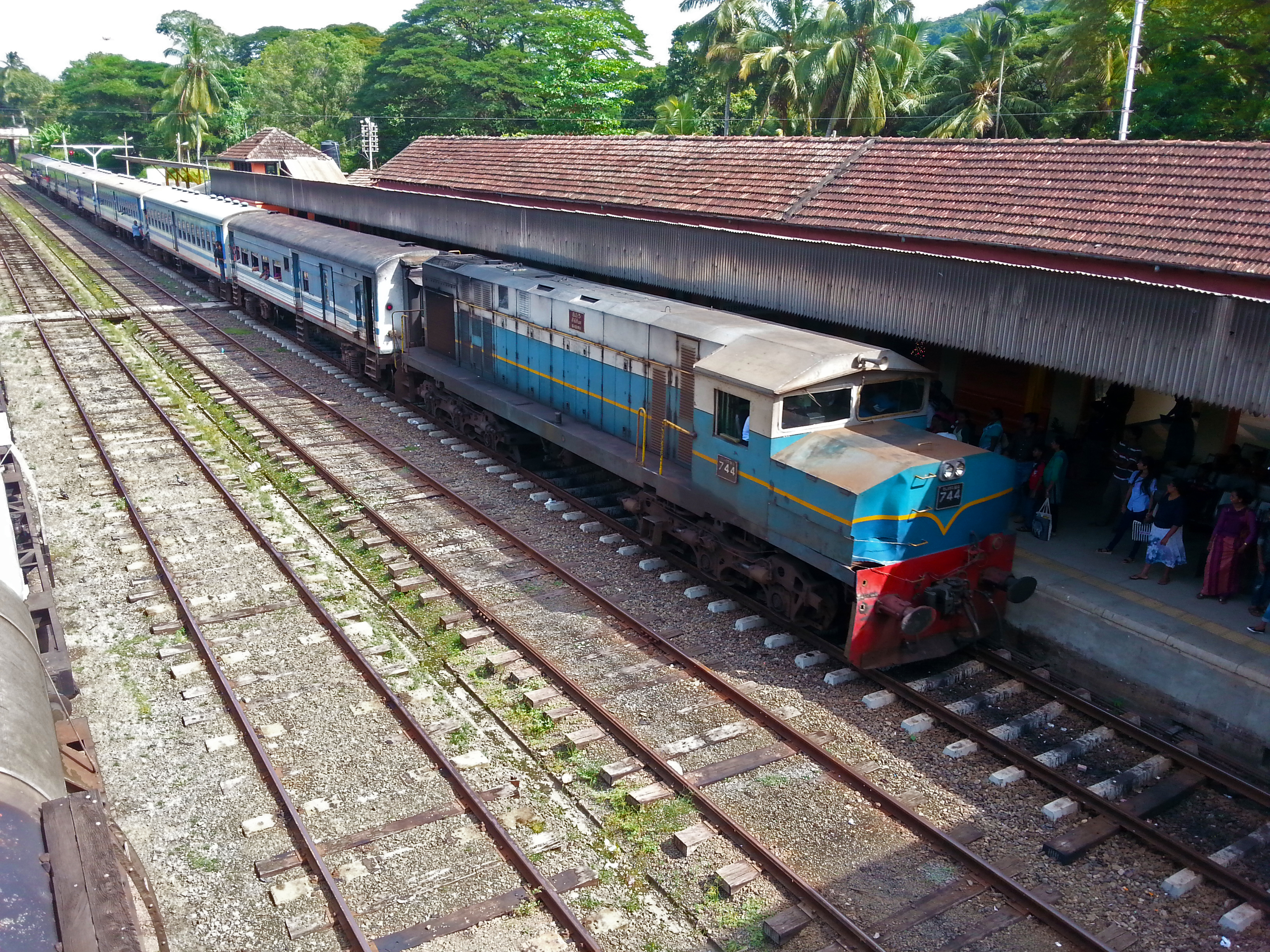
- Udaya Devi express train at Kurunegala Railway Station

Overview
- Service type: Express Train
- Status: In service
- Locale: Sri Lanka
- Current operator: Sri Lanka Railways
- Former operator: Ceylon Government Railway

Route
- Termini: Colombo Fort railway station Batticaloa
- Stops: Outbound train = 34 Inbound train = 35
- Distance travelled: 349.7 km (217.3 mi)
- Average journey time: 8 hours 40 minutes
- Service frequency: Daily
- Train numbers: 6011 (Colombo-Batticaloa); 6012 (Batticaloa-Colombo)

On-board services
- Classes: Second and Third class
- Disabled access: Restricted due to age of rolling stock
- Seating arrangements: 2-2 configuration in second and third class
- Sleeping arrangements: N/A
- Catering facilities: Catering is provided via Buffet car or vendors
- Observation facilities: N/A
- Entertainment facilities: N/A
- Baggage facilities: Overhead racks with baggage racks available.

Technical
- Rolling stock: Class M2 and M6 locomotives. Tantri Refurbished Romanian coaches are used.
- Track gauge: 5 ft 6 in (1,676 mm)
- Electrification: N/A
- Operating speed: Max: 85 KMPH Average: 50/60 KMPH

Udaya Devi (Sinhala: උදය දේවි, Princess/Queen of the Rise/Morning) is an Express train that runs between Colombo Fort and Batticaloa in Sri Lanka.

The Udaya Devi is one of three trains that runs between Colombo Fort and BatticaloaThe other trains are Pulathisi Intercity train and Night mail train that runs between Colombo and Batticaloa.

Batticaloa-bound train departs from Colombo at 6.05 a.m. while Colombo-bound train departs from Batticaloa at 6:00 a.m.

== Services ==
This train offers two classes. (During the ICF coach trials, the train also offered first class accommodations, which included entertainment screens and air conditioning)

- Second class is more comfortable than the third class, But it is more expensive and provides better facilities than Third class.
- Third class typically gets very crowded with commuters, And only provides basic facilities.
- At times, buffet cars are included on the trains, and at other times, they are not. When they are available, passengers have the opportunity to buy snacks and beverages from the canteen onboard the buffet cars. However, when buffet cars are not present, vendors take advantage of the situation by boarding the train to sell snacks, beverages, and other items.

== Route and Stops ==
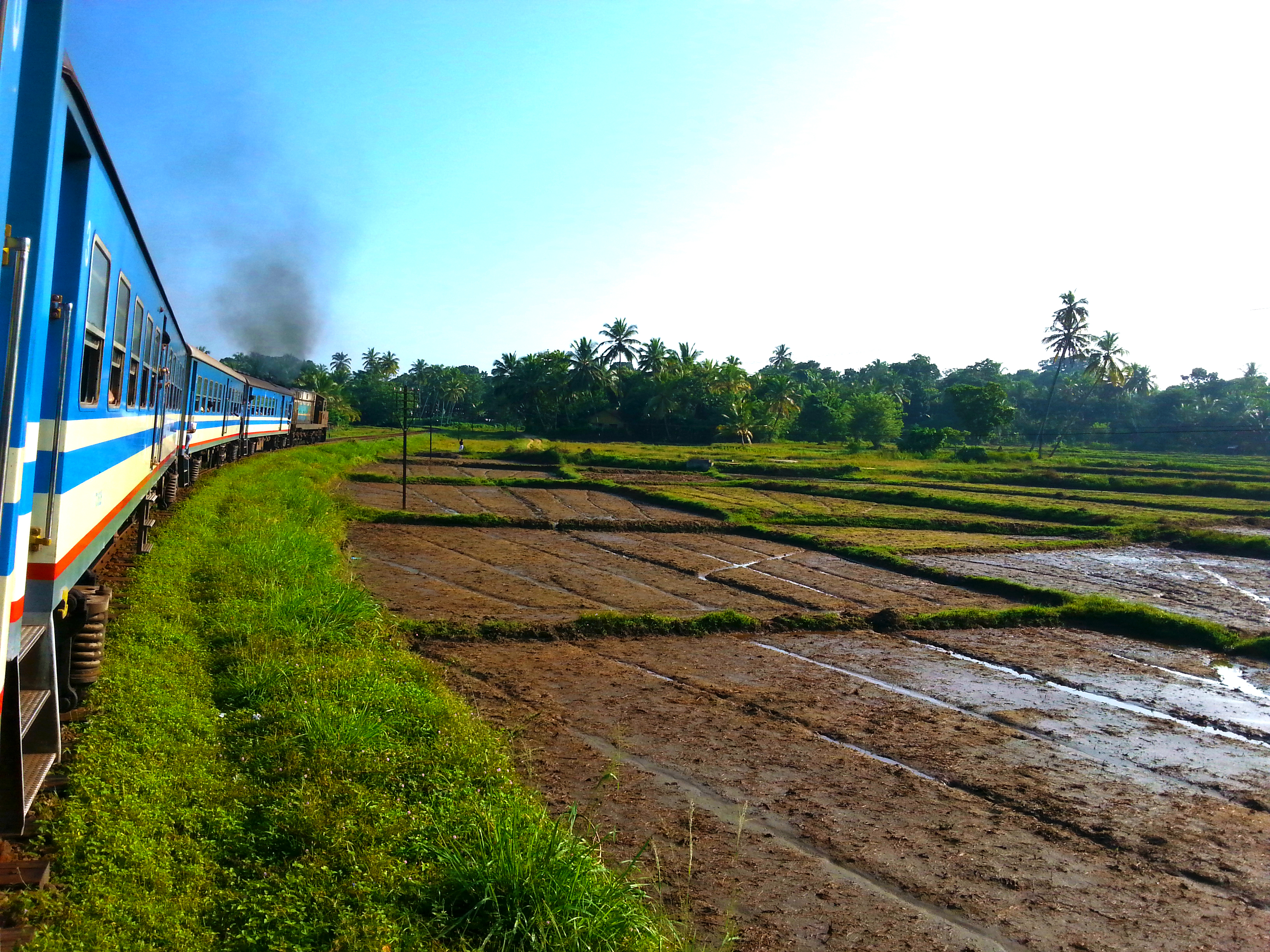
Udaya Devi passing through paddy fields, near Pothuhera

=== Route ===
The Udaya Devi runs on the Main line from Colombo Fort to Polgahawela Junction, from there, it turns to the Northern line and then does switchback from Maho Junction, it then runs the entire Batticaloa line.

=== Stops ===
There are 34 stops when going to Colombo, While there is 35 stops going to Batticaloa.

The Udaya Devi makes a longer stop at Maho Junction, with an average of 20 minutes, passengers can use this opportunity to use the facilities at the station or to purchase snacks and beverages. This is greater compared to other stations which have an average stop time of 2 to 5 minutes. This extended stop is necessary for the recoupling of the engine, which moves from the front of the train to the back. Following this, the train reverses direction and continues its journey all the way to Colombo or Batticaloa.

Udaya Devi also makes also makes an extended stop at Galoya Junction as well, this is due to the fact that some passengers can get the connecting train from Galoya Junction to Trincomalee.

It also makes another extended stop at Kalawewa and Habarana to let the incoming/outbound train pass to Colombo or Batticaloa.

== Rolling Stock ==
=== Current rolling stock and facilities ===
Udaya Devi previously operated using the M4 locomotive and chinese built compartments, due to breaking issues of the compartments, they were withdrawn from use on this line and was instead replaced with Romanian built coaches.

The refurbished compartments consist of a 2-2 seating layout in second class, while a 3-3 seating layout can be observed in third class, Second class has more padded seats with a great recline while third class has seats which are upright and do not recline at all.

Each coach on the train has a single restroom, equipped with a sink and a toilet.

The Udaya Devi typically consists of eight coaches: two guard coaches with cargo holds and six passenger coaches. While buffet cars are rare, when present, they are usually positioned in the middle of the formation, with the order being passenger, passenger, buffet, passenger, passenger.

During the late 2010s, the Sri lanka Railways in associating with Tantri began a programme to refurbish old and outdated locomotives, sets and coaches, this has seen success as the Udaya devi now operates with newer Tantri-built and refurbished coaches.

The service also switched from the M4 to the M2 and the M6, with the class M2 being commonly used compared to the M6.

On rare occasions, the class M4 is also used.

=== ICF coach trial ===
On August 13th of 2022, a trial was conducted to use Indian-built ICF coaches using the Class M4 locomotive of Sri lanka Railways. The trial was unsuccessful due to the increased weight of the newly built ICF coaches coupled with the lack of power that the M4 possed while hauling the coaches, which included slow acceleration and a longer time to break and as well as the unstable condition of the track, it was ultimately decided to not use ICF coaches, (excluding the S13 DMU-SETS which currently operate on the Batticaloa line as the Pulathisi Express). However this has not been ruled out and there are rumors of future plans of ICF coaches being deployed to Batticaloa.

However, the Northern line continues to use ICF coaches and S13 and S12 sets due to the upgraded track, which allows for a smoother ride and higher speed compared
