= Uttara Devi =

Uttara Devi උත්තර දේවි உத்தர தேவி
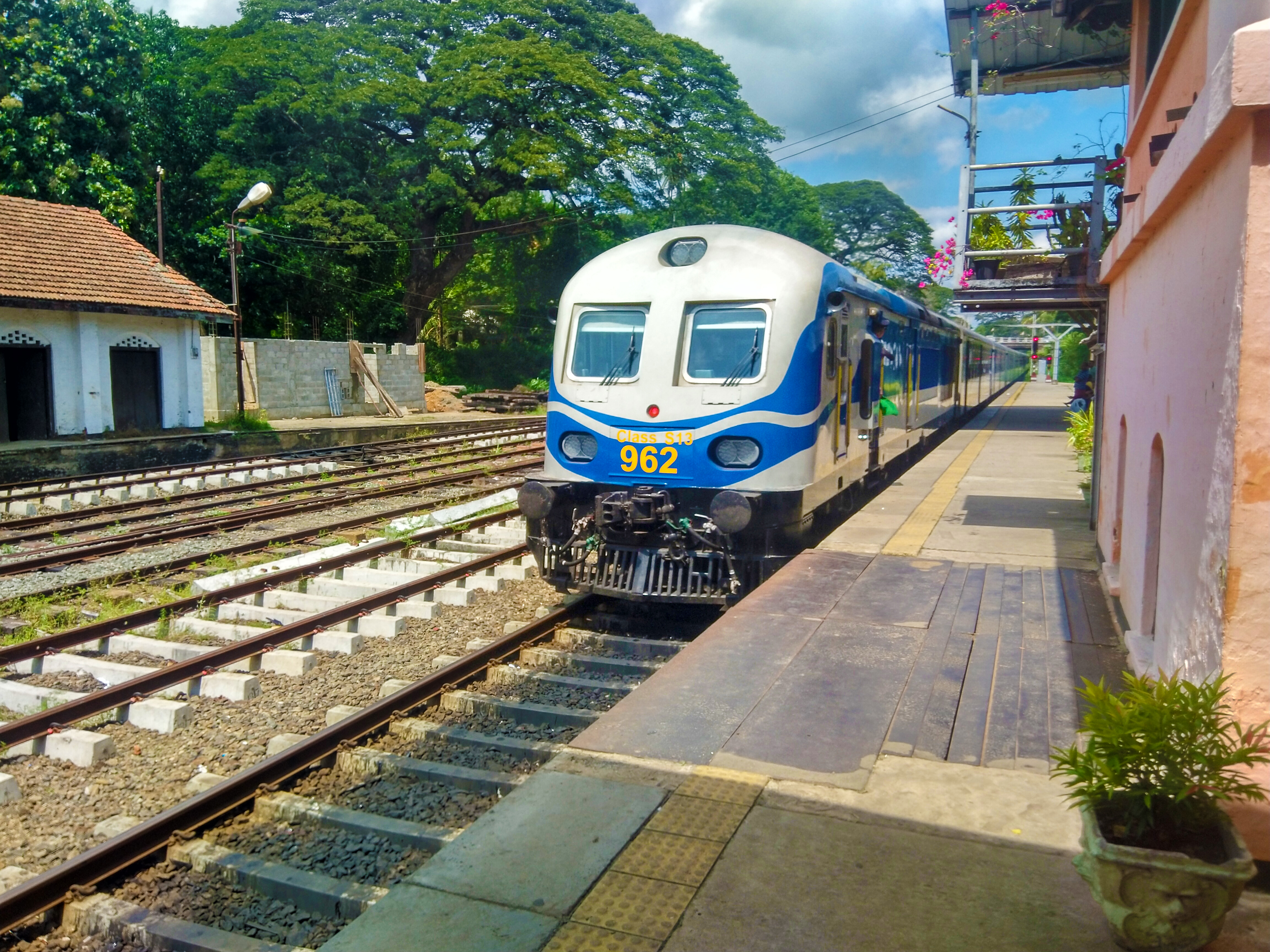
- Uttara Devi intercity express train at Kurunegala railway station, hauled by a S13 DMU

Overview
- Service type: Intercity Express Train
- Status: In service
- Locale: Sri Lanka
- Predecessor: Not in service
- Current operator: Sri Lanka Railways

Route
- Termini: Colombo Fort; Kankesanturai
- Distance travelled: 410 km
- Average journey time: 7 Hours
- Service frequency: Daily
- Train numbers: 4017 (Colombo Fort-Kankesanthurai); 4018 (Kankesanthurai-Colombo Fort)

Technical
- Track gauge: 5 ft 6 in (1,676 mm)

Uttara Devi (Sinhala: උත්තර දේවී, Princess/Queen of the North Tamil: உத்தர தேவி) is an Intercity Express train that runs between Colombo, the nation's commercial hub, with the northern cities of Jaffna and Kankesanturai.

== History ==
The Uttara Devi train was introduced as Deyata Kirula on 11 September 2011. Then its name was changed to Uttara Devi in mid-2015.

== Services ==
The Uttara Devi offers three classes of travel.

- 1st class offers Air conditioning and charging facilities.
- 2nd class.
- 3rd class typically gets very crowded and carries only basic facilities.

== Route ==
The train begins its northbound journey at Colombo Fort. It stops only at Gampaha, then reaches Polgahawela, the train branches off the Main Line, moving towards Kankesanturai, following Northern Line. It passes Kurunegala, the capital of North Western Province, and Maho, before continuing to the historic cultural and religious center of Anuradhapura, the island's ancient capital around the 4th century BCE and home to many sites of religious and archaeological interest. The train continues towards Jaffna, passing Vavuniya, Kilinochchi, Palai and Kodikamamam. Jaffna is the main cultural centre of the north of Sri Lanka. From here, the Northern Line extended to Kankesanturai, a port city. From Jaffna to Kankesanturai, Uttara Devi stops at every station.

== Rolling Stock ==
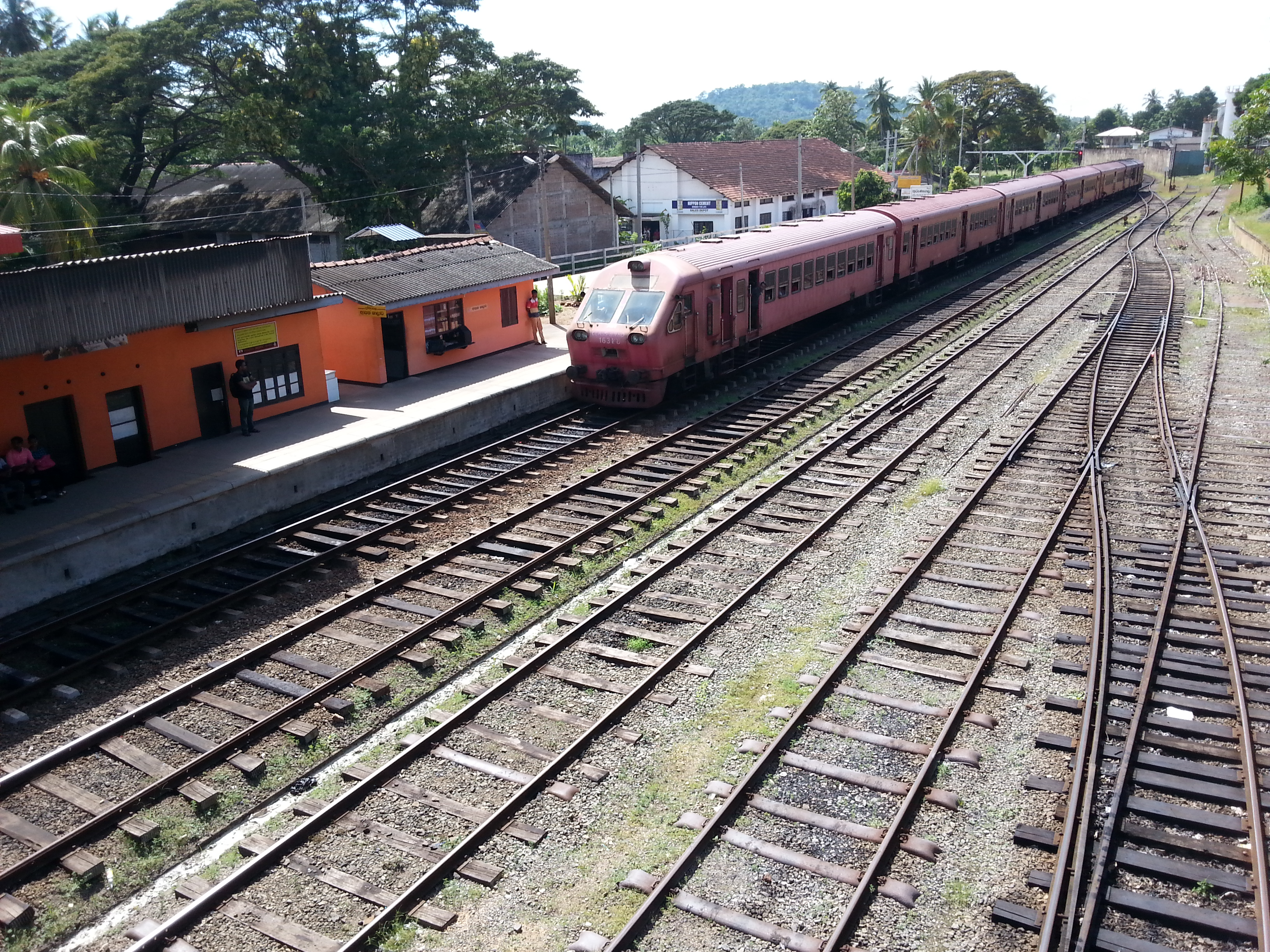
Uttara Devi Train at Kurunegala Railway Station, when it was operated by a S11 DMU, in 2017

The service was run by the S11 DMU, but was replaced by the new S13 sets in January 2019.

== See also ==
- Sri Lanka Railways
- List of named passenger trains of Sri Lanka
