= Sri Lanka Railways S11 =

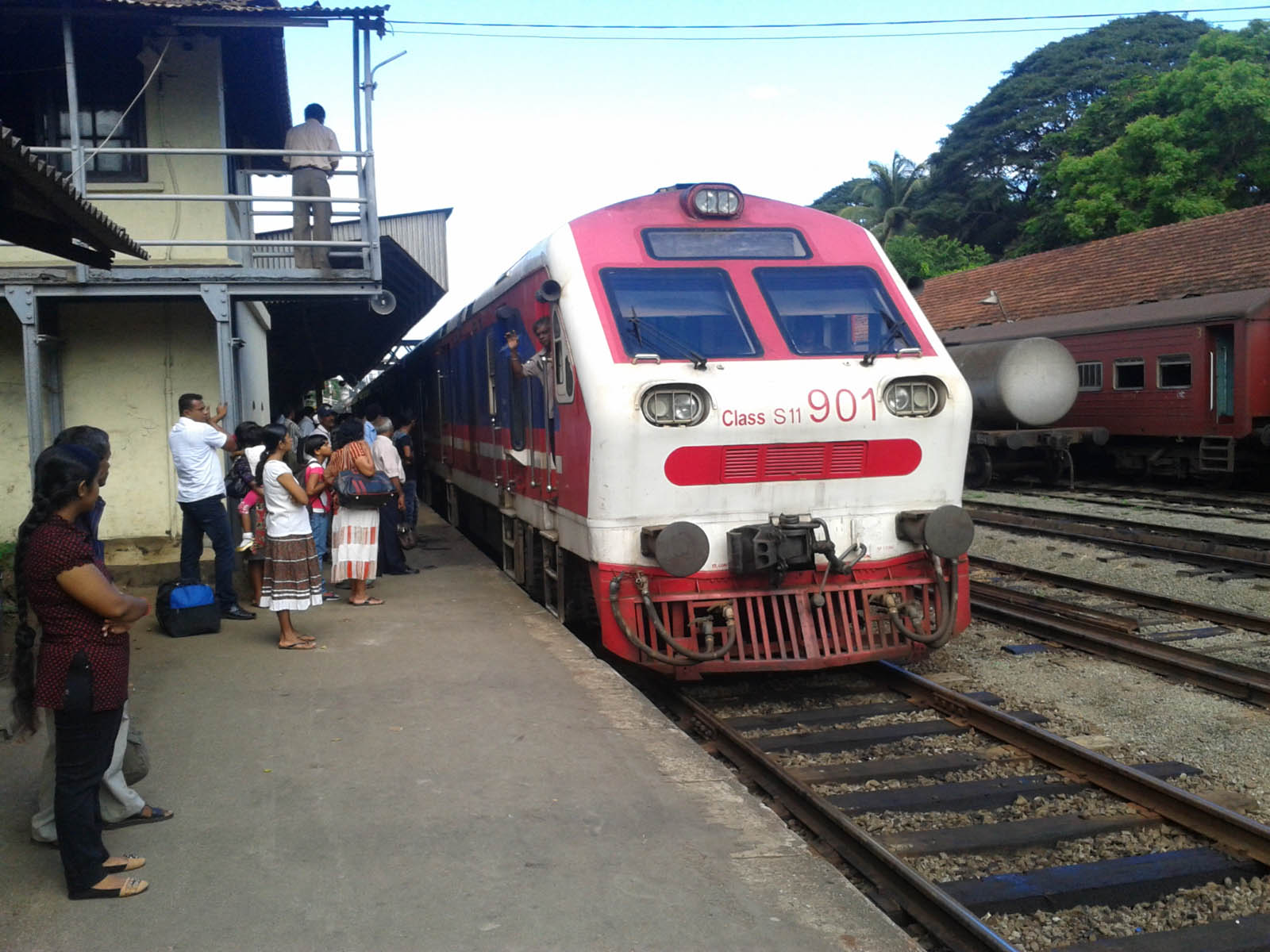
- S11 DEMU No. 901

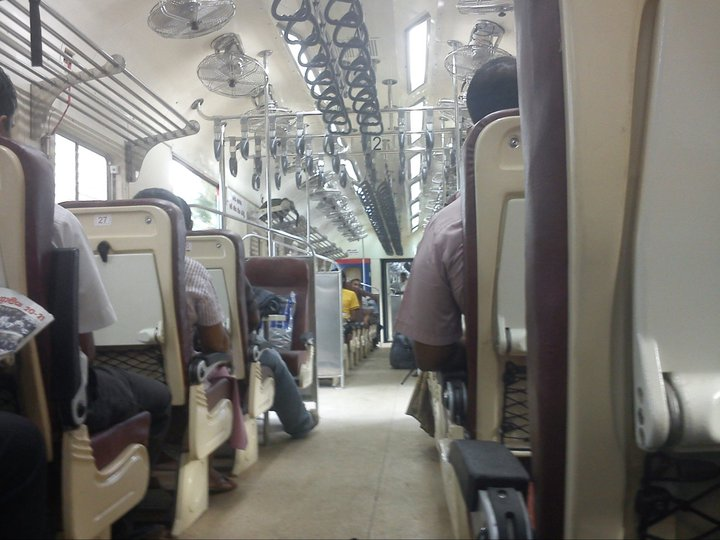
- Second Class Cabin
- Stock type: Diesel Multiple Unit
- In service: Since March 2011
- Manufacturer: Integral Coach Factory
- Designer: BHEL
- Assembly: Chennai, India
- Constructed: 2011—2012
- Number built: 20
- Formation: DPC + 3 TC + SC + DTC
- Capacity: 429
- Operator: Sri Lanka Railways

Specifications
- Car body construction: Fibre Reinforced Polymer (FRP) & Stainless steel
- Car length: DPC & DTC - 21,462 mm (70 ft 5 in)
- Doors: 2 pairs of Hinged Doors on both ends 1 pair 2-leaf manual sliding doors in the middle
- Maximum speed: 100 km/h (62 mph)
- Weight: 100 t (98 long tons; 110 short tons) (20 t (20 long tons; 22 short tons) for DPC, 16 t (16 long tons; 18 short tons) for TCs & DTC)
- Prime mover: Cummins KTA 50L
- Engine type: V16 4 stroke diesel, turbocharged
- Power output: 1,360 hp (1,010 kW)
- Transmission: Diesel-electric AC/DC
- AAR wheel arrangement: Bo-Bo
- Bogies: ICF Bogies
- Braking system: Air
- Coupling system: Schaku Semi Permanent Couplers between wagons & Automatic couplers (dual) on both ends
- Track gauge: 5 ft 6 in (1,676 mm)

Sri Lanka Railways S11 is a class of Diesel-electric multiple unit (DEMU) train set built for Sri Lanka Railways by Integral Coach Factory, India and imported through RITES Ltd, an Indian state infrastructure corporation on a line of credit extended by the Indian Government. They were built to replace locomotive-hauled passenger trains. Twenty S11 DEMUs were ordered to strengthen long-distance travel on the Coastal Line from Colombo to Matara.

== History ==
=== Conception ===
The railway decided to add the DMUs to its service as part of its Coastal line's upgrade project, where track was upgraded to improve speed. The DMUs were built by Integral Coach Factory, to replace locomotive-hauled passenger trains.

=== Inauguration into service ===
The trains were inaugurated into the railway service on 11 March 2011 with a ceremony at Matara Railway Station. According to a press release from the Indian High Commission in Sri Lanka, twenty DEMUs would be supplied to Sri Lanka Railways in phases till March 2012.

One of the DEMUs faced technical problems on the Galle–Matara section; during the journey, the train came to an abrupt halt due to an electrical short-circuit and resumed its journey after 20 minutes when the fault was set right. Sri Lanka Railways suspended further importation of the DEMUs. In April 2011, the suspension was revoked after a team from RITES inspected them and declared that the faults were due to an electrical failure caused by tinkering and the DEMU running with more coaches than it was designed for.

== Operations ==
The S11 DMUs are primarily operated on the Coastal line, connecting Colombo, Galle, and Matara. The sets are used on the Ruhunu Kumari, Vavniya ICE and several other suburban trains. Apart from the single instance of a 20-minute failure on the Galle – Matara section, there has been no other failure of the DMUs. Other than on Coastal Line, one DMU is running express on Puttalam Line where it only stops at Negombo and seven other stations up to Chilaw after Dematagoda.

== Current fleet specifications ==
Class	Operator	No. in service	Year built	Cars per Set	Unit numbers.
S11	Sri Lanka Railways	20	2011 - 2012	6	894-913

Formations
Formation	Number of Cars	Passenger capacity	Key
DPC + 3 TC + SC + DTC	6	429	DPC - Driving Power Coach (31 Third class seats); TC - Third class Coach (90 seats); SC - Second class Coach (72 seats); DTC - Driving Trailer Coach (56 Second class seats)

== Crashes & incidents ==
=== Alawwa Crash ===
- 2011 Alawwa rail accident – On 17 September 2011, near Alawwa, two trains (a locomotive-hauled train and an S11 DMU No. 899) collided, killing 3 people and injuring 20. The S11 ran into the rear observation car of the train ahead.

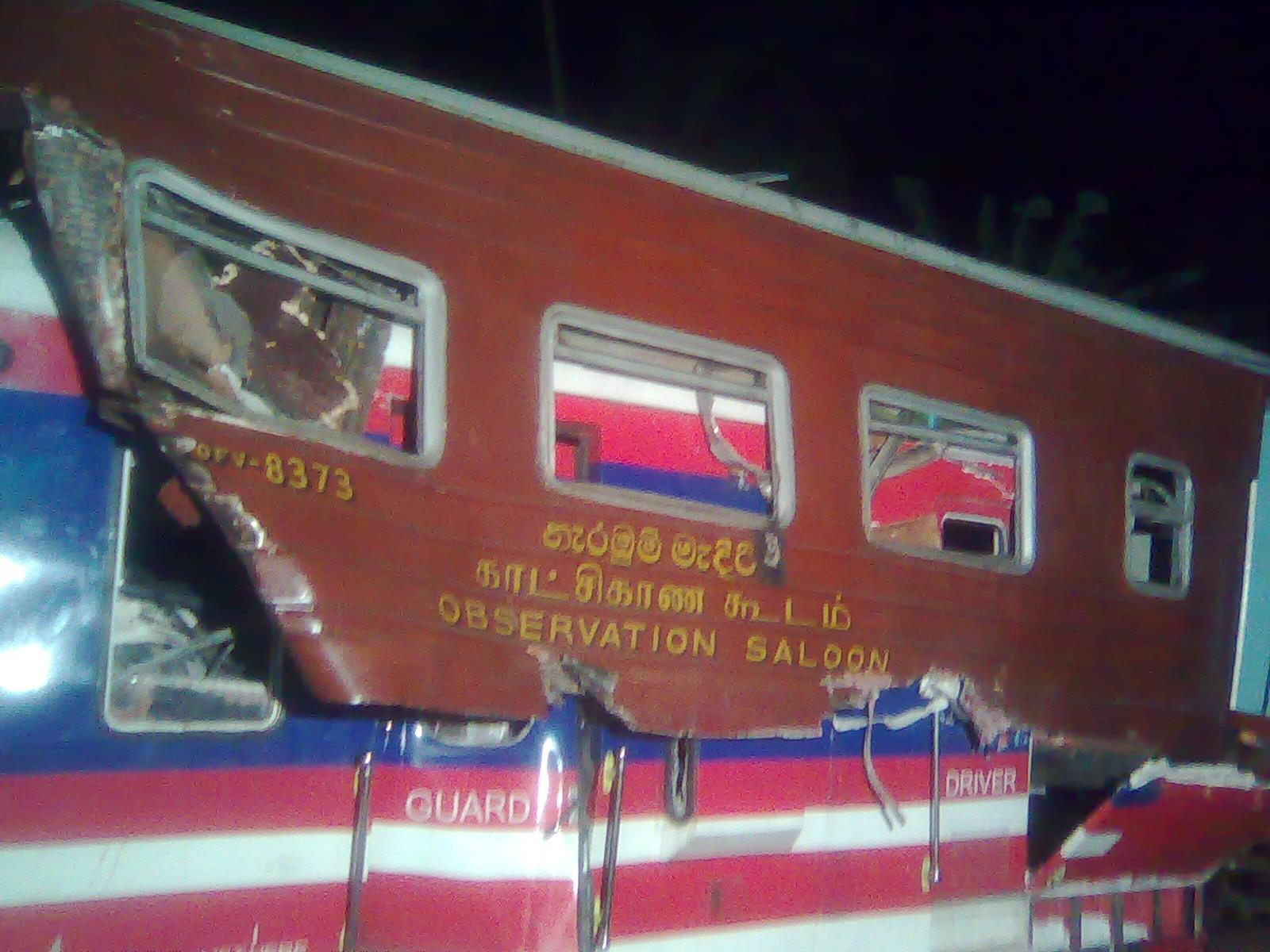
Alawwa Train Accident

=== Pothuhera Crash ===
On 31 May 2014 a north bound Deyata Kirula intercity express train hauled by S11 No. 902 and the Colombo bound Rajarata Rejini train hauled by Class M2 - 570 collided together in the Pothuhera railway station near Kurunegala injuring 68 people and causing serious damages to the both trains and the track. This has been considered as the most damage valued accident for Sri Lanka Railways.

== Gallery ==
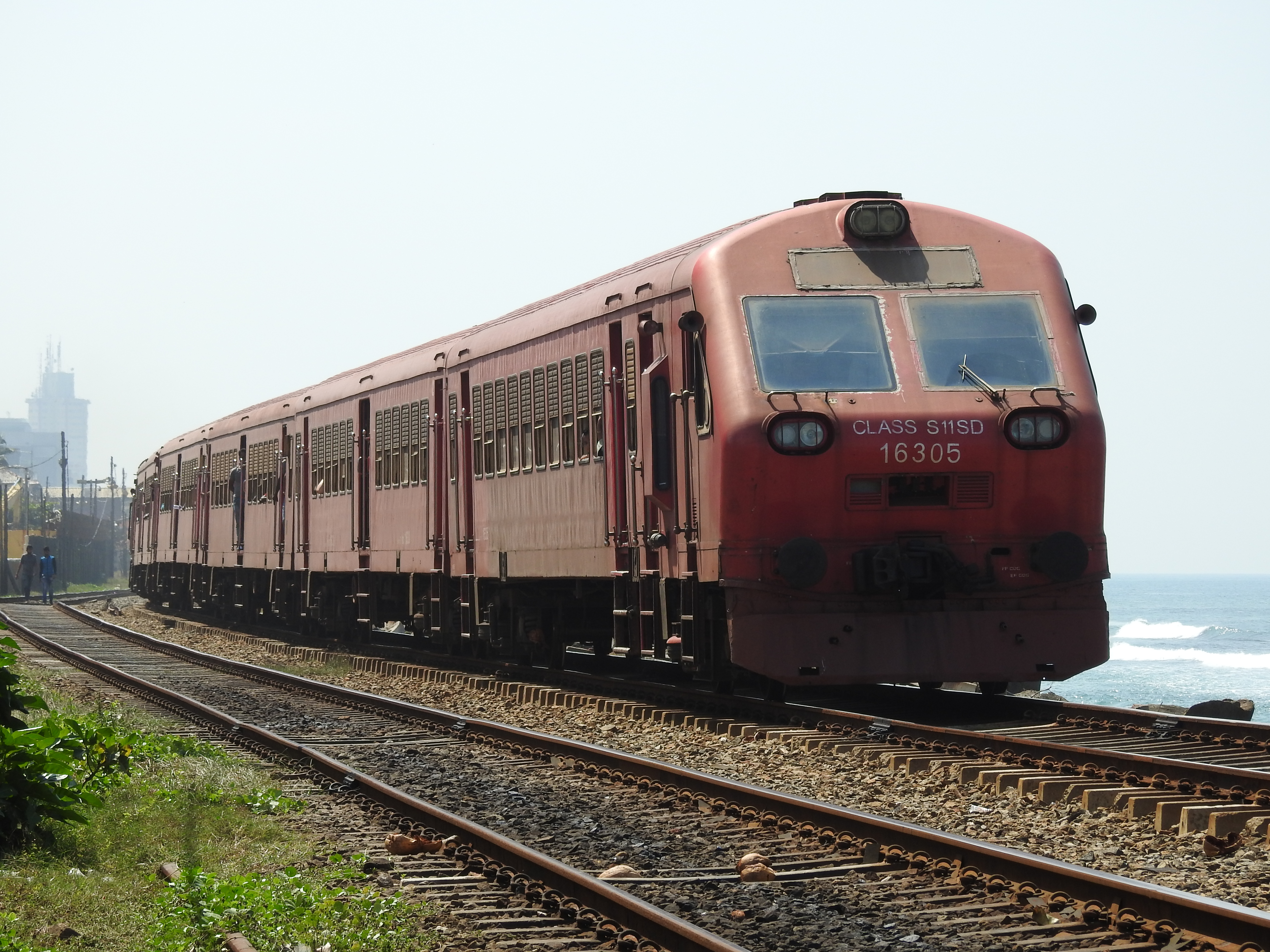

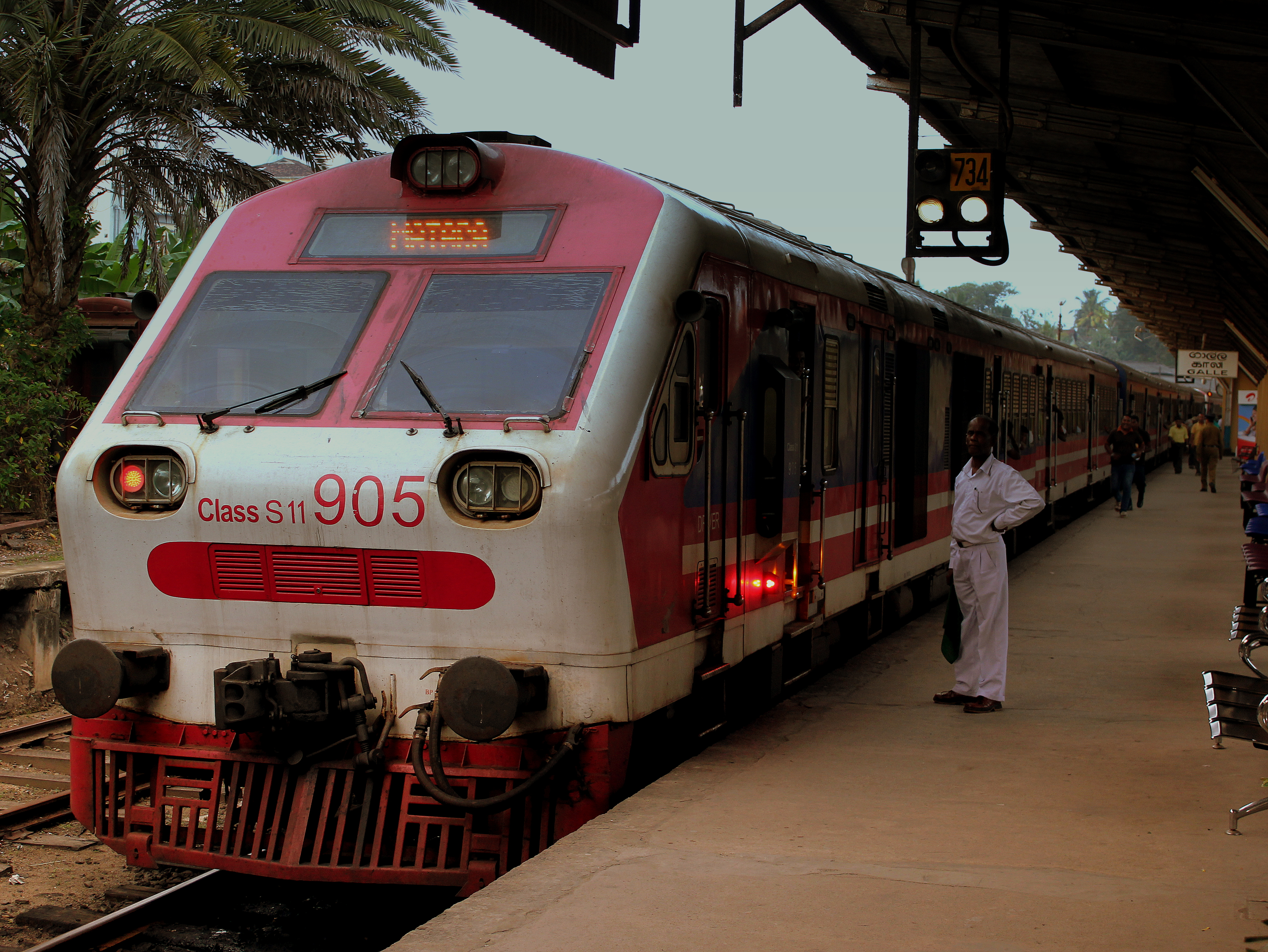
S11 No. 900

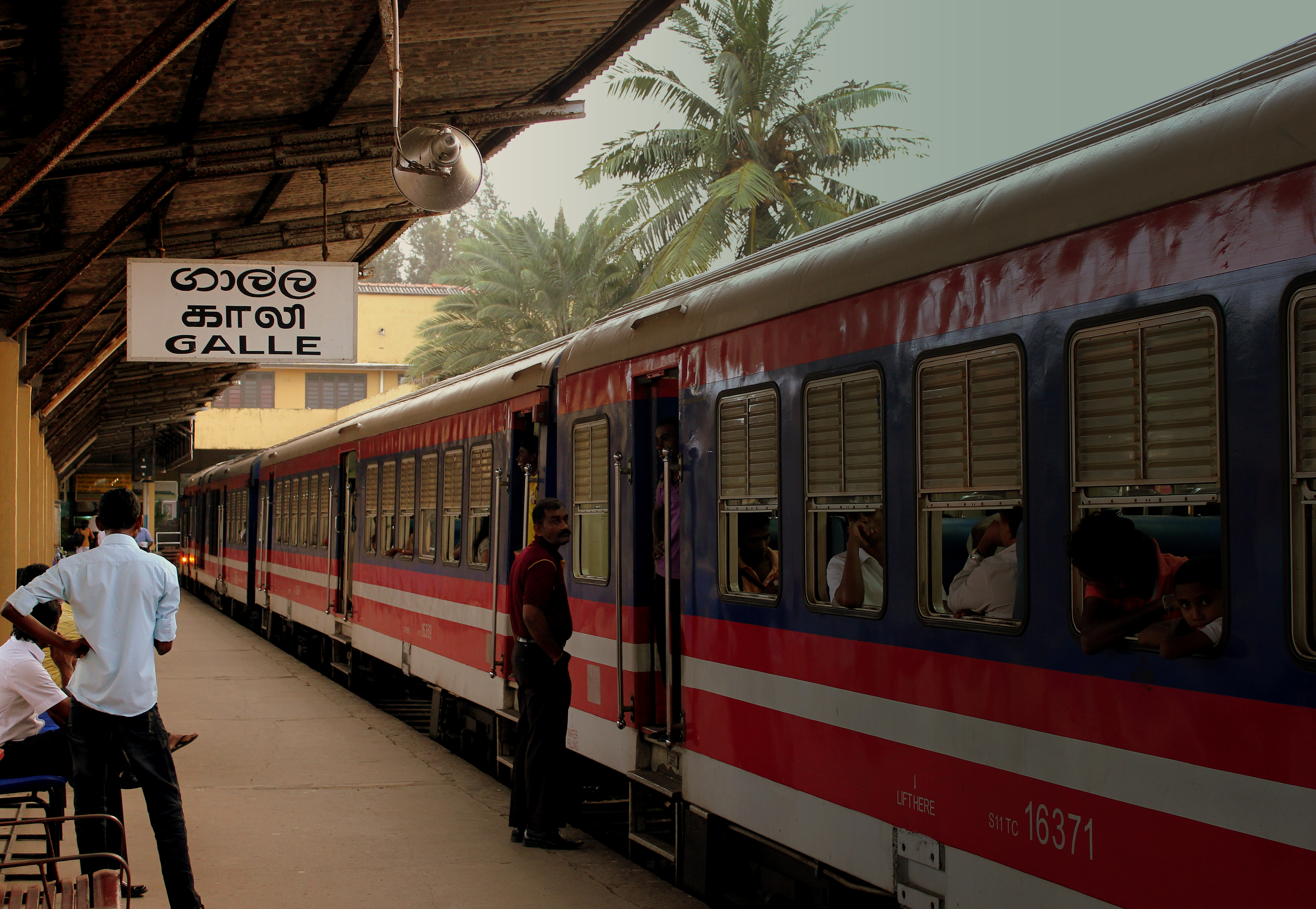

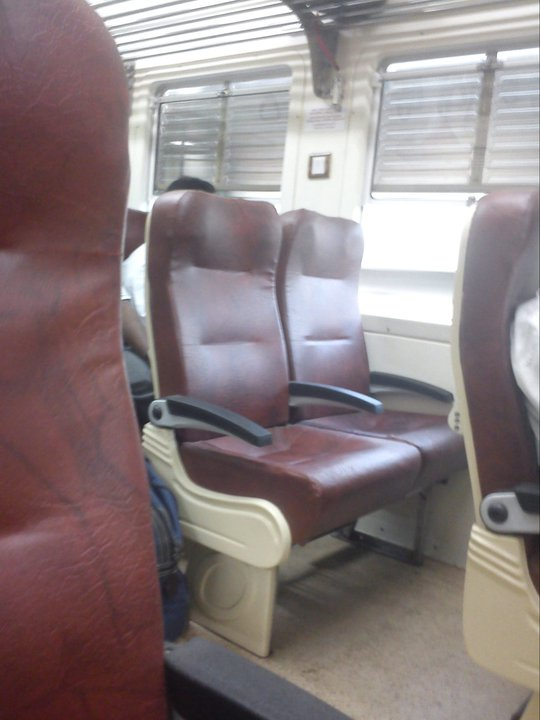
Second class seats

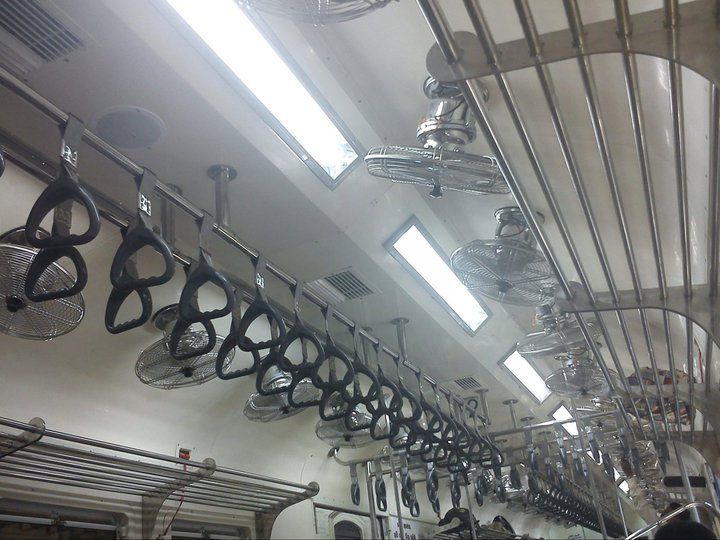
Interior ceiling and baggage racks

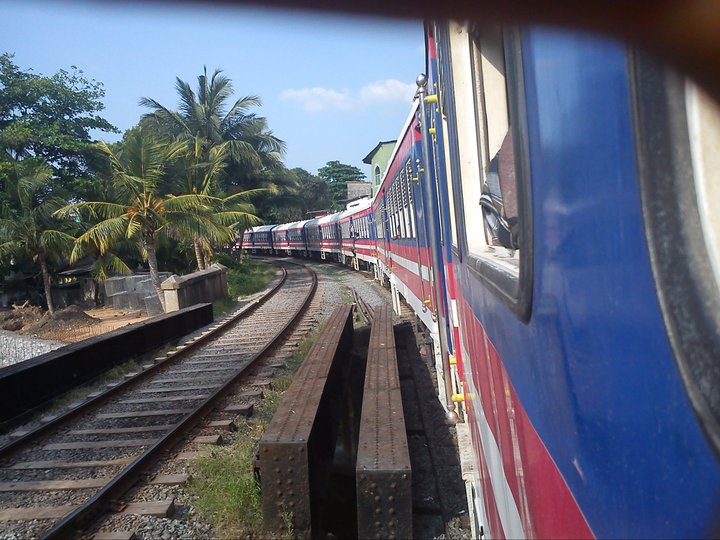

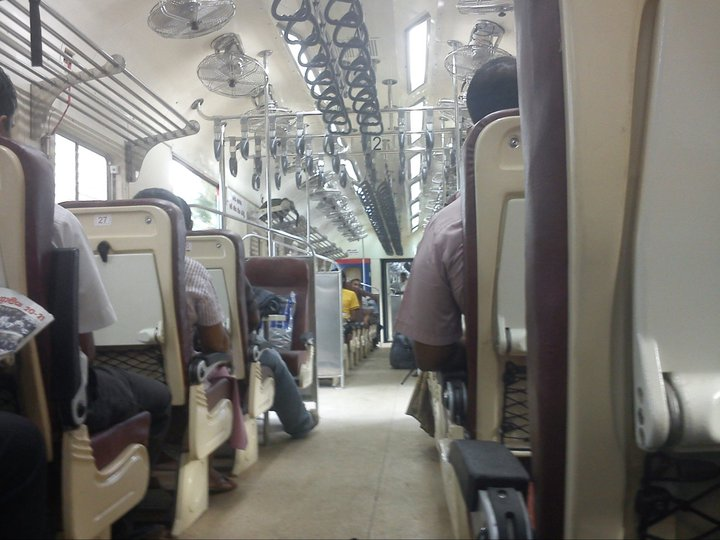

== See also ==
- Sri Lanka Railways
- Sri Lanka Railways S13
