= Eravur railway station =

Railway station in Sri Lanka

Eravur railway station ஏறாவூர் එරාවූර් දුම්රිය ස්ථානය

General information
- Location: Eravur; Sri Lanka
- Coordinates: 7°47′08.20″N 81°36′15.90″E
- System: Sri Lankan Railway Station
- Owner: Sri Lanka Railways
- Line: Batticaloa line

Other information
- Status: Functioning
Location

Eravur railway station is a railway station in the town of Eravur in eastern Sri Lanka. Owned by Sri Lanka Railways, the state-owned railway operator, the station is part of the Batticaloa line which links Batticaloa District with the capital Colombo.

== Services ==
Preceding station	Sri Lanka Railways	Following station
Kalkudah	Batticaloa line	Batticaloa

== See also ==
- List of railway stations in Sri Lanka
- List of railway stations in Sri Lanka by line
