= Sri Lanka Railways M10 =

Class of M10 Sri Lanka diesel-electric locomotives

Class M10
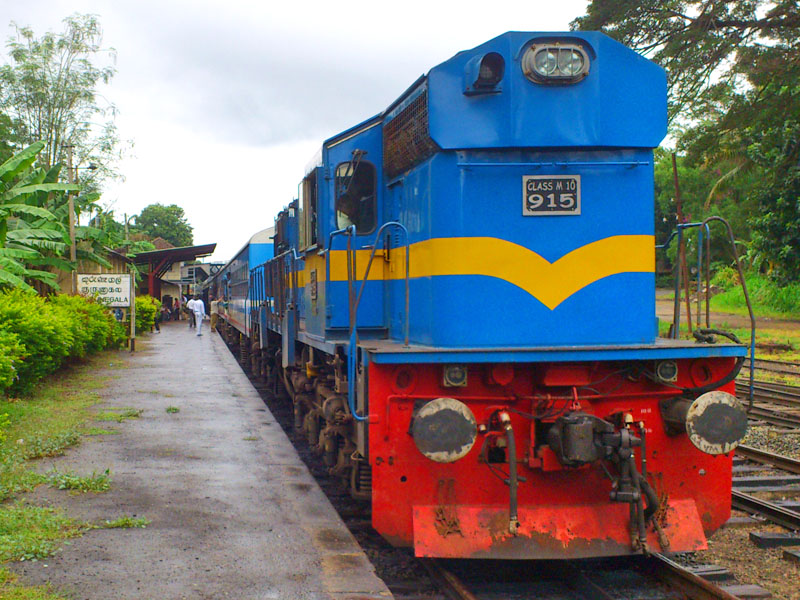
- Class M10 No.915 locomotive With Yal Devi train at Kurunegala railway station.
Type and origin
- Power type: Diesel Electric
- Builder: Banaras Locomotive Works, India
- Model: WDM3D
- Total produced: M10 - 3, M10A - 6
Specifications
- Configuration
  - AAR: C-C
  - UIC: Co'Co'
- Gauge: 5 ft 6 in (1,676 mm)
- Bogies: 2
- Wheel diameter: 1,092 mm (3 ft 7 in)
- Length: 18,650 mm (61 ft 2 1/4 in)
- Width: 2,950 mm (9 ft 8 1/8 in)
- Height: 4,077 mm (13 ft 4 1/2 in)
- Axle load: 19.5 Tons
- Loco weight: 117 Tons
- Fuel type: diesel
- Fuel capacity: 5,000 L (1,100 imp gal; 1,300 US gal)
- Prime mover: ALCO 251 B-16
- Engine type: 4 Stroke V12 diesel
- Alternator: BHEL TA 10102FV
- Cylinders: 12
- Transmission: Electric AC/DC
- MU working: Yes
- Loco brake: Air, Dynamic
- Train brakes: Air, Vacuum
Performance figures
- Maximum speed: 120 km/h (75 mph)
- Power output: 2,300 hp (1,700 kW)
- Brakeforce: IRAB-1 System
Career
- Class: Class M10
- Number in class: M10 - 3, M10A - 6
- Locale: Sri Lanka
- Delivered: 8 March 2012
- First run: 2012
- Current owner: Sri Lanka Railways
- Disposition: Active

Class M10 is a mainline diesel-electric locomotive built by Banaras Locomotive Works, India, which is the largest diesel-electric locomotive manufacturer in India, for Sri Lanka Railways and constructed in 2012. M10 is similar in appearance to DLW WDM3D but specifications are somewhat different. This is one of the longest locomotive types in Sri Lanka. These Locomotives are for the Sri Lanka Railways as part of the ongoing Northern Railway reconstruction project.

== History ==
Class M10 locomotives were introduced in 2012 numbered 914, 915, 916. These were used mainly on freight and oil trains. They have also been used irregularly on passenger services. M10 locomotives were also used for ballast trains in the construction work of the rail lines to Talaimannar and Kankesanthurai.

== Class M10A ==
Another 6 locomotives were imported in 2012 were named under M10A class numbered 940 on wards. This is a technical variant of original M10 locomotive. On 20 September 2013, an M10A locomotive was successfully sent on trial to Kandy, the first time they were sent on the up country line.

== Usage ==
This class was used for construction work at the Talaimannar and Kankesanthurai lines. After extending the northern line to Jaffna and beyond, M10s were used for passenger services including Yal Devi on the northern line.

== Gallery ==
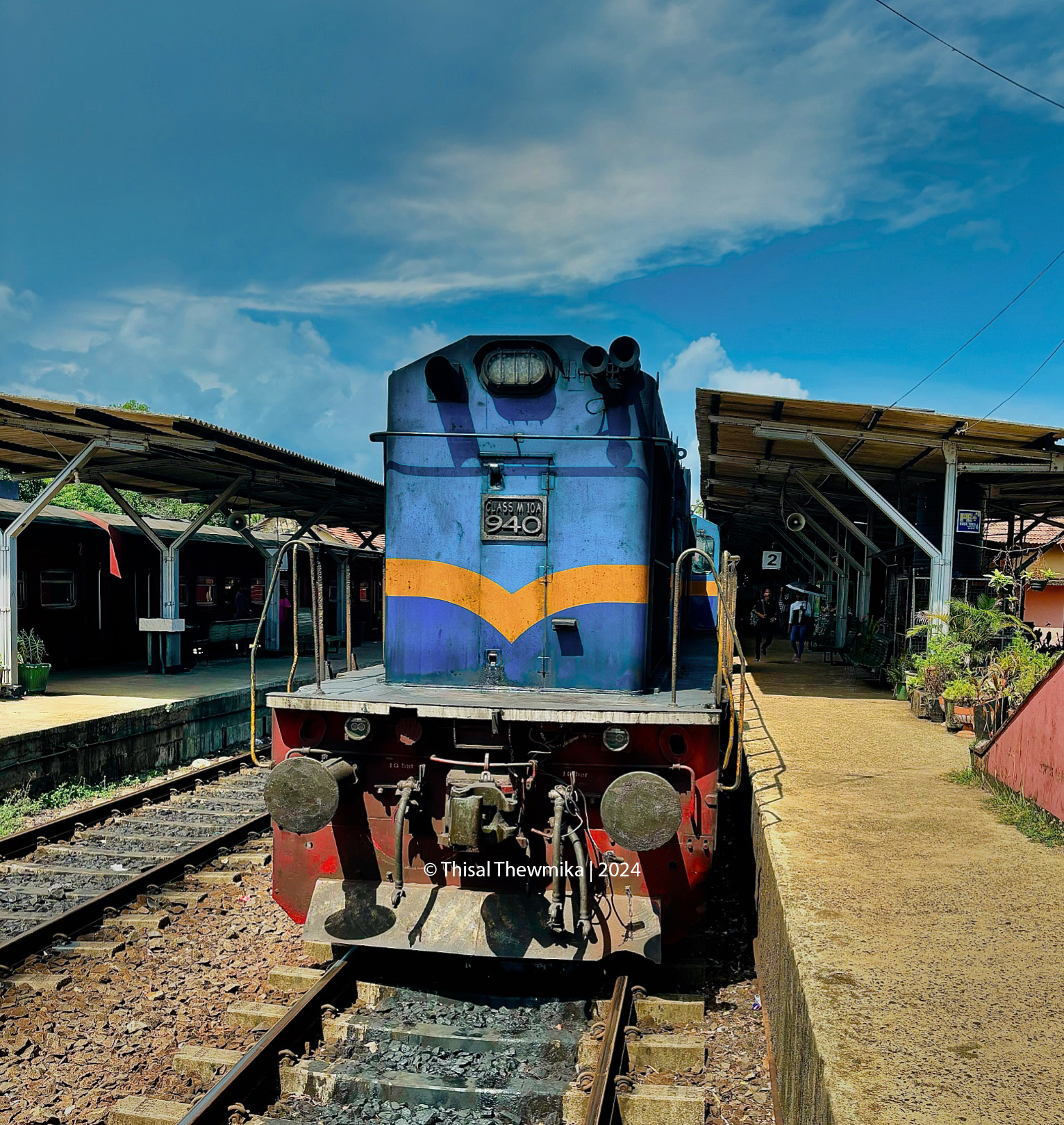
Class M10A 940 Locomative

== See also ==
- Diesel locomotives of Sri Lanka
