= Sri Lanka Railways S9 =

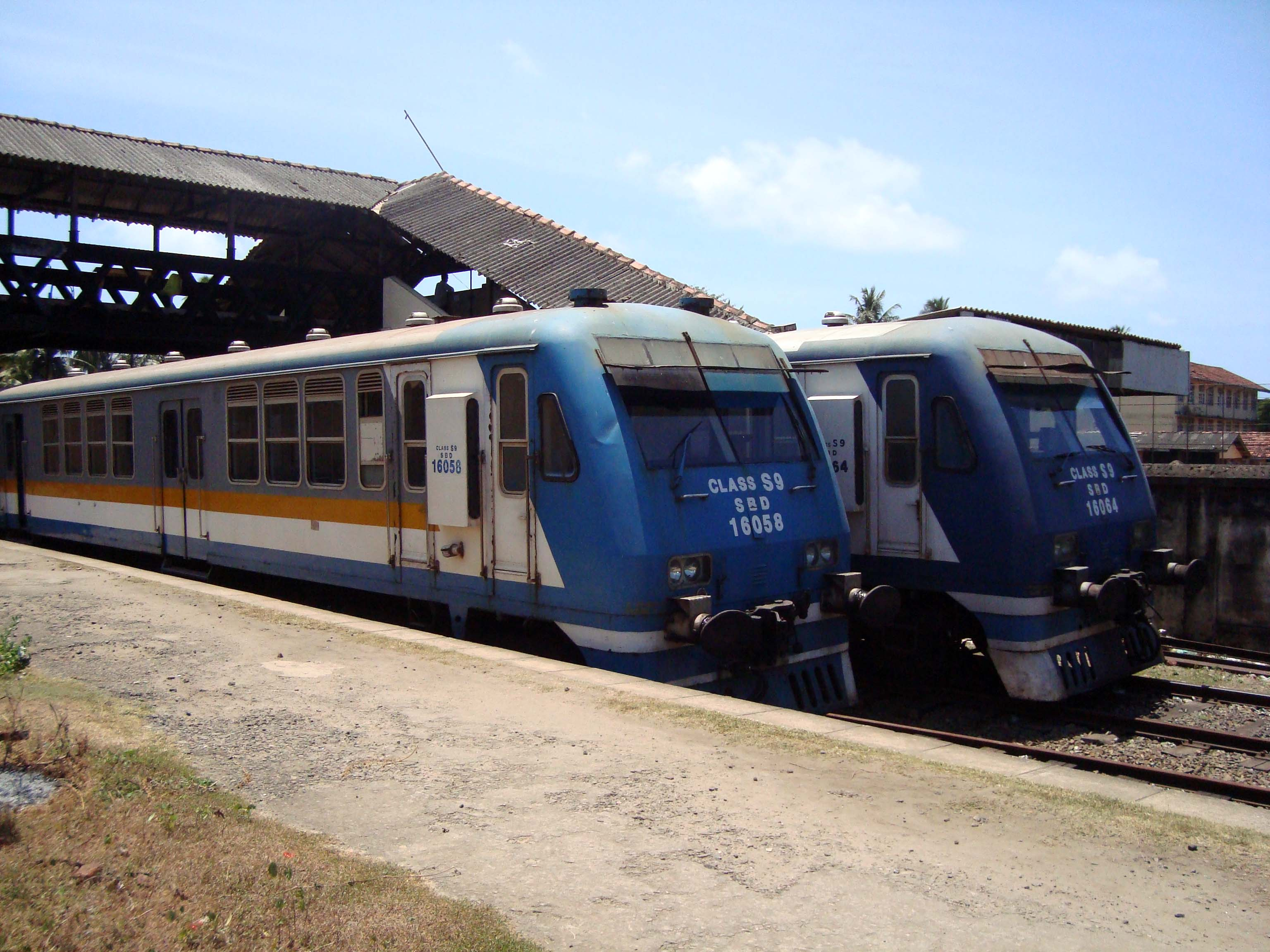
- Two S9 DMUs Parked At A Station
- Stock type: Diesel-Electric Multiple Unit
- Manufacturer: CRRC Qingdao Sifang; CSR Corporation Limited
- Constructed: 2000
- Entered service: 2000
- Number built: 15
- Formation: DPC + 4 TC + DTC
- Fleet numbers: 849-863
- Operators: Sri Lanka Railways
- Depots: Electrical Power Coaches Shed, Maradana

Specifications
- Car length: 19.81 m (64.99 ft)
- Maximum speed: 100 km/h (62 mph)
- Weight: 73 t (72 long tons; 80 short tons) Engine Compartment Only
- Prime mover(s): MTU 12V396TC14
- Engine type: V12
- Power output: 1,580 hp (1,180 kW)
- Transmission: Diesel-electric
- AAR wheel arrangement: B-B
- Braking system(s): compressed Air, Dynamic
- Coupling system: Automatic (dual)
- Multiple working: Yes
- Track gauge: 1,676 mm (5 ft 6 in)

Sri Lanka Railways S9 is a class of diesel-electric multiple unit (DEMU) train sets operated by Sri Lanka's state run rail operator, Sri Lanka Railways.

== History ==
The Class S9 DEMU was introduced to Sri Lanka in the year 2000. They were built by the China South Locomotive & Rolling Stock Corporation, and are the first class of Diesel-electric multiple units to run on Sri Lankan rails.

== Technical specifications ==
Class S9 DEMU Formation
Formation	Number of cars	Key
DPC + 4 TC + DTC	6	DPC - Driving Power Car; DTC - Driving Trailer Car; TC - Trailer Car

The Class S9 only has Third class accommodations as it is used exclusively for commuter services. The length of one car is 19.81 metres (65.0 ft).

== Operation ==
These DEMUs are operated on Sri Lanka's Main Line (up to Rambukkana), Coastal Line, Puttlam Line and Northern Line, but not on the Kelani Valley Line.

== Gallery ==
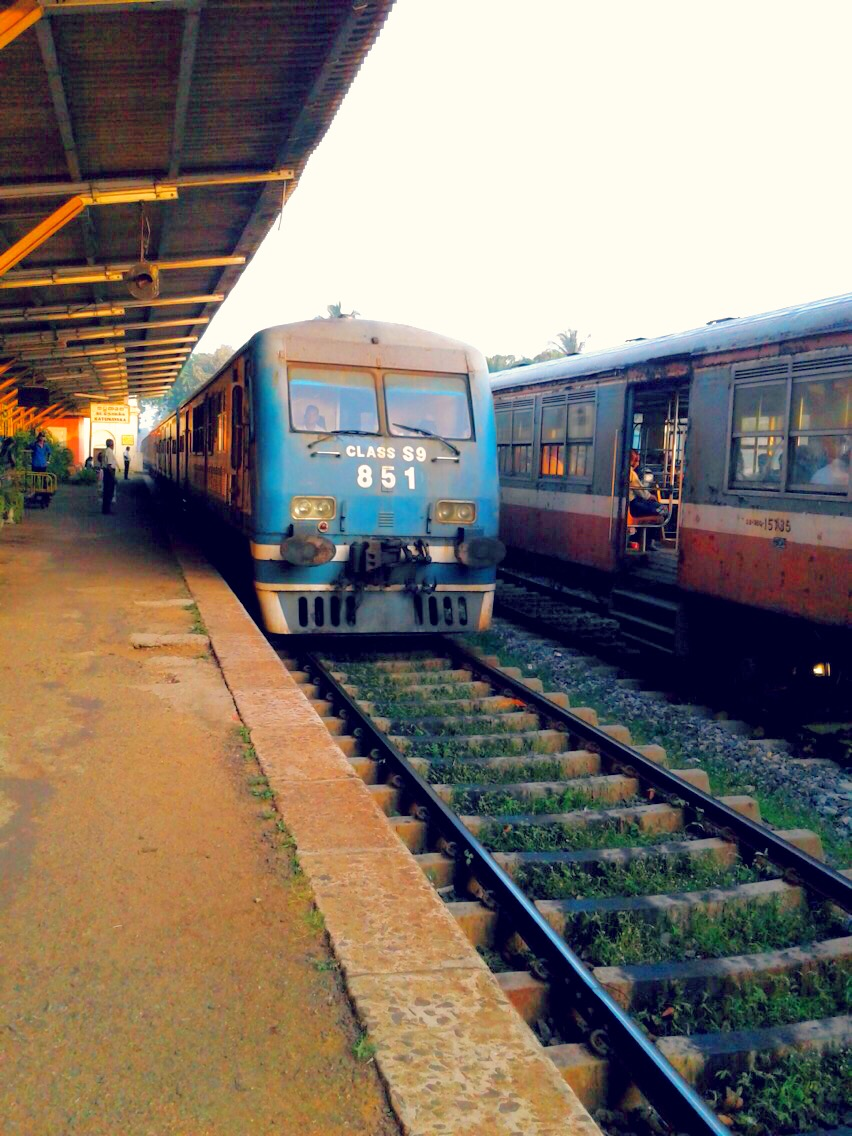
S9 at Katunayake railway station

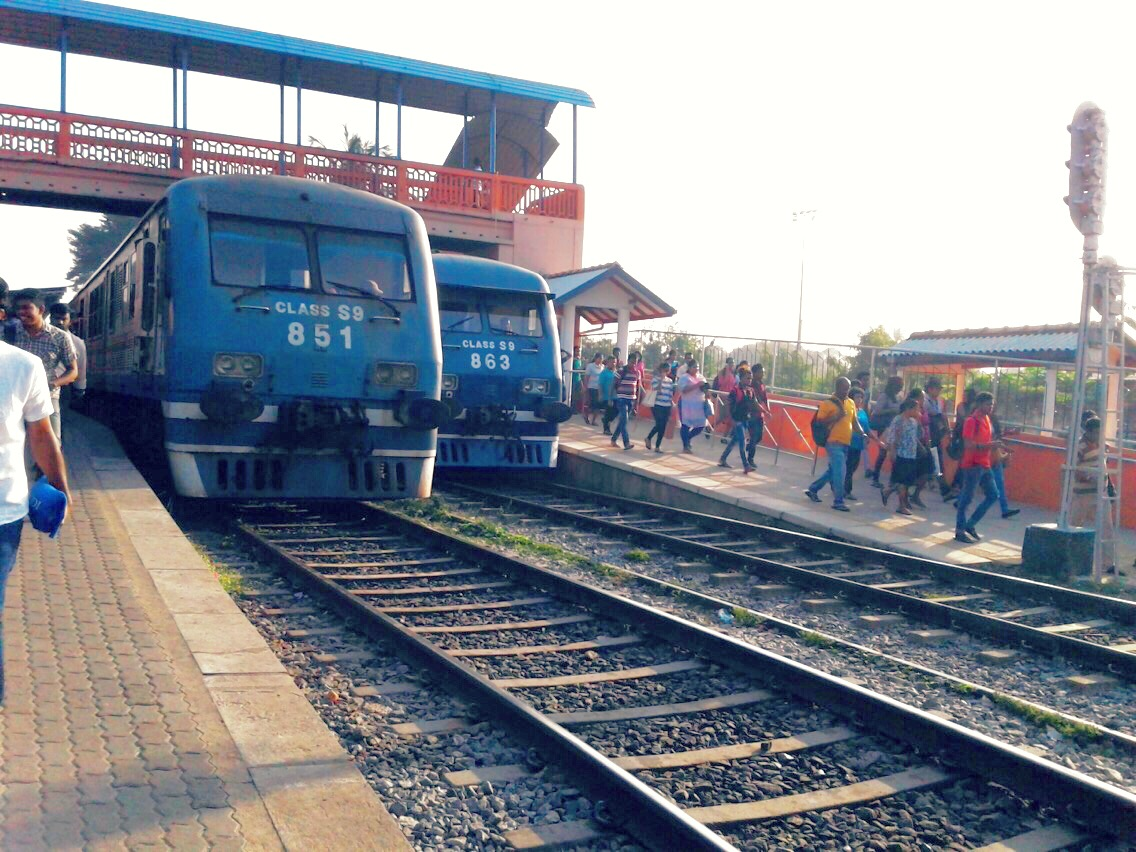
S9 at Dematagoda railway station

== See also ==
- Diesel locomotives of Sri Lanka
