= Sri Lanka Railways M4 =

Class of diesel-electric locomotive

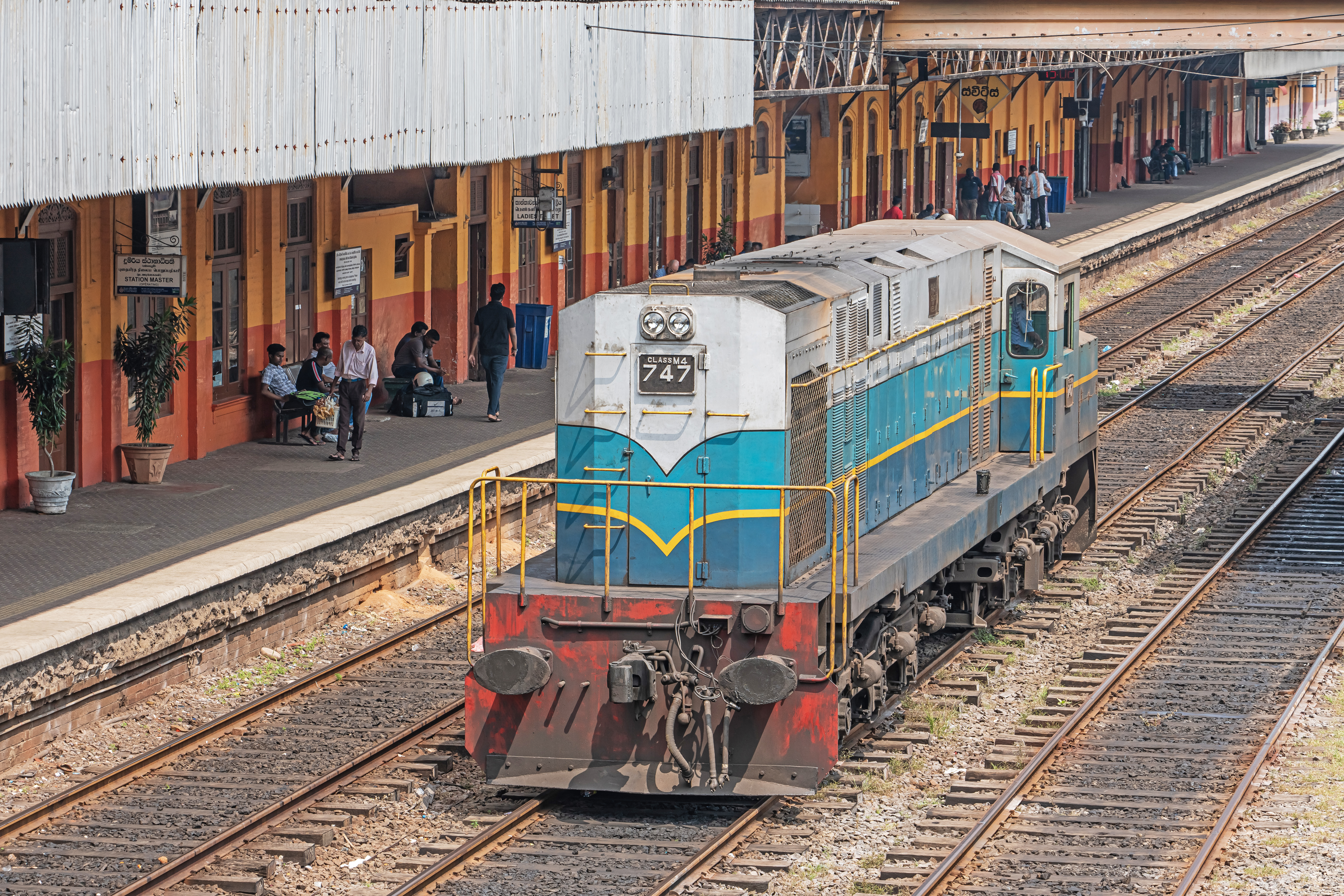
- Class M4 No. 747 "Kalani"
Type and origin
- Power type: Diesel-electric
- Builder: Montreal Locomotive Works
- Order number: M-6080
- Serial number: M-6080-01 to M-6080-14
- Model: MX-620
- Build date: 1975 onwards
- Total produced: 14
Specifications
- Configuration
  - UIC: Co′Co′
- Gauge: 5 ft 6 in (1,676 mm)
- Wheelbase: Bogie: 11 ft 2 in (3,404 mm)
- Length: 58 ft 3 in (17.75 m)
- Loco weight: 93 long tons (94 t; 104 short tons)
- Fuel type: Diesel
- Prime mover: ALCO 251C3
- Engine type: 4 stroke V12 diesel
- Cylinders: 12
- Loco brake: Air, Vacuum, Dynamic (Some vary)
Performance figures
- Maximum speed: Design: 104 km/h (65 mph); Service: 65 km/h (40 mph)
- Power output: 1,750 hp (1,300 kW)
Career
- Operators: Sri Lanka Railways
- Class: M4
- Number in class: 14
- Numbers: 743–756
- Official name: See table
- First run: 1975

The Sri Lanka Railways M4 is a class of diesel-electric locomotive manufactured in Canada by Montreal Locomotive Works. Fourteen of the manufacturers' model MX-620 were imported in 1975.

This was the longest locomotive in the Sri Lanka Railways previously. All units are still operational. On regular operation they are rarely used beyond Polgahawela on the main line (only with assistance from a dynamic brakes equipped locomotive on downhill), and are not used beyond Nawalapitiya. They used to travel on the full main line regularly until the previous decade.

They are painted in a livery of dark blue, light blue, silver with yellow striping; although No. 752 Point Pedro was painted in a special ICE (Intercity Express) livery.

== Fleet ==
Number	Name	Notes
743	Madhu	Air Brakes Added
744	Sigiri	Air Brakes Added
745	Ruwanweli	Air Brakes Added
746	Namunukula	Air Brakes Added
747	Kelani	Air Brakes Added
748	Walawe	Air Brakes Added
749	Dunhinda	Air Brakes Added
750	Isurumuni	Air Brakes Added
751	Diyaluma	Air Brakes Added
752	Point Pedro	Special ICE livery was on this locomotive. Now normal livery.
753	Samanala	Imported with Dyn Brakes. Air Brakes Added
754	Menik	Imported with Dyn Brakes. Air Brakes Added
755	Mahaweli	Imported with Dyn Brakes. Air Brakes Added
756	Laxapana	Imported with Dyn Brakes. Air Brakes Added

== Gallery ==
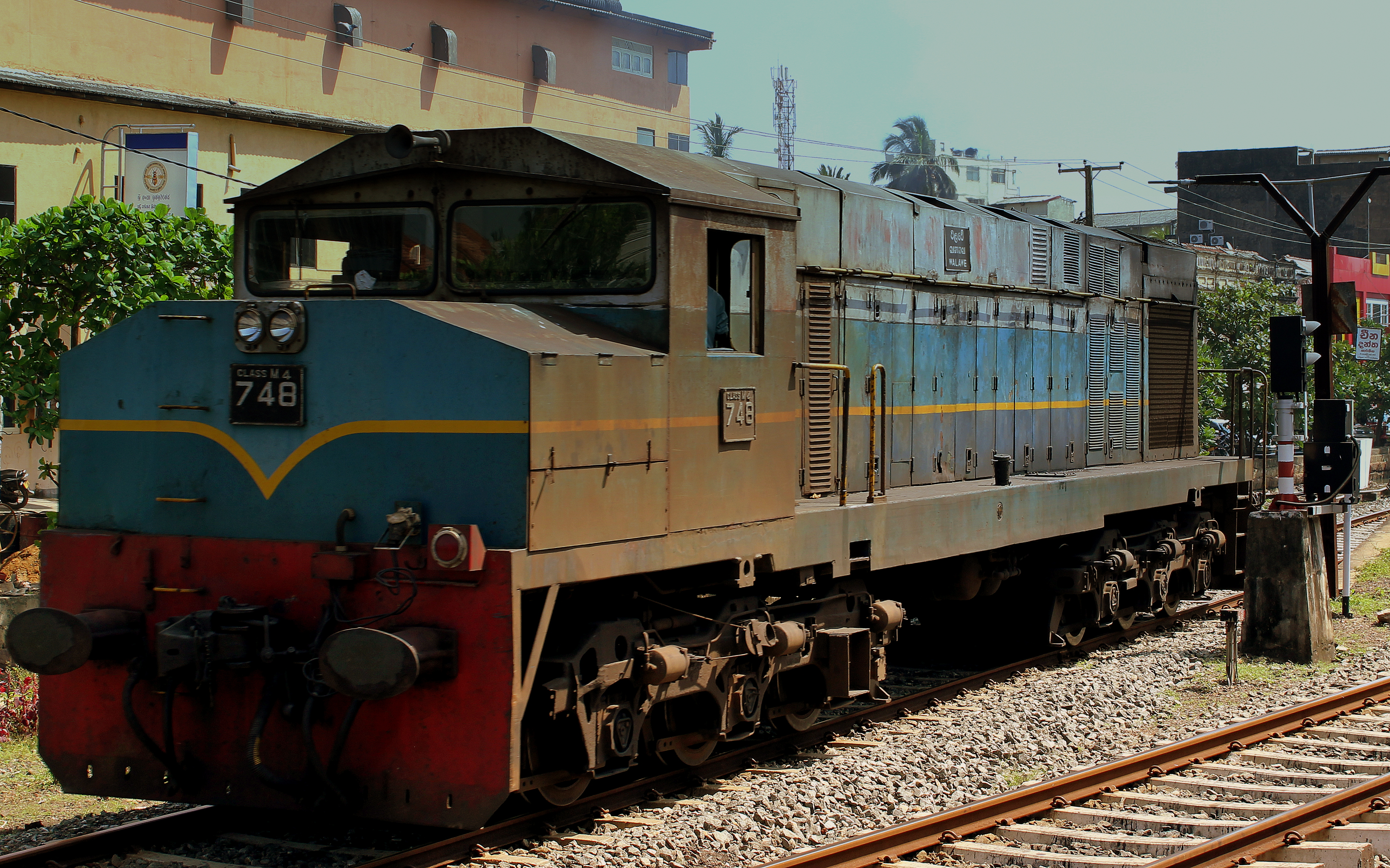

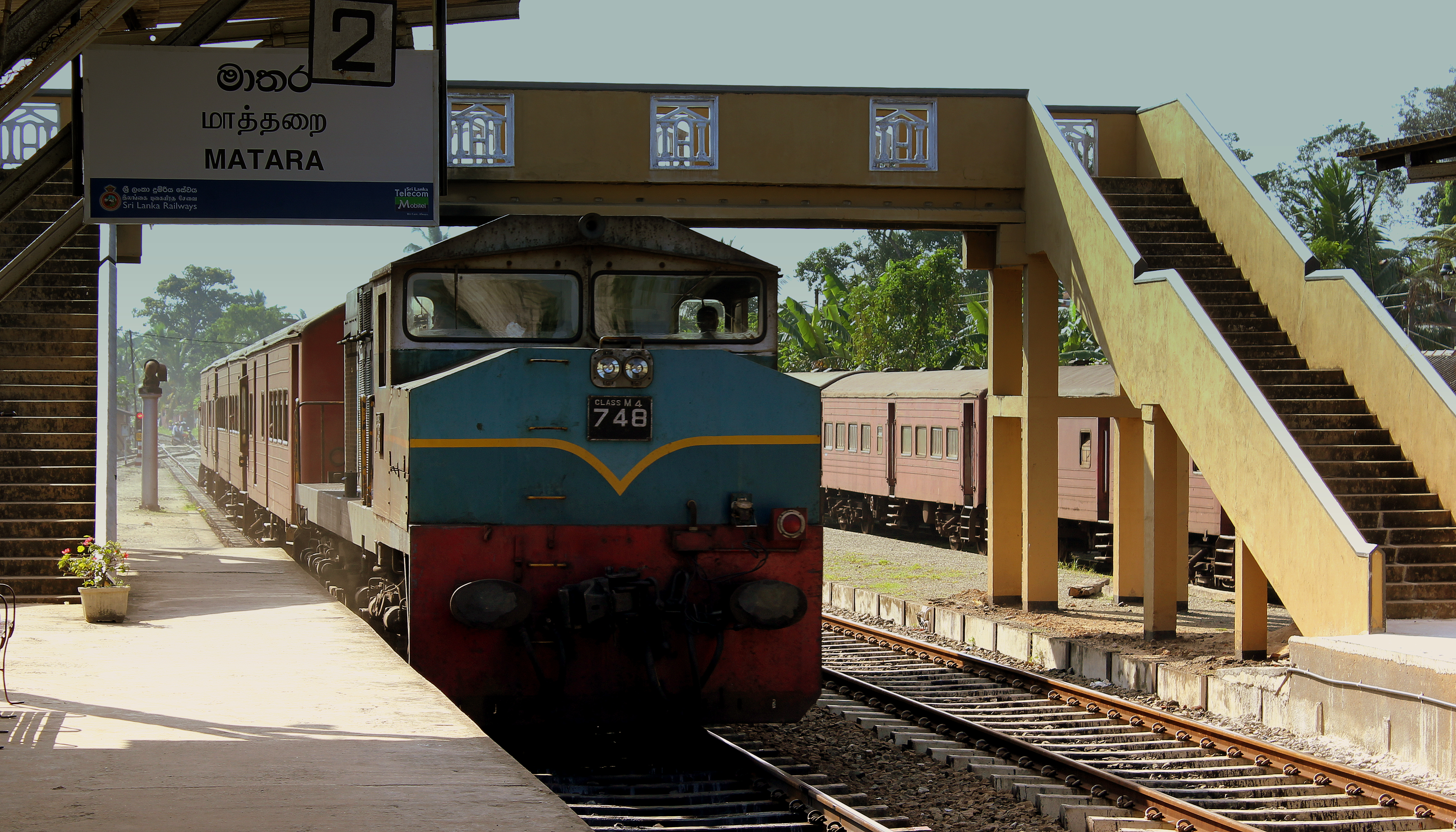

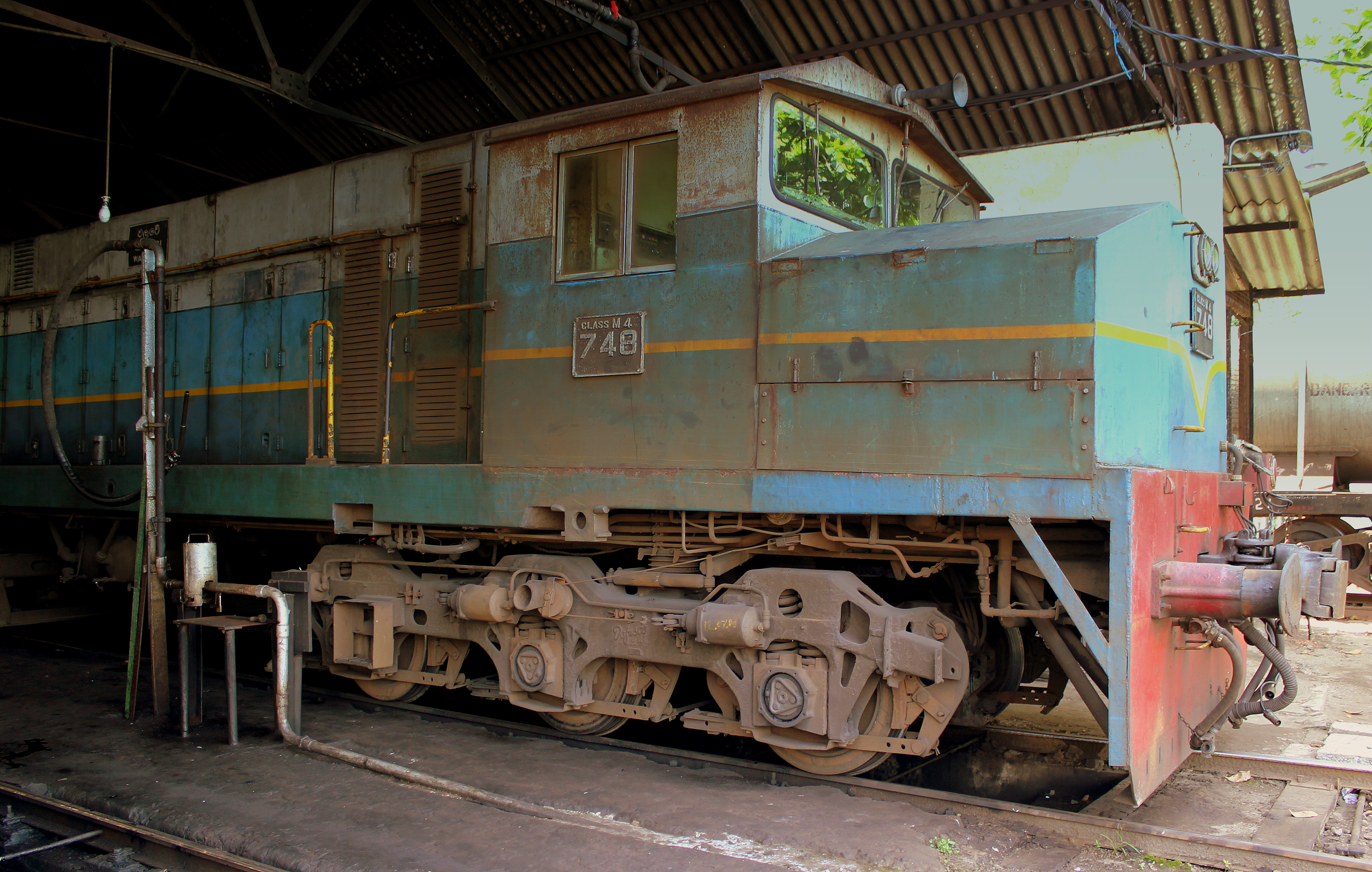

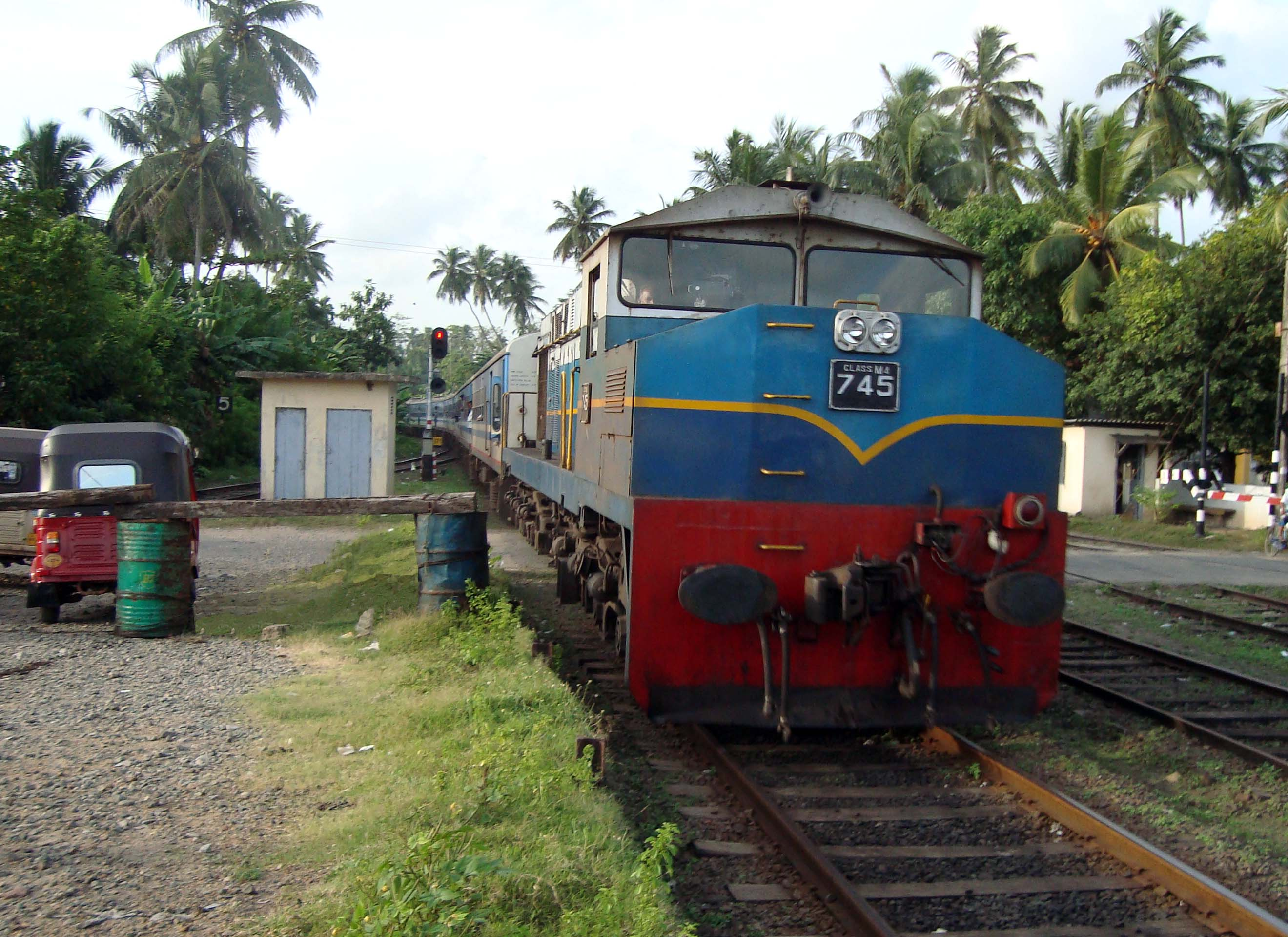
Class M4 No. 745 "Ruwanveli"

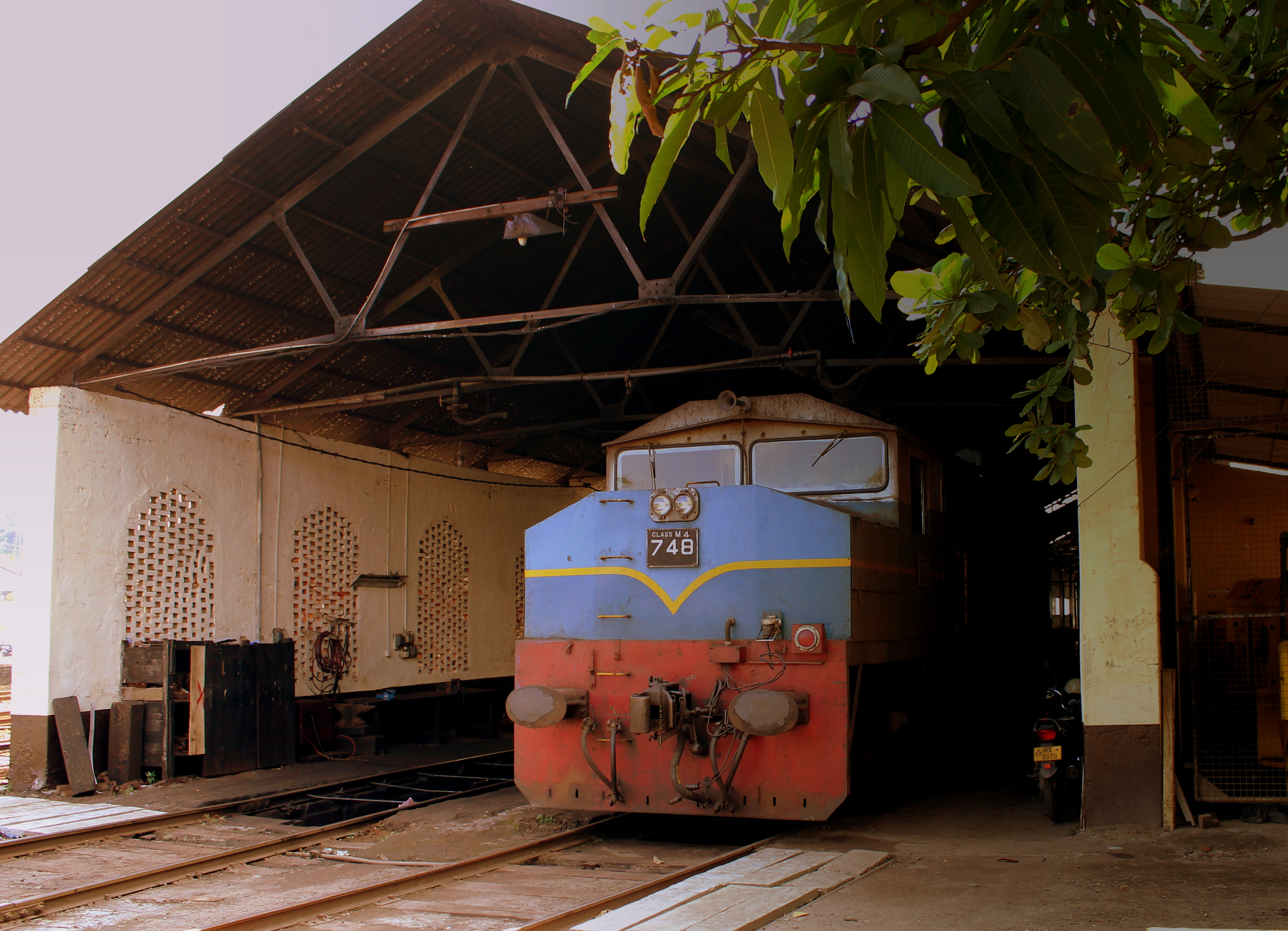
Class M4 No. 748 "Walawe"

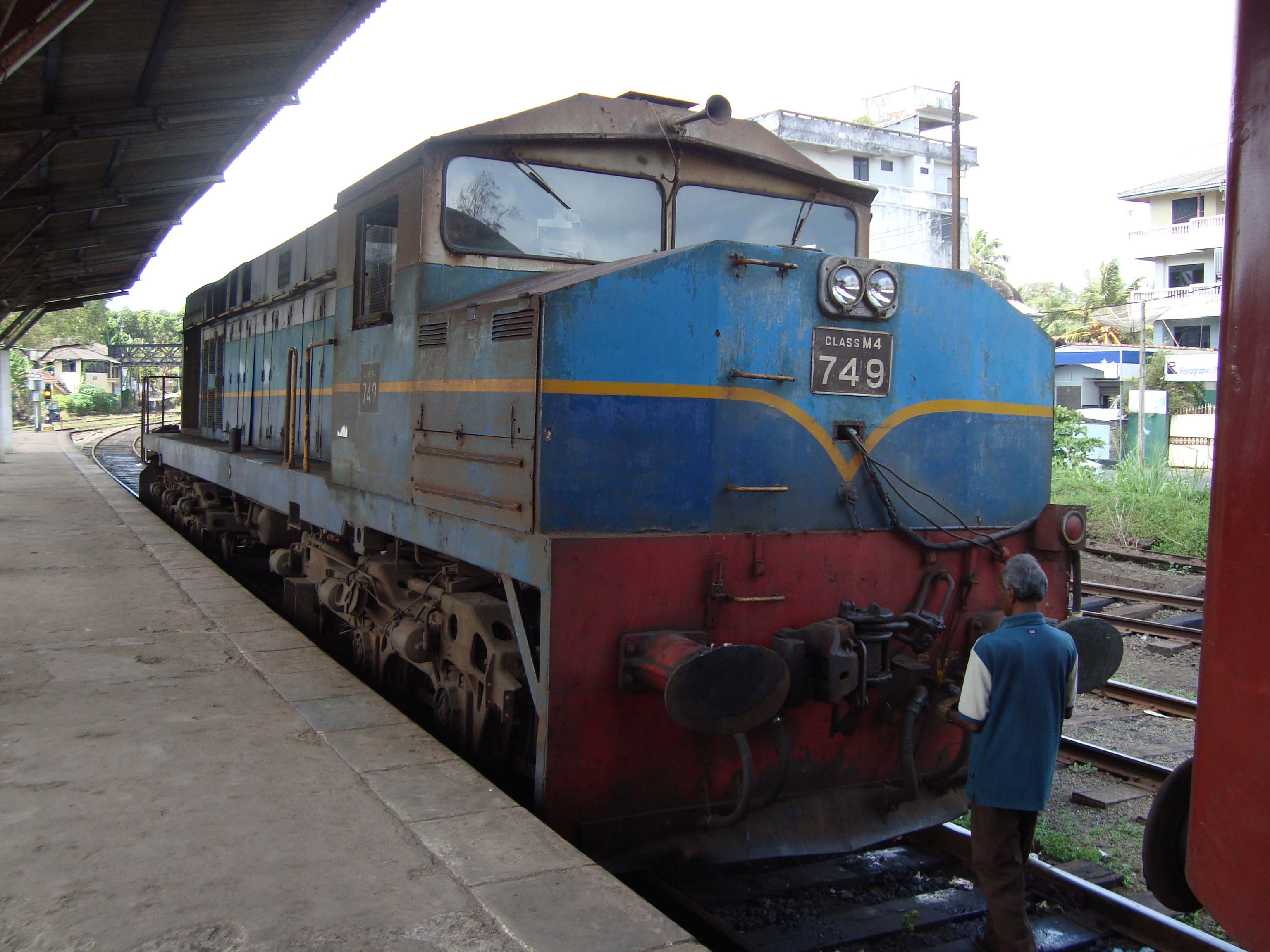
M4 No. 749 "Dunhida"

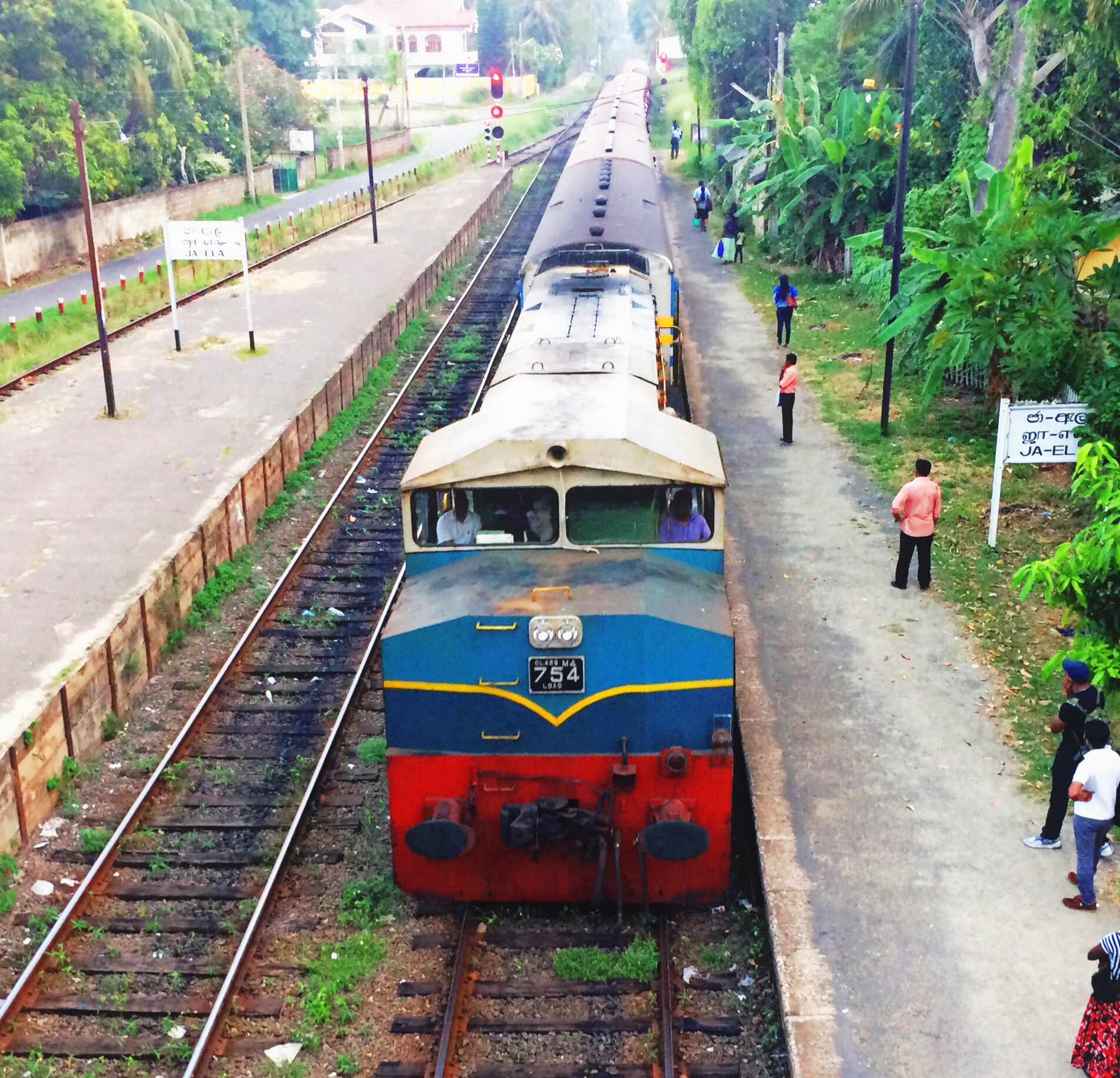
Class M4 No. 754 "Menik"

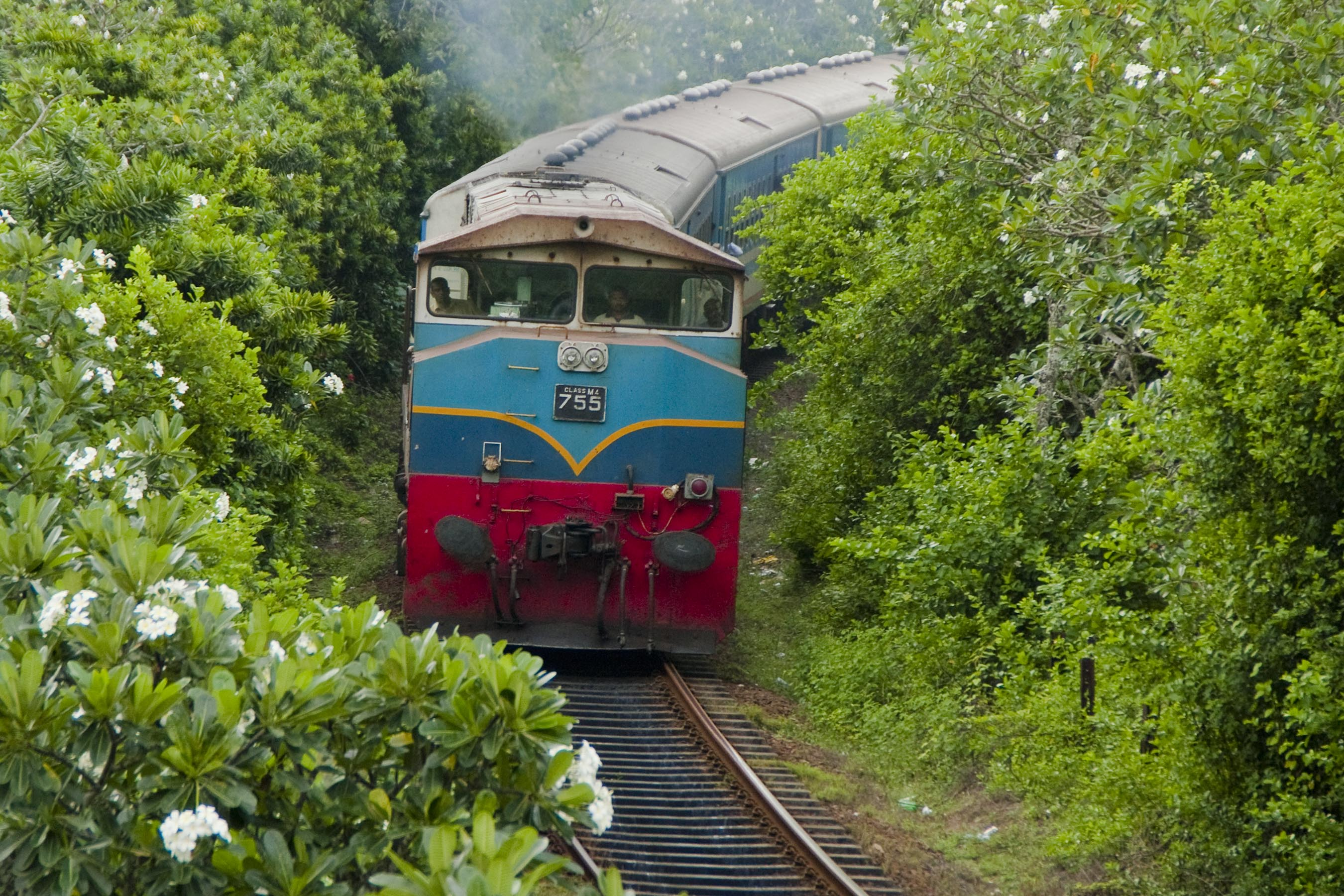
Class M4 No. 755 "Mahaweli"

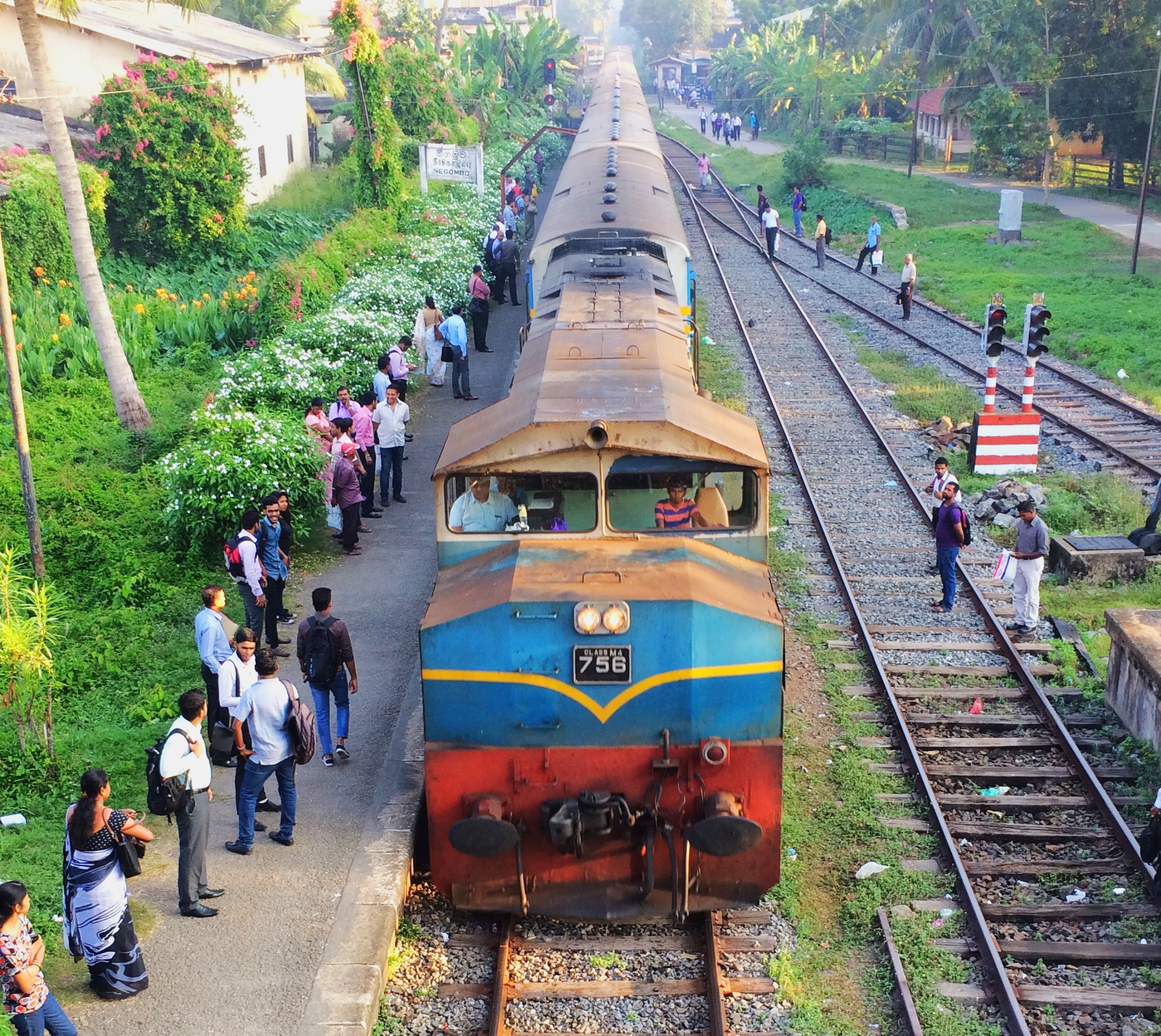
Class M4 No. 756 "Laxapana"

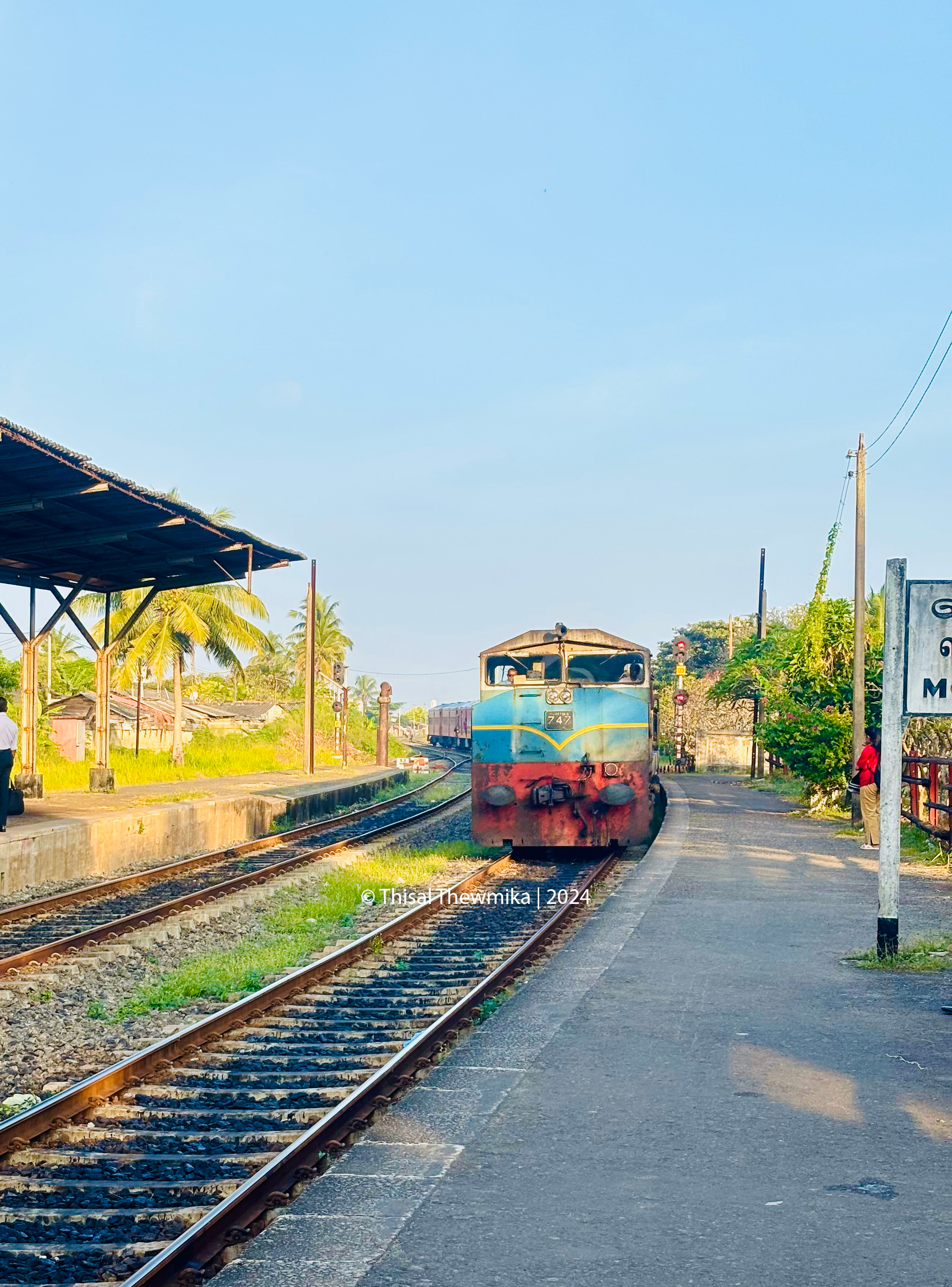
M4 747 "Kelani"

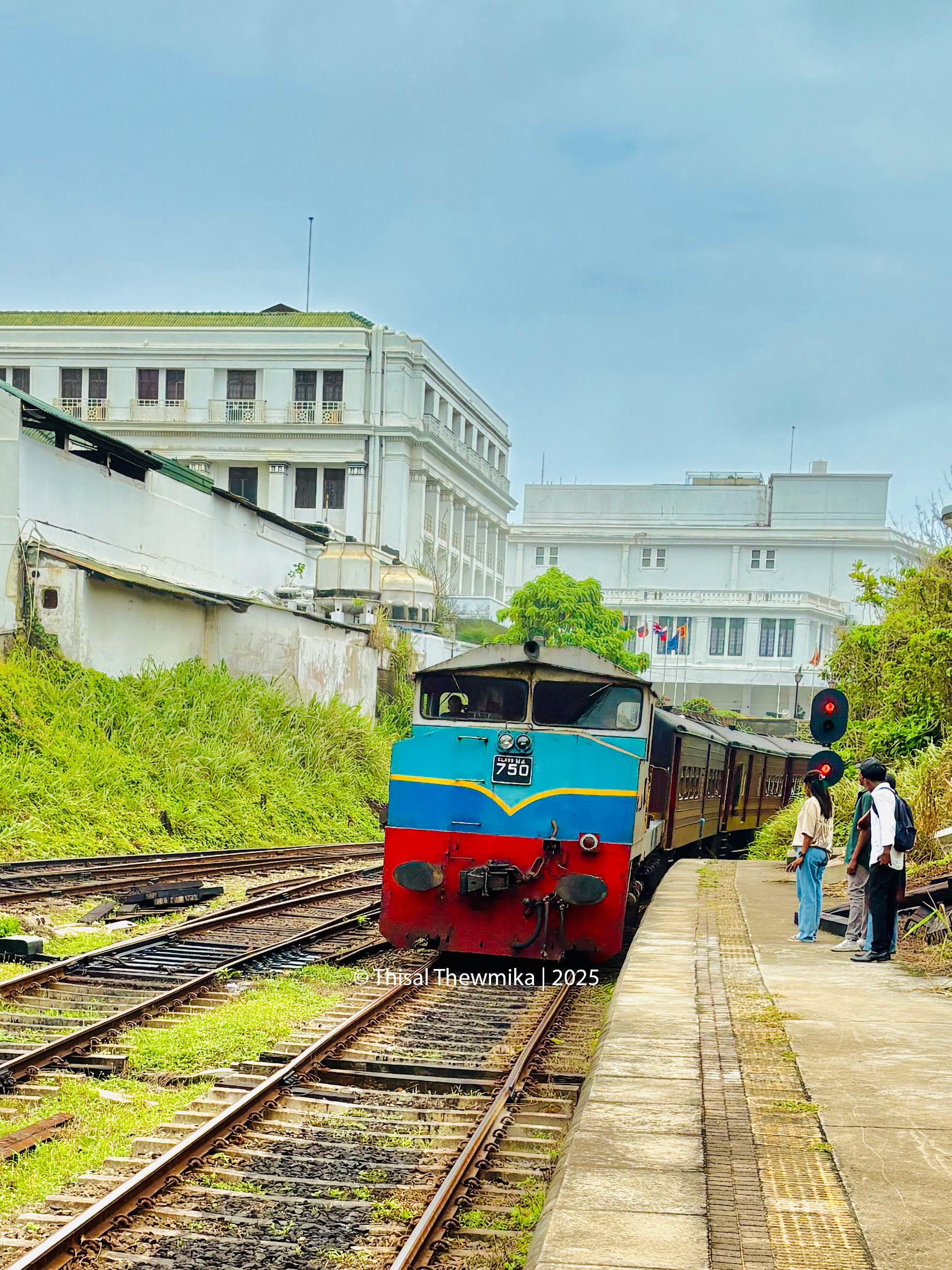
M4 750 "Isurumuni"

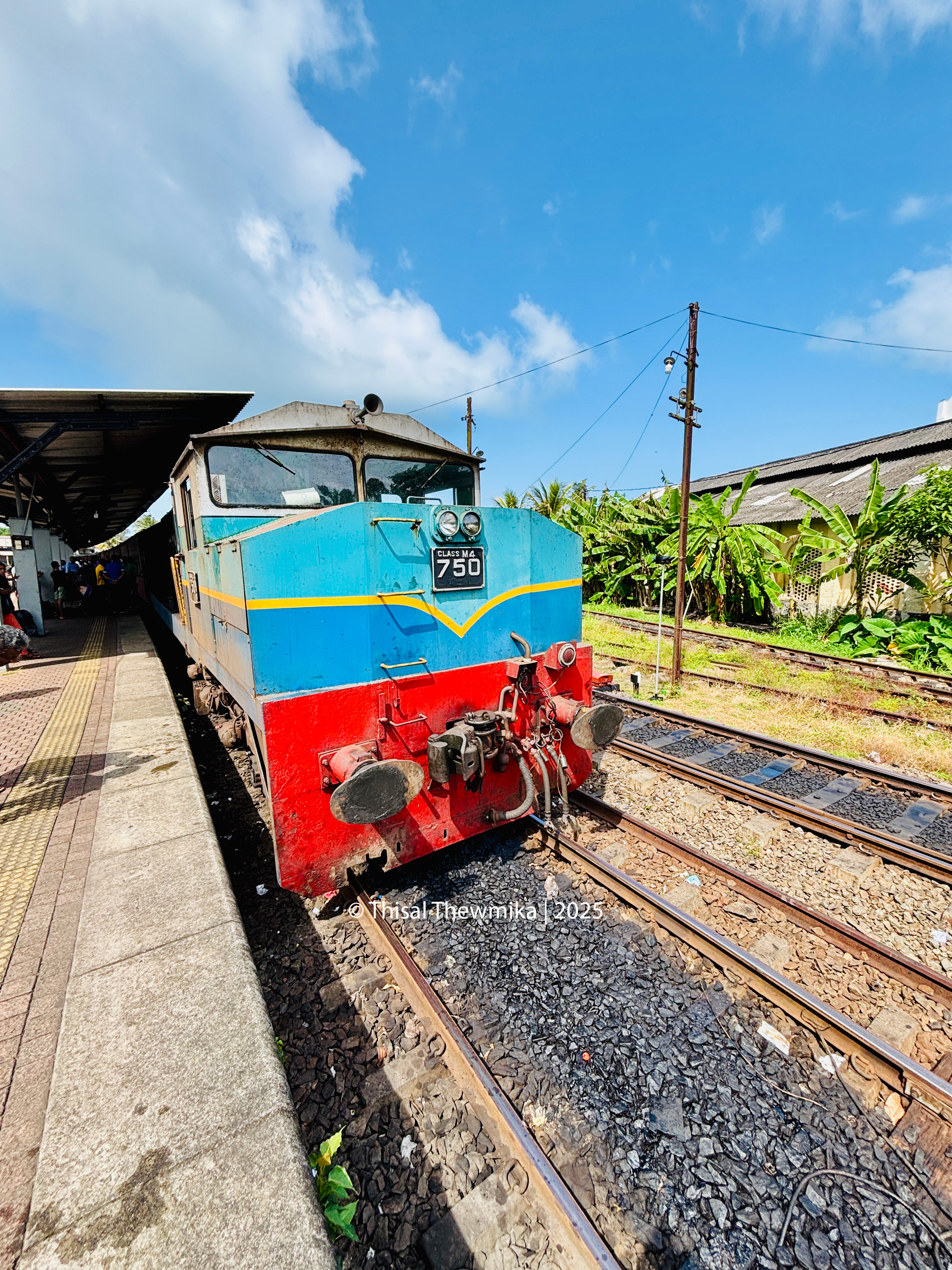
M4 750 "Isurumuni"

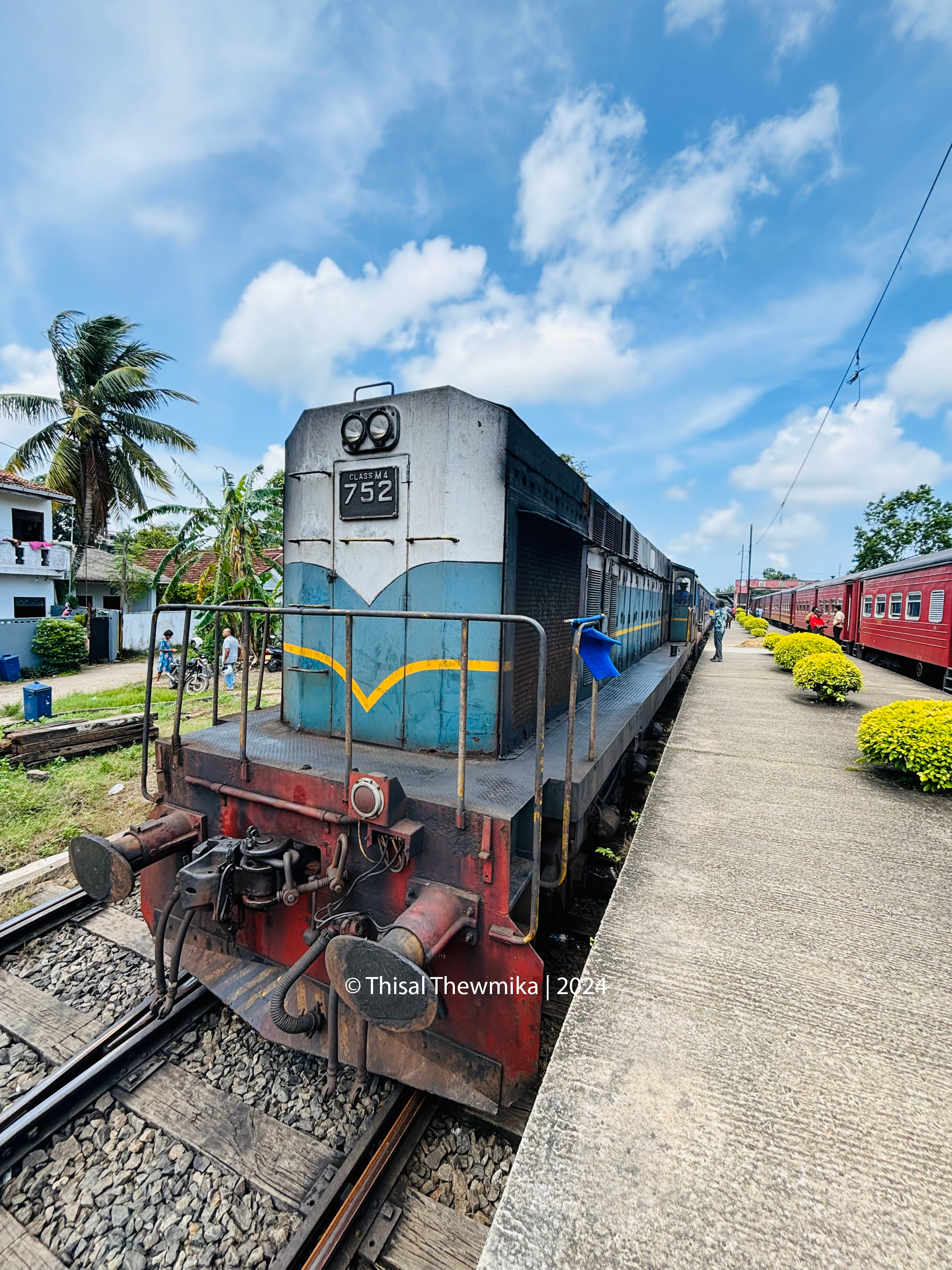
M4 752 "Point Pedro"

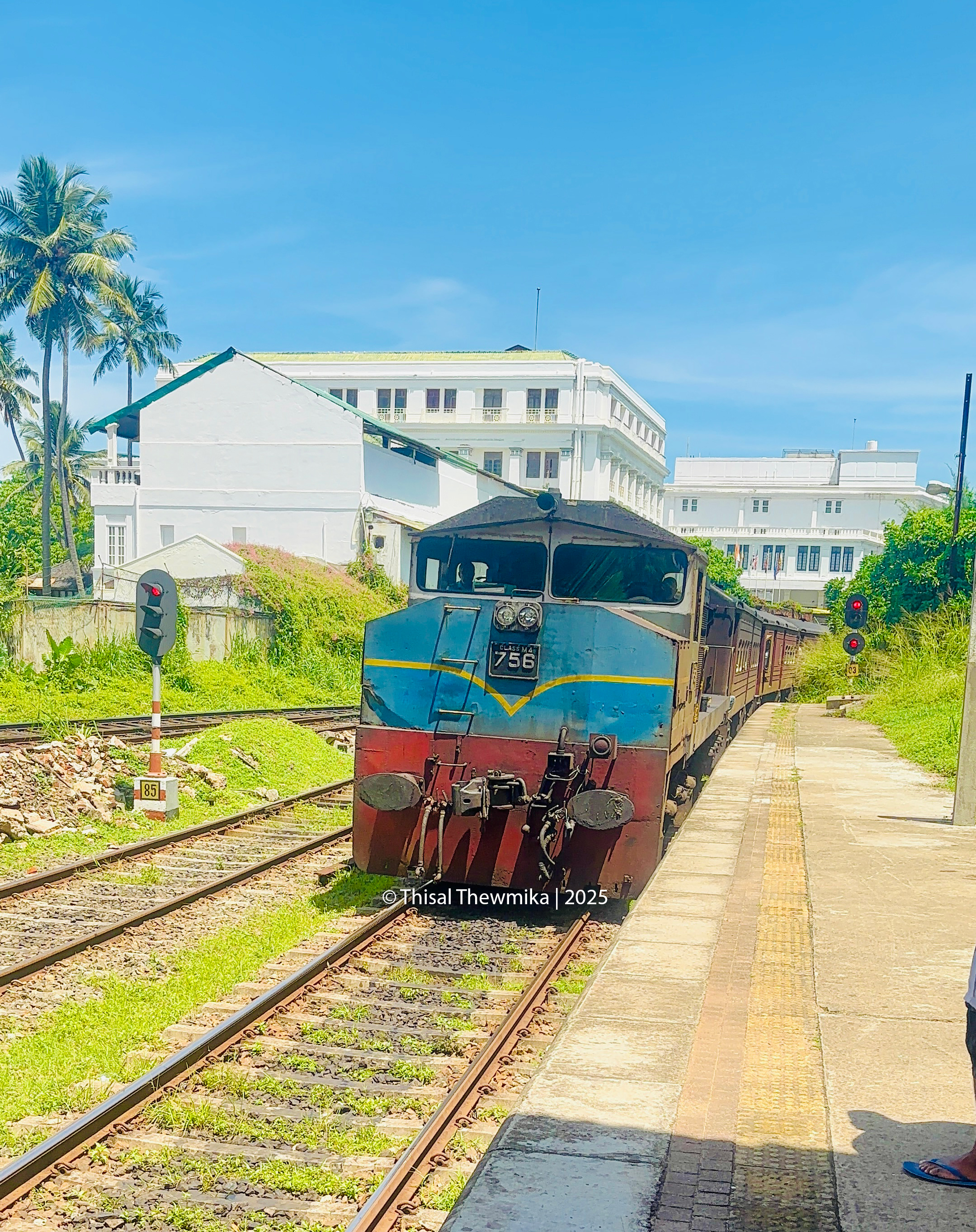
M4 756 "Laxapana"
