= Pothuhera =

Pothuhera පොතුහැර
- Town
- Location within Sri Lanka
- Coordinates: 7°25′11.6″N 80°19′38.6″E
- Country: Sri Lanka
- Province: North Western Province
- District: Kurunegala District

Government
  - Type: Pradeshiya Sabha

Area
  - Total: 11 km^{2} (4.2 sq mi)
- Elevation: 116 m (381 ft)

Population (2011)
  - Total: 30,315
  - Density: 2,817/km^{2} (7,300/sq mi)
- Time zone: UTC+5:30 (Sri Lanka Standard Time Zone)
- Postal code: 60330
- Area code: 037

Pothuhera is a town located in Kurunegala District, Sri Lanka.

== Transport ==
Pothuhera is located on the A6 (Ambepussa-Trincomallee) road.

Pothuhera is situated on the Northern Line and has a railway station, which serves as a stop for trains going from Colombo to Jaffna and Batticaloa.

== Commerce ==
Branches from the following banks are located in Pothuhera: People's Bank, Bank of Ceylon, Regional Development Bank and Sanasa Bank.
