= Batticaloa railway station =

Railway station in Batticaloa, Sri Lanka

Batticaloa மட்டக்களப்பு මඩකලපුව
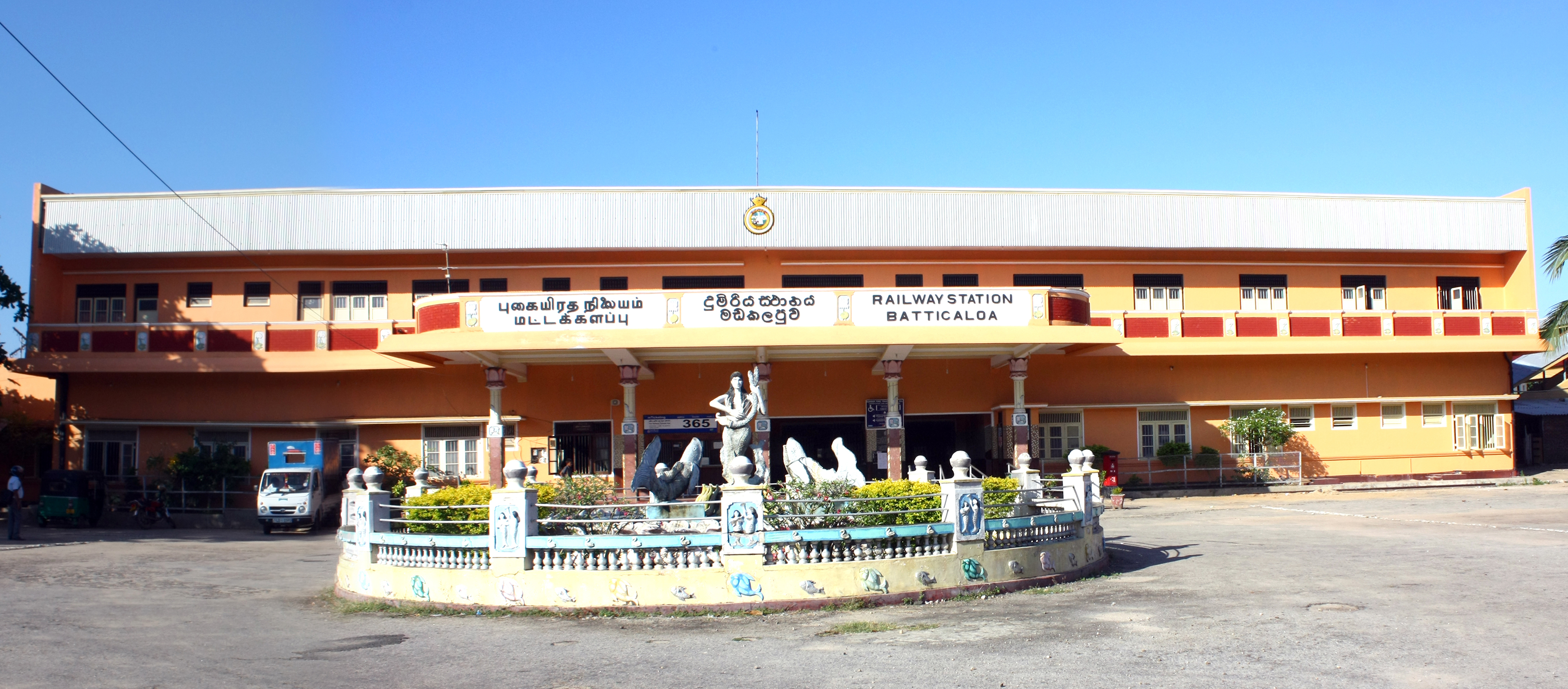

General information
- Location: Batticaloa; Sri Lanka
- Coordinates: 7°43′27.80″N 81°41′55.80″E
- System: Sri Lankan Railway Station
- Owner: Sri Lanka Railways
- Line: Batticaloa line

Other information
- Status: Functioning
- Station code: BCO
Location
- Location within Central Batticaloa

Batticaloa railway station is a railway station in the city of Batticaloa in eastern Sri Lanka. Owned by Sri Lanka Railways, the state-owned railway operator, the station was built in 1928 and is part of the Batticaloa line which links Batticaloa District with the capital Colombo.

== Services ==
Preceding station	Sri Lanka Railways	Following station
Eravur	Batticaloa line	Terminus

== See also ==
- List of railway stations in Sri Lanka
- List of railway stations in Sri Lanka by line
