= Polgahawela railway station =

Railway station in Sri Lanka

Polgahawela Railway Station පොල්ගහවෙල දුම්රිය ස්ථානය பொல்காவலை ரயில் நிலையம்
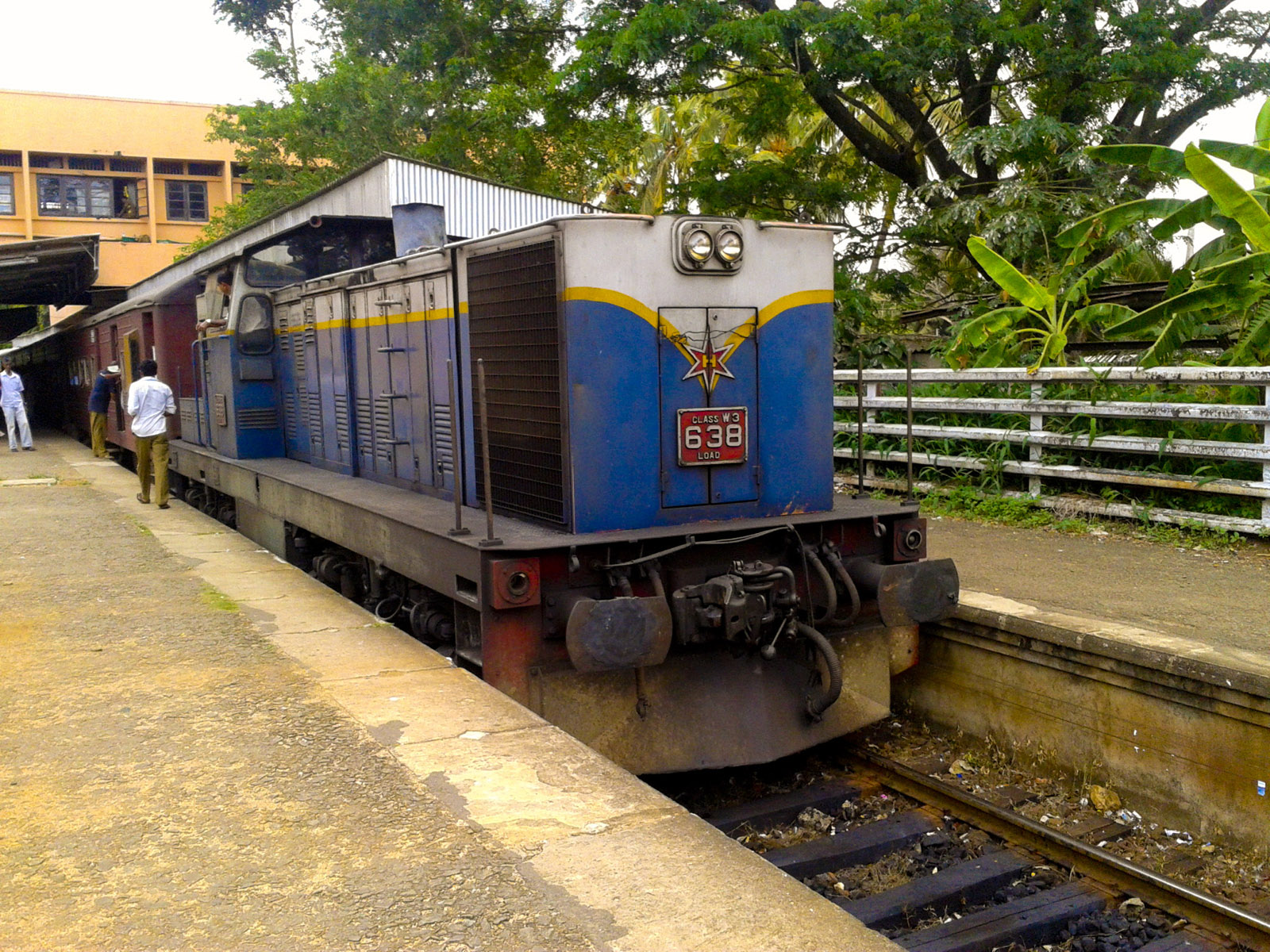
- A train at Polgahawela railway station

General information
- Location: Polgahawela-Kegalle Highway, Polgahawela; Sri Lanka
- Coordinates: 7.3308°N 80.3006°E
- Owner: Sri Lanka Railways
- Operator: Sri Lanka Railways
- Lines: Main Line; Northern Line
- Distance: 73.83 km (45.88 mi) (from Fort)
- Platforms: 3
- Tracks: 2

Other information
- Status: Functioning
- Station code: PLG

History
- Opened: 1 November 1866
- Electrified: No
Location

Polgahawela Junction railway station (Sinhala: පොල්ගහවෙල දුම්රිය ස්ථානය, Tamil: பொல்காவலை ரயில் நிலையம்) is a major junction station, situated in the Kurunegala District, North Western Province, Sri Lanka. It is the 34th railway station on the Main line and is 73.83 kilometres (45.88 mi) away from the Colombo Fort Railway Station, at an elevation of 74.39 metres (244.1 ft) above sea level. The station is located at the centre of Polgahawela and is a main junction point joining two railway lines; one coming from the upcountry of Sri Lanka and another from the northern part of the country.

- The Main Line connects with Kandy, Matale, Nawalapitiya and Badulla.
- The Northern Line connects with Anuradhapura, Jaffna, and Kankesanturai, and leads to all other lines in the North.

The station serves as a terminus for several commuter trains, with all local trains and long distance trains running on the Main Line, Northern Line, Trincomalee Line, and Batticaloa Line, stopping at the station. Intercity express trains do not stop at the station.

== History ==
The Colombo to Kandy railway line (what is now known as the Main line) was extended in stages, with the first stage to Ambepussa completed in December 1864 and the next stage to Polgahawela in November 1866. The railway station was constructed during this period and it opened to the public on 1 November in the same year as an ordinary train station. In 1894, the station became a junction station when a new branch line connecting Polgahawela to Kurunegala was constructed, this was the first section of the Northern line project. The Polgahaela to Kurunegala branch line was officially opened on 14 February 1894 by Governor Sir Arthur Elibank Havelock.

== Continuity ==
Preceding station	Sri Lanka Railways	Following station
Veyangoda	Udarata Menike	Panaliya
Veyangoda	Podi Menike	Panaliya
Veyangoda	Tikiri Menike	Panaliya
Veyangoda	Senkadagala Menike	Panaliya
Veyangoda	Rajarata Rajina	Potuhara
Walakumbura	Commuter Rail	Terminus

== See also ==
- List of railway stations in Sri Lanka
- List of railway stations by line order in Sri Lanka
