= Maho railway station =

Railway station in Maho, Sri Lanka

Maho Junction

General information
- Location: Maho, Sri Lanka; Sri Lanka
- Coordinates: 7.8231°N 80.2751°E
- System: Sri Lankan Railway Station
- Owner: Sri Lanka Railways
- Line: Northern Line
- Connections: Batticaloa line

Other information
- Status: functioning
- Station code: MHO
Location

Maho Junction Railway Station (also known as Mahawa railway station) is a junction railway station in the town of Mahawa. Owned by Sri Lanka Railways, the state-owned railway operator, the station is part of the Northern line which links north of the country with the capital Colombo.

The station is the 46th station and is located 136.68 km (84.93 mi) from Colombo Fort, 65 km (40 mi) from Polgahawela and situated 92.07 m (302.1 ft) above sea level. The station opened in 1903 when the Northern line was extended from Kurunegala to Anuradhapura. In 1926 the station became a junction station, following the completion of the Batticaloa line.This Railway station use tablet exchange system.

== Continuity ==
Preceding station	Sri Lanka Railways	Following station
Thimbiriyagedara	Northern Line	Randenigama
Terminus	Batticaloa line	Yapahuwa
