= Uduvil =

Uduvil உடுவில் උඩුවිල
- Village
- Location within Northern Province
- Coordinates: 9°44′0″N 80°0′0″E
- Country: Sri Lanka
- Province: Northern
- District: Jaffna
- DS Division: Valikamam South
- Divisional Council: Valikamam South
- Time zone: UTC+5:30 (Sri Lanka Standard Time)

Uduvil (Tamil: உடுவில்) is an agricultural village of about 32.7 square kilometers situated along the KKS Road at about five miles to the North of Jaffna city, Sri Lanka. It is surrounded by the villages Chunnākam, Kandarōdai, Sanguvēli, Mānipāy, Suthumalai and Inuvil. KKS Road and Kaithady - Mānipāy Road intersect at Uduvil and the Junction is called 'Maruthanār Madam' Junction. The name 'Maruthanār Madam' came into use because of the public resting place (Madam) situated at the North - Western corner of the junction. The old building that still exists is not in use nowadays. Two main roads, the Kaithady - Mānipāy Road and the branching Dutch Road cut through the village. The fork point is called 'Uduvil Junction.' A cross road connects the Dutch Road and the Puttūr - Chankānai Road that passes through Chunnākam Junction. It is called Uduvil - Kandarōdai Road. The nearest town to Uduvil is Chunnākam.

From ancient time until the mid - 20th century, Maruthanār Madam junction had been the assembly place for bullock carts from the villages in the north, south and west of the junction to start their long journey to Vanni and the south. Thus, there were a public well, stone water troughs and large trees at the junction.

A total of 3604 families live in Uduvil. Out of the total population of 10,277, male population is 4704 and the females 5573.

The inhabitants of Uduvil (also called 'Uduvilār') are proud of their strong educational and cultural base. Udvilārs are mainly professionals, government servants, teachers and farmers.

Presently, Uduvil village is divided into five administrative 'Grama Niladāry' Divisions. They are Uduvil North, Uduvil North centre, Uduvil Centre, Uduvil South East and Uduvil South west.

Uduvil comes under the jurisdiction of the Mallākam Court. It comes under the Administrative Division of the 'Vali - South' Divisional Secretariat, the local government body of the 'Vali- South' Pradeshiya Sabha and Chunnākam Police. Telephone number of the Chunnaakam Police Station is: 021 224 0323.

== Etymology ==
The meaning of the Tamil word 'Uduvil' has been a problem for the historians and linguists. Various explanations have been given by them. On the other hand, various websites claim that the name 'Uduvil' is actually a Tamilized Sinhala word 'Uduvila.'

But the composite word 'Uduvil' is derived Tamil. The composite written word 'Uduvil' could be broken down in two ways: (i) 'Udu' + 'il'; (ii) 'Udu' + 'vil.'

In Tamil language, the words 'udu,' 'Il,' and 'vil' exist. When the basic sounds 'u' and 'i' combine, we get the compound sound 'vi.' Thus, 'udu' + 'il' becomes 'Uduvil.

According to the Tamil dictionaries, the word 'Udu' means: a star; an arrow; the point or barb of an arrow; a goat; imp. dress, attire, put on cloths;a boatman's pole; ditch round a fort; a tree- Mimosa etc.

In Tamil, 'Il' means a place; a house and some others.

The word 'Vil' means: light; a bow; imp. sell, put in sale.

But the words 'Udu,' 'il' and 'Vil' have some other meanings also. Linguists have not understood how a Tamil written word gets its meaning. Tamil grammarian Tolkāppiyan had said: "Molipporul Kāranam vilippath thōnrā." Though the Commentators of Tolkāppiyam: Theivachchilaiyār, Nachchinārkkiniyar and Sēnāvaraiyar had explained this in their Commentaries, Tamil linguists failed to understand what Tolkāppiyan had said and they are not in a position to know all the meanings of a particular Tamil word.

The Tamil word 'Vil' could also mean a park or a village. The word 'udu' could also mean Shining, enlightened.

Thus the composite word 'Uduvil' could mean 'Enlightened (Udu) place or house (il)' and 'Place of people with cloth.'

Therefore, 'Uduvil' could mean: the place or village of Buddha Dhamma or where the Buddhist Monks live'!

This may make the Sinhala 'Thēravāda' Buddhists to come to a hurried conclusion that the Sinhala 'Thēravāda' Buddhists only lived in the village at ancient time.

The Tamils were 'Mahāyāna' Buddhists and later adhered to Saivaism, the perfected 'Mahāyāna' Buddhist philosophy. This is the reason why we find a number of Kannaki Kōvils in the North and East of Ceylon. In 'uduvil' also there existed an ancient Kannaki Kōvil situated at 'Sitthāwatthai,' Uduvil. Later it was converted into Saivaite Amman Temple. The land adjoining on the eastern side of the temple is now called 'Pūthar Walavu.' It should have been 'Putthar Walawu.'

'Silappathikāram' is a Mahāyāna Buddhist epic. The epic 'Silappathikāram' emphasizes the married life and the epic 'Manimēhalai' the renounced life. Renounced life has no meaning and possibility without the existence of married life. Thus, 'Mahāyāna' Buddhism emphasises these two. That was the reason why the 'Mahāyāna' Buddhist Monk 'Thiruvalluvan' in his 'Kural' placed the main chapter 'Domestic Virtue' at the beginning. The three small chapters 'the Praise of God,' 'the Might of Virtue, and 'the Greatness of Ascetics' placed at the beginning of 'Kural' praise the Buddhist Triple Gem.

Also, the four stanzas placed at the beginning of 'Silappathikāram' praise Buddha (1st stanza), Dhamma (second and third) and Sanga (fourth). In the Sinhala literature 'Vayanthimālaya' that describes the early life of Kannaki and Kōvalan also, we find stanzas that praise Buddha, Dhamma and Sanga placed at the beginning. There are a number of Sinhala literature that praise the Triple-Gem at the beginning.

Symbolizing a literature or a book by praising the Buddhist Triple Gem is the literary symbolization of Buddhism.

The 'Thēravāda' Buddhism rejects completely the Purānas, literature, symbolization, symbolization of Buddha and Buddhism, music, dance, and other forms of fine arts. 'Mahāyāna' Buddhism only utilised these to propagate Buddhism and assist all the people to practice Buddhism and attain Nibbāna.

However, one of the Tamil historians Dr. Ragupathy has given the explanation that 'Uduvil' means 'acacia pond.' 'Acacia' is a thorny bush. In Tamil it is called 'Udai' and in Sinhala 'Uda.' His interpretation is based on breaking 'Uduvil' as 'Udu + vil.'

== Religion ==
The Saivites, Protestant Christians and Catholics live in harmony for generations. Compared to other populated villages of the Jaffna peninsula, there are only a few big Saiva Kōvils and Churches.

There are only three big Saiva kōvils. The oldest is the 'Uduvil Amman Temple' situated at 'Siththāwatthai' along the field. It is visible from Uduvil - Kandarōdai Road. It was earlier a 'Kannaki' Temple. The stone image of Kannaki is placed in front of the Kody sthambam.

The annual 11 days festival of the Amman temple ends on the day of 'Citthirai paruvam.' That is Full moon day of the month 'Citthirai' (April - May).

In the 19th century, a campaign to convert Kannaki temples into Amman temples was initiated by Arumuga Nāvalar and Vaishnavaite Brāhmins were allowed to perform pūjās in these Saiva temples. Almost all the Brāhmins of Jaffna peninsula are Vaishnavaites. However, there are 'Saiva Kurukals' who also perform pūjās in the Saiva temples.

The old 'Kāli Kōvil' of the artisans is situated at about a quarter of a kilometer from the Amman Kōvil. It is now renovated and Kumbāpishēkam took place in mid-2012.

The other big temples are 'Katpakkunai Pillaiyār kōvil' (on Uduvil - Kandarōdai Road) 'Siva Gnāna Pillaiyār Temple' on Kaithady - Mānipāy Road (near Uduvil Girls' College)and Uduvil East 'Katpaka Pillayār Temple.'

The 'Murugamōrthy Kōvil' situated at Malvam, Panchamuka Pillaiyār Kōvil in the North of Uduvil Girls' College, Nāgamāl temple along the Ambalavānar Road and Pēchchi Amman temple at Kollan Ōlai were built recently.

Apart from these kōvils, in almost all the lands where particular families live, small kōvils are found. Most of these small Kōvils are called 'Vairavar Kōvil.' In these Kōvils, we find straight limbed 'Tiri-sūla.' In the ancient Buddhist coins of the North, this symbol was used in combination with some other symbols to symbolize 'the Triple Gem' of Buddhism. Daily Lamp Lighting in these Kōvils are carried out by the family members. Until very recently, no Brāhmins were allowed to perform poojas in these family temples.

There are two old Catholic churches (one in the North-Uduvil and the other in Malvam) and one old Protestant Church (Uduvil Girls' College) in Uduvil. Very recently a Protestant church was built in between Maruthanār Madam Junction and Uduvil- Dutch Road junction.

A few Buddhist archaeological finds were discovered in Uduvil in 1917. But in the adjoining Eastern part (Kallākkadduwan), Northern part (Kotthiyāwatthai) and Western part (Kandarōdai), archaeological studies have revealed that Mahāyāna Buddhism existed there. The Sinhalese who claim themselves as 'Thēravāda' Buddhists failed to study 'symbolization' in Mahāyāna Buddhism. This made them come to a wrong conclusion that Buddhist sites mean Sinhala 'Thēravāda' Buddhist sites!

Sinhala and Muslim traders have at times settled in Uduvil. Businesspeople from other parts of Jaffna have also moved to the village, in some cases citing the availability of education for their children.

== Education ==
Uduvil Girls' College, an important landmark in Uduvil was the first ladies boarding school in Asia. This school was founded in 1824 by American Missionaries. The college currently has over 1300 students. There are several primary and other secondary schools in Uduvil.

Popular secondary schools near Uduvil are Rāmanāthan College, Mānipāy Memorial College and Skandavarōdaya College. Rāmanāthan Academy of Fine Arts (University of Jaffna) is also located in the neighbourhood of Rāmanāthan College along the Manipay-Kaithady Road.

The Vali - South Pradēsha Sabā main public library is located at Periya-mathavady (Uduvil), it is called Uduvil Public Library. Another Branch library is located at Maruthanār Madam Junction, Uduvil.

== Local Administration ==
Before the establishment of Police Station at Chunnākam in 1947, village administration of Uduvil was under 'Police Vidāne.' After the establishment of Police Station, it was administered by 'Village Headman.' From 1963, 'Grama Sevaka' and later 'Grama Niladāry' took over the village administration.

Vettivēlu Abimanasingham of Sitthāwatthai, Uduvil, served continuously as the 'Police Vidāne' and 'Village Headman' of Uduvil for a period of 33 years from 1930. In the mid-'30s, because of violent clashes between two communities of Chunnākam village, nobody from Chunnākam village or any other part of the Jaffna Peninsula was prepared to assume the duty of 'Police Vidāne' of Chunnākam. Thus, on the request of the British Crown Administrator of the Jaffna Peninsula, Mr. Vettivēlu Abimanasingham took over the charge of the Chunnākam village also for two years and brought normalcy in the village.

=== Uduvil Electoral District ===
Uduvil Electoral District was an electoral district of Sri Lanka between March 1960 and February 1989. The district was renamed Manipay Electoral District in July 1977. The district was named after the towns of Uduvil and Manipay in Jaffna District, Northern Province. The 1978 Constitution of Sri Lanka introduced the proportional representation electoral system for electing members of Parliament. The existing 160 mainly single-member electoral districts were replaced with 22 multi-member electoral districts.[1] Manipay electoral district was replaced by the Jaffna multi-member electoral district at the 1989 general elections, the first under the PR system, though Manipay continues to be a polling division of the multi-member electoral district.

The Valikāmam South Divisional Secretariat is situated near Periya-mathavaddy in Uduvil North. The Police Station, Post Office, Valikāmam South Pradēshya Sabhā Head Office and main Railway Station are in the Chunnākam town. The Valikāmam South Pradēshya Sabhā main office is now being shifted to its new building in Uduvil (between Maruthanār Madam and Roddyālady on the KKS Road). Due to politics, in the night just before the ceremonial opening of the building, waste black oil was thrown all over its front walls and pillars. The land for this building was donated by a citizen from the village Uduvil. The Education Department Office for the Uduvil Division is situated near the Rāmanāthan College on the Kaithady - Mānipāy Road. The Office of the Uduvil veterinary Surgeon's office is situated at 'Kotthiyālady in Chunnākam along the Putūr - Chankānai Road.

=== Underground and surface water and farming ===
Uduvil has a long stretch (about 1 1/2 km) of wide (about 3/4 km) agricultural field in the north, running east–west. Its soil is fertile. In its northern field, underground water is available at 5 1/2 to 6 feet. There is a large tank along its Kantharōdai boundary in the north-west. Paddy is cultivated in the rainy season only. All types of vegetables, chilli, lentils, grains and tobacco are cultivated in the other seasons. The mango, jack, plantain, coconut and palmyrah trees grow freely.

Availability of underground water, tank, fertility of the soil, long stretch of agricultural field etc. could have made Uduvil as one of the ancient agricultural settlements in the Jaffna peninsula.

Uduvil has a stretch of agricultural field in the south also. However, underground water is available at 15–25 feet only. Thus, there is no surface tank here. Tobacco, onion and other vegetables are cultivated here. No paddy cultivation is carried out in this field.

=== Markets ===
Uduvil has a big vegetable and fruits market at Maruthanār Madam Junction. In Chunnākam also, there is a big vegetable, fish and meat market. There is a small vegetable and fish market called 'Kīlichchanthai' at Kalaviyawatthai along the Dutch Road.

=== Hotel and other facilities ===
There are no hotel facilities, cultural centre, sport stadium and cinema theatre in Uduvil. However the 'Northern Sangētha Sabhā' building is in construction along the K.K.S Road near the Vali South Pradēsa Sabhā main office. There are three Guest Houses and lodgings having rooms with or without air conditions and meals situated in between 'Periya Mathavady' and 'Maruthnār Madam' Junction along the KKS Road.

There are three bake houses in Uduvil. One at Uduvil Periya Mathavady along the K.K.S Road, the other at Kalaviyawatthai along the Dutch Road and the third one near Nāgamāl Kōvil along the Ambalavānar Road.

Cable telephone and internet facilities are available. But no public Net Cafes.

There are no liquor shops or Bars in Uduvil. However, there is one Toddy Bar opened only in the day time. All the shops close by 9 pm.

=== Bank, Postal and Insurance facilities ===
Main Post Office is situated at Chunnākam. A number of private courier services also have branches there. There's also a sub post office in Uduvil-Manipay road. Almost all the Banks of Sri Lanka have their branches at Chunnākam. Some private insurance companies also have their Branches at Chunnākam.

=== Electricity, Water and Gas Supply ===
230 Volts Electricity supply is available in the whole village. Electricity is supplied by thermal power station at Chunnākam. New high voltage transmission lines and sub - stations are being constructed to connect Jaffna peninsula with the main grid.

There is no pipe borne central water and central gas supply. Underground water from wells is used by the householders and business and other establishments.

=== Transport facilities ===
There are two railway stations close to Uduvil. Chunnākam Railway station is one of the main railway stations. It is situated about half a kilometer from the Chunnākam Junction towards Puttur. Almost all the trains to and fro from the South stop there. Tickets to all the places could be booked directly or on-line. The next one is Inuvil Railway station. It is situated half a kilometer from Maruthanār Madam Junction towards Urumpirāi along the Manipāy - Kaithady Road. Express trains do not stop at Inuvil.

Day and night buses to Colombo ply along the K.K.S. Road. From Paranthan, Vavuniya along the A-9 road, Eastern towns and places of the Central Region could be reached. From Jaffna, almost all the main places in the island could be reached by bus.

Almost all the main places in the Jaffna Peninsula could be reached by local buses plying along the K.K.S. Road and Manipāy - Kaithady Road. The Point Pedro-Navāly, Vaddukōddai bus (No 766,767) and Jaffna - Uduvil (771) double decker buses were very popular bus services operated via Uduvil for a long time until the mid-eighties. A bus service from Maruthanār Madam to Kārainagar along the Dutch Road has been operating from last year. All the other bus services (No 768, 769, 770, 795) operate along the K.K.S. Road. Another bus service from Kodikāmam to Manipāy (No 811) via Chavakacheri, Kaithady, Urumpirāi, Maruthanār Madam junction Uduvil, also operate along Manipāy-Kaithady Road.

Bicycle and motorcycle are the main modes of transport. Taxi cabs are not in service. Only three-wheel autos are available for normal hire.

Two-wheel and three-wheel land vehicles with trailers are available for transport of goods.

Uduvil, during the 1980s and 1990s, has felt a heavy presence of the government army. The headquarters of the '513 Brigade' was located near Uduvil Girls' College.
