= 2005 Inuvil shooting and protests =

- Inuvil (Northern Province)
- Date: 4 August 2005
- Location: Inuvil, Sri Lanka; 9°43′00.7″N 80°01′18.7″E
- Deaths: 2
- Injuries: 1

On 4 August 2005, a barber was accidentally shot dead by soldiers in Inuvil in northern Sri Lanka. A police officer was abducted and killed in the subsequent protests by locals.

== Shooting ==
At around 1 PM on 4 August 2005, five soldiers arrived at a barbershop at Inuvil Junction on the Jaffna-Kankesanturai road in Inuvil. Three of the soldiers handed over their firearms to the other two who stepped outside. As two of the soldiers were having their hair cut, a firearm discharged from outside, piercing the flimsy metal frontage of the barbershop and hitting barbers Jeyaseelan Shantharubann (23) and K. Logathas (29). Shantharubann, a native of the Trincomalee District living in Kondavil and working in his uncle's barbershop, was pronounced dead on arrival at Jaffna Hospital. Logathas was treated for shock.

== Protests ==
As news of the shooting spread, tension mounted in the area and locals began to gather at the scene at around 3 PM. Troops stationed nearby also rushed to scene, but were met by an angry crowd that blocked the road by cutting down nearby trees, burnt tyres and stoned army vehicles. The protestors demanded that the soldiers, who they claimed had deliberately shot the barbers, be brought to justice.

With around 1,000 people taking part in the protests, police from nearby Achchuveli and Chunnakam arrived at the scene together with the riot squad. By 5 PM, the situation was worsening when Superintendent Charles Wijewardena arrived with reinforcements. Wijewardena, the most senior police officer at the scene, decided to negotiate with the protestors and walked over to them, leaving the police position which was some distance from the protestors. As dusk fell, the police lost sight of Wijewardena who had disappeared. Eyewitnesses claimed that Wijewardena had been taken captive by protestors and taken away from the protest site.

A search operation was mounted and the Sri Lanka Monitoring Mission (SLMM), an organization responsible for monitoring of the ceasefire between the Government of Sri Lanka and the Liberation Tigers of Tamil Eelam (LTTE), was informed of Wijewardena's disappearance. Wijewardena's body was found in Palavodai on the Inuvil-Suthumalai road about 2 km from the shooting site. His body had cut and stab wounds and he was in a sarong rather than trousers.

The protesters dispersed after a curfew was imposed, initially in the Valikamam region only and later the whole of the Jaffna District.

Wijewardena's funeral was held on 7 August 2005 in his hometown of Kurunegala.

== Investigation ==
On 5 August 2005, police from Manipay produced five soldiers before Mallakam magistrate Sarjoini Illangovan in connection with the shooting incident. The two soldiers who had been possession of the firearms during the incident were remanded until 20 August 2005. On 17 August 2005, police, supported by the army, arrested LTTE official Kathiramalai Vaitheehan (alias Gopi, alias Veerapandiyan) at his parents' house in Kaladdy, Kokkuvil in connection with Wijewardena's killing. Two police officers (N. M. Hemage and L. Jeyalath) were injured during the arrest. The LTTE complained to the SLMM that Gopi's arrest violated the 2002 ceasefire agreement.

Colombo magistrate Sarojini Kusala Weerawardene released Gopi on 26 October 2005 after the Attorney General's Department informed the court that there was no evidence against him to file an indictment. None of the witnesses, which included police officers, were able to identify Gopi during the identification parade at Colombo Magistrate's Court on 16 September 2005. Gopi, fearing for his life, requested that the court provide security for him but Weerawardene refused, stating that she did not have the power to do so.

The University Teachers for Human Rights accused Easwaran, the LTTE's political commissar for Nallur, of playing a leading role in the abduction and killing of Wijewardena.

== Reactions ==
President Chandrika Kumaratunga issued a statement on the morning of 5 August 2005 condemning the shooting and ordering the authorities to fully investigate the incident and to bring the perpetrators to justice without delay. She also posthumously promoted Wijewardena to Senior Superintendent of Police. Later that day she issued another statement in which she blamed the two soldiers for the incident, stating that they had contravened military regulations on several counts.

The army claimed that they had photographic evidence to prove that the shooting was an accident and that the gun had misfired. They accused the LTTE of mud slinging and of instigating Wijewardena's killing. The army did, however, admit that the soldiers had broken regulations by going to the barbershop, as hair cutting facilities are provided at army barracks.

Most mainstream Sinhalese media outlets were virtually silent on Shantharubann's killing but, like the military, were quick to blame the LTTE for Wijewardena's killing without providing any evidence. The LTTE denied any involvement.
