= Kokuvil railway station =

Railway station in Kokkuvil, Sri Lanka

Coordinates: 9.7850°N 80.0353°E

Kokuvil கொக்குவில் කොක්කුවිල්

General information
- Location: Kokuvil; Sri Lanka
- System: Sri Lankan Railway Station
- Owner: Sri Lanka Railways
- Line: Northern Line

Other information
- Status: Functioning

History
- Rebuilt: 2 January 2015
Route map
Location

Kokuvil railway station (Tamil: கொக்குவில் தொடருந்து நிலையம் Kokkuvil toṭaruntu nilaiyam) is a railway station in the town of Kokuvil in northern Sri Lanka. Owned by Sri Lanka Railways, the state-owned railway operator, the station is part of the Northern Line which links the north with the capital Colombo. The popular Yarl Devi service calls at the station. The station was not functioning between 1990 and 2015 due to the civil war. The Northern Line between Jaffna and Kankesanthurai was re-opened on 2 January 2015.

== Services ==
The following train services are available from/to the station:

←	Service	→
Kondavil from Chunnakam	4002; Yarl Devi	Jaffna toward Colombo Fort
Jaffna from Colombo Fort	4017; Intercity	Kondavil toward Kankesanthurai
Kondavil from Kankesanthurai	4018; Intercity	Jaffna toward Colombo Fort
Kondavil from Chunnakam	4090; Night Mail	Jaffna toward Colombo Fort
Jaffna	4442; Local	Kondavil toward Kankesanthurai
Kondavil from Kankesanthurai	4882; Local	Jaffna
