= Kondavil railway station =

Railway station in Kondavil, Sri Lanka

Coordinates: 9.7850°N 80.0353°E

Kondavil railway station கோண்டாவில் කොන්ඩාවිල්

General information
- Location: Kondavil; Sri Lanka
- System: Sri Lankan Railway Station
- Owner: Sri Lanka Railways
- Line: Northern Line

Other information
- Status: Functioning

History
- Rebuilt: 2 January 2015
Route map
Location

Kondavil railway station (Tamil: கோண்டாவில் தொடருந்து நிலையம் Kōṇṭāvil toṭaruntu nilaiyam) (Sinhala: කොන්ඩාවේ අඛණ්ඩ දුම්රිය ස්ථානය) is a railway station in the town of Kondavil in northern Sri Lanka. Owned by Sri Lanka Railways, the state-owned railway operator, the station is part of the Northern Line which links the north with the capital Colombo. The popular Yarl Devi service calls at the station. The station was not functioning between 1990 and 2015 due to the civil war. The Northern Line between Jaffna and Kankesanthurai was re-opened on 2 January 2015.

== Services ==
The following train services are available from/to the station:

←	Service	→
Jaffna from Colombo Fort	4001; Yarl Devi	Chunnakam
Inuvil from Chunnakam	4002; Yarl Devi	Kokuvil toward Colombo Fort
Kokuvil from Colombo Fort	4017; Intercity	Inuvil toward Kankesanthurai
Inuvil from Kankesanthurai	4018; Intercity	Kokuvil toward Colombo Fort
Jaffna from Mount Lavinia via Colombo Fort	4021; Intercity (AC)	Chunnakam toward Kankesanthurai
Chunnakam from Kankesanthurai	4022; Intercity (AC)	Jaffna toward Mount Lavinia via Colombo Fort
Jaffna from Colombo Fort	4089; Night Mail	Chunnakam
Inuvil from Chunnakam	4090; Night Mail	Kokuvil toward Colombo Fort
Kokuvil from Jaffna	4442; Local	Inuvil toward Kankesanthurai
Inuvil from Kankesanthurai	4882; Local	Kokuvil toward Jaffna
