= Mankulam railway station =

Railway station in Maankulam, Sri Lanka

Mankulam railway station மாங்குளம் මාන්කුලම් දුම්රිය ස්ථානය

General information
- Location: Mankulam; Sri Lanka
- Coordinates: 9°07′48.10″N 80°26′40.10″E
- System: Sri Lankan Railway Station
- Owner: Sri Lanka Railways
- Line: Northern Line

Other information
- Status: Functioning

History
- Rebuilt: 14 September 2013

Services
Preceding station	Sri Lanka Railways	Following station
Puliyankulam toward Colombo Fort	Yal Devi; Northern Line	Murukandy toward Kankesanthurai
Location

Mankulam railway station (Tamil: மாங்குளம் தொடருந்து நிலையம் Māṅkuḷam toṭaruntu nilaiyam, Sinhala: මාන්කුලම් දුම්රිය ස්ථානය) is a railway station in the town of Mankulam in northern Sri Lanka. Owned by Sri Lanka Railways, the state-owned railway operator, the station is part of the Northern Line which links the north with the capital Colombo. The popular Yarl Devi service calls at the station. The station was not functioning between 1990 and 2013 due to the civil war. The Northern Line between Omanthai and Kilinochchi, which includes Mankulam, was re-opened on 14 September 2013.
