= Inuvil railway station =

Railway station in Sri Lanka

Inuvil இணுவில் ඉනුවිල්

General information
- Location: Inuvil; Sri Lanka
- Coordinates: 9°43′36.20″N 80°01′46.30″E
- System: Sri Lankan Railway Station
- Owner: Sri Lanka Railways
- Line: Northern Line

Other information
- Status: Functioning

History
- Rebuilt: 2 January 2015
Route map
Location

Inuvil railway station (Tamil: இணுவில் தொடருந்து நிலையம் Iṇuvil toṭaruntu nilaiyam) is a railway station in the village of Inuvil in northern Sri Lanka. Owned by Sri Lanka Railways, the state-owned railway operator, the station is part of the Northern Line which links the north with the capital Colombo. The popular Yarl Devi service calls at the station. The station was not functioning between 1990 and 2015 due to the civil war. The Northern Line between Jaffna and Kankesanthurai was re-opened on 2 January 2015.

== Services ==
The following train services are available from/to the station:

←	Service	→
Chunnakam	4002; Yarl Devi	Kondavil toward Colombo Fort
Kondavil from Colombo Fort	4017; Intercity	Chunnakam toward Kankesanthurai
Chunnakam from Kankesanthurai	4018; Intercity	Kondavil toward Colombo Fort
Chunnakam	4090; Night Mail	Kondavil toward Colombo Fort
Kondavil from Jaffna	4442; Local	Chunnakam toward Kankesanthurai
Chunnakam from Kankesanthurai	4882; Local	Kondavil toward Jaffna
