= Mallakam railway station =

Railway station in Mallakam, Sri Lanka

Mallakam railway station மல்லாகம் මල්ලකම් දුම්රිය ස්ථානය

General information
- Location: Mallakam; Sri Lanka
- Coordinates: 9°45′46.50″N 80°01′57.00″E
- System: Sri Lankan Railway Station
- Owner: Sri Lanka Railways
- Line: Northern Line

Other information
- Status: Functioning

History
- Rebuilt: 2 January 2015
Route map
Location

Mallakam railway station (Tamil: மல்லாகம் தொடருந்து நிலையம் Mallākam toṭaruntu nilaiyam, Sinhala: මල්ලකම් දුම්රිය ස්ථානය) is a railway station in the town of Mallakam in northern Sri Lanka. Owned by Sri Lanka Railways, the state-owned railway operator, the station is part of the Northern Line which links the north with the capital Colombo. The station was not functioning between 1990 and 2015 due to the civil war. The Northern Line between Jaffna and Kankesanthurai was re-opened on 2 January 2015.

== Services ==
The following train services are available from/to the station:

←	Service	→
Chunnakam from Colombo Fort	4017; Intercity	Tellippalai toward Kankesanthurai
Tellippalai from Kankesanthurai	4018; Intercity	Chunnakam toward Colombo Fort
Chunnakam from Jaffna	4442; Local	Tellippalai toward Kankesanthurai
Tellippalai from Kankesanthurai	4882; Local	Chunnakam toward Jaffna
