= Puliyankulam railway station =

Railway station in Puliyankulam, Sri Lanka

Puliyankulam railway station புளியங்குளம் පුලියන්කුලම් දුම්රිය ස්ථානය
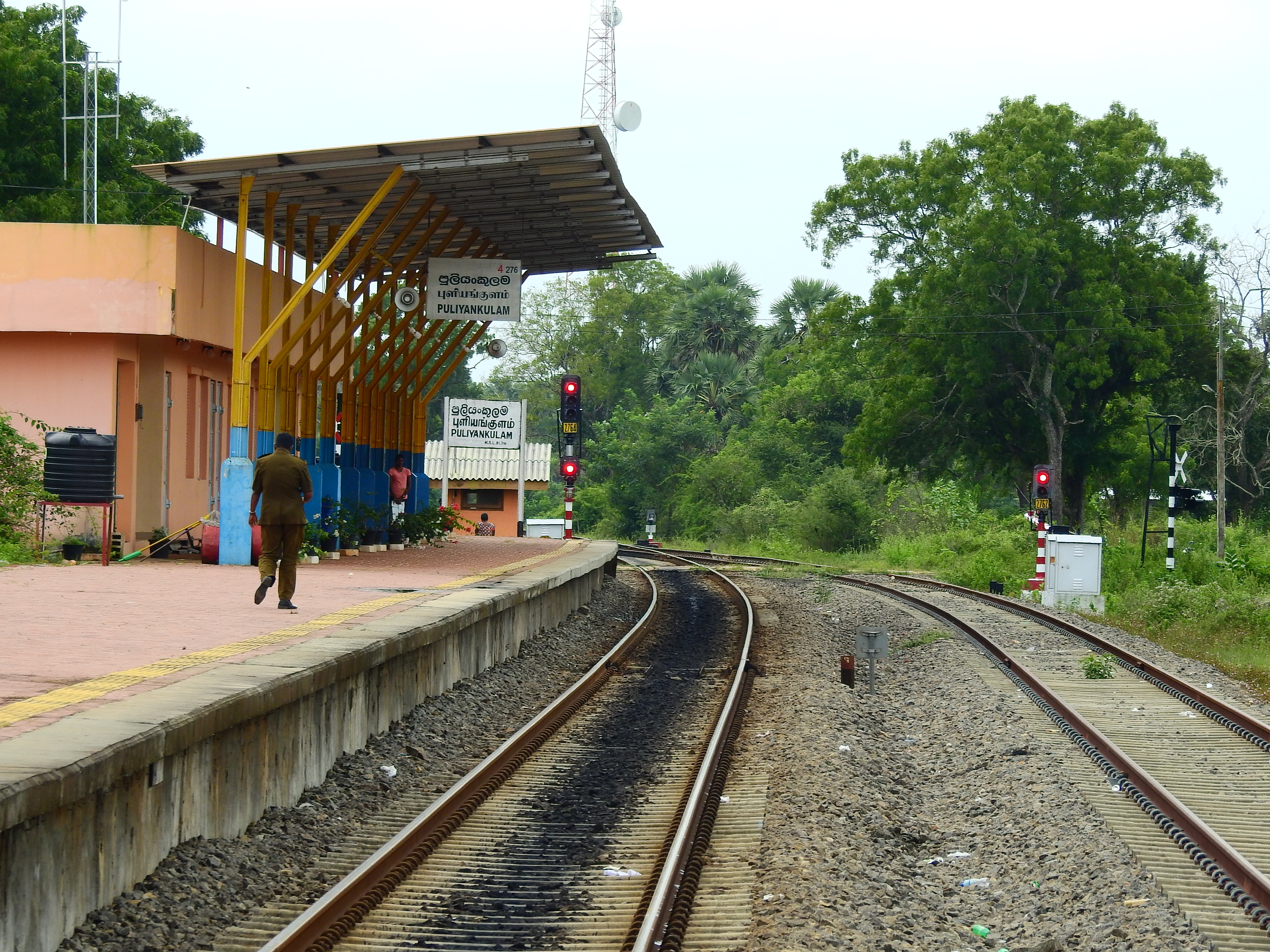
- The station in December 2019

General information
- Location: Puliyankulam; Sri Lanka
- System: Sri Lankan Railway Station
- Owner: Sri Lanka Railways
- Line: Northern Line

Other information
- Status: Functioning

History
- Rebuilt: 14 September 2013

Services
Preceding station	Sri Lanka Railways	Following station
Omanthai toward Colombo Fort	Yal Devi; Northern Line	Mankulam toward Kankesanthurai
Location

Puliyankulam railway station (Tamil: புளியங்குளம் தொடருந்து நிலையம் Puḷiyaṅkuḷam toṭaruntu nilaiyam, Sinhala: පුලියන්කුලම් දුම්රිය ස්ථානය) is a railway station in the town of Puliyankulam in northern Sri Lanka. Owned by Sri Lanka Railways, the state-owned railway operator, the station is part of the Northern Line which links the north with the capital Colombo. The popular Yarl Devi service calls at the station. The station was not functioning between 1990 and 2013 due to the civil war. The Northern Line between Omanthai and Kilinochchi, which includes Puliyankulam, was re-opened on 14 September 2013.
