= Iratperiyakulam railway station =

Railway station in Sri Lanka

Iratperiyakulam railway station ஈரற்பெரியகுளம் ඊරට්පෙරියකුලම් දුම්රිය ස්ථානය

General information
- Location: Iratperiyakulam; Sri Lanka
- Coordinates: 8°42′33.40″N 80°28′50.80″E
- System: Sri Lankan Railway Station
- Owner: Sri Lanka Railways
- Line: Northern Line

Other information
- Status: Functioning

Services
Preceding station	Sri Lanka Railways	Following station
Punewa toward Colombo Fort	Yarl Devi; Northern Line	Vavuniya toward Kankesanthurai
Location

Iratperiyakulam railway station (Tamil: ஈரற்பெரியகுளம் தொடருந்து நிலையம் Īraṟperiyakuḷam toṭaruntu nilaiyam, Sinhala: ඊරට්පෙරියකුලම් දුම්රිය ස්ථානය) is a railway station in the town of Iratperiyakulam in northern Sri Lanka. Owned by Sri Lanka Railways, the state-owned railway operator, the station is part of the Northern Line which links the north with the capital Colombo. The popular Yarl Devi service calls at the station.
