= Anuradhapura railway station =

Railway station in Anuradhapura, Sri Lanka

Coordinates: 8°20′40″N 80°29′39″E

Anuradhapura Railway Station
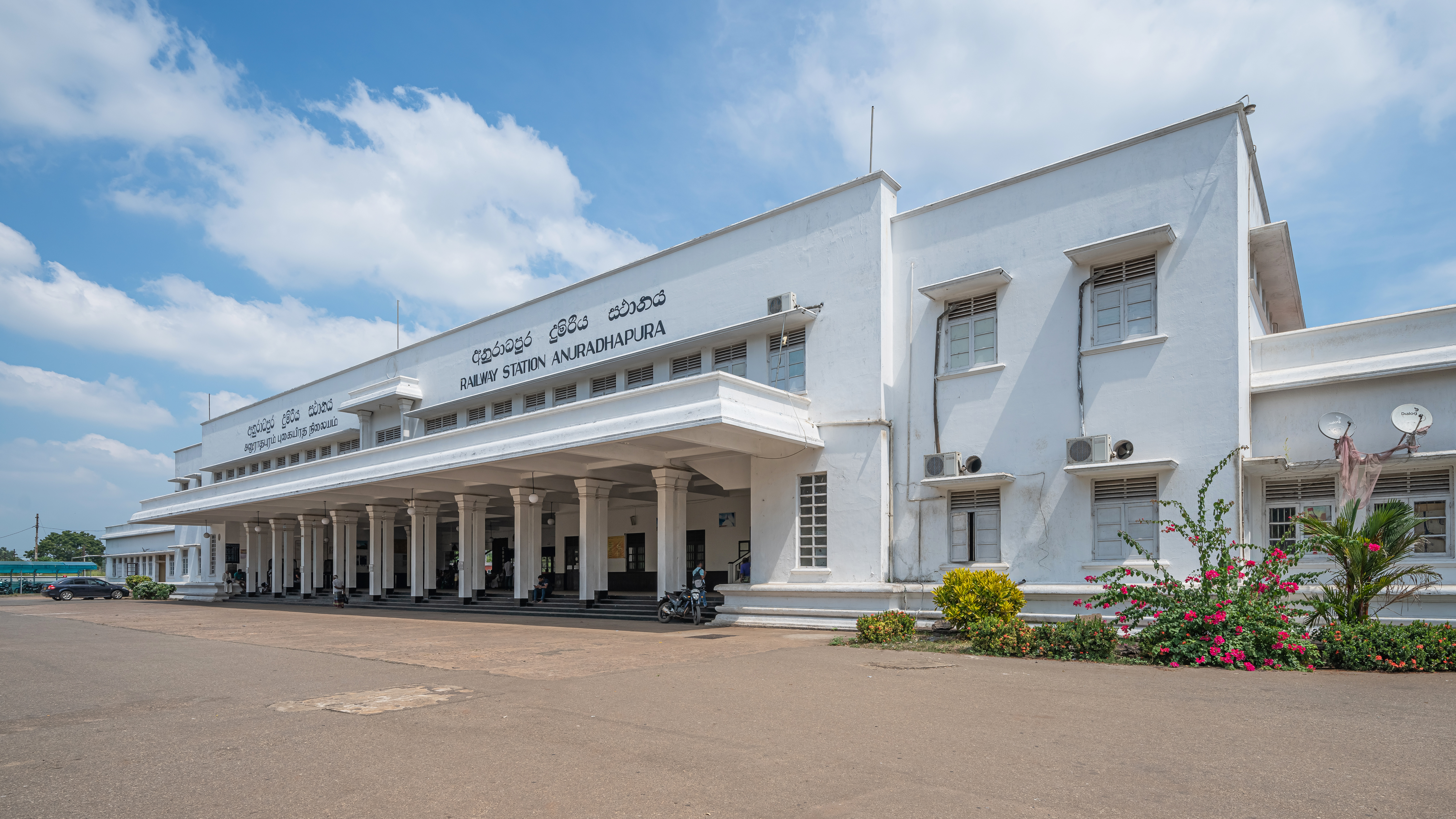
- Front view of the main building

General information
- Owner: Sri Lanka Railways
- Line: Northern Line

History
- Opened: 1903
- Electrified: no

Services
Preceding station	Sri Lanka Railways	Following station
Anuradhapura New Town	Northern Line trains	Saliyapura
Anuradhapura New Town	Mihintale Line trains	Mihintale junction
Location

Anuradhapura Railway Station is a railway station in Anuradhapura, Sri Lanka. The station is served by Sri Lanka Railways, with Northern Line services, such as the Yal Devi, calling at the station.

== History ==
From Polgahawela, the Northern Railway line was opened up to Anuradhapura on 1 November 1904. The construction of the line beyond Anuradhapura, to Medawachchiya, was completed on 11 March 1905.

Yal Devi was operated between Colombo and Kankasanthurei via Jaffna; (temporarily only up to Jaffna)

== Services ==
Northern Line trains serve Anuradhapura. Trains connect Colombo with Vavuniya, via Anuradhapura.

The railways operate a short branch line at Anuradhapura to Mihintale via Mihintale Jn.

== See also ==
- Railway stations in Sri Lanka
- Sri Lanka Railways
- List of railway stations by line order in Sri Lanka
