= Tellippalai railway station =

Railway station in Tellippalai, Sri Lanka

Tellippalai தெல்லிப்பழை ථෙල්ලිප්පල
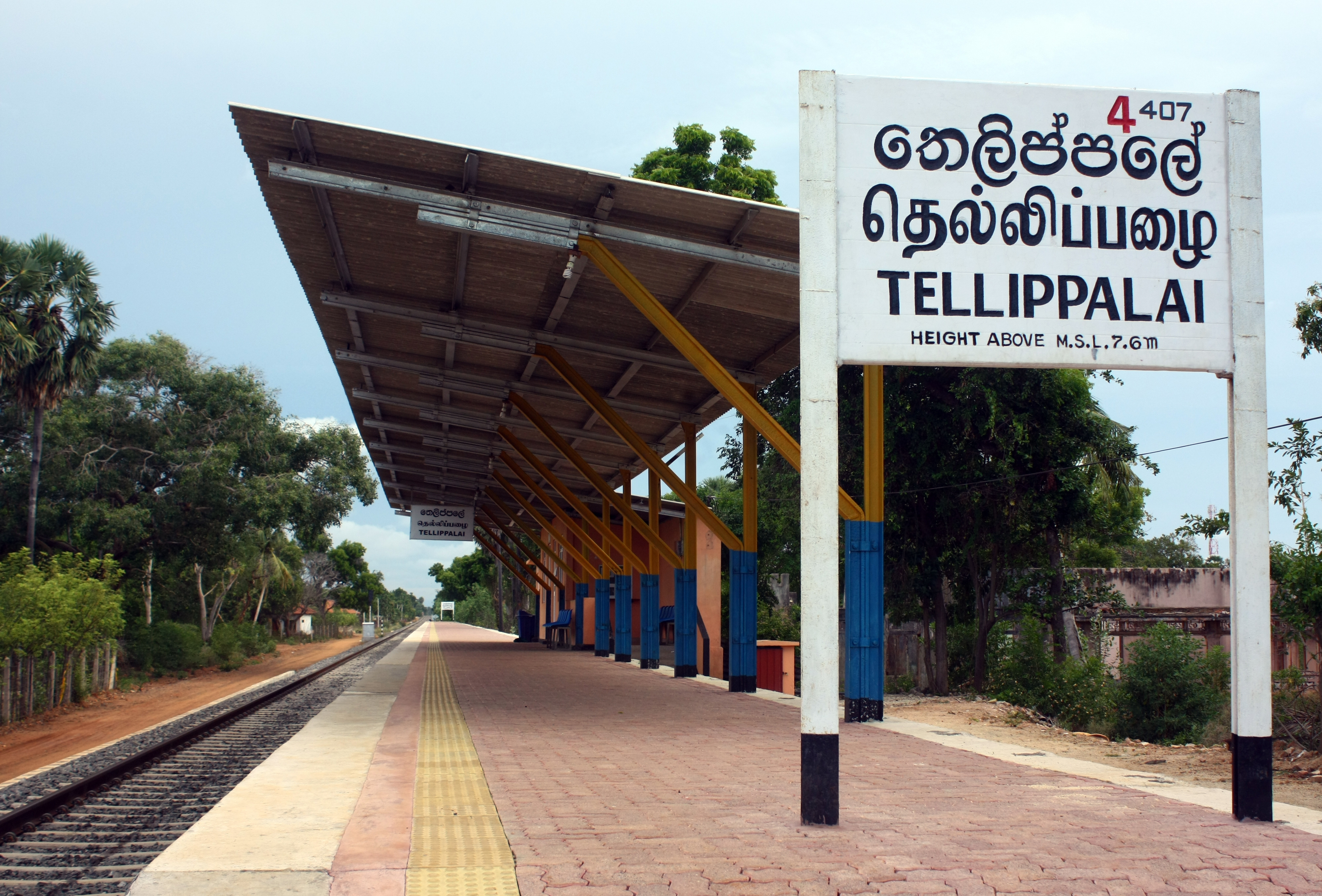

General information
- Location: Tellippalai; Sri Lanka
- Coordinates: 9°47′06.00″N 80°02′07.00″E
- System: Sri Lankan Railway Station
- Owner: Sri Lanka Railways
- Line: Northern Line

Other information
- Status: Functioning

History
- Rebuilt: 2 January 2015
Route map
Location

Tellippalai railway station (Tamil: தெல்லிப்பழை தொடருந்து நிலையம் Tellippaḻai toṭaruntu nilaiyam) is a railway station in the town of Tellippalai in northern Sri Lanka. Owned by Sri Lanka Railways, the state-owned railway operator, the station is part of the Northern Line which links the north with the capital Colombo. The station was not functioning between 1990 and 2015 due to the civil war. The Northern Line between Jaffna and Kankesanthurai was re-opened on 2 January 2015.

== Services ==
The following train services are available from/to the station:

←	Service	→
Mallakam from Colombo Fort	4017; Intercity	Maviddapuram toward Kankesanthurai
Maviddapuram from Kankesanthurai	4018; Intercity	Mallakam toward Colombo Fort
Mallakam from Jaffna	4442; Local	Maviddapuram toward Kankesanthurai
Maviddapuram from Kankesanthurai	4882; Local	Mallakam toward Jaffna
