= Maviddapuram railway station =

Railway station in Sri Lanka

Maviddapuram railway station மாவிட்டபுரம் මාවිදපුරම් දුම්රිය ස්ථානය

General information
- Location: Maviddapuram; Sri Lanka
- System: Sri Lankan Railway Station
- Owner: Sri Lanka Railways
- Line: Northern Line

Other information
- Status: Functioning

History
- Rebuilt: 2 January 2015
Route map
Location

Maviddapuram railway station (Tamil: மாவிட்டபுரம் தொடருந்து நிலையம் Māviṭṭapuram toṭaruntu nilaiyam, Sinhala: මාවිදපුරම් දුම්රිය ස්ථානය) is a railway station in the village of Maviddapuram in northern Sri Lanka. Owned by Sri Lanka Railways, the state-owned railway operator, the station is part of the Northern Line which links the north with the capital Colombo. The station was not functioning between 1990 and 2015 due to the civil war. The Northern Line between Jaffna and Kankesanthurai was re-opened on 2 January 2015.

== Services ==
The following train services are available from/to the station:

←	Service	→
Tellippalai from Colombo Fort	4017; Intercity	Kankesanthurai
Kankesanthurai	4018; Intercity	Tellippalai toward Colombo Fort
Tellippalai from Jaffna	4442; Local	Kankesanthurai
Kankesanthurai	4882; Local	Tellippalai toward Jaffna
