= Chunnakam market massacre =

1984 massacre of civilians in Sri Lanka

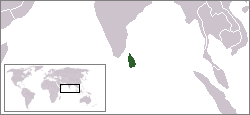
- Location of Sri Lanka
- Location: Chunnakam, Northern Province, Sri Lanka
- Date: March 28, 1984 (+8 GMT)
- Target: Sri Lankan Tamil Civilians
- Deaths: 9
- Injuries: 100+
- Perpetrator: Sri Lankan military

The Chunnakam market massacre was a massacre of Sri Lankan Tamil civilians by the Sri Lankan military in Chunnakam, a suburb of Jaffna in the Northern Province, Sri Lanka, in 1984. This was the second such massacre carried out in the town, during the same year after 20 Tamil youth were massacred by the Sri Lankan military at the local Police station just two months earlier.

== Massacre ==
The Chunnakam market, one of the busiest in the island's north is situated 7 km from Jaffna town on the Kankesanturai road. This is a central market, where agricultural produce grown in the districts of Jaffna, Kilinochchi etc. would be brought for sale.

On 28 March 1984, personnel belonging to the Sri Lankan military arrived at the market and the town's bus stop in tanks and jeeps and opened fire at the crowd in both these places. Eight civilians were shot dead, and over 50 were injured. The military then proceeded to set fire to the market and burnt down all of the shops contained within it.

The military then left the location, and drove through Mallakam and Tellipalai along the Kankesanturai road. Here, they started shooting at everyone, who came within their sight. At least one civilian was killed, and female students in Tellipalai, who were returning home from school after completing their examinations were assaulted. Consequently, 26 students were injured. And another than 20 civilians belonging to these two villages were also injured.

== See also ==
- List of attacks on civilians attributed to Sri Lankan government forces
