= Chunnakam railway station =

Railway station in Chunnakam, Sri Lanka

Chunnakam சுன்னாகம் චුන්නාකම්

General information
- Location: Chunnakam; Sri Lanka
- Coordinates: 9°44′45.30″N 80°02′00.00″E
- System: Sri Lankan Railway Station
- Owner: Sri Lanka Railways
- Line: Northern Line

Other information
- Status: Functioning

History
- Rebuilt: 2 January 2015
Route map
Location

Chunnakam railway station (Tamil: சுன்னாகம் தொடருந்து நிலையம் Cuṉṉākam toṭaruntu nilaiyam) is a railway station in the town of Chunnakam in northern Sri Lanka. Owned by Sri Lanka Railways, the state-owned railway operator, the station is part of the Northern Line which links the north with the capital Colombo. The popular Yarl Devi service calls at the station. The station was not functioning between 1990 and 2015 due to the civil war. The Northern Line between Jaffna and Kankesanthurai was re-opened on 2 January 2015.

== Services ==
The following train services are available from/to the station:

←	Service	→
Kondavil from Colombo Fort	4001; Yarl Devi	Terminus
Terminus	4002; Yarl Devi	Inuvil toward Colombo Fort
Inuvil from Colombo Fort	4017; Intercity	Mallakam toward Kankesanthurai
Mallakam from Kankesanthurai	4018; Intercity	Inuvil toward Colombo Fort
Kondavil from Mount Lavinia via Colombo Fort	4021; Intercity (AC)	Kankesanthurai
Kankesanthurai	4022; Intercity (AC)	Kondavil toward Mount Lavinia via Colombo Fort
Kondavil from Colombo Fort	4089; Night Mail	Terminus
Terminus	4090; Night Mail	Inuvil toward Colombo Fort
Inuvil from Jaffna	4442; Local	Mallakam toward Kankesanthurai
Mallakam from Kankesanthurai	4882; Local	Inuvil toward Jaffna
