= Thandikulam railway station =

Railway station in Sri Lanka

Thandikulam railway station தாண்டிக்குளம் තන්දිකුලම් දුම්රිය ස්ථානය

General information
- Location: Thandikulam; Sri Lanka
- Coordinates: 8°46′41.90″N 80°29′05.80″E
- System: Sri Lankan Railway Station
- Owner: Sri Lanka Railways
- Line: Northern Line

Other information
- Status: Functioning

History
- Rebuilt: 6 June 2009

Services
Preceding station	Sri Lanka Railways	Following station
Vavuniya toward Colombo Fort	Yarl Devi; Northern Line	Omanthai toward Kankesanthurai
Location

Thandikulam railway station (Tamil: தாண்டிக்குளம் தொடருந்து நிலையம் Tāṇṭikkuḷam toṭaruntu nilaiyam, Sinhala: තන්දිකුලම් දුම්රිය ස්ථානය) is a railway station in the town of Thandikulam in northern Sri Lanka. Owned by Sri Lanka Railways, the state-owned railway operator, the station is part of the Northern Line which links the north with the capital Colombo. The popular Yarl Devi service calls at the station. The station was not functioning between 1990 and 2009 due to the civil war. It was re-opened on 6 June 2009.
