= Omanthai railway station =

Railway station in Omanthai, Sri Lanka

Omanthai railway station ஓமந்தை ඕමන්ත දුම්රිය ස්ථානය
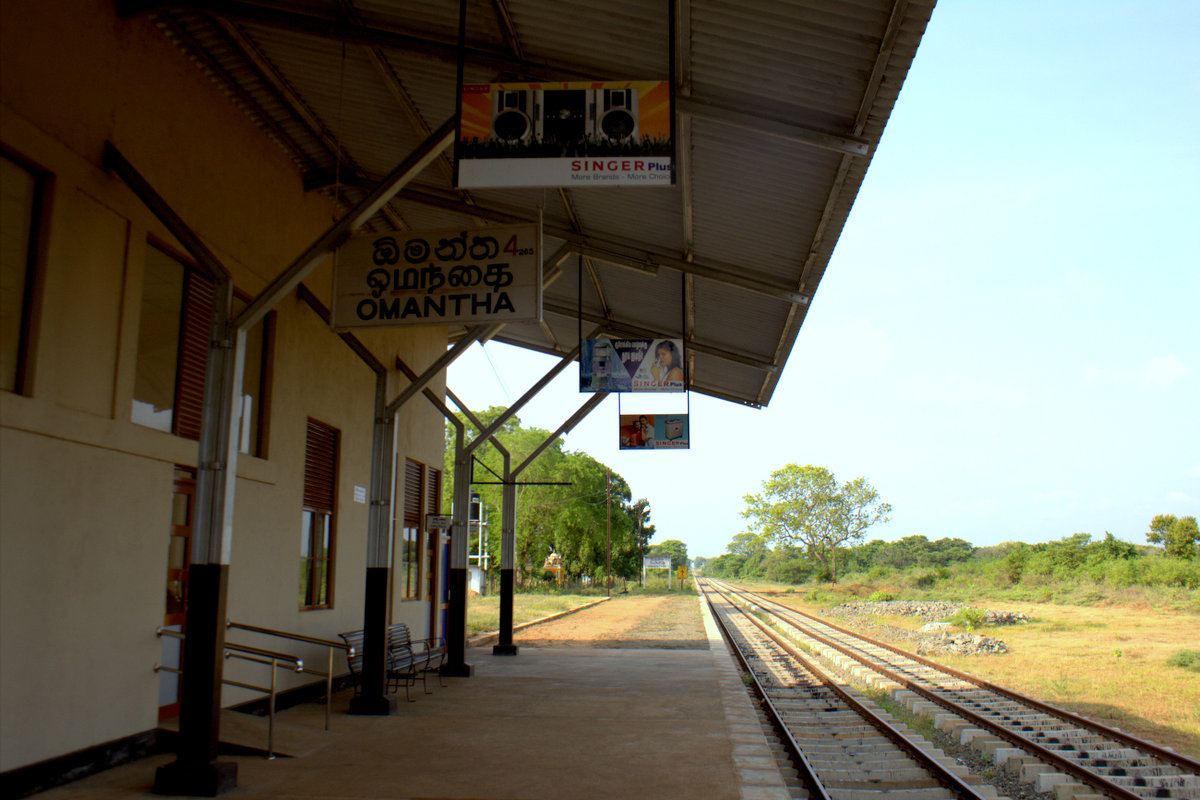

General information
- Location: Omanthai; Sri Lanka
- Coordinates: 8°52′13.80″N 80°30′03.50″E
- System: Sri Lankan Railway Station
- Owner: Sri Lanka Railways
- Line: Northern Line

Other information
- Status: Functioning

History
- Rebuilt: 27 May 2011

Services
Preceding station	Sri Lanka Railways	Following station
Thandikulam toward Colombo Fort	Yarl Devi; Northern Line	Puliyankulam toward Kankesanthurai
Location

Omanthai railway station (Tamil: ஓமந்தை தொடருந்து நிலையம் Ōmantai toṭaruntu nilaiyam, Sinhala: ඕමන්ත දුම්රිය ස්ථානය) is a railway station in the town of Omanthai in northern Sri Lanka. Owned by Sri Lanka Railways, the state-owned railway operator, the station is part of the Northern Line which links the north with the capital city Colombo. The popular Yarl Devi service calls at the station. The station was not operating between 1990 and 2009 due to the civil war. It was re-opened on 27 May 2011.
