= Vavuniya railway station =

Railway station in Vavuniya, Sri Lanka

Vavuniya வவுனியா වවුනියා
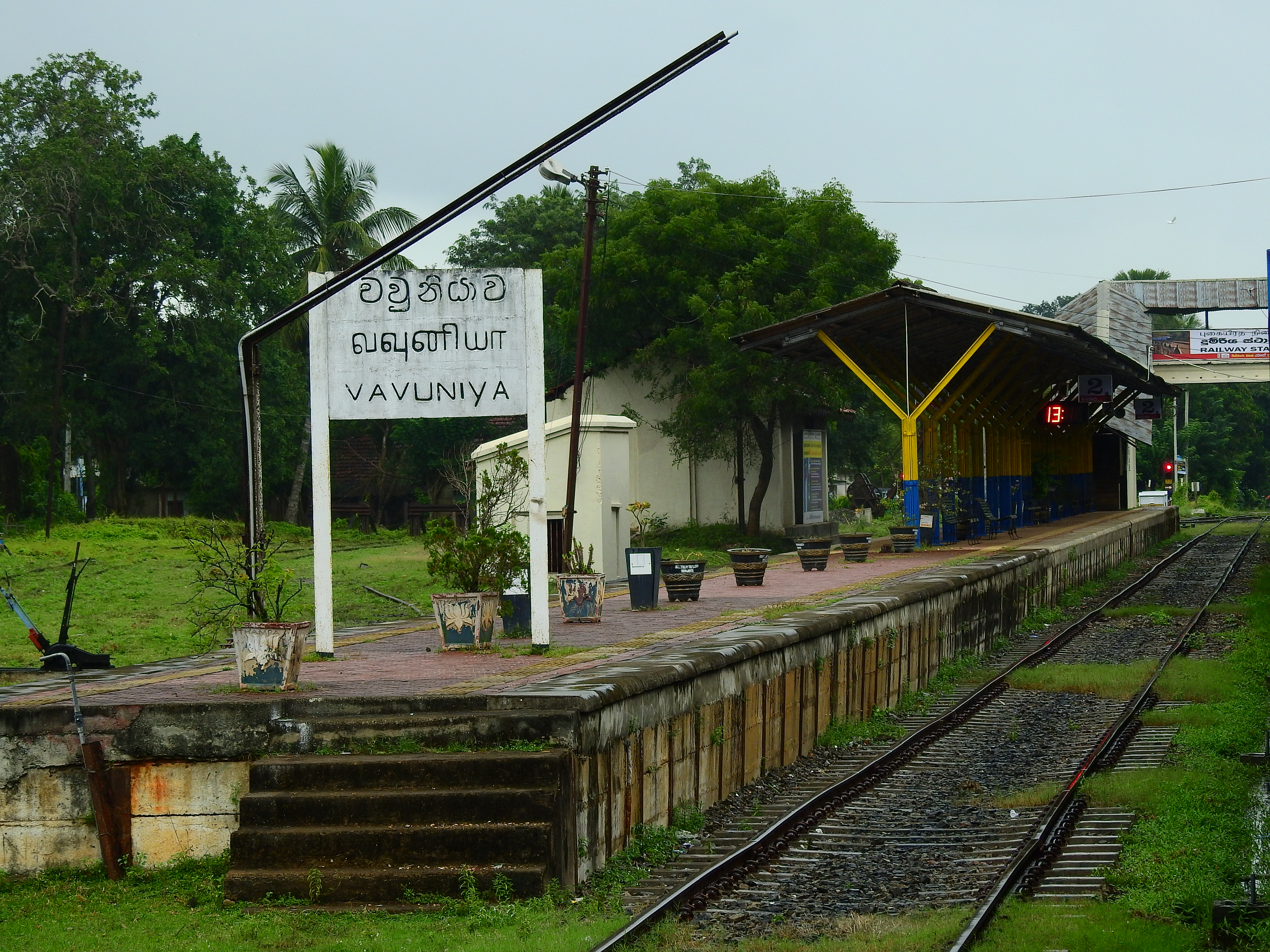

General information
- Location: Vavuniya; Sri Lanka
- Coordinates: 8°45′15.40″N 80°29′37.60″E
- System: Sri Lankan Railway Station
- Owner: Sri Lanka Railways
- Line: Northern Line

Other information
- Status: Functioning

Services
Preceding station	Sri Lanka Railways	Following station
Iratperiyakulam toward Colombo Fort	Yal Devi; Northern Line	Thandikulam toward Kankesanthurai
Location
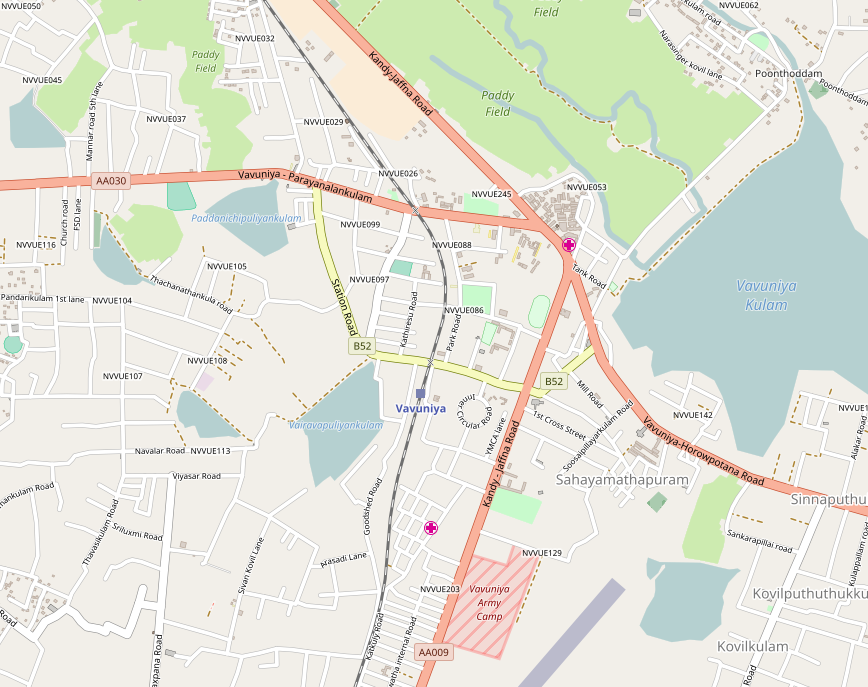
- Location within Central Vavuniya

Vavuniya railway station (Tamil: வவுனியா தொடருந்து நிலையம் Vavuṉiyā toṭaruntu nilaiyam) is a railway station in the city of Vavuniya in northern Sri Lanka. Owned by Sri Lanka Railways, the state-owned railway operator, the station is part of the Northern Line which links the north with the capital Colombo. The popular Yarl Devi service calls at the station and the also popular service Rajarata Rejini terminates at the station, which starts at Matara in down south. No services operated north of Vavuniya after 1990 due to the civil war. Reconstruction of this section of the line commenced following the end of the civil war in 2009. Currently services operate up to KKS.
