= Chunnakam Police station massacre =

1984 massacre of civilians in Sri Lanka

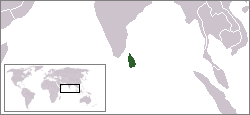
- Location of Sri Lanka
- Location: Chunnakam, Northern Province, Sri Lanka
- Date: 8 January 1984 (+8 GMT)
- Target: Sri Lankan Tamil Civilians
- Deaths: At least 19
- Injuries: Unknown
- Perpetrator: Sri Lankan Police

The Chunnakam Police station massacre refers to the killing of 19 ethnic Tamil civilians by the Sri Lankan Police, at Chunnakam, a suburb of Jaffna in 1984. This was among the first of the series of massacres of Tamil civilians by the Sri Lankan state forces, since the outbreak of the Sri Lankan Civil War.

== Massacre ==
Chunnakam is situated in the Uduvil Assistant Government Agent Division in the Jaffna District. Ten kilometers from the Jaffna town, on the Kankesanthurai road, there is the Chunnakam Junction situated. The Chunnakam Police station was located about 250 metres south of this junction.

Many Tamil youth had been previously arrested since the escalation of conflict between the Army and the Tamil groups in the Jaffna Peninsula. Almost all of them were arrested under the draconian Prevention of Terrorism Act (POTA) without evidence and were kept in various government buildings in the region.

On 8 January 1984, the State Police placed a time bomb in the Chunnakam Police station where at least 19 Tamil youth were held under the POTA and left the building. When the bomb exploded, all of them inside were killed. One man who attempted to rescue his friends inside also lost his life.

== See also ==
- Chunnakam market massacre, another massacre of local Tamils which occurred in the same town, two months later.
- List of attacks on civilians attributed to Sri Lankan government forces

== Sources ==
- THE NORTHEAST SECRETARIAT ON HUMAN RIGHTS (NESOHR). Massacres of Tamils (1956-2008)p. 14–15. Chennai: Manitham Publishers, 2009. ISBN 978-81-909737-0-0
