= Maviddapuram =

Maviddapuram மாவிட்டபுரம் මාවිට්ටපුරම්
- Village
- Location within Northern Province
- Coordinates: 9°48′0″N 80°02′0″E
- Country: Sri Lanka
- Province: Northern
- District: Jaffna
- DS Division: Valikamam North

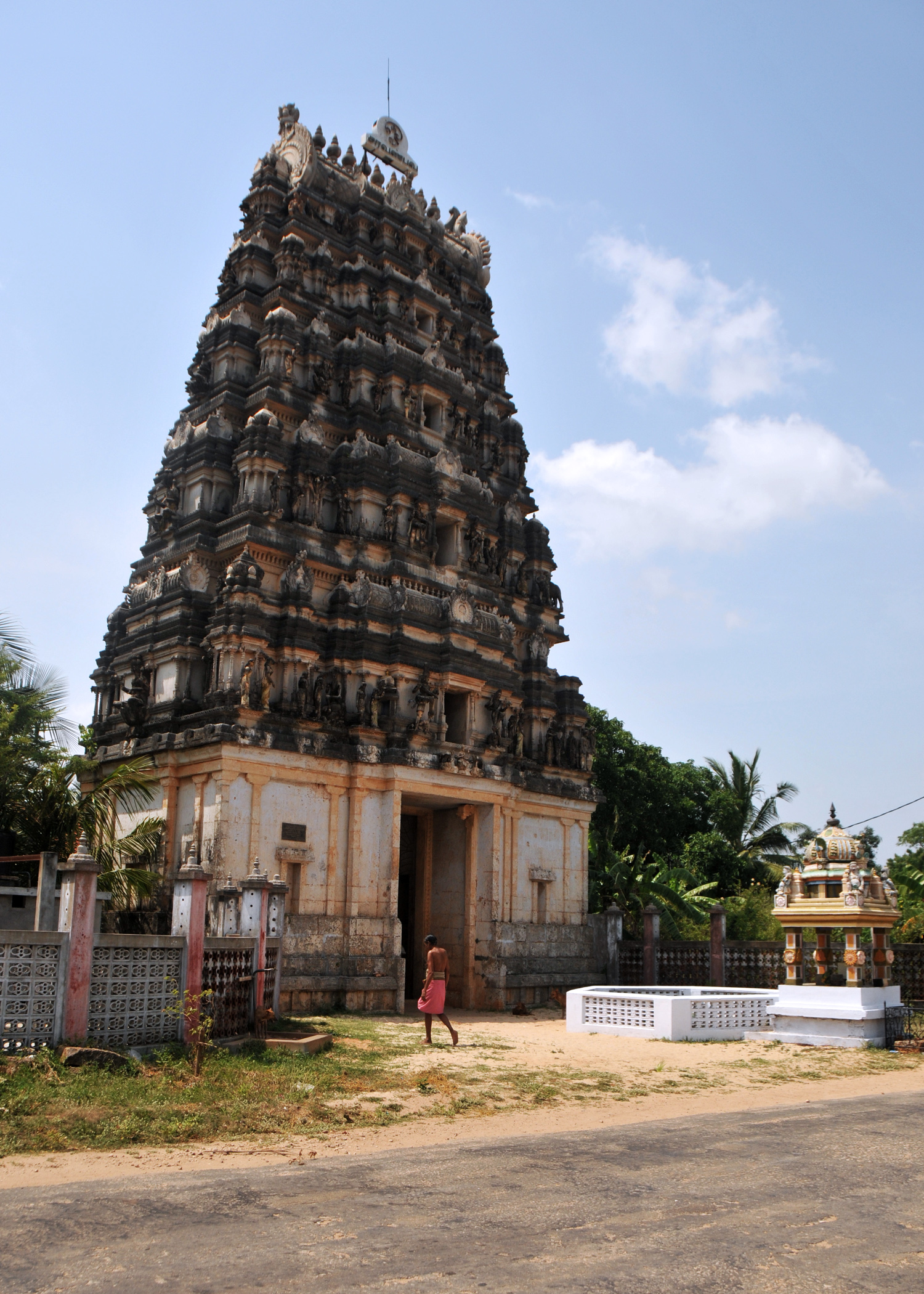
Maviddapuram Kandaswamy temple

Maviddapuram (Tamil: மாவிட்டபுரம், romanized: Māviṭṭapuram) is a village in the Sri Lankan district of Jaffna under the Tellippalai divisional secretariat.

== Etymology ==
The name Maviddapuram is derived from: மா, romanized: Mā, lit. 'Horse', vidda (removed) from: விட்ட, romanized: Viṭṭa, lit. 'Let go or removed' and: புரம், romanized: Puram, lit. 'Holy city'.

== History ==
According to legend Maviddapuram has had a Hindu shrine for 5,000 years. According to another legend, an 8th-century Chola (Note: Another source states that the princess was Pandyan.) princess Mathurapuraveeravalli, (Note: Also Maruthapuraveegavalli, Marutappiravikavalli.) daughter of Tissai Ughra Cholan, the King of Madurai, was inflicted with a persistent intestinal disorder as well as facial disfigurement which made her face look like a horse. She was advised by a priest/sage to bathe in the freshwater spring at Keerimalai. After bathing in the spring Mathurapuraveeravalli's illness and disfigurement vanished. In gratitude, she renovated a Hindu shrine, located in Kovil Kadavai about two kilometers south east of the spring, into a full temple honouring the Hindu god Murugan (Skanda). The King of Madurai sent sculptors, artists, building material, granite, statues, gold, silver etc. to assist with the renovation. The temple's statue of Kankesan (Murugan) was brought via the port of Gayathurai which was later renamed Kankesanthurai.

== Agriculture and Industries ==
Before 1990, Maviddapuram had a cement factory which was one of the major producers of cement in Sri Lanka.

== Transport ==
- Maviddapuram railway station
