= Inuvil =

Inuvil இணுவில் ඉනුවිල්
- Village
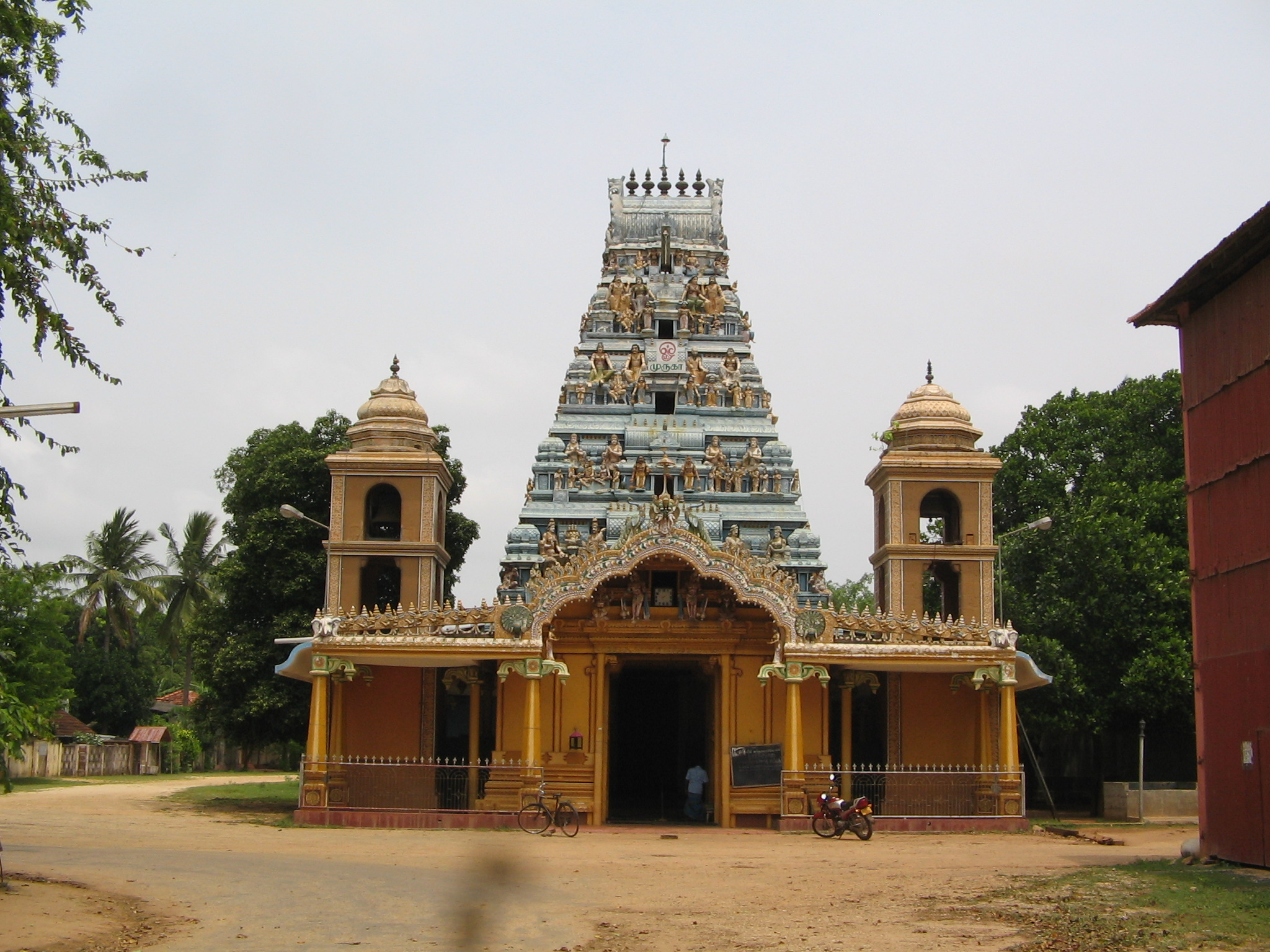
- Kandaswamy Temple, Inuvil

- Location within Northern Province
- Coordinates: 9°43′0″N 80°01′0″E
- Country: Sri Lanka
- Province: Northern
- District: Jaffna
- DS Division: Valikamam South

Inuvil is a town in the Northern Province of Sri Lanka, about 5 miles north of the city of Jaffna. It is located on the Jaffna-Kangesanthurai road. This road divides the town into two parts East Inuvil and West Inuvil. Inuvil is bordered by Uduvil to the north, Urumbarai to the east, Kondavil to the south, and Sudumala to the west. The town is known for its tobacco production, full of small plantations for agriculture.

McLeod Hospital, a maternity hospital established by the American Mission, is the most famous. Until a few decades ago, people from many parts of the peninsula flocked to this clinic.

== People ==
The town and the surrounding area have traditionally been populated by farmers. However, many have educated their children to be professionals. There are several people who have started their own business as well. The majority of the people are Tamils. The first revolutionary group (EROS) Eelam Revolutionary Organisation of Students formed by Eliyathamby Ratnasabapathy is from Inuvil.

Many residents have immigrated to Western countries. The Inuvil diaspora is present in Canada, England, France, Germany, Switzerland, United States, Australia, Norway.

== Education ==
- Inuvil Central College
- Inuvil Hindu College
- Inuvil Ramanathan College
- Faculty of Fine Arts, University of Jaffna
- Inuvil Public Library
- Inuvil Arivalayam
- Inuvil Central College Primary School
- Inuvil Ilanthondar Sabai

== Culture ==
Most of them are Hindus Around 98–99% and follow Tamil Culture. There are many professional drummers who came from this village including famous Thadshanamoorthy. There is also a "Gurukulam" where most of the Hindu priests are educated here.

== Famous Hindu temples ==
In the village of Inuvil, there are many temples. There are a few huge historical Tamil kingdom-era temples. These are still being well maintained by the people. The large temples in Inuvil are:

- Inuvai Pararajasekara pillaiyaar kovil
- Inuvai Kanthaswamy Kovil
- Inuvai Sivakami amman kovil
- Inuvai Karaikal sivan kovil
- Inuvil Segarajasekarap Pilliar Kovil
- Inuvil Manchathdy Murugan Kovil

== Transport ==
- Inuvil Railway Station
