= Chunnakam =

Chunnakam சுன்னாகம் චුන්නාකම්
- Town
- Location within Northern Province
- Coordinates: 9°45′0″N 80°01′0″E
- Country: Sri Lanka
- Province: Northern
- District: Jaffna
- DS Division: Valikamam South

Chunnakam (Tamil: சுன்னாகம், romanized: Cuṉṉākam; Sinhala: චුන්නාකම්, romanized: Chunnakam) is a town, located 9.7 km (6.0 mi) north of Jaffna. It is one of the important commercial centres in Jaffna. The original name of the town was Mayilani. In northern Sri Lanka, Chunnakam is only second to Jaffna in terms of population density and commercial activities in and around its neighbourhoods.

== Etymology ==
According to Tamil scholars, Chunnakam derived from two Tamil words, "Chunnam+Gramam", "Chunnam" means limestone and "Gramam" means village, limestone is widely found in the nearby areas. One of the great Sri Lankan Tamil poets, Muthukumara Kavirayar gave a new definition to its name in his poem beginning as முடிவிலாதுறை சுன்னாகத்தான் வழி ... , from which, scholars believe that the rising Sun from the East reflecting on the temple of Shiva located on the present day station road, has the impression of seeing a shiny mountain, which is presumably the Heaven, the home of Shiva made him to inspire for the poem mentioned above here, சுன்னாகம் can be divided into two parts of nouns as சுல் + நாகம் = சுன்னாகம், where சுல் means silver and நாகம் means mountain giving the compound noun the meaning as "Shiny Mountain"

It was once suggested that the name Chunnakam was the equivalent of Pali name Cunnagãma (Sinhala: Hunugama). But later suggested that the name may be the Tamil equivalent of the Sinhala name Sulunãgama (Pali: Cullanãgagãma).

== History ==
Historically in the recent centuries Chunnakam has been an area dominated mostly by Sri Lankan Tamils and up until the 1980s there was a small Sinhalese population from the south along with Indian Tamils, Moors, and other South Indian Non-Tamils such as Malayalis lived in Chunnakam area. This ethnic diversity among its residents gave Chunnakam a characteristic of a major city.

== Location ==
Chunnakam is about 5 miles^{2} in area as it has Punnalaikkadduvan on its East, Uduvil to its South, Sandilipay to its West and Mallakam to its north as bordering villages. Chunnakam has population of about 60,000.

== Transport ==
- Chunnakam railway station

== Politics ==
Currently Chunnakam is governed by Valikamam South Divisional Council.
Unlike other places in Northern Sri Lanka, people of Chunnakam also adapted to diversive political beliefs. During the days of Town Council era, residents always preferred candidates from LSSP to Federal party or Tamil congress and in the 1982 presidential election, the then JVP leader Rohana Wijeweera collected majority votes within Manipay constituency from the two poll booths in Chunnakam only.

There was even a popular rumor about Mr. Wijeweera being kept in a secret place in Chunnakam when he was wanted by the Sri Lankan government following the infamous uprising by his men in the late 80's. However, that turned out to be untrue as he was captured in a place in the central province.

== Places of worship ==
There are quite a few worship places within the town limits of Chunnakam.

=== Hindu temples ===
- Sri Kathiramalai Sivan Devasthanam (established by Tamil King UkiraRajasinkan)
- Mayilani Annamaar (Annamageswarar) Temple
- Viswanatha Swamy Temple (Mayilani Sivan Temple)
- Mayilani Kanthaswamy Temple
- Mayilani Muthumary Amman (Vadali Amman) Temple
- Soolanai Gnana Vairavar Temple
- Soolanai Muthumary Amman Temple
- Paruthikalati Gnana Vairavar Temple
- Chunnakam Thalaiyadi Harihara Puthira Iyanar Temple
- Chunnakam Santhirasekara Pillaiyar Temple
- Varushapulam Mahamary Amman Temple
- Chunnakam East Oorisaaddy Sivapootharayar Temple (சுன்னாகம் கிழக்கு ஊரிசாட்டி சிவபூதராஜர் தேவஸ்தானம்)
- Chunnakam Bhuvaneswary Amman Temple (Muthukrishnar Lane)
- Chunnakam South Sivapootharayar Temple
- Chunnakam East Gnana Vairavar Temple
- Ampanai Gnanavairavar Temple
- Ampanai Kali Temple
- Ampanai Nagakanni Temple
- Soorawathai Muthumariamman Kovil

=== Christian churches ===
- St. Antony's Parish Catholic Church (Chunnakam)
- St. Mary's Catholic Church (Erlalai)
- St. Mary's Catholic Church (Uduvil)

== Colleges and schools ==
- Ramanathan Academy of Fine Arts - University of Jaffna
- Ramanathan College, Maruthanarmadam
- Mayilani Saiva Vidyalayam (middle school)
- Nakeswari Vidyasalai (primary school)
- Roman Catholic Mixed School (primary school)
- St. Antony's Kindergarten (operated by St. Antony's Parish)

== Notable persons ==
- Kumaraswamy Pulavar - scholar, poet
- Vetharniam - The founder of Chunnakam
- V. Dharmalingam - Former Member of Parliament, Former Chairman of Uduvil Village Council
- Ponnambalam Nagalingam - Former Chairman of Chunnakam Town Council in the 1960s & Former Senator - Lanka Sama Samaja Party (LSSP)
- D. Siddarthan - Member of Parliament, Leader of the People's Liberation Organisation of Tamil Eelam (PLOTE)
- Paikiasothy Saravanamuttu - Paternal grandson of Vetharniam, The founder of Chunnakam
- Sabdharatnajyoti Saravanamuttu - Paternal grandson of Vetharniam, The founder of Chunnakam
- Ratnasothy Saravanamuttu - Paternal grandson of Vetharniam, The founder of Chunnakam
- Manicasothy Saravanamuttu - Paternal grandson of Vetharniam, The founder of Chunnakam
