= Valikamam South Divisional Council =

Local authority in Sri Lanka

Valikamam South Divisional Council வலிகாமம் தெற்கு பிரதேச சபை

Type
- Type: Local authority

Leadership
- Chairman: Thiyakarasa Piragash, TNA since July 2011
- Deputy Chairman: Rasiah Parameswaralingam, TNA since July 2011
- Seats: 16

Elections
- Last election: 2011 Sri Lankan local government elections

Valikamam South Divisional Council (Tamil: வலிகாமம் தெற்கு பிரதேச சபை Valikāmam Teṟku Piratēca Capai; VSDC) is the local authority for Valikamam South DS Division in northern Sri Lanka. VSDC is responsible for providing a variety of local public services including roads, sanitation, drains, housing, libraries, public parks and recreational facilities. It has 16 members elected using the open list proportional representation system.

== History ==
In 1987 there was a major re-organisation of local government in Sri Lanka. District Development Councils were abolished and replaced by Divisional Councils (Pradeshiya Sabha or Pradesha Sabhai). The Pradeshiya Sabha Act No. 15 of 1987 was passed by Parliament on 15 April 1987 and on 1 January 1988 257 Divisional Councils started functioning. The Divisional Councils were generally commensurate with their namesake Divisional Secretary's Divisions. Valikamam South Divisional Council was established as the local authority for the Valikamam South DS Division. However, according to the pro-LTTE TamilNet, the Sri Lankan government had suspended all local government in the north and east of the country in 1983 using emergency regulations. The civil war prevented elections from being held for VSDC until 1998 as the LTTE did not hold elections when it controlled the area.

In March 1994 elections were held in the east and in Vavuniya in the north. However, elections weren't held in other areas of the north, including the Jaffna Peninsula, because most of these areas were at that time controlled by the rebel Tamil Tigers. In August 1995 the Sri Lankan military launched an offensive to recapture the Jaffna Peninsula. By December 1995 the military had captured most of the Valikamam region of the peninsula, including the city of Jaffna. By 16 May 1996 the military had recaptured the entire peninsula. In late 1996 the government announced elections would be held for 23 local authorities in Jaffna District, Kilinochchi District, Mannar District and Vavuniya District but following opposition from Tamil political parties postponed them. On 3 December 1997 the government announced that elections would be held for the 17 local authorities on the Jaffna Peninsula. The Tamil political parties were still opposed to holding elections as "normalcy" hadn't returned to the peninsula. The peninsula was under the firm grip of the Sri Lankan military and civil government had little, if any, role in the administration of the peninsula. The Tamil Tigers were also firmly against the elections being held. Despite these objections the elections were held on 29 January 1998.

== Election results ==
=== 1998 local government election ===
Results of the local government election held on 29 January 1998:

Alliances and parties	Votes	%	Seats
Eelam People's Democratic Party	3,542	45.31%	8
Democratic People's Liberation Front (PLOTE)	2,659	34.01%	5
Eelam People's Revolutionary Liberation Front	1,121	14.34%	2
Tamil Eelam Liberation Organization	496	6.34%	1
Valid Votes	7,818	100.00%	16
Rejected Votes	939		
Total Polled	8,757		
Registered Electors	41,444		
Turnout	21.13%		

On 1 January 2002 local authority elections were called for the entire country. It was later announced that elections would be held on 25 March 2002 in the north and east, and on 20 March 2002 in the rest of the country. The normal life term of Sri Lankan local government bodies is four years. The life term of VSDC expired in February 2002 but the central government extended this by another year, as the law allows. On 21 March 2002 the Election Commissioner announced that the elections in the north and east, except for eight local authorities in Ampara District, had been postponed until 25 September 2002. On 17 September 2002 elections in the north and east were postponed, for a second time, until 25 June 2003. Elections should have been held when the extension expired in February 2003 but in January 2003, following a request from the Tamil National Alliance, the central government instead dissolved VSDC using emergency powers and instead put in place special commissioners to administer the local area. In June 2003 elections in the north and east were postponed, for a third time, until 24 January 2004. In January 2004 elections in the north and east, except for local authorities in Ampara District, were postponed, for a fourth time, until 23 October 2004.

On 27 January 2006 local authority elections were called for the entire country. It was later announced that elections would be held on 30 March 2006 across the entire country. The Election Commissioner subsequently postponed the elections in the north and Batticaloa District until 30 September 2006. On 23 September 2006 elections in the north and Batticaloa District were postponed until 30 June 2007.

VSDC continued to be administered by special commissioners until the 2011 elections.

=== 2011 local government election ===
Results of the local government election held on 23 July 2011:

Alliances and parties	Votes	%	Seats
Tamil National Alliance (EPRLF (S), ITAK, PLOTE, TELO, TULF)	12,895	74.29%	13
United People's Freedom Alliance (EPDP, SLFP et al.)	4,027	23.20%	3
United National Party	435	2.51%	0
Valid Votes	17,357	100.00%	16
Rejected Votes	1,674		
Total Polled	19,031		
Registered Electors	32,857		
Turnout	57.92%		

The following candidates were elected: Thiyakarasa Piragash (TNA), 2,811 preference votes (pv); Rasiah Parameswaralingam (TNA), 2,676 pv; Annathaanam Richard Thavapirakasam (TNA), 2,474 pv; Selvaratnam Uthayakumaaran (TNA), 2,163 pv; Nagendram Luxmikanthan (TNA), 1,852 pv; Ramalingam Rasathurai (TNA), 1,525 pv; Rasa Kumarasamy (TNA), 1,499 pv; Kathiravelu Karunainayagam (TNA), 1,495 pv; Arulappu William Jesuthasan (TNA), 1,479 pv; Vasanthanathan Sivanathan (TNA), 1,406 pv; Muthulingam Navalogarajah (TNA), 1,396 pv; Ratnasingam Arikaran (UPFA), 1,336 pv; Santhirasekaram Santhirakumar (TNA), 1,208 pv; Easwaran Sellathurai (TNA), 1,056 pv; Krushnapillai Rasasegaram (UPFA), 754 pv; and Thambippillai Thevarajan (UPFA), 673 pv.

Thiyakarasa Piragash (TNA) and Rasiah Parameswaralingam (TNA) were appointed chairman and Deputy Chairman respectively.
