= Ramanathan Academy of Fine Arts =

Art school of the University of Jaffna

- இராமநாதன் நுண்கலைத்துறை
- Type: School of Fine Arts
- Parent institution: Faculty of Arts
- Affiliations: University of Jaffna
- Location: Maruthanarmadam, Northern Province, Sri Lanka; 9°43′49.70″N 80°01′35.10″E
- Website: jfn.ac.lk/arts/index.php/rafa

The Ramanathan Academy of Fine Arts is a school of fine art and a division of the University of Jaffna in northern Sri Lanka.

== History ==
The Ramanathan Academy of Fine Arts (RAFA) was founded as a tribute to Sir P. Ramanathan. by his son-in-law, S. Natesan The academy was located at Maruthanarmadam near Chunnakam and its purpose was to promote the education of Tamil classical music and Bharata Natyam.

RAFA was taken over by the University of Sri Lanka in December 1975 and placed under the Jaffna Campus' Faculty of Arts. RAFA was part of the faculty's Department of Fine Arts. The Jaffna Campus was elevated to university status on 1 January 1979 with the creation of the University of Jaffna. In 1992 RAFA was separated from the Department of Fine Arts. RAFA has two departments - Dance and Music - and an Art and Design Unit. Initially functioning as a unit within the Department of Fine Arts, the RAFA eventually evolved and gained status as a distinct department of study within the Faculty of Arts in 1992.
