= Suthumalai =

Suthumalai சுதுமலை සුතුමලෙයි/සුදුකන්ද
- Village
- Location within Sri Lanka
- Coordinates: 9°43′0″N 80°00′0″E
- Country: Sri Lanka
- Province: Northern
- District: Jaffna
- DS Division: Valikamam South‐West

Suthumalai (Tamil: சுதுமலை) is a village located in the northern Jaffna District of Sri Lanka. The village is divided into two Village officer division (Suthumalai North and Suthumalai South), and has a combined population of 3770 according to 2012 census. The village contains many Hindu temples including the famous Suthumalai Amman Temple.

Suthumalai is a historic turning point in Sri Lankan Tamil nationalism, where LTTE leader Velupillai Prabhakaran had his speech on 4 August 1987, addressing over 100,000 people explaining the position of the LTTE.

The village is part of the historic region Valikamam of Jaffna Peninsula with the others being the Vadamarachchi and Thenmarachchi.

== See also ==
- Manipay
- A. W. Mailvaganam
- Uduvil
