= Ramanathan College =

- இராமநாதன் கல்லூரி
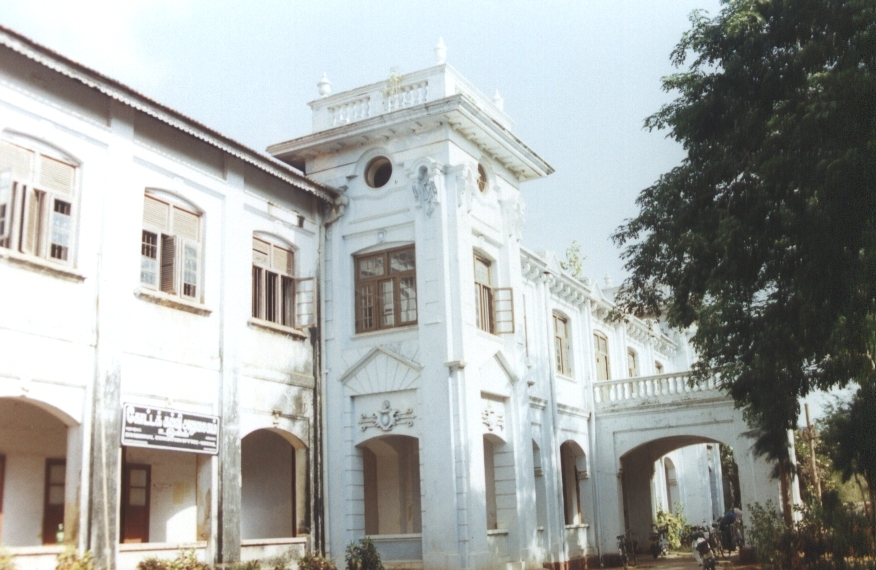

Location
- K.K.S. Road, Maruthanarmadam; Chunnakam, Jaffna District, Northern Province; Sri Lanka; 9°43′51.20″N 80°01′29.50″E

Information
- School type: Public provincial 1AB
- School district: Valikamam Education Zone
- Authority: Northern Provincial Council
- School number: 1010001
- Grades: 1-13
- Gender: Girls with Boys
- Age range: 5-18

Ramanathan College (Tamil: இராமநாதன் கல்லூரி Irāmanātaṉ Kallūri) is a provincial school in Maruthanarmadam near Chunnakam, Sri Lanka.

The singer Maharajapuram Santhanam was once its principal.

== See also ==
- List of schools in Northern Province, Sri Lanka
