= Kondavil =

Kondavil கோண்டாவில் කොන්ඩාවිල්
- Town
- Location within Northern Province Location within Sri Lanka
- Coordinates: 9°42′25″N 80°1′34″E
- Country: Sri Lanka
- Province: Northern
- District: Jaffna
- DS Division: Nallur

Kondavil (Tamil: கோண்டாவில், Sinhala: කොන්ඩාවිල්) is a suburb north of the Sri Lankan city of Jaffna. It is near many temples such as the Uppumada Pillaiyar Temple, Kondavil west Kali kovil,eelaththu Thillaiyampathy sivakami Amman temple part of the Jaffna Peninsula, it was one of the final strongholds of the Tamil Tigers.

== Transport ==
The area is served by the Kondavil railway station.
