= Omanthai =

Omanthai ஓமந்தை ඔමන්ත
- Town
- Location within Northern Province
- Coordinates: 08°52′0″N 80°30′0″E
- Country: Sri Lanka
- Province: Northern
- District: Vavuniya
- DS Division: Vavuniya South (Tamil)

Omanthai is a little town in North Sri Lankan district of Vavuniya. This was where the last Sri Lankan army check point which divided the Government and LTTE controlled areas used to be for many years during the Sri Lankan Civil War.

== Education ==
- Omanthai Central College

== Transport ==
Omanthai railway station is served by the Northern Line of the Sri Lanka Railways. The town is temporarily the terminus of the line, while the track is being rebuilt to Jaffna and Kankesanturai. The railway station was one of the later stations to re-open after being closed during the civil war.

== See also ==
- Thandikulam–Omanthai offensive
- Operation Jayasikurui
- Railway stations in Sri Lanka
- Pandarikulam
