= Mallakam =

Town in northern Sri Lanka

Mallakam மல்லாகம் මල්ලකම්
- Town
- Location in the Northern Province Mallakam (Sri Lanka)
- Coordinates: 9°45′48.40″N 80°01′46.30″E
- Country: Sri Lanka
- Province: Northern
- District: Jaffna
- DS Division: Valikamam North

Government
  - Type: Divisional Council
  - Body: Valikamam North

Population (2012)
  - Total: 6,834
- Time zone: UTC+5:30 (Sri Lanka Standard Time Zone)
- Post Codes: 4112005-4112015
- Telephone Codes: 021
- Vehicle registration: NP

Mallakam (Tamil: மல்லாகம், romanized: Mallākam) (Sinhala: මල්ලකම්) is a town in northern Sri Lanka located approximately 10 kilometres (6 mi) north of the city of Jaffna. The town is divided into three Village Officer Divisions (Mallakam Center, Mallakam North and Mallakam South) whose combined population was 6,834 at the 2012 census.

== Transport ==
- Mallakam railway station
