= Jaffna railway station =

Railway station in Jaffna, Sri Lanka

Jaffna Railway Station யாழ்ப்பாணம் புகையிரத நிலையம் යාපනය දුම්රිය ස්ථානය
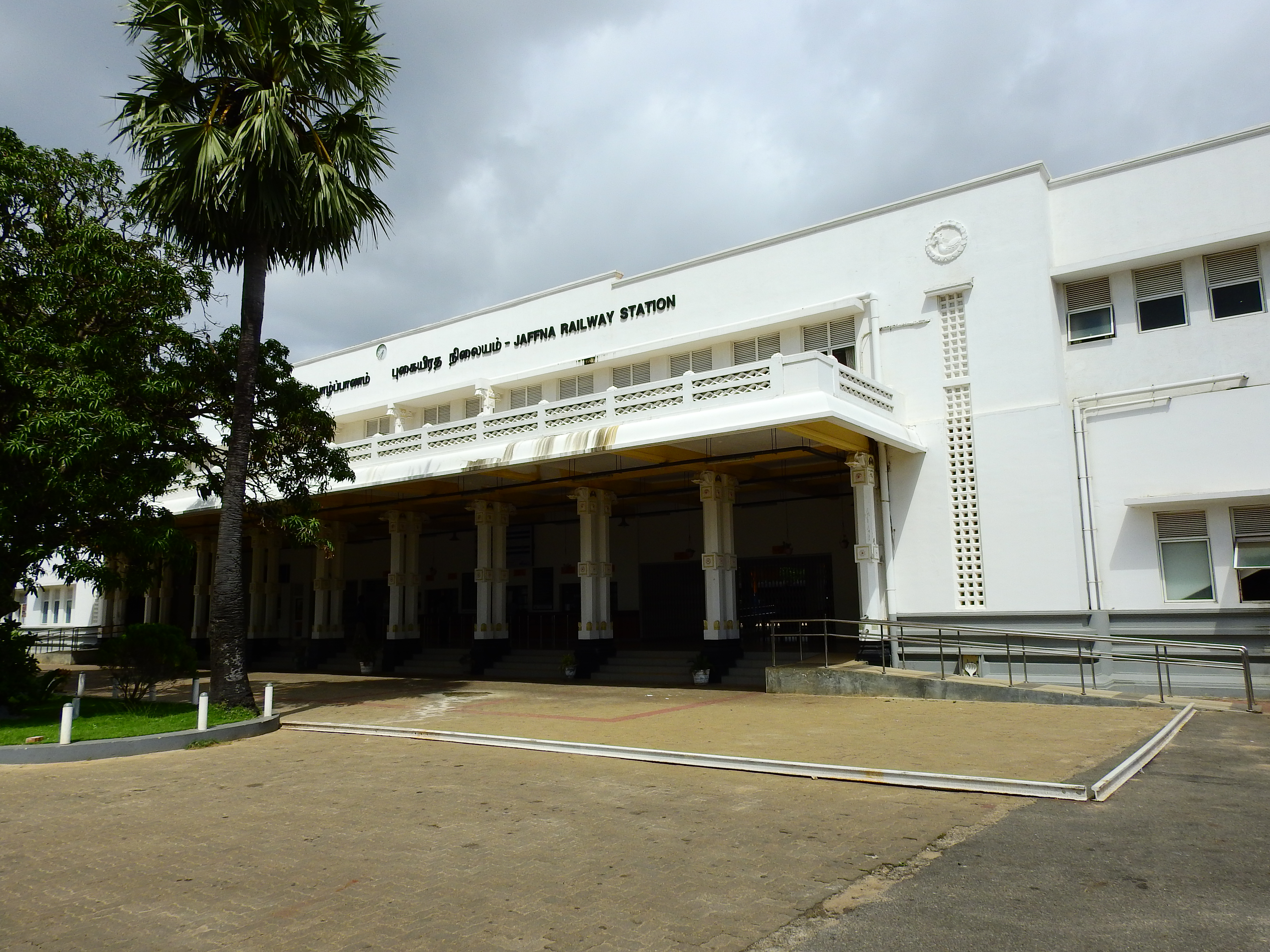
- The station in December 2019

General information
- Location: Jaffna; Sri Lanka
- Coordinates: 9°39′54.60″N 80°01′14.40″E
- System: Sri Lankan Railway Station
- Owner: Sri Lanka Railways
- Line: Northern Line
- Platforms: Three

Construction
- Parking: Yes

Other information
- Status: Functioning

History
- Opened: 1902
- Closed: 1990
- Rebuilt: 13 October 2014

Services
Punkankulam toward Colombo Fort	Yarl Devi; Northern Line	Kokkuvil toward Kankesanthurai
Location
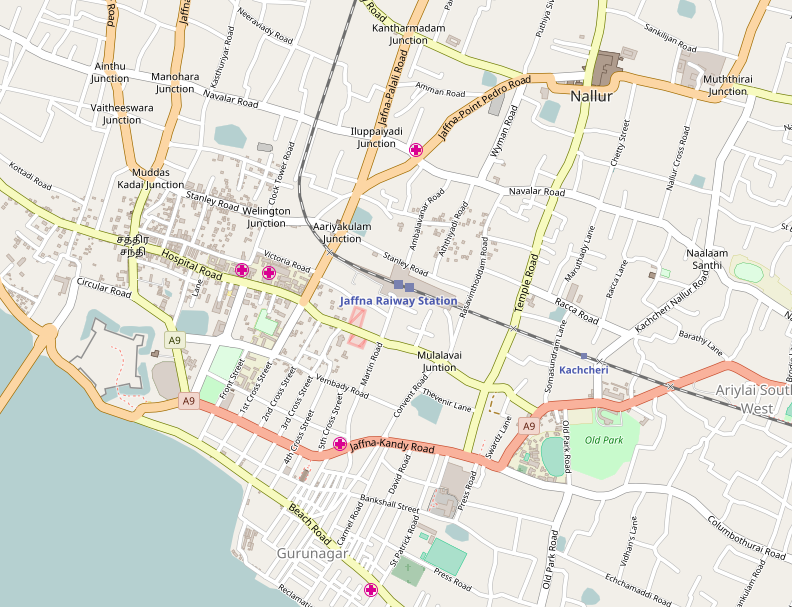
- Location within Central Jaffna

Jaffna railway station (Tamil: யாழ்ப்பாணம் புகையிரத நிலையம், Sinhala: යාපනය දුම්රිය ස්ථානය) is a railway station in the city of Jaffna in northern Sri Lanka. Owned by Sri Lanka Railways, the state-owned railway operator, the station is one of the busiest in the country, linking the north with the capital Colombo.

The popular Yarl Devi service, which operates on the Northern Line, calls at this station. In the late 1980s the station suffered heavy damage due to the civil war. All railway services on the Northern Line north of Vavuniya had stopped by 1990. The station was abandoned, suffering further damage in the following years. The civil war ended in 2009 and the government started various projects to rebuild the line and stations. The Northern Line between Pallai and Jaffna was re-opened on 13 October 2014.

== History ==
=== Origins ===
In the late 19th century residents in northern British Ceylon started campaigning for the construction of a railway line linking the north to the south. The Jaffna Railway Commission report, published in 1891, recommended the construction of a new railway line (now known as the Northern Line) from Polgahawela to Kurunegala and a survey of a line to Jaffna. The line would join the Main Line at Polgahawela Junction, allowing trains to run to the capital Colombo. Approval was given in 1892 and the new line to Kurunegala opened on 14 February 1894. Approval was given in December 1897 for the construction of the Northern Railway and an announcement was made in the Legislative Council in October 1899 that authorisation had been given for the construction of a railway line connecting the north with Colombo. Tenders for the construction of railway line from Kurunegala to Kankesanthurai were called in January 1900 and construction of the new line started at Kurunegala in April 1900. Construction of the 21 miles (34 km) Kankesanthurai-Chavakacheri section, including Jaffna, began in July 1900. This section was officially opened by Governor Sir J. W. Ridgeway on 11 March 1902. The 14 miles (23 km) Chavakacheri-Pallai section was opened on 5 September 1902. The Northern Railway line up to Anuradhapura was opened on 1 November 1904 and the construction of the line up to Medawachchiya was completed on 11 March 1905.

The construction of the line was completed in the next few months and on 1 August 1905 the first train from Colombo arrived at Jaffna Railway Station. The journey took 13 hours and 20 minutes. The single track line between Kankesanthurai and Vavuniya had 16 stations and 12 sub-stations.

=== 20th-century height ===
An express train called Yarl Devi was introduced on the Northern Line on 23 April 1956, cutting the journey time between Jaffna and Colombo to 7 hours. The service flourished and Jaffna became the second largest station in the country. The Yarl Devi service was the largest revenue earner for Sri Lanka Railways. Eight passenger trains and six freight trains operated daily between Jaffna and Colombo. By the early 1980s six thousand people travelled daily on the Northern Line.

=== War and Closure ===
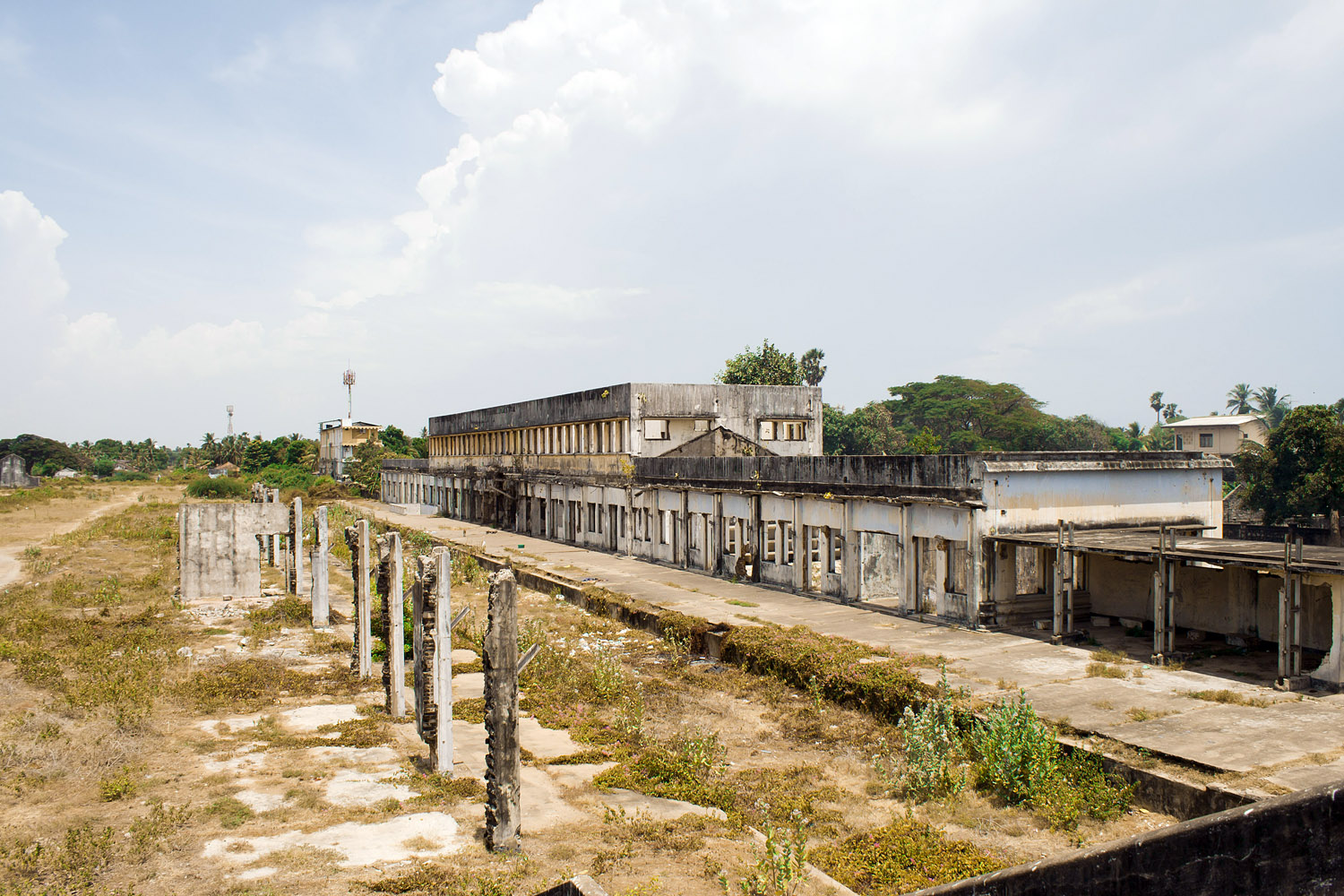
Abandoned station in August 2011

The line's fortunes waned when the civil war started in 1983 - the government increased the number of soldiers stationed in the north, many of whom used the line to return to their homes in the south. Thus the Yarl Devi service became a target for Tamil militants as it passed through areas they controlled. It was blown up by Tamil Eelam Liberation Organization cadres near Murikandy, Mullaitivu District on the night of 19 January 1985, killing 34 people including 22 soldiers and destroying the tracks. The service was attacked again on 25 March 1986 between Puliyankulam and Vavuniya. The railway tracks were relaid by the Indian Peace Keeping Force and in August 1987 the Jaffna-Colombo rail services resumed. However, the deteriorating security meant that only a few people used the service. After the IPKF withdrew from Sri Lanka in 1990 the Liberation Tigers of Tamil Eelam took over most of the territory the IPKF had controlled, including Jaffna. In the middle of 1990 the truce between the LTTE and Sri Lankan government broke down and full-scale war erupted. Intense fighting took place in and around Jaffna as the Sri Lankan military tried to regain control of the area. Hundreds of civilians fleeing the fighting took refuge in Jaffna Railway Station. The station was bombed by the Sri Lanka Air Force (SLAF) on 9 August 1990, damaging 6 train carriages and killing eight people nearby. The station was bombed to a shell by the SLAF. On 13 June 1990 the Yarl Devi service rolled into Jaffna but it could not return to Colombo as the railway track had been destroyed (it would be the last rail service into Jaffna). The station was bombed again on 16 August 1990. In the next few years the entire track between Kankesanthurai and Vavuniya and abandoned railway coaches were removed by the Sri Lankan military and Tamil rebels for use as bunkers.

=== Reconstruction and reopening ===
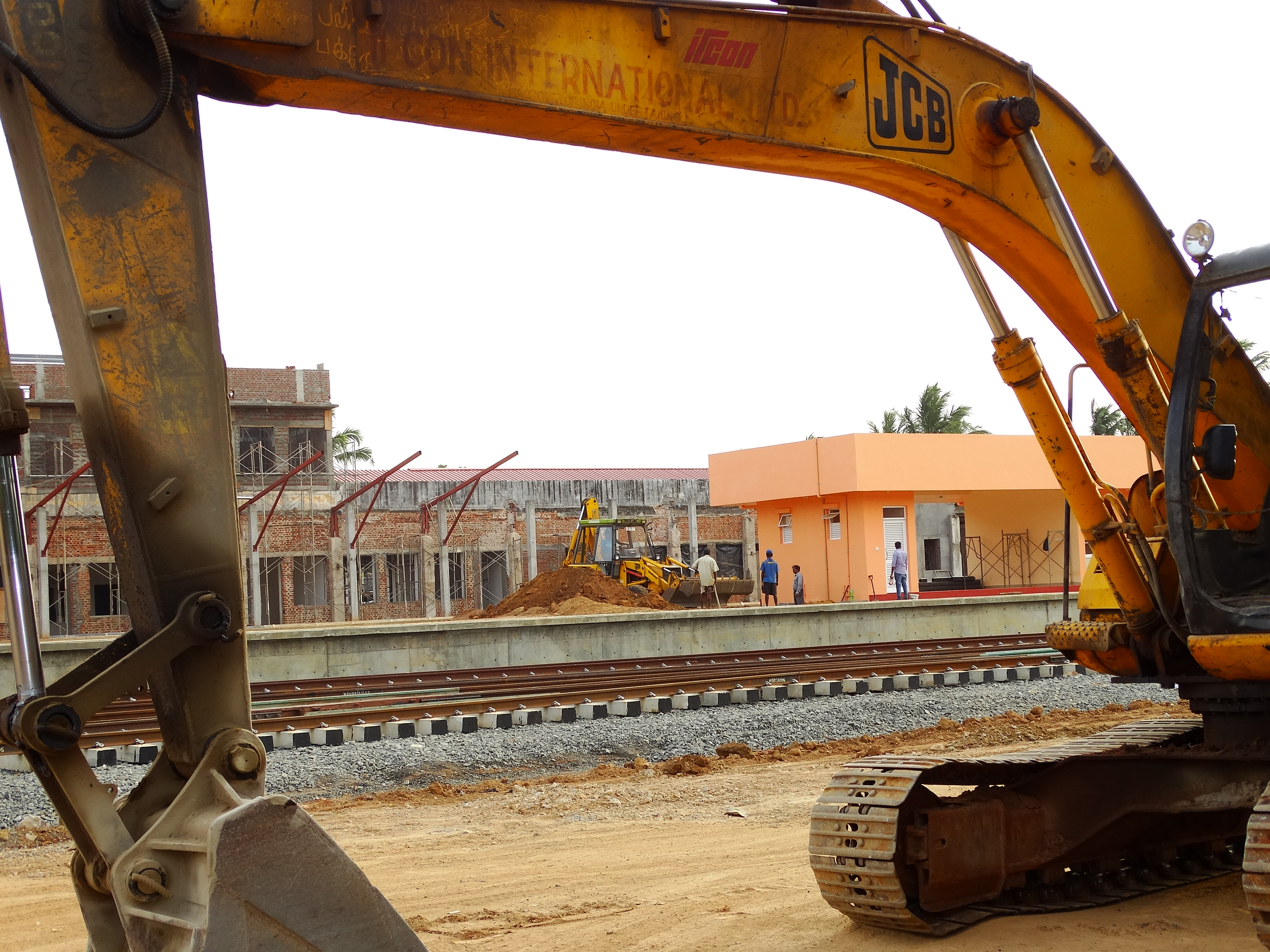
Jaffna Station during reconstruction

The Sri Lankan government regained control of most of the Jaffna Peninsula, including Jaffna, in 1995 but no effort was made to rebuild the Northern Line or the stations along it. Following the end of the civil war in May 2009, the government initiated various projects to rebuild the Northern Line from Vavuniya to Kankesanthurai. The line between Vavuniya and Omanthai was rebuilt by the Sri Lankan military. Thandikulam Railway Station was re-opened on 6 June 2009 and Omanthai Railway Station was re-opened on 27 May 2011.

The contract to reconstruct the 96 kilometres (60 mi) line between Omanthai and Pallai was awarded to Ircon International, the Indian state-owned engineering and construction company. The project was to cost US$ 185 million and would be financed by a soft loan from the Indian government. In June 2011 an agreement was signed between Sri Lanka Railways and the Bank of Ceylon for the reconstruction of Jaffna Railway Station. The project was to cost LKR 89 million. In July 2011 it was announced that Ircon had also been awarded the contract to reconstruct the 56 kilometres (35 mi) line between Pallai and Kankesanthurai. The project was to cost US$ 150 million and would be financed by a loan from the Export-Import Bank of India. The reconstruction of the entire Northern Line had been expected to be completed by the end of 2013.

The line between Omanthai and Kilinochchi was re-opened on 14 September 2013. The line between Kilinochchi and Pallai was re-opened on 4 March 2014. The line between Pallai and Jaffna was re-opened on 13 October 2014.

== Services ==
This station is served by six Northern-Line trains, including the Yal Devi, Uttara Devi Intercity, AC Intercity, Night Mail and two unnamed services.
