= Yal Devi =

Passenger train

Yal Devi யாழ் தேவி යාල් දේවී
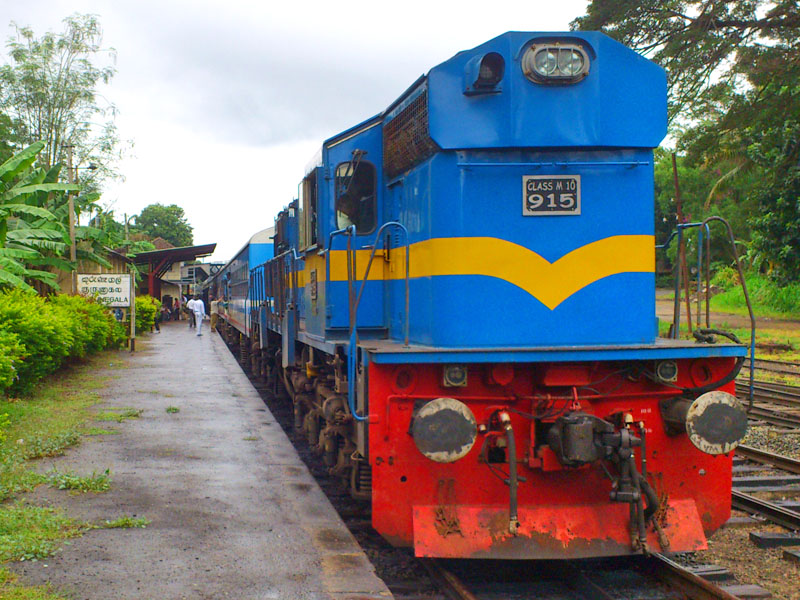
- Yal Devi Train At Kurunegala railway station

Overview
- Service type: Express Train
- Status: In service
- Locale: Sri Lanka
- First service: Approx 1956
- Last service: present
- Current operator: Sri Lanka Railways
- Former operator: Ceylon Government Railway

Route
- Termini: Mount Lavinia; Kankesanturai
- Service frequency: Daily
- Train numbers: 4077 (Colombo Fort-Kankasanthurai); 4078 (Kankesanturai-Colombo Fort)

On-board services
- Classes: 1st, 2nd, 3rd Classes
- Seating arrangements: Available
- Sleeping arrangements: Not Available
- Observation facilities: Not Available

Technical
- Track gauge: 5 ft 6 in (1,676 mm)
- Operating speed: 120km/h

Yal Devi (Tamil: யாழ் தேவி; Sinhala: යාල් දේවී) is a major express train in Sri Lanka. Operated by Sri Lanka Railways, the Yal Devi connects Colombo, the nation's commercial hub, with the northern city of Jaffna and its port at Kankesanturai, where the service terminates. From 1990 up to 2015, the service had to terminate at intermediate stations, due to the Sri Lankan civil war. The Northern Line was rebuilt and returned to Jaffna Railway Station by October 2014 and Kankesanturai by January 2015.

== Services ==
The Yal Devi offers three classes of travel. First class second class, and third class.

== History ==
Though trains had been operating on the Northern Line since the beginning of the twentieth century, the services were not named. In the 1950s named trains were established on the major lines. The Yal Devi, as a named-express train, was established to connect Colombo, Jaffna, and Kankesanturai, as commissioned by B. D. Rampala, the railways' then-general manager.

In 1990, the Yal Devi stopped operating past Vavuniya because of the declining security condition.

After the war ended in 2009, work started to rebuild the track and restore the Yal Devi service to Kankesanturai, under the Uthuru Mithuru Project. Initially, the service was extended to Thandikulam, With effect from 13 October 2014 it has been begun services up to newly rebuilt Jaffna railway station after twenty four years. The restoration of northern railway tracks project has been funded by a line of credit provided by the Government of India.

The Yal Devi service was ceremoniously declared open by President Mahinda Rajapaksa 13 October 2014.

== Route ==
The Yal Devi follows Sri Lanka Railways' Northern Line. The train begins its northbound journey at Colombo Fort. At Polgahawela, the train branches off the Main Line, moving towards Kankesanturai. It passes Kurunegala, the capital of North Western Province, before continuing to the historic cultural and religious center of Anuradhapura, the island's ancient capital from the 4th century BCE and home to many sites of religious and archaeological interest. After passing Vavuniya it reaches Omanthai. The train passes through Kilinochchi and continues to Jaffna. The Northern Line has been extended to Kankesanturai, its terminus and the northernmost railway station in Sri Lanka. The entire re-construction of the Northern Line (from Omanthai to Kankesanthurai – 146 km) was completed during the latter half of 2014, and it was opened to public on 3 January 2015.

== See also ==
- Sri Lanka Railways
- List of named passenger trains of Sri Lanka
