= Northern line (Sri Lanka) =

Railway line in Sri Lanka

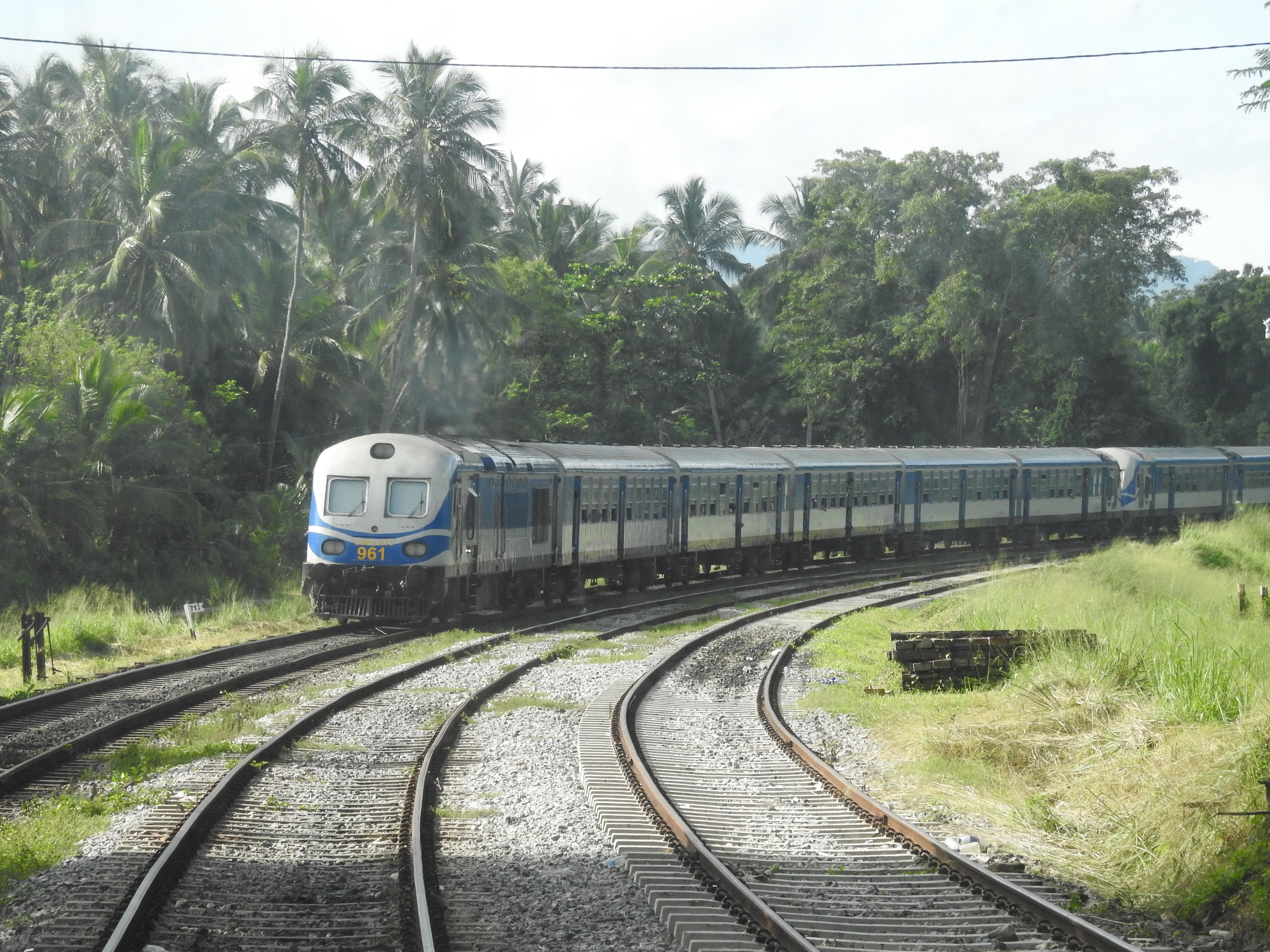
- A long-distance train on the Northern Line, Northern Province, Sri Lanka.

Overview
- Status: Operational
- Owner: Sri Lanka Railways
- Line number: 4
- Locale: Sri Lanka
- Termini: Polgahawela Junction; Kankesanthurai
- Stations: 55

Service
- System: Sri Lanka Railways
- Services: Yal Devi Express Train; Uttara Devi Intercity Express Train; Rajarata Rejini Express Train; Sri Devi Intercity Express Train; Yal Nila Odyssey
- Operator: Sri Lanka Railways

History
- Opened: 14 February 1894

Technical
- Line length: 339 km (211 mi)
- Track gauge: 5 ft 6 in (1,676 mm)
- Loading gauge: 1676
- Electrification: No

The northern line is a railway line in Sri Lanka. Branching off the Main Line at Polgahawela Junction the line heads north through North Western, North Central and Northern provinces before terminating at the northern port of Kankesanthurai. The line is 339 kilometres (211 mi) long and has 55 stations between Polgahawela Junction and Vavuniya. It is the longest railway line in Sri Lanka. The line opened in 1894. Major cities served by the line include Kurunegala, Anuradhapura, Vavuniya,Kilinochchi and Jaffna. The popular Yal Devi service operates on the line. The line was severely affected by the civil war and no services operated north of Vavuniya after 1990. Reconstruction of this section of the line commenced following the end of the civil war in 2009 and was fully completed in early 2015.

== History ==
=== Construction ===
The Jaffna Railway Commission report published in 1891 recommended the construction of a new railway line (now known as the northern line) from Polgahawela to Kurunegala and a survey of a line to Jaffna. The line would join the Main Line at Polgahawela Junction, allowing trains to run to the capital Colombo. Approval was given in 1892 and the new line to Kurunegala opened on 14 February 1894. Approval was given in December 1897 for the construction of the Northern Railway and an announcement was made in the Legislative Council in October 1899 that authorisation had been given for the construction of a railway line connecting the north with Colombo.

Tenders for the construction of railway line from Kurunegala to Kankesanthurai were called in January 1900 and construction of the new line started at Kurunegala in April 1900. Construction of the 21 miles (34 km) Kankesanthurai-Chavakacheri section, including Jaffna, began in July 1900. This section was officially opened by Governor Sir J. W. Ridgeway on 11 March 1902. The 14 miles (23 km) Chavakacheri-Pallai section was opened on 5 September 1902. The northern railway line up to Anuradhapura was opened on 1 November 1904 and the construction of the line up to Medawachchiya was completed on 11 March 1905. The construction of the line was completed in the next few months and on 1 August 1905, the first train from Colombo arrived at Jaffna Railway Station. The journey took 13 hours and 20 minutes. The single track line between Kankesanthurai and Vavuniya had 16 stations and 12 sub-stations.

=== Operational height ===
An express train called Yarl Devi was introduced on the northern line on 23 April 1956, cutting the journey time between Jaffna and Colombo to 7 hours. The service flourished and Jaffna became the second largest station in the country. The Yarl Devi service was the largest revenue earner for Sri Lanka Railways. Eight passenger trains and six freight trains operated daily between Jaffna and Colombo. By the early 1980s six thousand people travelled daily on the northern line.

=== War and partial closure ===
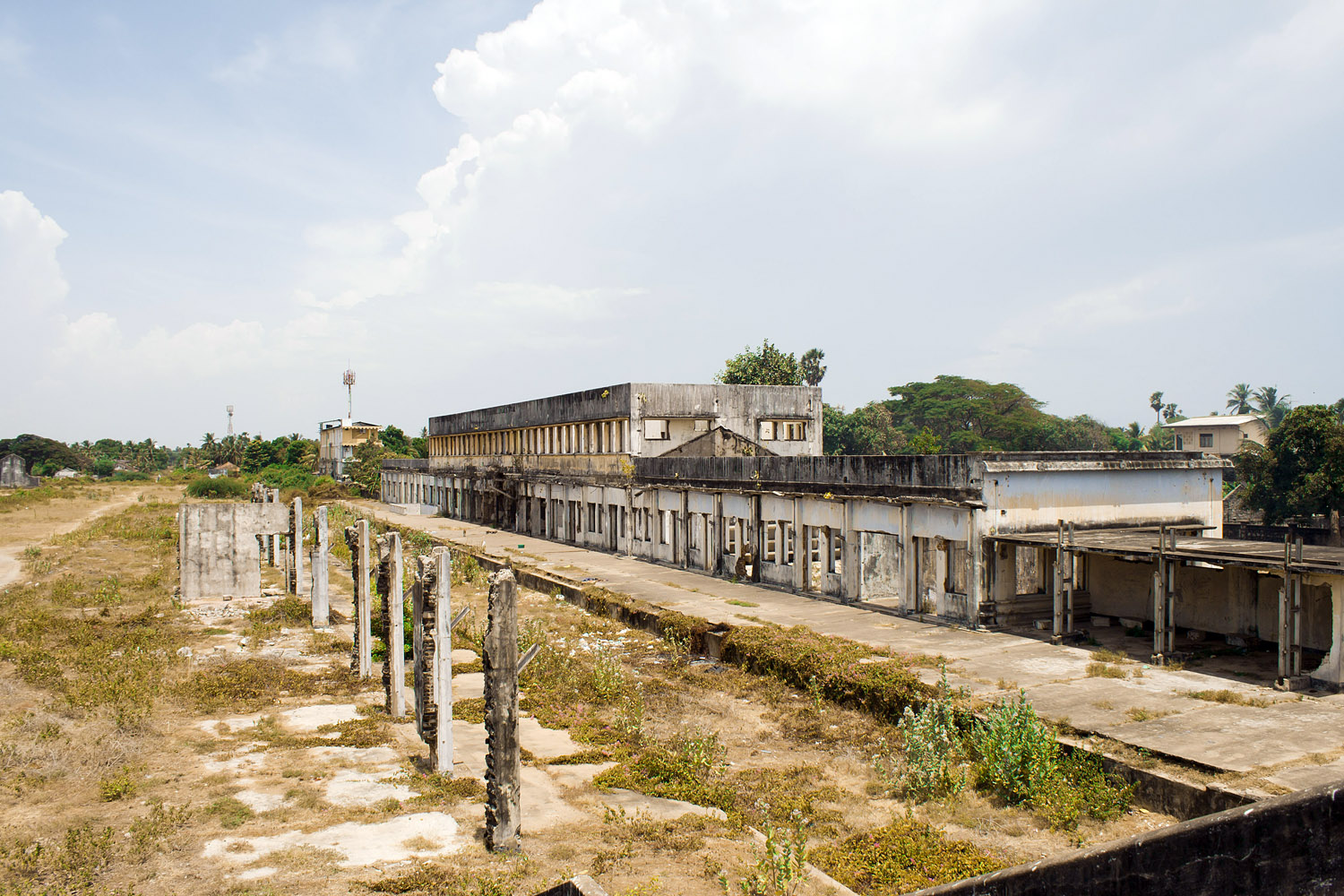
The remains of Jaffna station after the war

The line's fortunes waned when the civil war started in 1983 - the government increased the number of soldiers stationed in the north, many of whom used the line to return to their homes in the south. Thus the Yarl Devi service became a target for Tamil militants as it passed through areas they controlled. It was blown up by Tamil Eelam Liberation Organization cadres near Murikandy, Mullaitivu District on the night of 19 January 1985, killing 34 people including 22 soldiers and destroying the tracks. The service was attacked again on 25 March 1986 between Puliyankulam and Vavuniya. The railway tracks were relaid by the Indian Peace Keeping Force and in August 1987 the Jaffna-Colombo rail services resumed. However, the deteriorating security meant that only a few people used the service. After the IPKF withdrew from Sri Lanka in 1990 the Liberation Tigers of Tamil Eelam took over most of the territory the IPKF had controlled, including Jaffna. In the middle of 1990 the truce between the LTTE and Sri Lankan government broke down and full-scale war erupted. Intense fighting took place in and around Jaffna as the Sri Lankan military tried to regain control of the area. Hundreds of civilians fleeing the fighting took refuge in Jaffna Railway Station. The station was bombed by the Sri Lanka Air Force (SLAF) on 9 August 1990, damaging 6 train carriages and killing eight people nearby. The station was bombed to a shell by the SLAF. On 13 June 1990 the Yarl Devi service rolled into Jaffna but it could not return to Colombo as the railway track had been destroyed (it would be the last rail service into Jaffna). The station was bombed again on 16 August 1990. In the next few years the entire track between Kankesanthurai and Vavuniya and abandoned railway coaches were removed by the Sri Lankan military and Tamil rebels for use as bunkers.

=== Reconstruction ===
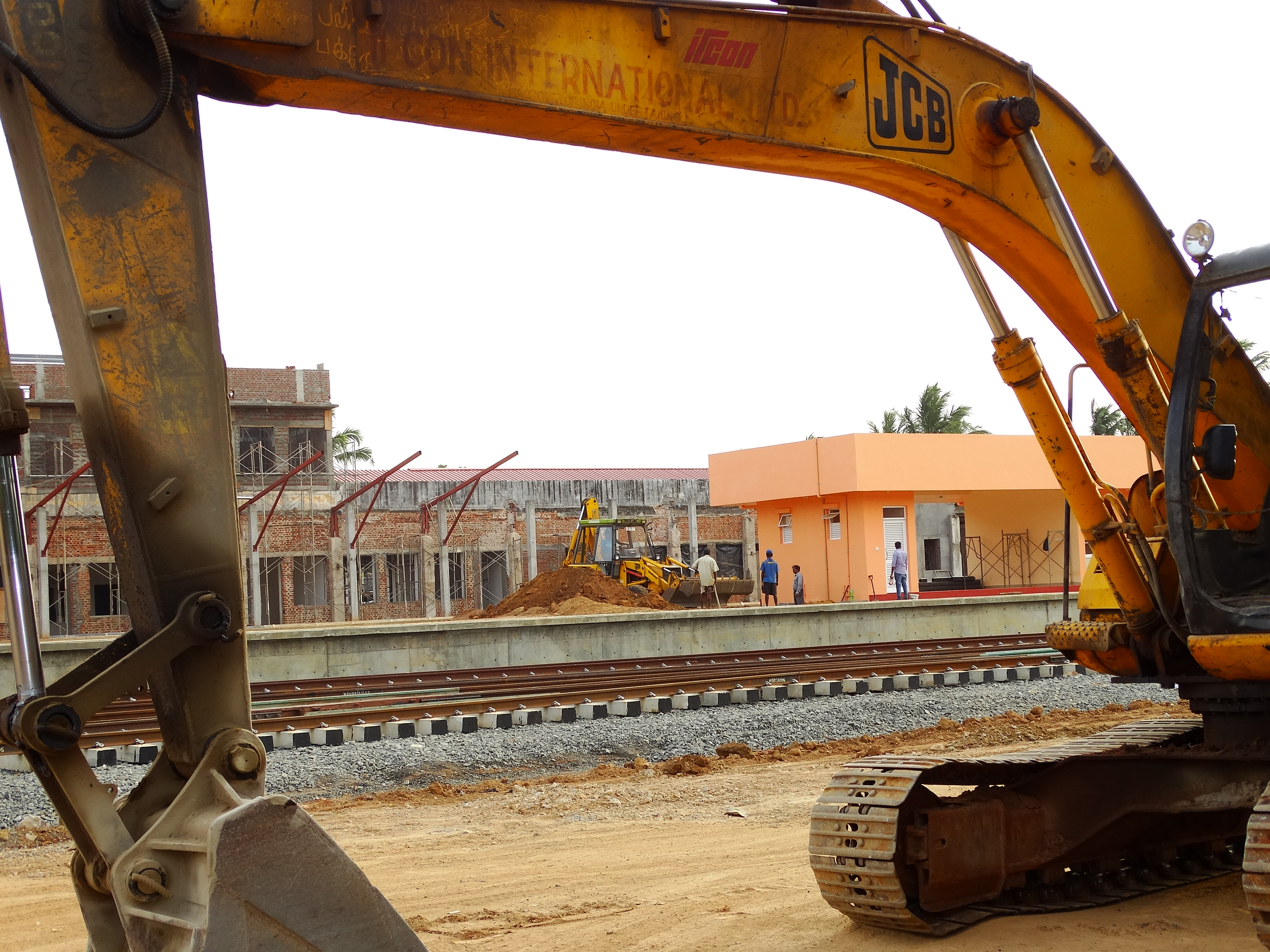
Jaffna station during reconstruction

The Sri Lankan government regained control of most of the Jaffna Peninsula, including Jaffna, in 1995 but no effort was made to rebuild the northern line or the stations along it. Following the end of the civil war in May 2009 the government initiated various projects to rebuild the northern line from Vavuniya to Kankesanthurai. The line between Vavuniya and Omanthai was rebuilt by the Sri Lankan military. Thandikulam railway station was re-opened on 6 June 2009 and Omanthai railway station was re-opened on 27 May 2011.

The contract to reconstruct the 96 kilometres (60 mi) line between Omanthai and Pallai was awarded to Ircon International, the Indian state-owned engineering and construction company. The project was to cost US$ 185 million and would be financed by a soft loan from the Indian government. In June 2011 an agreement was signed between Sri Lanka Railways and the Bank of Ceylon for the reconstruction of Jaffna Railway Station. The project was to cost LKR 89 million. In July 2011 it was announced that Ircon International had also been awarded the contract to reconstruct the 56 kilometres (35 mi) line between Pallai and Kankesanthurai. The project was to cost US$ 150 million and would be financed by a loan from the Export-Import Bank of India. The reconstruction of the entire northern line had been expected to be completed by the end of 2013.

The line between Omanthai and Kilinochchi was re-opened on 14 September 2013. The line between Kilinochchi and Pallai was re-opened on 4 March 2014. The line between Pallai and Jaffna was re-opened on 13 October 2014. The final stretch of the line, between Jaffna and Kankesanthurai, was re-opened on 2 January 2015.

== Route description ==
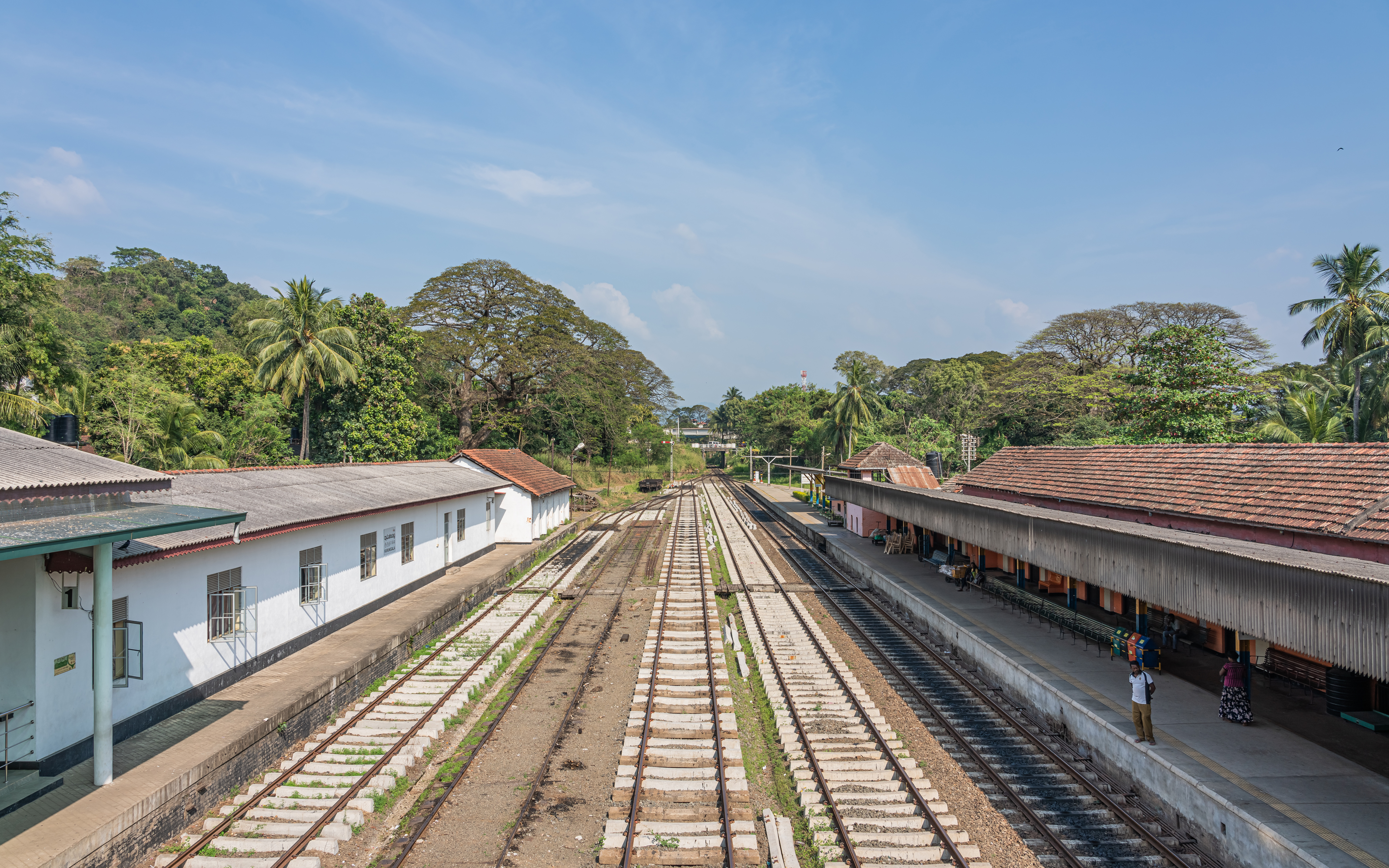
Kurunegala is a major station on the line

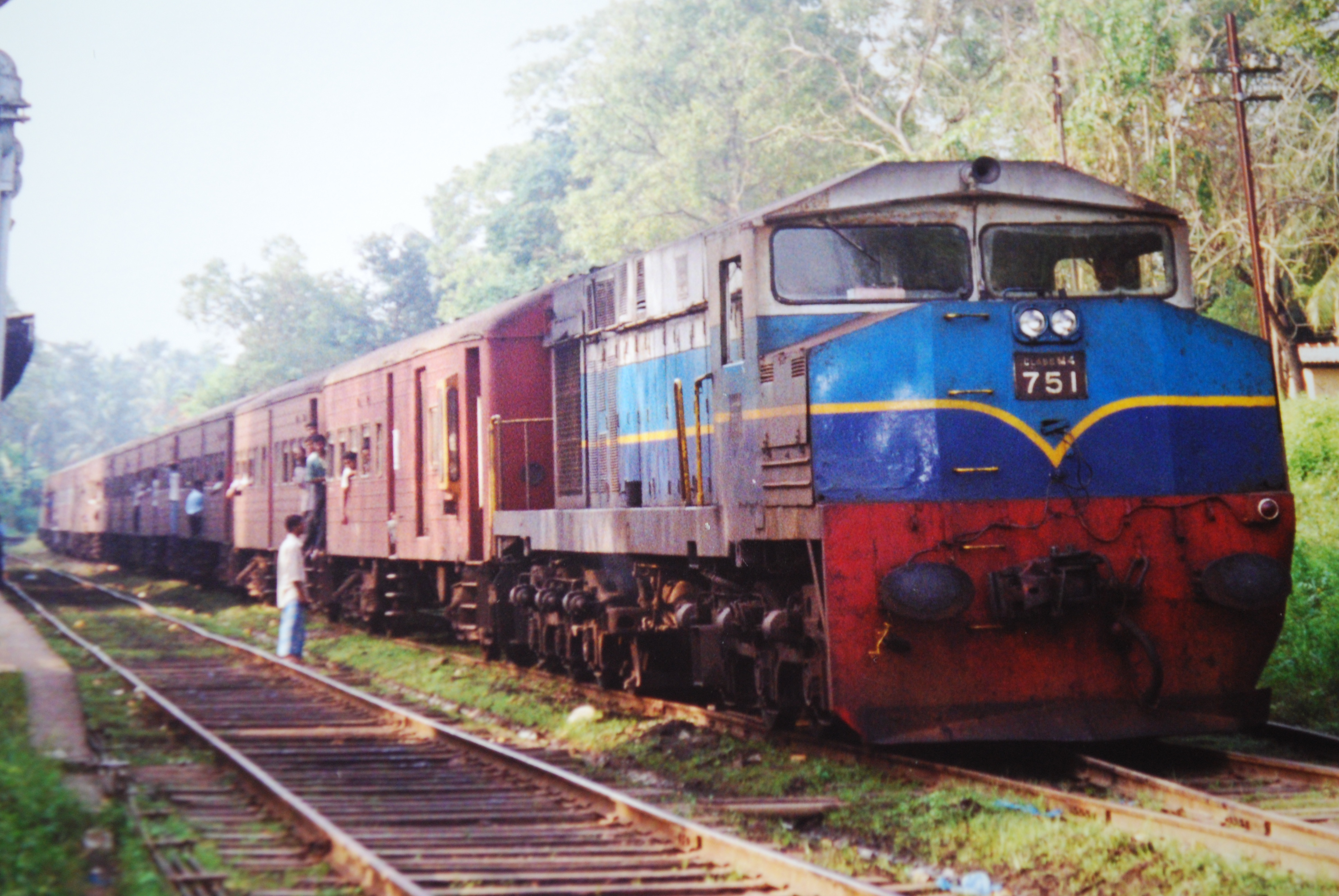
A train waiting at a station on the northern line

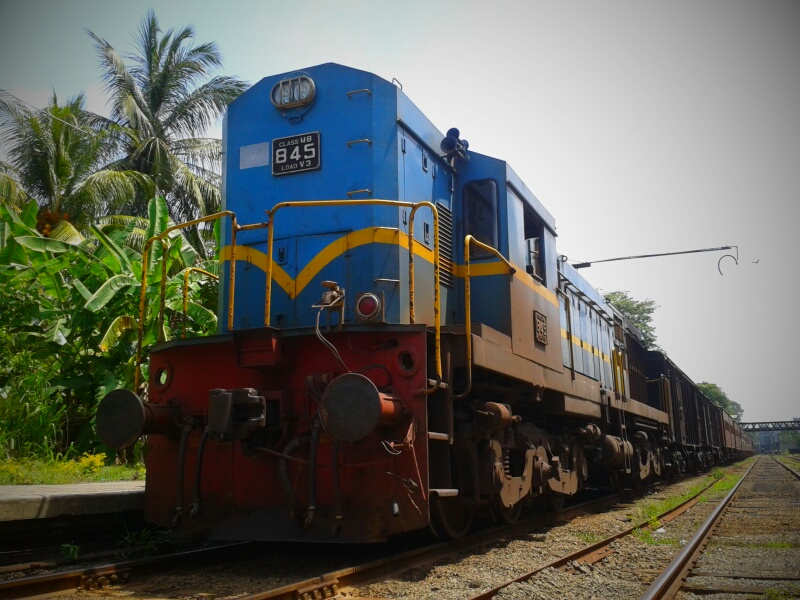
Semaphore signals at Maho junction

The northern line consists of a main line running from Polgahawela to Kankesanturai and a short branch line to Mihintale. The route serves as a backbone for the country's rail services with other lines branching out from it. The Batticaloa line and the Mannar Line branch off from the northern line at Mahawa (Maho) and Medawachchiya, respectively, to serve Polonnaruwa, Trincomalee, Batticaloa, Mannar, and Talaimannar. The route mainly runs through open country, across the North Central plains. At Elephant Pass, it crosses the lagoon to enter the Jaffna Peninsula.

== Services ==
The northern line is mainly served by intercity trains connecting major cities. More than a dozen trains run on the line in each direction each day. Major named services that use the line include Yal Devi and Uttara Devi.

=== Operators and service providers ===
Sri Lanka Railways operates passenger services on the northern line, the most notable service on the line being the Yal Devi. ExpoRail operates a premium service on certain Sri Lanka Railways trains on the northern line, in partnership with Sri Lanka Railways.

== Infrastructure ==
The northern line is entirely single track, except at stations. Track gauge is 5 ft 6 in (1,676 mm) broad gauge. As train frequency increases, it is becoming increasingly challenging to operate trains running both direction on the single-line track. The stretch between Polgahawela and Maho is 70 km long, but only has five stations with the facility to let trains pass each other. To relieve this, SLR is planning to add a second line to dual track this portion of the line. As of June 2012, the feasibility study on this project had yet to begin.

The northern line is not electrified, regular services run on diesel power. Current operating speed between Polgahawela and Omanthai is 80 km/h. The section from Omanthai to Kankesanturai is being rebuilt with a design speed of 120 km/h, significantly increasing operating speeds.

=== Signalling ===
South of Anuradhapura, the line currently operates on a lock-and-block signaling system. In 2011, the railways began a project to add electronic signalling to the rail lines in the north. The northern line between Anuradhapura and Kankesanturai was given electronic signalling with centralized traffic control, interlocking colour light system with electrically operated points, and track detection system. Level crossings would also be connected to the signalling system, thus ensuring safety at crossings.
