= Kankesanthurai railway station =

Railway station in Kankesanthurai, Sri Lanka

Kankesanthurai காங்கேசன்துறை කන්කසන්තුරේ

General information
- Location: Kankesanthurai; Sri Lanka
- Coordinates: 9°48′52.10″N 80°02′54.10″E
- System: Sri Lankan Railway Station
- Owner: Sri Lanka Railways
- Line: Northern Line
- Platforms: 2
- Tracks: 2

Other information
- Status: Functioning

History
- Rebuilt: 2 January 2015

Services
Yal Devi ,...
Route map
Location

Kankesanthurai railway station (Tamil: காங்கேசன்துறை தொடருந்து நிலையம் Kāṅkēcaṉtuṟai toṭaruntu nilaiyam) is a railway station in the town of Kankesanthurai in northern Sri Lanka. Owned by Sri Lanka Railways, the state-owned railway operator, the station is part of the Northern Line which links the north with the capital Colombo. The station was not functioning between 1990 and 2015 due to the civil war. The Northern Line between Jaffna and Kankesanthurai was re-opened on 2 January 2015.

== Services ==
The following train services are available from/to the station:

←	Service	→
Maviddapuram from Colombo Fort	4017; Intercity	Terminus
Terminus	4018; Intercity	Maviddapuram toward Colombo Fort
Chunnakam from Mount Lavinia via Colombo Fort	4021; Intercity (AC)	Terminus
Terminus	4022; Intercity (AC)	Chunnakam toward Mount Lavinia via Colombo Fort
Maviddapuram from Jaffna	4442; Local	Terminus
Terminus	4882; Local	Maviddapuram toward Jaffna
