= List of railway stations in Sri Lanka by line =

== Ordered by railway track ==
=== Main Line ===
The line from Colombo Fort to Badulla

railway station	Code	District	Elevation m	Distance between Colombo Fort Km
Colombo Fort	FOT	Colombo	4.87	0
Maradana	MDA	Colombo	5.46	2.08
Dematagoda	DAG	Colombo	3.05	4.54
Kelaniya	KLA	Gampaha	3.96	7.72
Wanawasala	WSL	Gampaha	3.25	9.42
Hunupitiya	HUN	Gampaha	3.04	10.84
Ederamulla	EDM	Gampaha	3.18	12.58
Horape	HRP	Gampaha	3.52	14.98
Ragama Junction	RGM	Gampaha	3.65	16.42
Walpola	WPA	Gampaha	4.25	19
Batuwaththa	BTU	Gampaha	4.3	20.08
Bulugahagoda	BGU	Gampaha	8.05	21.64
Ganemulla	GAN	Gampaha	9.45	23.44
Yagoda	YGD	Gampaha	9.99	25.28
Gampaha	GPH	Gampaha	10.97	28.4
Daraluwa	DRL	Gampaha	11.05	30.8
Bemmulla	BEM	Gampaha	12.25	32.78
Magalegoda	MGG	Gampaha	14.75	35.03
Heendeniya Pattiyagoda	HDP	Gampaha	14.89	36.5
Veyangoda	VGD	Gampaha	18.59	38.3
Wadurawa	WRW	Gampaha	19.31	40.14
Keenawala	KEN	Gampaha	20.75	42.36
Pallewela	PLL	Gampaha	27.42	44.7
Ganegoda	GND	Gampaha	27.43	46.98
Wijaya Rajadahana	WRD	Gampaha	30.83	49.32
Meerigama	MIG	Gampaha	50	51.04
Wilwatta	WWT	Gampaha	53.69	52.86
Botale	BTL	Gampaha	51.37	54.9
Ambepussa	APS	Gampaha	55.48	56.98
Yaththalgoda	YTG	Kurunegala	56.37	60.58
Bujjomuwa	BJM	Kurunegala	56.98	62.66
Alawwa	ALW	Kurunegala	57.92	66.48
Walakumbura	WKA	Kurunegala	56.52	70.52
Polgahawela Junction	PLG	Kurunegala	74.39	73.92
Panaliya	PNL	Kurunegala	74.11	77.5
Tismalpola	TSM	Kegalle	76.71	79.74
Korossa	KSA	Kegalle		80.5
Yatagama	YTM	Kegalle	77.06	82.02
Rambukkana	RBK	Kegalle	88.42	85.14
Kadigamuwa	KMA	Kegalle	194.81	90.14
Yatiweldeniya		Kegalle		
Gangoda	GDA	Kegalle	165.21	94.42
Ihala Kotte	IKT	Kegalle	210.57	96.74
Bambaragala		Kegalle		97.7
Makehelwala		Kegalle		
Balana	BNA	Kandy	428.35	101.66
Weralugolla		Kandy		102.8
Kadugannawa	KGW	Kandy	515.24	106.1
Kotabogolla		Kandy		107.9
Urapola		Kandy		108.9
Pilimatalawa	PLT	Kandy	500.93	109.94
Barammane		Kandy		111.8
Kiribathkumbura		Kandy		113
Peradeniya Junction	PDA	Kandy	473.47	115.34
Koshinna	KHA	Kandy		116.34
Gelioya	GEY	Kandy	499.39	119.92
Polgahaanga		Kandy		121.4
Weligalla		Kandy		122.4
Botalapitiya		Kandy		
Gangathilaka		Kandy		124.8
Kahatapitiya		Kandy		125.8
Gampola	GPL	Kandy	479.26	127.38
Wallahagoda		Kandy		129.4
Tembiligala	TBL	Kandy	521.39	131.3
Warakapitiya		Kandy		132
Ulapane	ULP	Kandy	562.8	134.68
Pallegama		Kandy		137.4
Warakawa		Kandy		139.4
Nawalapitiya	NWP	Kandy	583.23	141.64
Selam	SLM	Kandy		143.4
Hieghtenford	HYF	Kandy		145.6
Inguruoya	INO	Kandy	663.41	147.4
Penrose		Kandy		150.3
Galboda	GBD	Kandy	786.89	153.12
Dekinda		Kandy		155.2
Wewelthalawa	WWL	Nuwara Eliya		159.1
Watawala	WLA	Nuwara Eliya	993.59	162.52
Ihala Watawala	IWL	Nuwara Eliya	1005.31	164.4
Rozella	RZL	Nuwara Eliya	1140.35	167.98
Hatton	HTN	Nuwara Eliya	1262.5	175.98
Galkandawatta		Nuwara Eliya		
Kotagala	KGA	Nuwara Eliya	1239.32	180.1
St. Clair	SCR	Nuwara Eliya		185.6
Thalawakelle	TKL	Nuwara Eliya	1199.69	187.44
Watagoda	WTG	Nuwara Eliya	1341.46	194.2
Great Western	GWN	Nuwara Eliya	1455.48	199.3
Radella	RDL	Nuwara Eliya	1575.31	203.16
Nanu Oya	NOA	Nuwara Eliya	1613.1	206.9
Perakumpura	PKP	Nuwara Eliya	1729.81	211
Ambewela	ABL	Nuwara Eliya	1827.77	222.96
Pattipola	PPL	Badulla	1897.56	226.78
Ohiya	OHA	Badulla	1791.77	231.4
Idalgashinna	IGH	Badulla	1665.85	240.28
Glenanore		Badulla		245.4
Haputale	HPT	Badulla	1479.57	247.66
Diyatalawa	DLA	Badulla	1331.4	252.68
Bandarawela	BDA	Badulla	1225.5	258.72
Kinigama	KNM	Badulla	1190.55	261
Heeloya	HLO	Badulla	1118.9	264.84
Kitalella	KEL	Badulla	1091.43	269.83
Ella	ELL	Badulla	1041.46	271.03
Demodara	DDR	Badulla	912.5	278.14
Uduwara	UDW	Badulla	876.95	282.98
Hali-Ela	HEA	Badulla	732.71	285.92
Badulla	BAD	Badulla	652.43	291.6

=== Matale Line ===
The line from Peradeniya Junction to Matale

railway station	Code	District	Elevation m	Distance between Colombo Fort Km
Peradeniya Junction	PDA	Kandy	473.47	115.34
Sarasavi Uyana	SUA	Kandy	479.26	117
Rajawatte railway halt		Kandy		
Randles Hill railway halt		Kandy		
Suduhumpola		Kandy		
Kandy	KDT	Kandy	488.41	119.5
Asgirya		Kandy		120.66
Mahiyawa	MYA	Kandy	526.21	121.16
Katugastota Road		Kandy		121.74
Mavilmada		Kandy		123.52
Katugastota	KTG	Kandy	467.68	125.02
Pallethalawinna		Kandy	465.58	126.38
Udathalawinna	UDL	Kandy		127.52
Meegammana		Kandy		129.47
Yatirawana		Kandy		130.88
Wattegama	WGA	Kandy	493.9	131.6
Yatawara		Kandy		133.91
Pathanpaha	PTP	Matale		136.08
Marukona		Matale		139.36
Udaththawala		Matale		
Ukuwela	UKL	Matale	393.9	141.6
Tawalankoya	TWY	Matale		142.94
Elwala		Matale		144.06
Kohobiliwala		Matale		145.22
Matale	MTL	Matale	351.21	147.14

=== Puttalam Line ===
The line from Ragama Junction to Noor Nagar

railway station	Code	District	Elevation m	Distance between Colombo Fort Km
Ragama Junction	RGM	Gampaha	3.65	16.42
Peralanda	PRL	Gampaha		17
Kandana	KAN	Gampaha	5.79	17.42
Kapuwatta	KAW	Gampaha		19.44
Ja-Ela	JLA	Gampaha	5.18	21.04
Thudella	TUD	Gampaha		22.8
Kudahakkapola	KUD	Gampaha		23.92
Alawathupitiya	AWP	Gampaha		25.38
Seeduwa	SED	Gampaha	4.87	26.92
Liyanagemulla	LGM	Gampaha		29.02
Inventment Promotion Zone	IPZ	Gampaha		30.4
Colombo Airport Katunayake	CAK	Gampaha		31.80
Katunayaka	KTK	Gampaha	5.79	32.3
Kurana	KUR	Gampaha		34.14
Negombo	NGB	Gampaha	2.18	37.64
Kattuwa	KAT	Gampaha		40.94
Kochchikade	KCH	Gampaha	8.84	43.84
Waikkala	WKL	Puttalam		45.42
Bolawatta	BLT	Puttalam	7.62	47.64
Boralessa	BSA	Puttalam		50.14
Lunuwila	LWL	Puttalam	7.01	53.08
Thummodara	TDR	Puttalam		58
Nattandiya	NAT	Puttalam	5.18	60.08
Walahapitiya	WHP	Puttalam		63.92
Kudawewa	KWW	Puttalam	8.84	66.46
Nelumpokuna	NPK	Puttalam		67.21
Madampe	MDP	Puttalam	6.09	70.64
Kakkapalliya	KYA	Puttalam		75.04
Sawarana	SWR	Puttalam		78.24
Chilaw	CHL	Puttalam		81.04
Manuwangama	MNG	Puttalam		86.4
Bangadeniya	BGY	Puttalam		89.6
Arachchikattuwa	AKT	Puttalam		92.8
Anawilundawa		Puttalam		
Battuluoya	BOA	Puttalam	4.57	99.2
Pulichchikulam	PCK	Puttalam		103.7
Mundel	MNL	Puttalam	4.57	108.24
Mangala Eliya	MGE	Puttalam		115.14
Madurankuli	MKI	Puttalam	2.74	120
Erukkalampiddy		Puttalam		
Palavi	PVI	Puttalam	3.04	128.62
Thillayadi		Puttalam		
Puttalam	PTM	Puttalam	2.74	133.24
Noor Nagar	NOR	Puttalam		

=== Kelani Valley Line ===
The line from Maradana to Avissawella

railway station	Code	District	Elevation m	Distance between Colombo Fort Km
Maradana	MDA	Colombo	5.46	2.08
Baseline Road	BSL	Colombo	5.18	2.82
Cotta Road	CRD	Colombo	5.65	3.46
Narahenpita	NHP	Colombo	3.65	5.04
Kirulapone	KPE	Colombo		7.26
Nugegoda	NUG	Colombo	3.96	9.04
Pengiriwatte		Colombo		
Udahamulla	UHM	Colombo		11.46
Nawinna	NWN	Colombo	10.67	13.14
Maharagama	MAG	Colombo		14.36
Pannipitiya	PAN	Colombo	21.65	16.98
Kottawa	KOT	Colombo		19.29
Malapalle	MPL	Colombo		20.46
Makumbura		Colombo		
Homagama Hospital		Colombo		
Homagama	HMA	Colombo	27.13	24.46
Panagoda	PNG	Colombo		25.6
Godagama		Colombo		
Meegoda	MGD	Colombo	15.64	29.56
Watareka	WAT	Colombo		31.26
Liyanwala		Colombo		
Padukka	PDK	Colombo	13.41	35.08
Arukwathupura	ARW	Colombo		36.8
Angampitiya	AGT	Colombo		37.92
Uggalla		Colombo		
Pinnawala	PNW	Colombo		39.92
Gammana	GMA	Colombo		41.24
Morakale	MKL	Colombo		42
Waga	WGA	Colombo	22.25	44.14
Kadugoda	KDG	Colombo		46.5
Arapanagama		Colombo		47.5
Kosgama	KSG	Colombo	22.5	49.16
Aluthambalama		Colombo		51.2
Miriswatte		Colombo		51.94
Hingurala		Colombo		53.76
Puwakpitiya	PWP	Colombo	21.95	55.24
Puwakpitiya Town		Colombo		56
Kiriwadala		Colombo		57.24
Avissawella	AVS	Colombo	39.63	58.98

All these stations are in Colombo District of Western Province

=== Northern Line ===
The line from Polgahawela Junction to Kankesanthurai

railway station	Code	District	Elevation m	Distance between Colombo Fort Km
Polgahawela Junction	PLG	Kurunegala	74.39	73.92
Girambe	GRB	Kurunegala		76.86
Thalawattegedara	TWG	Kurunegala		78.52
Potuhara	PTA	Kurunegala	117.98	84.99
Nailiya	NLY	Kurunegala		89.86
Kurunegala	KRN	Kurunegala	122.86	93.8
Muttettugala	MTG	Kurunegala		96.24
Wellawa	WEL	Kurunegala	99.39	103.42
Pinnagolla		Kurunegala		
Ganewatta	GNW	Kurunegala	126.52	115.04
Hiriyala		Kurunegala		121.72
Nagollagama	NAG	Kurunegala		127.24
Thimbiriyagedara	TIM	Kurunegala		131.11
Maho Junction	MHO	Kurunegala	92.07	136.68
Randenigama	RGA	Kurunegala		140.02
Ambanpola	ABN	Kurunegala	82.01	148.30
Galgamuwa	GLM	Kurunegala	86.58	158.28
Senarathgama	SGM	Kurunegala		168.3
Thambuttegama	TBM	Anuradhapura	92.07	176.84
Talawa	TLA	Anuradhapura	103.65	187.2
Shrawasthipura	SRP	Anuradhapura		196.18
Anuradhapura New Town	APT	Anuradhapura		199.82
Anuradhapura	ANP	Anuradhapura	79.26	202.66
Mihintale Junction		Anuradhapura	81.25	204.16
Parasangahawewa	PHW	Anuradhapura	85.67	215.4
Medagama	MEM	Anuradhapura		219.29
Siyambalagahawewa		Anuradhapura		
Medawachchiya Junction	MWH	Anuradhapura	96.03	228.56
Poonewa	PON	Anuradhapura		235.3
Eratperiakulam	EKM	Vavuniya		246.7
Vavuniya	VNA	Vavuniya	79.57	251.9
Thandikulam	TDK	Vavuniya		254.9
Omanthai	OMT	Vavuniya		264.9
Puliyankulam	PKM	Vavuniya	81.7	275.72
Mankulam		Mullaithivu	33.23	297.04
Murukandi		Mullaithivu	56.4	314
Ariviya Nagar		Mullaithivu		318.24
Kilinochchi		Kilinochchi	23.17	328
Paranthan		Kilinochchi	7.92	333.22
Elephantpass		Kilinochchi	2.13	340.16
Pallai		Kilinochchi	4.87	355.06
Eluthumadduval		Jaffna		362.4
Mirusuvil		Jaffna		367.04
Kodikamamam		Jaffna	3.65	369.9
Meesalai		Jaffna		373.48
Sankathanai		Jaffna		375.42
Chavakachcheri		Jaffna	4.26	377.14
Thachanthoppu		Jaffna		382.16
Navatkuly		Jaffna	2.74	385.82
Punkankulam		Jaffna		390.88
Jaffna	JFN	Jaffna	3.04	392.9
Kokuvil		Jaffna		395.16
Kondavil		Jaffna	6.09	397.68
Inuvil		Jaffna		400.01
Chunnakam		Jaffna	5.18	402.2
Malakkam		Jaffna		404.1
Tellippalai		Jaffna		406.58
Maviddapuram		Jaffna	7.62	408.2
Kankesanthurai	KKS	Jaffna	3.04	410.3

=== Mannar Line ===
The line from Medawachchiya Junction to Talaimannar

railway station	Code	District	Elevation m	Distance between Colombo Fort Km
Medawachchiya Junction	MWH	Anuradhapura	93	228.56
Neriyakulam		Vavuniya	70	241.46
Cheddikulam		Vavuniya	54	250.25
Madhu Road		Mannar	27.5	271.24
Murunkan		Mannar	16.5	283.76
Mathotam		Mannar	10.3	291.23
Thirukketiswaram		Mannar	4.3	297.23
Mannar		Mannar	5	306.87
Thoddaveli		Mannar	10.1	313.75
Pesalai		Mannar	9.2	321.56
Talaimannar		Mannar	7	332.36
Talaimannar Pier		Mannar	5	334.8

=== Trincomalee Line ===
This line from Gal Oya Junction to Trincomalee

railway station	Code	District	Elevation m	Distance between Colombo Fort Km
Gal Oya Junction	GOA	Polonnaruwa	86.58	224.24
Aluth oya		Polonnaruwa		233.86
Agbopura	APR	Trincomalee		249.4
Kanthale	KNI	Trincomalee	44.51	253.78
Ganthalawa	GTL	Trincomalee		261.2
Mullipothanai	MLP	Trincomalee		265.84
Thambalagamuwa	TAM	Trincomalee	11.89	272.4
China Bay	CBY	Trincomalee	3.05	287.54
Trincomalee	TCO	Trincomalee	1.83	294.08

=== Batticaloa Line ===
The line from Maho Junction to Batticaloa

railway station	Code	District	Elevation m	Distance between Colombo Fort Km
Maho Junction	MHO	Kurunegala	92.07	136.68
Yapahuwa	YPW	Kurunegala		140.98
Konwewa	KON	Kurunegala		147.14
Ranamukgama	RMA	Kurunegala		153.6
Moragollagama	MLG	Kurunegala	128.05	157.98
Siyambalagamuwa	SYA	Kurunegala		163.6
Nagama	NGM	Anuradhapura		169.32
Awukana	AWK	Anuradhapura		174
Kalawewa	KLW	Anuradhapura	115.65	177.2
Ihalagama	IHA	Anuradhapura		183.2
Kekirawa	KRA	Anuradhapura	145.73	186.22
Horiwila	HLA	Anuradhapura		197.06
Palugaswewa	PUW	Anuradhapura	160.06	201.22
Habarana	HBN	Anuradhapura	171.04	207.94
Hatares Kotuwa	HKT	Polonnaruwa		221.39
Gal Oya Junction	GOA	Polonnaruwa	86.58	224.24
Minneriya	MIY	Polonnaruwa		234.6
Hingurakgoda	HRG	Polonnaruwa	65.55	241.8
Hathamuna	HAU	Polonnaruwa		244.58
Jayanthipura	JAP	Polonnaruwa		247.2
Laksha Uyana	LYA	Polonnaruwa		248.01
Parakum Uyana	PKU	Polonnaruwa		252.5
Polonnaruwa	PLN	Polonnaruwa	45.73	257.74
Gallella	GAL	Polonnaruwa		262.16
Manampitiya	MPT	Polonnaruwa	35.67	267.6
Sevanapitiya	SVP	Polonnaruwa		276
Welikanda	WKD	Polonnaruwa	32.01	283.22
Aselapura		Polonnaruwa		
Rideethenna		Batticaloa		
Punanai	PNI	Batticaloa		299.2
Kadathasi Nagaraya	KDN	Batticaloa		313.4
Valaichchenai	VCH	Batticaloa	4.57	316.8
Kalkudah	KKH	Batticaloa		319.72
Devapuram	DPM	Batticaloa		327.76
Vandaramoolai	VML	Batticaloa		331.2
Eravur	EVR	Batticaloa	3.96	334.74
Batticaloa	BCO	Batticaloa	2.13	347.26

=== Coastal Line ===
The line from Colombo Fort to Beliatta

railway station	Code	District	Elevation m	Distance between Colombo Fort Km
Colombo Fort	FOT	Colombo	4.87	0
Secretariant Halt	SCR	Colombo		2.72
Kompannaveediya	KPN	Colombo	4.87	3.87
Kollupitiya	KLP	Colombo	3.96	5.22
Bambalapitiya	BPT	Colombo	3.65	7.22
Wellawatte	WTE	Colombo	3.35	9.32
Dehiwela	DWL	Colombo	2.43	12.02
Mount Lavinia	MLV	Colombo	4.57	14.21
Ratmalana	RML	Colombo	6.09	16.04
Angulana	AGL	Colombo	3.65	17.96
Lunawa	LNA	Colombo	3.96	19.38
Moratuwa	MRT	Colombo	4.37	20.92
Koralawella	KOR	Colombo		22.72
Egoda Uyana	EYA	Colombo	3.04	24.58
Panadura	PND	Kalutara	7.31	28.2
Pinwatte	PIN	Kalutara		31.38
Wadduwa	WDA	Kalutara	9.41	34.36
Train Halt 01	TRH	Kalutara		37.96
Kalutara North	KTN	Kalutara	11.58	41.72
Kalutara South	KTS	Kalutara	5.79	43.76
Katukurunda	KKD	Kalutara	10.97	46.54
Payagala North	PGN	Kalutara	11.58	49.9
Payagala South	PGS	Kalutara	5.79	51.14
Maggona	MGN	Kalutara	7.92	53
Beruwala	BRL	Kalutara	7.62	56.16
Hettimulla	HML	Kalutara		58.16
Aluthgama	ALT	Kalutara	7.92	61.36
Bentota	BNT	Galle		62.62
Induruwa	IDA	Galle	7.92	66.68
Maha Induruwa	MWA	Galle		69.36
Kosgoda	KDA	Galle		72.7
Piyagama	PYA	Galle		73.96
Ahungalla	AUH	Galle		75.62
Patagamgoda	PGD	Galle		77.5
Balapitiya	BPA	Galle	7.01	79.82
Andadola		Galle		
Kandegoda	KGD	Galle		83.06
Ambalangoda	ABA	Galle	10.06	84.72
Madampagama	MPA	Galle		87.36
Akurala		Galle		
Kahawe	KWE	Galle		91.14
Telwatte	TWT	Galle		
Sinigama		Galle		93.32
Hikkaduwa	HKD	Galle	6.09	96.66
Thiranagama		Galle		
Kumarakanda	KMK	Galle		101.06
Dodanduwa	DNA	Galle	6.7	102.98
Rathgama	RTG	Galle		104
Boossa	BSA	Galle		107.3
Ginthota	GNT	Galle	9.14	109.72
Piyadigama	PGM	Galle		111.3
Richmond Hill	RCH	Galle		112.82
Galle	GLE	Galle	7.01	115.42
Katugoda	KUG	Galle		119.4
Unawatuna	UNW	Galle		120.94
Talpe	TLP	Galle	6.09	125.7
Habaraduwa	HBD	Galle		128.7
Koggala	KOG	Galle		130.2
Kathaluwa	KTL	Galle		132.38
Ahangama	ANM	Galle	7.62	135.42
Midigama	MID	Matara		138.84
Kubalgama	KMB	Matara		140.8
Weligama	WLM	Matara		144.02
Polwathumodara	PLR	Matara		147.2
Mirissa	MIS	Matara		148.8
Kamburugamuwa	KMG	Matara	8.23	152.52
Walgama	WLG	Matara	7.01	153.6
Matara	MTR	Matara	7.31	157.88
Piladuwa	PLD	Matara		160.28
Weherahena	WEH	Matara		162.65
Kekandura	KER	Matara	23.17	165.01
Bambarenda	BAM	Matara	13.37	176.17
Wewurukannala	WEW	Matara		178.17
Nakulugamuwa		Hambantota		
Beliatta	BEL	Hambantota	28.69	185.17

== See also ==
- List of railway stations in Sri Lanka
