= Great Western railway station =

Railway station in Sri Lanka

Great Western Railway Station
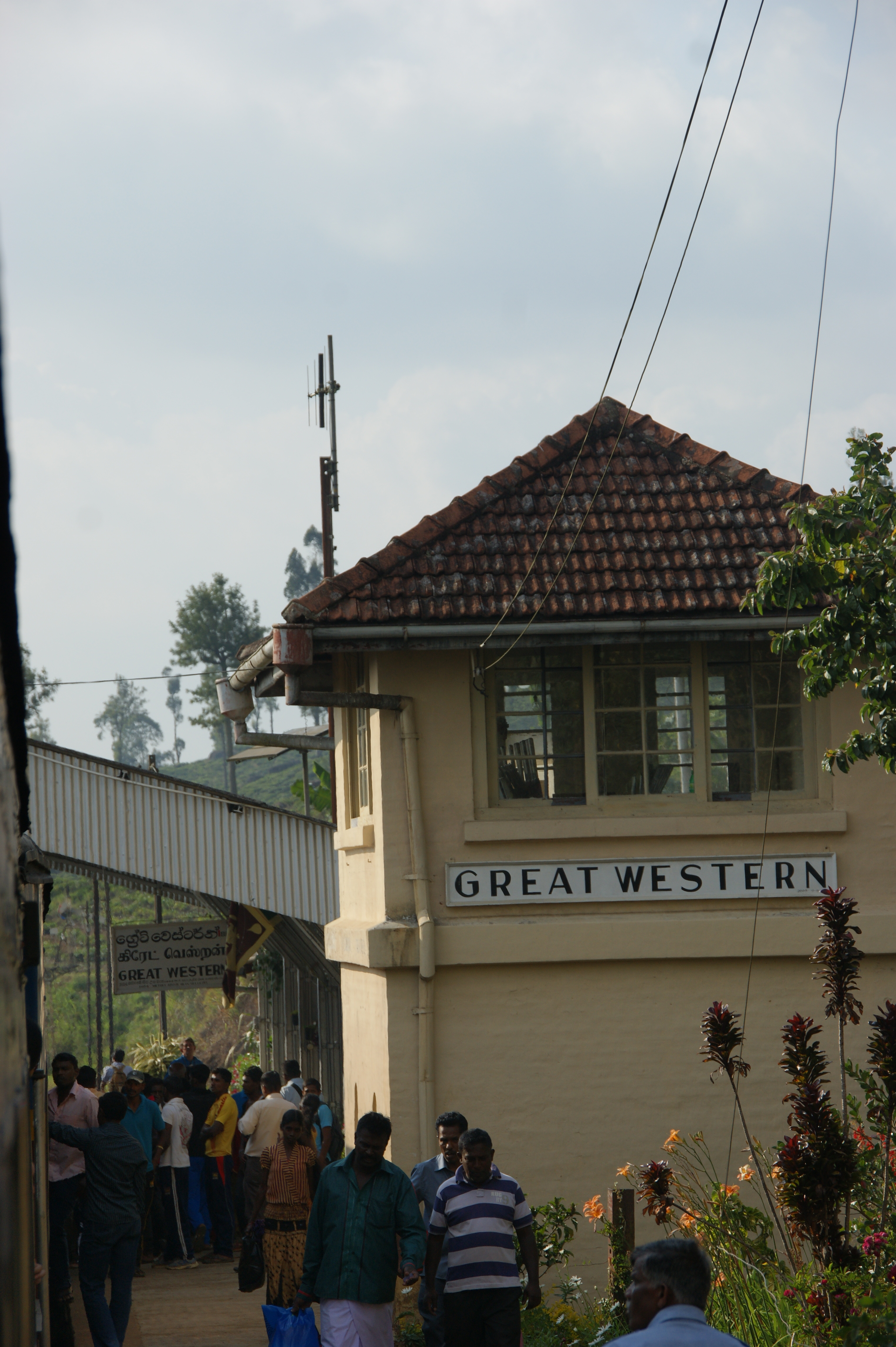
- Great Western railway station (2014)

General information
- Location: Talawakelle; Sri Lanka
- Coordinates: 6°57′21″N 80°41′15″E
- System: Railway Station
- Owner: Sri Lanka Railways
- Operator: Sri Lanka Railways
- Line: Main Line
- Distance: 199.3 km (123.8 mi) (from Fort)
- Platforms: 2
- Tracks: 2

Other information
- Status: Functioning
- Station code: GWN

History
- Opened: 1890; 136 years ago
- Electrified: No
Location

Great Western railway station is the 61st railway station on the Main Line (which runs between Colombo and Badulla), and is 199.3 km (123.8 mi) away from Colombo.

It is located at the Great Western estate of Nuwara Eliya District and is situated 1,455.5 m (4,775 ft) above sea level. This railway station lies between the Watagoda and Radella railway stations. The station has two platforms with a second track as a siding loop. All the trains that run on the Main Line, including the Podi Menike and Udarata Menike express trains stop at the station.

The railway station was constructed to service the Great Western Estate, a 628 ha (1,550 acres) tea plantation in the foothills of the Great Western Mountain. The estate was originally established by J. A. Rossiter in 1866. In 1883 the estate was predominately a coffee plantation owned and operated by Dent Brothers & Co. In 1893 following the construction of the railway station the ownership of the estate was transferred to the Great Western Tea Company of Ceyon, Ltd.

== Continuity ==
Preceding station	Sri Lanka Railways	Following station
Watagoda	Main Line	Radella

== See also ==
- List of railway stations in Sri Lanka
- List of railway stations by line order in Sri Lanka
