= Kantale railway station =

Railway station in Kantalai, Sri Lanka

Kantale කන්තලේ கந்தளாய்

General information
- Location: Kantale; Sri Lanka
- Coordinates: 8°21′22.60″N 81°00′22.30″E
- System: Sri Lankan Railway Station
- Owner: Sri Lanka Railways
- Line: Trincomalee line

Other information
- Status: Functioning
- Station code: KNL
Location

Kantale railway station (Sinhala: කන්තලේ, romanized: Kantalē; Tamil: கந்தளாய், romanized: Kantaḷāy) is a railway station in the town of Kantale in eastern Sri Lanka. Owned by Sri Lanka Railways, the state-owned railway operator, the station is part of the Trincomalee line which links Trincomalee District with the capital Colombo. It is 256.83 km (159.59 mi) from Colombo fort station.

== Services ==
Preceding station	Sri Lanka Railways	Following station
Akbopura	Trincomalee line	Ganthalawa

== See also ==
- List of railway stations in Sri Lanka
- List of railway stations in Sri Lanka by line
