= Ukuwela railway station =

Railway station in Sri Lanka

Ukuwela railway station උකුවෙල දුම්රිය ස්ථානය

General information
- Location: Wattegama - Matale Road, Ukuwela; Sri Lanka
- Coordinates: 7°25′13″N 80°38′2″E
- Elevation: 394 m (1,293 ft)
- System: Sri Lankan Railway Station
- Owner: Sri Lanka Railways
- Line: Matale Line
- Tracks: 2

Other information
- Status: Functioning
- Station code: UKL

History
- Opened: 14 October 1880
Location

Ukuwela Railway Station (Sinhala: උකුවෙල දුම්රිය ස්ථානය) is a railway station on the Matale railway line of Sri Lanka. It is the 65th railway station on the line from Colombo Fort railway station and is located in the Matale District in the Central Province. It is 141.6 kilometres (88.0 mi) from the Colombo Fort Railway Station and 28 km (17 mi) from the Kandy Railway Station. The station was opened on 14 October 1880 following the construction of a branch line from Kandy to Matale.

== Location ==
Ukuwela station is located on the B462 (Wattegama - Matale) Road, approximately 5.8 km (4 mi) south of Matale.

== Continuity ==
Preceding station	Sri Lanka Railways	Following station
Elwala	Matale Line	Udaththawela
