= VGD =

VGD may refer to:

- VGD, the IATA airport code for Vologda Airport, Russia
- VGD, the Sri Lanka Railways station code for Veyangoda railway station, Western Province, Sri Lanka
