= Walasgala =

Coordinates: 05°59′28″N 80°42′07″E

Walasgala is a town on the far south coast of Sri Lanka, in Southern province. The distance from Walasgala to the capital city of Colombo is approximately 141 km / 87 mi. The climate is tropical rainforest.

Latitude	6° 39' 39" N
Longitude	81° 10' 37" E

== Transport ==
In 2007, a railway line is being built to and through the town.

== See also ==
- List of railway stations in Sri Lanka
