= Punanai railway station =

Railway station in Punanai, Sri Lanka

Punanai railway station புனானை මධු පාර දුම්රිය ස්ථානය

General information
- Location: Punanai; Sri Lanka
- Coordinates: 7°57′49.20″N 81°23′14.10″E
- System: Sri Lankan Railway Station
- Owner: Sri Lanka Railways
- Line: Batticaloa Line

Other information
- Status: Functioning
Location

Punanai railway station is a railway station in the town of Punanai in eastern Sri Lanka. Owned by Sri Lanka Railways, the state-owned railway operator, the station is part of the Batticaloa Line which links Batticaloa District with the capital Colombo.

== Services ==
Preceding station	Sri Lanka Railways	Following station
Welikanda	Batticaloa Line	Valaichchenai

== See also ==
- List of railway stations in Sri Lanka
- List of railway stations by line order in Sri Lanka
