= Valaichchenai railway station =

Railway station in Valaichchenai, Sri Lanka

Valaichchenai railway station வாழைச்சேனை ரயில் நிலையம் වාලසේන දුම්රිය ස්ථානය

General information
- Location: Valaichchenai; Sri Lanka
- Coordinates: 07°54′37″N 81°31′55″E
- System: Sri Lankan Railway Station
- Owner: Sri Lanka Railways
- Line: Batticaloa Line

Other information
- Status: Functioning
Location

Valaichchenai railway station Tamil: வாழைச்சேனை ரயில் நிலையம்), (Sinhala: වලයිචෙනෙයි දුම්රිය ස්ථානය) is a railway station in the town of Valaichchenai in eastern Sri Lanka. Owned by Sri Lanka Railways, the state-owned railway operator, the station is part of the Batticaloa Line which links Batticaloa District with the capital Colombo.

== Services ==
Preceding station	Sri Lanka Railways	Following station
Punanai	Batticaloa Line	Kalkudah

== See also ==
- List of railway stations in Sri Lanka
- List of railway stations by line order in Sri Lanka
