= Haputale railway station =

Railway station in Sri Lanka

Haputale Railway Station හපුතලේ දුම්රිය ස්ථානය ஹப்புடேல் ரயில் நிலையம்
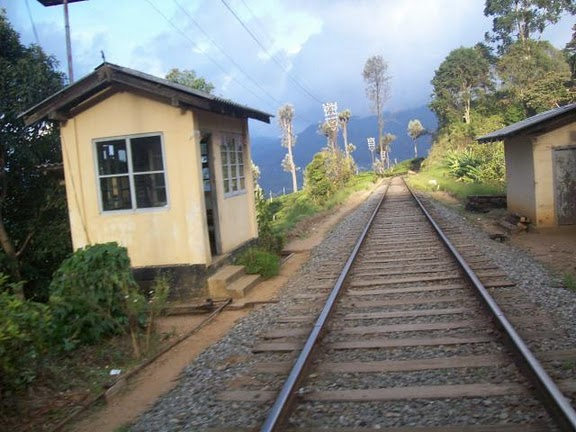
- Railway line near Haputale railway station (2010)

General information
- Location: Station Road, Haputale; Sri Lanka
- Coordinates: 6.7683°N 80.9576°E
- System: Railway Station
- Owner: Sri Lanka Railways
- Operator: Sri Lanka Railways
- Line: Main Line
- Distance: 247.97 km (154.08 mi) (from Fort)
- Platforms: 1
- Tracks: 2

Other information
- Status: Functioning
- Station code: HPT

History
- Opened: 19 June 1893
- Electrified: No
Location

Haputale Railway Station (Sinhala: හපුතලේ දුම්රිය ස්ථානය, Tamil: ஹப்புடேல் ரயில் நிலையம்) is the 69th station on the Main Line. The station is located between Idalgashinna and Diyatalawa railway stations in Badulla District, Uva Province. It is located 247.97 km (154.08 mi) from Colombo Fort railway station at an elevation of 1,479.57 m (4,854.2 ft) above sea level.

The station has one platform with a siding and all the trains that operate on the line stop at the station. The station opened on 19 June 1893, following the extension of the main line from Nanu Oya railway station to Haputale. In 1894 the rail line was extended from Haputale to Banderawela.

== Continuity ==
Preceding station	Sri Lanka Railways	Following station
Diyatalawa	Main Line	Idalgashinna

== See also ==
- List of railway stations in Sri Lanka
- List of railway stations by line order in Sri Lanka
