= Ganthalawa railway station =

Railway station in Ganthalawa in eastern Sri Lanka

Ganthalawa ගන්තලාව கந்தலவா

General information
- Location: Ganthalawa; Sri Lanka
- Coordinates: 8°25′02.04″N 81°02′13.74″E
- System: Sri Lankan Railway Station
- Owner: Sri Lanka Railways
- Line: Trincomalee Line

Other information
- Status: Functioning

History
- Opened: 5 May 2008
Location

Ganthalawa railway station (Sinhala: ගන්තලාව, Tamil: கந்தலவா) is a railway station in the town of Ganthalawa in eastern Sri Lanka. Owned by Sri Lanka Railways, the state-owned railway operator, the station is part of the Trincomalee Line, which links Trincomalee District with the capital Colombo.

The station was officially opened on 5 May 2008 by the Minister of Transport, Dullas Alahapperuma, as part of the government's "Eastern Reawakening" program.

== Services ==
Preceding station	Sri Lanka Railways	Following station
Kanthalai	Trincomalee Line	Thambalagamuwa

== See also ==
- List of railway stations in Sri Lanka
- List of railway stations by line order in Sri Lanka
