= Gampaha railway station =

Railway station in Gampaha, Sri Lanka

Gampaha Railway Station

General information
- Location: Gampaha; Sri Lanka
- Coordinates: 07°05′36.8″N 79°59′37.3″E
- Owner: Sri Lanka Railways
- Line: Main Line

Other information
- Station code: GPH
Location

Gampaha railway station is a railway station in the western city of Gampaha in Sri Lanka. The station is served by Sri Lanka Railways, which is the state-run railway operator.

== Location ==
Gampaha railway station is located in the centre of Gampaha and is located next to the Henarathgoda Botanical Garden. Also Bandaranaike International Airport and Colombo Fort Station are about 15 and 28 kilometres away from Gampaha railway station respectively. It is the 15th station on the Main Line from Colombo Fort railway station with elevation of 10.97m high above mean sea level.

Station has three platforms and one siding line with two crossing loops and they are designed as a commuter rail terminus.

== History ==
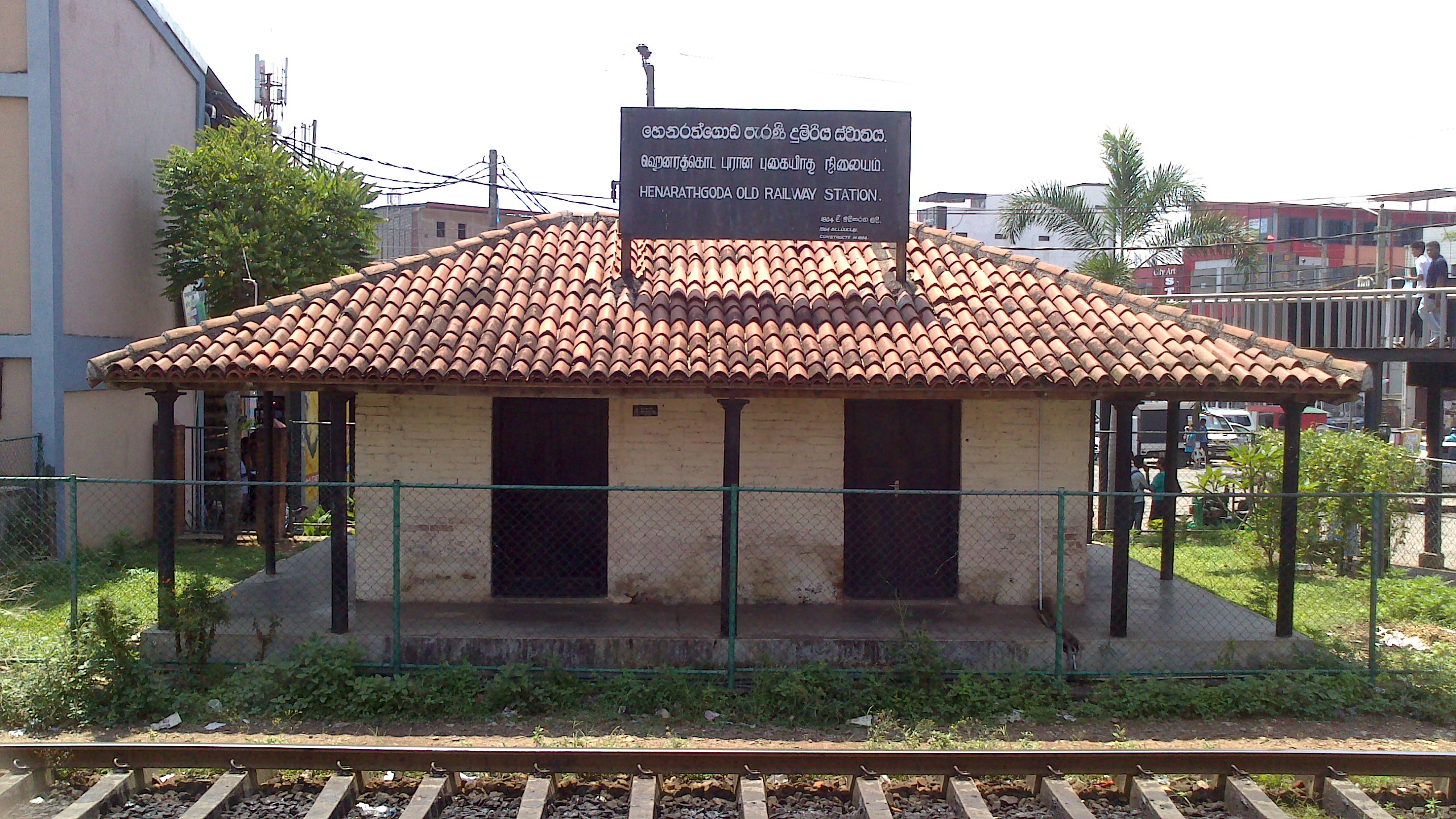
Henarathgoda old railway station

In 1864, British colonists built this station as Henarathgoda railway station to facilitate the transportation of Tea and Coffee from the hill country to Colombo. In 1926, the station upgraded with double rail line and became a main railway station in the country.

Later, the original station abandoned and it moved to current location with its present name, Gampaha railway station. But old Henarathgoda station is still visible on the line approximately 100 m away from the present station. Currently this old Henarathgoda Railway Station Building serve as the Department of Archaeology Gampaha regional office.

== Continuity ==
Preceding station	Sri Lanka Railways	Following station
Daraluwa	Main Line	Yagoda

== See also ==
- List of railway stations in Sri Lanka
- List of railway stations in Sri Lanka by line
- Sri Lanka Railways
