= Kodikamam railway station =

Railway station in Kodikamam, Sri Lanka

Kodikamam Railway Station கொடிகாமம் කොඩිකාමම්
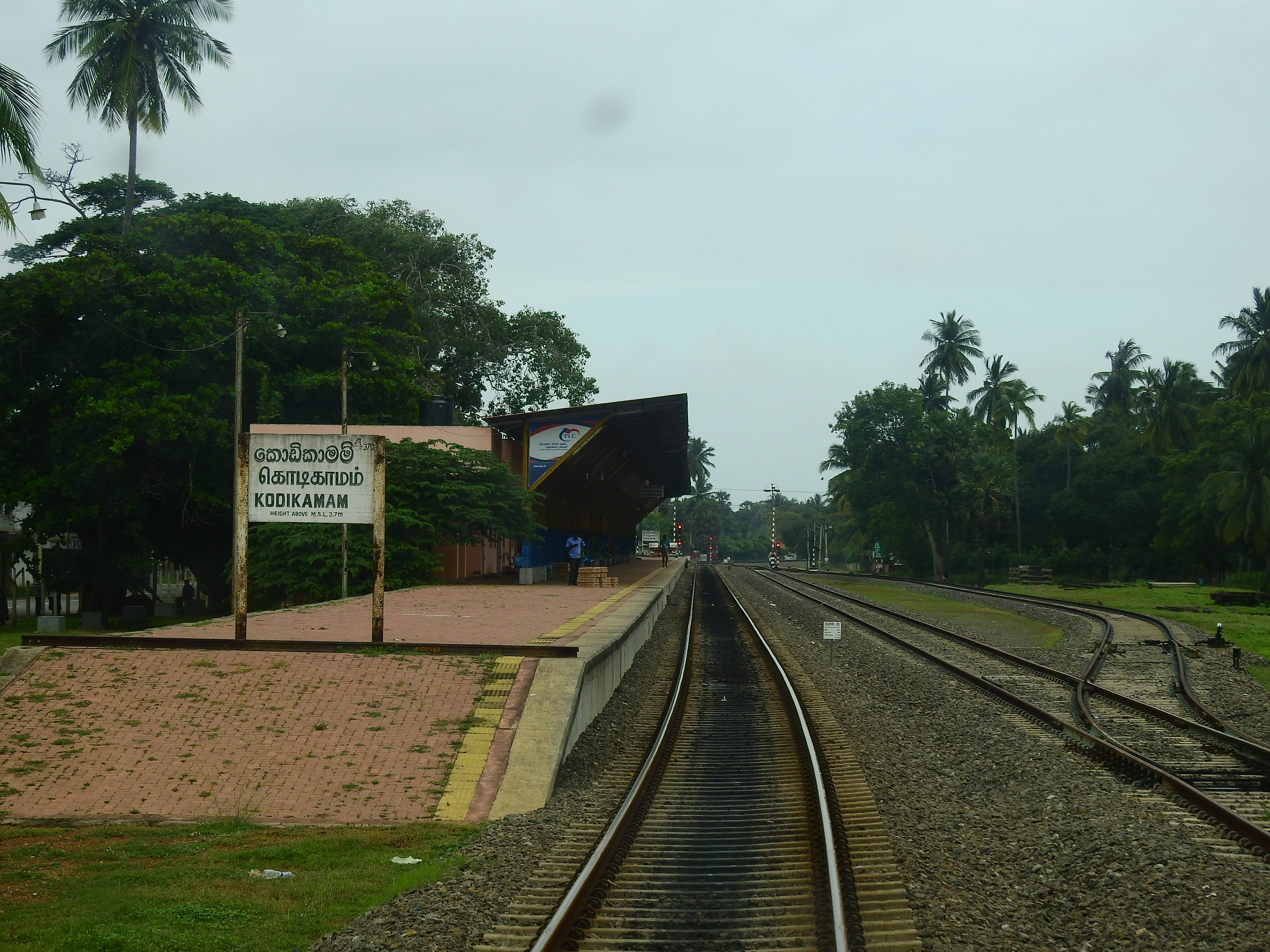
- Kodikamam Railway Station, Sri Lanka

General information
- Location: Kodikamam; Sri Lanka
- Coordinates: 9°40′53.00″N 80°13′10.00″E
- System: Sri Lankan Railway Station
- Owner: Sri Lanka Railways
- Line: Northern line

Other information
- Status: Functioning

History
- Rebuilt: 13 October 2014
Route map
Location

Kodikamam railway station (Tamil: கொடிகாமம் தொடருந்து நிலையம்) is a railway station in the town of Kodikamam in northern Sri Lanka. Owned by Sri Lanka Railways, the state-owned railway operator, the station is part of the Northern Line which links the north with the capital Colombo. The station was not functioning between 1990 and 2015 due to the civil war. This service Kankesanthurai was re-opened on 2 January 2015.

== Services ==
The following train services are available from/to the station:

←	Service	→
Meesalai; Chunnakam from	4002; Yal Devi	Kodikamam; Colombo Fort towart
Pallai; Colombo Fort from	4017; Intercity	Chavakachcheri; Kankesanthurai towart
Chavakachcheri; Kankesanthuraifrom	4018; Intercity	Pallai; Colombo fort towart
