= Idalgashinna railway station =

Railway station in Sri Lanka

Idalgashinna Railway Station ඉදල්ගස්හින්න දුම්රිය ස්ථානය இடல்கஷின்னா ரயில் நிலையம்
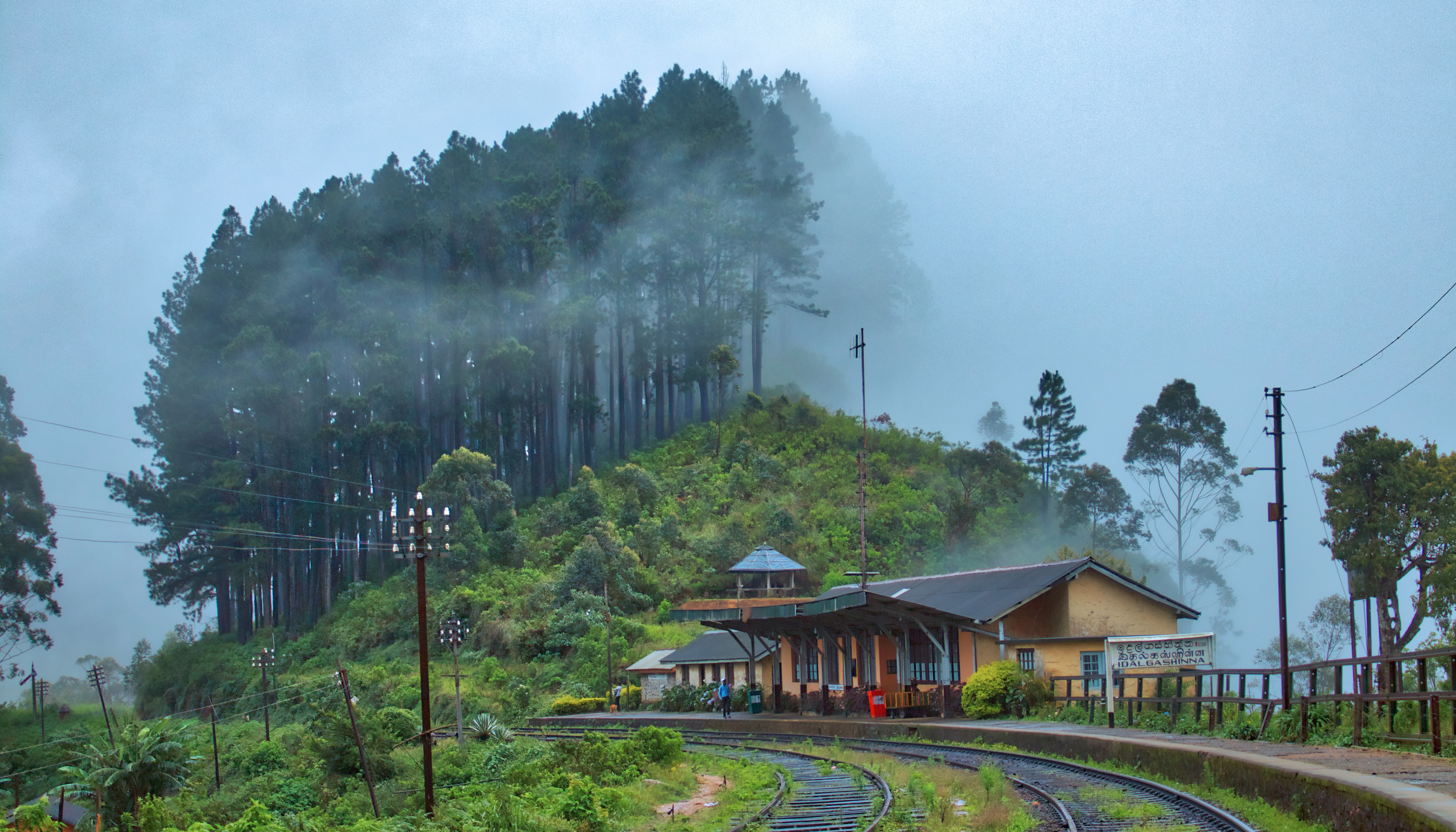
- Idalgashinna railway station (2017)

General information
- Location: Sri Lanka
- Coordinates: 6.779413°N 80.896857°E
- System: Railway Station
- Owner: Sri Lanka Railways
- Operator: Sri Lanka Railways
- Line: Main Line
- Distance: 240.28 km (149.30 mi) (from Fort)
- Platforms: 1
- Tracks: 2

Other information
- Status: Functioning
- Station code: IGH

History
- Electrified: No
Location

Idalgashinna Railway Station (ඉදල්ගස්හින්න දුම්රිය ස්ථානය), Tamil: இடல்கஷின்னா ரயில் நிலையம்) is the 68th station on the Main Line, and fifth highest railway station in Sri Lanka located between Haputale and Ohiya railway stations in Badulla District, Uva Province. It is located 8 km (5.0 mi) west of Haputale, at an elevation of 1,615 metres (5,299 ft) above sea level. The station was built after the track was extended in 1893, from the Nanu Oya railway station to Haputale. This is the 68th railway station on the Colombo-Badulla railway line. The railway station is located on a hilltop separating the southern and eastern parts of Sri Lanka. Because of this the environment is constantly foggy and instantly clear. Depending on the location, rainwater from the Idalgashinna railway station collects in front of the roof to the Mahaweli river valley and water falling from the back of the roof to the Walawe river valley.

The 5 ft 6 in (1,676 mm) broad-gauge main line between Haputale and Idalgashinna is regarded to have a notably scenic view due to the land falling away steeply both sides. The view on the northern side of the station extends beyond Boralanda and Welimada up to Udupussellawa and Hakgala, with the southern side encompassing Beragala down to the coast at Hambantota and the Udawalawa reservoir clearly visible.

It is serviced by the express trains such as Podi Menike, Udarata Menike and Night mail train, as well as all local trains running on the main line.

There are 14 tunnels between the Ohiya and Idalgashinna railway stations.

== Continuity ==
Preceding station	Sri Lanka Railways	Following station
Haputale	Main Line	Ohiya

== See also ==
- List of railway stations in Sri Lanka
- List of railway stations by line order in Sri Lanka
