= Habaraduwa =

Habaraduwa හබරාදුව
- Town
- Location within Sri Lanka
- Coordinates: 5°59′55″N 80°18′34″E
- Country: Sri Lanka
- Province: Southern Province
- District: Galle District

Area
  - Total: 53 km^{2} (20 sq mi)

Population (March 2012)
  - Total: 62,389
  - Density: 1,177/km^{2} (3,050/sq mi)
- Time zone: UTC+5:30 (Sri Lanka Standard Time)

Habaraduwa (Sinhala: හබරාදුව) is a town in the Galle District, Southern Province, Sri Lanka.

It is located on the southern coast, approximately 14 km (8.7 mi) south of Galle. The religious composition in Habaraduwa DS Division according to 2012 census data is Buddhists 61,847-99.13%, Other Christians 232-0.37%, Roman Catholics 221-0.35%, Hindus 55-0.09%, Islam 28-0.04%, and Others 6-0.01%.

== See also ==
- Habaraduwa railway station
- List of towns in Southern Province, Sri Lanka
