= Wattegama railway station =

Railway station in Sri Lanka

Wattegama railway station වත්තේගම දුම්රිය ස්ථානය

General information
- Location: Pitiyagedera - Wattegama - Iriyagastenne Road, Wattegama; Sri Lanka
- Coordinates: 7°21′01.8″N 80°40′57.4″E
- Elevation: 494 m (1,621 ft)
- System: Sri Lankan Railway Station
- Owner: Sri Lanka Railways
- Line: Matale Line
- Tracks: 2

Other information
- Status: Functioning
- Station code: WGA

History
- Opened: 14 October 1880
Location

Wattegama Railway Station (Sinhala: වත්තේගම දුම්රිය ස්ථානය) is a railway station on the Matale railway line of Sri Lanka. It is the 62nd railway station on the line from Colombo Fort railway station and is located in the Kandy District in the Central Province. It is 133 kilometres (83 mi) from the Colombo Fort Railway Station and 18.2 km (11 mi) from the Kandy Railway Station. The station was opened on 14 October 1880 following the construction of a branch line from Kandy to Matale. It was established to primarily serve the growing number of cacao and tea estates in the area. In the early 1900s it was estimated that a 1,000 t (2,200,000 lb) of cocoa beans and 3,630 t (8,000,000 lb) of tea moved through this station.

== Location ==
Wattegama station is located on the B369 (Pitiyagedera - Wattegama - Iriyagastenne) Road, approximately 151 km (94 mi) south of Matale.

== Continuity ==
Preceding station	Sri Lanka Railways	Following station
Uda Thalawinna	Matale Line	Yatawara
