= Watagoda =

Town in Central Province, Sri Lanka

- Country: Sri Lanka
- Province: Central Province
- District: Nuwara Eliya District

Government
  - Type: Pradeshiya Sabha
  - Administered by: Kotagala Pradeshiya Sabha
- Time zone: UTC+5:30 (Sri Lanka Standard Time)
- Postal code: 22110

Watagoda is a small town in the Nuwara Eliya District, Central Province, Sri Lanka.

Watagoda is administered by the Kotagala Pradeshiya Sabha.

== See also ==
- List of towns in Central Province, Sri Lanka
