= Chavakachcheri railway station =

Railway station in Sri Lanka

Chavakachcheri சாவகச்சேரி චාවකච්චේරි
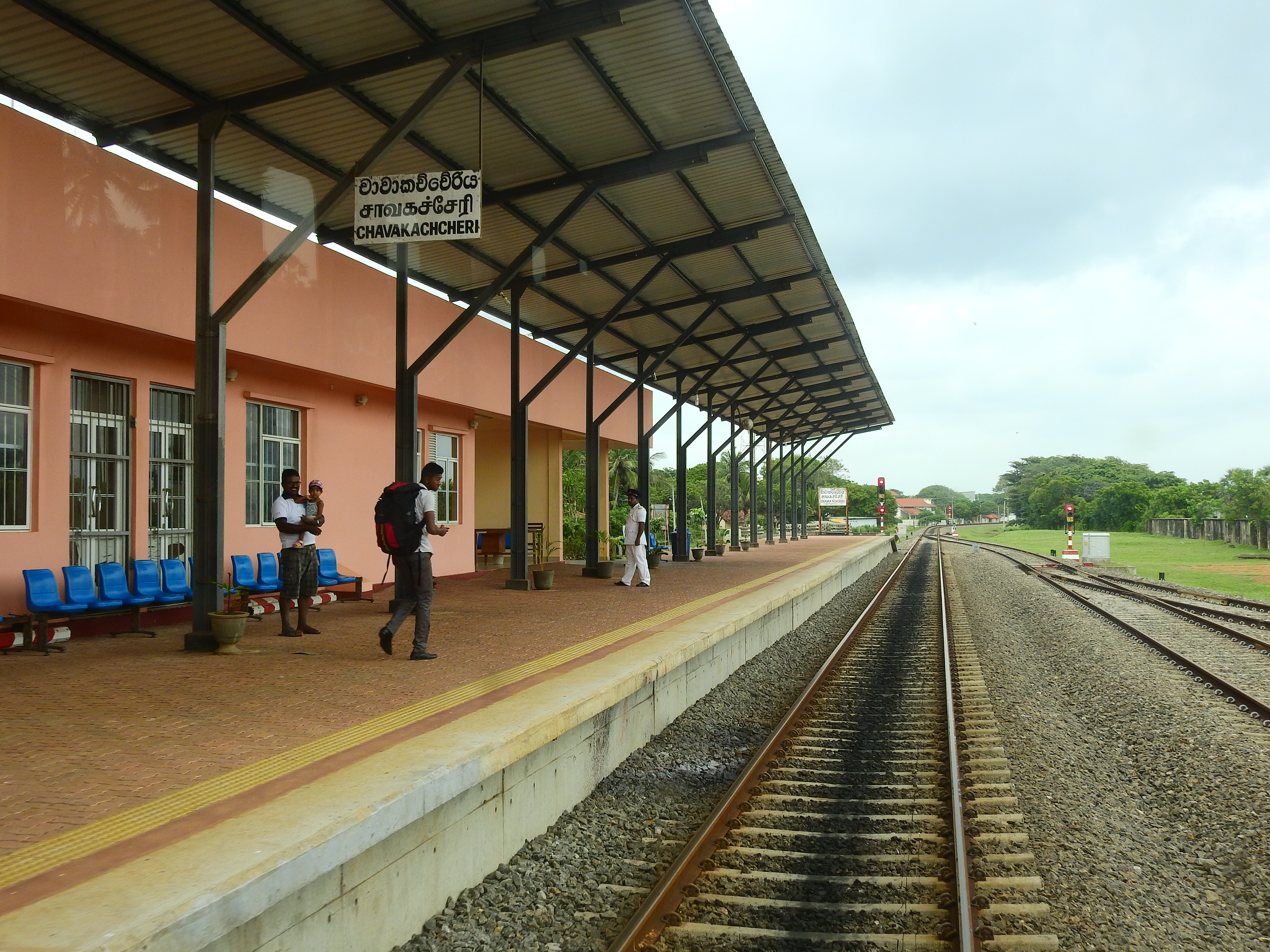
- The station in December 2019

General information
- Location: Chavakachcheri; Sri Lanka
- Coordinates: 9°39′25.60″N 80°09′30.50″E
- System: Sri Lankan Railway Station
- Owner: Sri Lanka Railways
- Line: Northern Line

Other information
- Status: functioning

History
- Opened: 11 March 1902
- Closed: 13 July 1990
- Rebuilt: 4 March 2014

Services
Yal Devi Express Train
Uttara Devi Intercity Express Train
Sri Devi Intercity Express Train
Yal Rani
Route map
Location
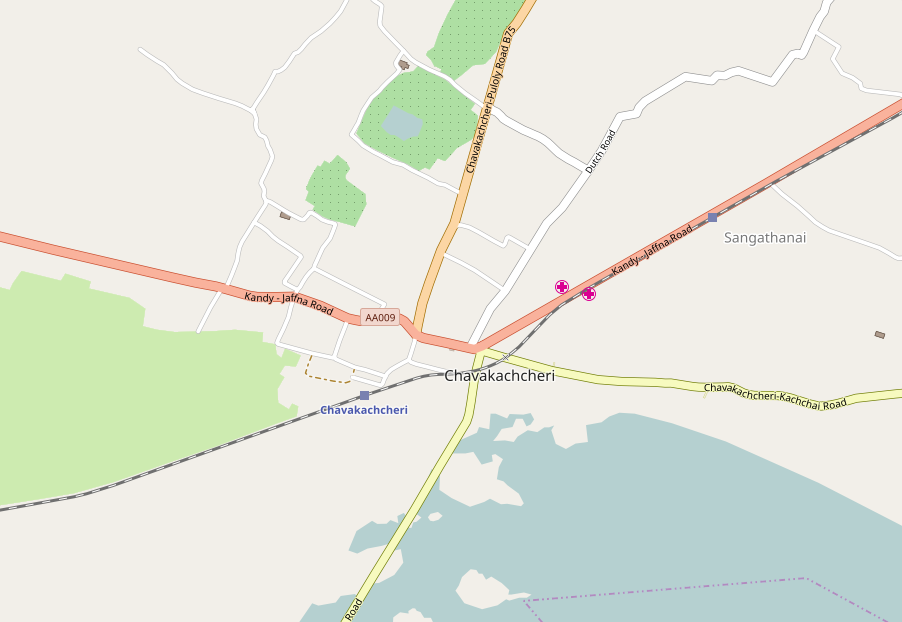
- Location within Chavakachcheri

Chavakachcheri railway station is a railway station in the town of Chavakachcheri in northern Sri Lanka. Owned by Sri Lanka Railways, the state-owned railway operator, the station is part of the Northern Line which links the north with the capital Colombo. The popular Yarl Devi service stops at the station.

The station was opened, following the completion of the 34 kilometres (21 mi) Kankesanthurai-Chavakacheri section of the railway. This section was officially opened by Governor Sir J. W. Ridgeway on 11 March 1902. The 23 kilometres (14 mi) Chavakacheri-Pallai section was opened on 5 September 1902.

In 1982 the station was attacked by the Liberation Tigers of Tamil Eelam, stealing Rs. 84,000.

In 1990 the Northern Line and the station was closed, due to the civil war. The line and the station re-opened in 2014.

== See also ==
- List of railway stations in Sri Lanka
- List of railway stations by line order in Sri Lanka
