= Veyangoda railway station =

Railway station in Sri Lanka

Veyangoda Railway Station
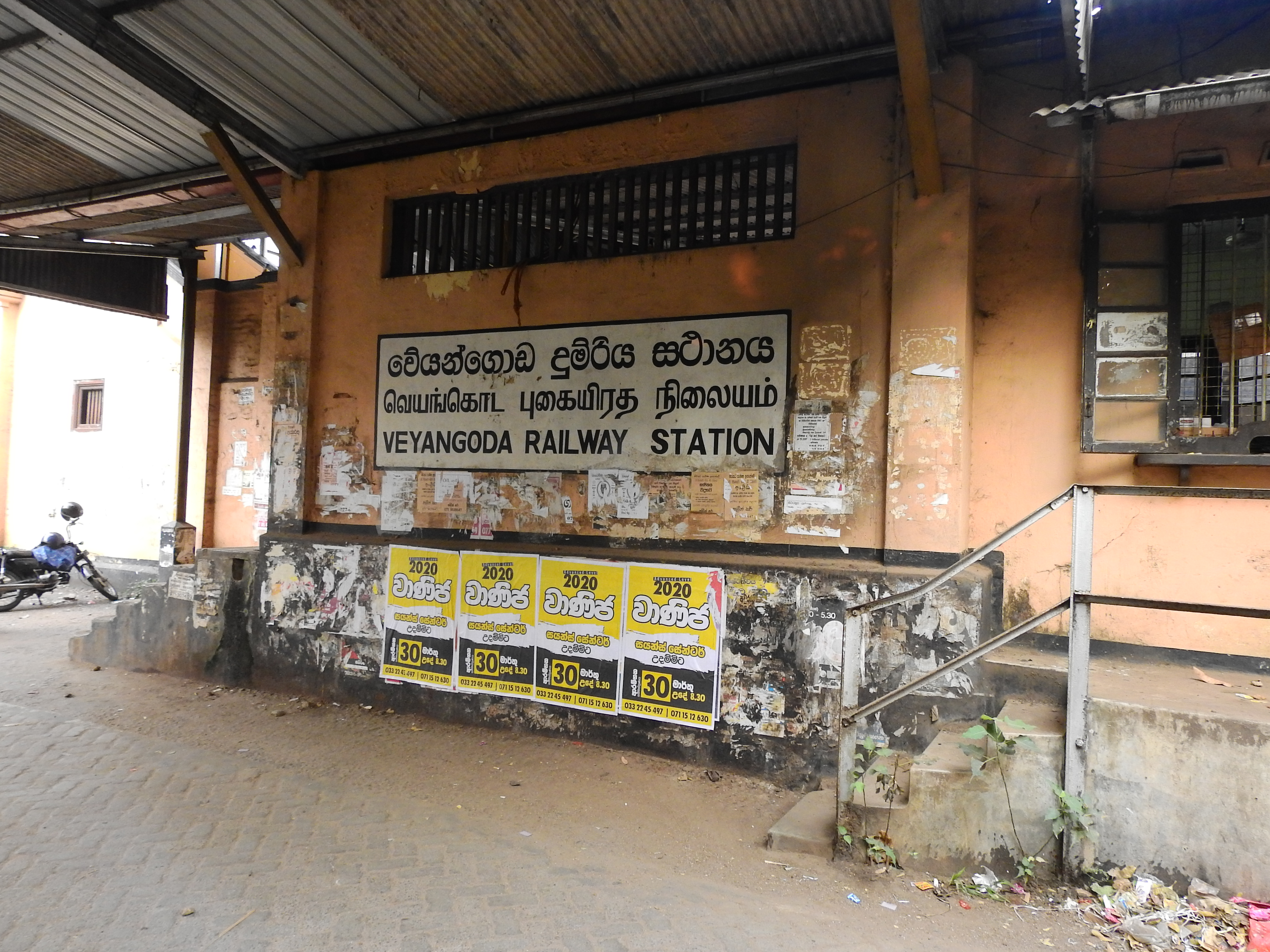

General information
- Location: Ruwanwella Road, Veyangoda; Sri Lanka
- Coordinates: 07°09′9.6282″N 80°03′30.3282″E
- Owner: Sri Lanka Railways
- Line: Main Line
- Platforms: Four
- Tracks: Six

Construction
- Parking: Yes
- Cycle facilities: Yes

Other information
- Station code: VGD
- Fare zone: Attanagalle

History
- Opened: 27 December 1864
Location

Veyangoda railway station is a railway station in the Western Province, Sri Lanka. The station is served by Sri Lanka Railways, which is the state-run railway operator.

== Location ==
Veyangoda railway station is located in the centre of the town of Veyangoda. It is the 20th station on the Main Line and 37.48 km (23.29 mi) from the Colombo Fort railway station at an elevation of 18.59 m (61.0 ft) above mean sea level. Veyangoda railway station is one of the busiest stations in the Gampaha District, with most of the trains including some intercity express stopping at the station. Next to station, there is road crossing, which has the highest number of crossings in Sri Lanka.

The station has four platforms and one siding line with crossing loop and functions as a commuter rail terminus.

== History ==
The station is one of the first five railway stations constructed in Sri Lanka. The original station was opened on 27 December 1864, when the first passenger train, carrying the Duke of Brabant, Leopold II, and operated by Guilford Lindsey Molesworth (Chief Railway Engineer), ran from Veyangoda to Ambepussa and returned to Colombo. The line however wasn't officially opened for traffic until 2 October 1865 and the Veyangoda station wasn't completed until 1866.

In 2016 the Minister of Transport and Civil Aviation, Nimal Siripala de Silva, announced that the government would be electrifying the railway line from Veyangoda to Panadura over the next three years.

== Continuity ==
Preceding station	Sri Lanka Railways	Following station
Heendeniya Pattiyagoda	Main Line	Wadurawa

== See also ==
- List of railway stations in Sri Lanka
- List of railway stations in Sri Lanka by line
- Sri Lanka Railways
