= Radella railway station =

Railway station in Sri Lanka

Radella

General information
- Location: Radella; Sri Lanka
- Coordinates: 6.9448°N 80.7167°E
- Operated by: Sri Lanka Railways
- Line: Main line
- Distance: 203.16 km (126.2 mi) from Colombo
- Platforms: 1 side platform

Other information
- Station code: RDL

History
- Opened: 1890; 136 years ago
Location

Radella railway station (Sinhala: රදැල්ල දුම්රිය ස්ථානය) is the 62nd railway station on the Main Line, and is 203.16 km (126.24 mi) away from Colombo. It is located between the Nanu Oya and Great Western railway stations and at 1,575.31 m (5,168.3 ft) above sea level. The station was opened in 1890.

The station has one platform and most trains including Podi Menike and Udarata Menike express trains service the station.

== Continuity ==
Preceding station	Sri Lanka Railways	Following station
Great Western	Main Line	Nanu Oya
