= Peradeniya Junction railway station =

Railway station in Sri Lanka

Peradeniya Junction
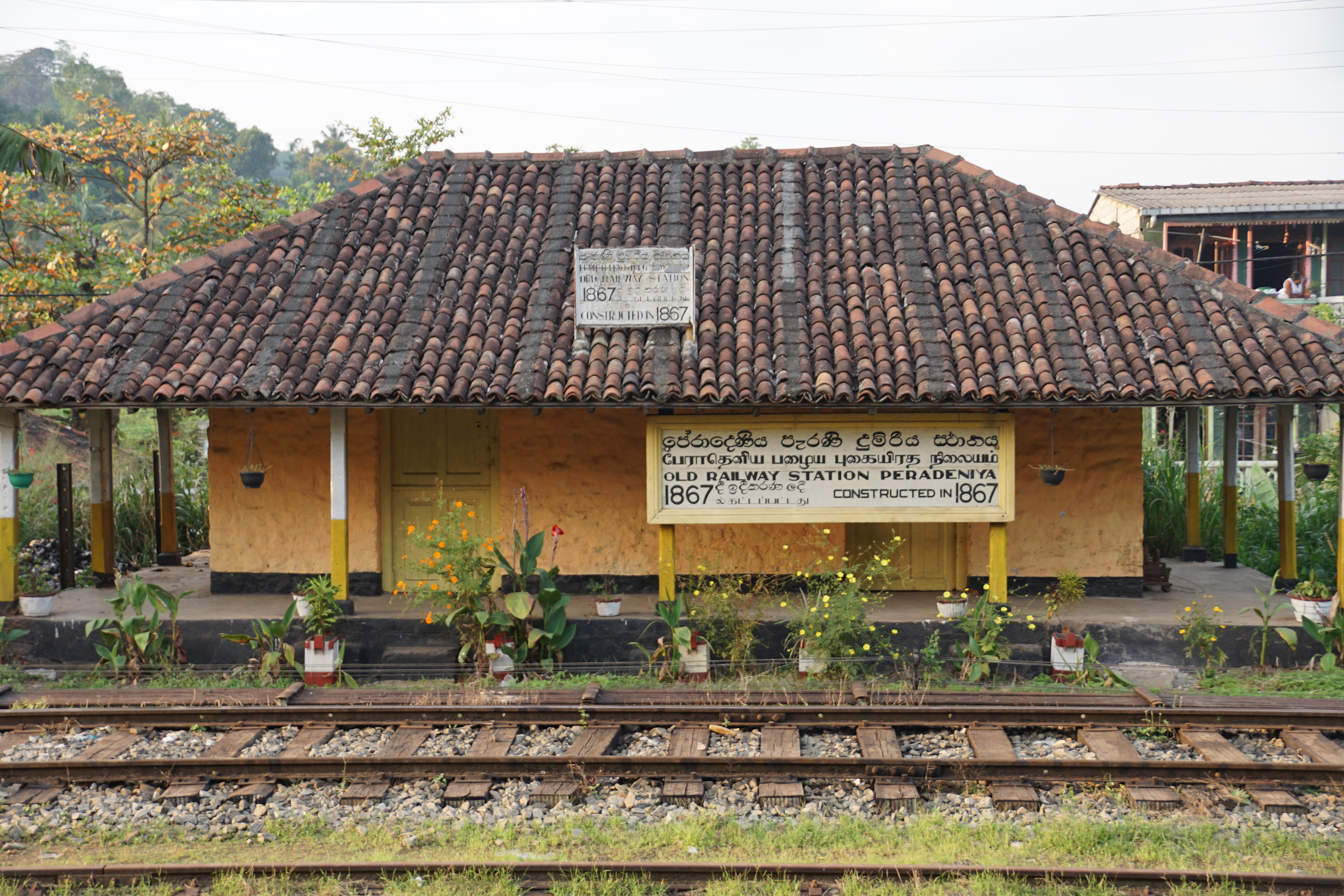
- The former railway station building at Peradeniya Junction

General information
- Location: Sri Lanka
- System: Sri Lankan Railway Station
- Owner: Sri Lanka Railways
- Lines: Main Line; Matale Line
- Platforms: 3

Other information
- Status: Functioning
- Station code: PPL

History
- Opened: 1867
Location

Peradeniya Junction (Sinhala: පේරාදෙණිය හන්දිය දුම්රිය ස්ථානය) is a railway station on the Main railway line of Sri Lanka, situated between Kathaluwa and Koshinna railway stations. It is the 45th railway station on the Main line and situated about 115 kilometres (71 mi) away from the Colombo Fort Railway Station, at an elevation of about 476 metres (1,562 ft) above sea level. It is an important railway junction in Sri Lanka Railways' network, connecting the Main Line, which runs from Colombo to Badulla and the Matale Line, which runs from Peradeniya to Matale via Kandy.

== History ==
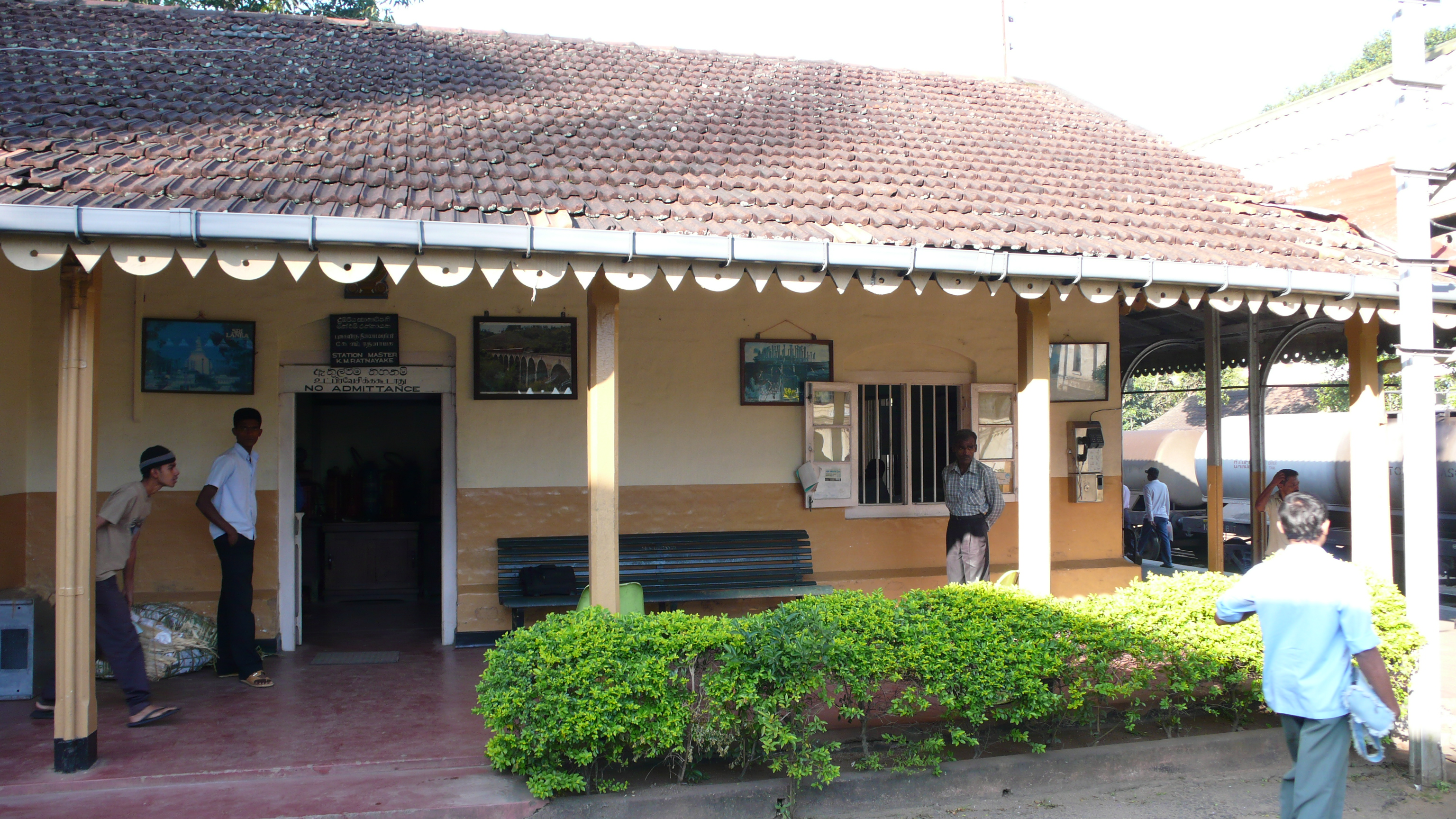
Station master's office, Peradeniya Junction railway station

Peradeniya railway station is one of the oldest railway stations in Sri Lanka, opening in 1867 when the rail line was extended from Ambepussa to Kandy, as a part of the first train route which connected Colombo to Kandy. The original railway station building is constructed with 42 cm (17 in) wide stone and lime walls, and is 11.5 m × 6.9 m (38 ft × 23 ft). It comprises two rooms and a surrounding verandah and timber pillars, with hip roof, covered with round clay tiles. The building now serves as a storehouse.

Initially the station was not a railway junction station. On 15 January 1873 it became a junction station, with the construction of a rail line from Peradeniya to Gampola, resulting in the station being renamed the Peradeniya Junction Railway Station.

The station initially had two platforms and type of the railway junction was Y-shaped track arrangement, which meant that train routing from one line to the other line required the train to reverse. Sri Lanka Railways subsequently upgraded the junction railway network to its current Triangular track configuration, as well as constructing an additional platform separate from the main station. The result being that trains can be routed from any line to any other line, without reversing the train. The new third platform opened on 1 December 2008. Generally, Platform One and Two serve the trains of Matale line and Main line. Platform Three is used for inbound and outbound services to the Main line. The majority of all long distance and local trains stop at the station.

== Continuity ==
Preceding station	Sri Lanka Railways	Following station
Barammane	Main Line	Koshinna
Terminus	Matale Line	Sarasavi Uyana
