= Ukuwela =

Ukuwela උකුවෙල உக்குவளை
- Suburb
- Matale Metropolitan Region
- Location within Sri Lanka
- Coordinates: 7°25′16.4″N 80°38′1.0″E
- Country: Sri Lanka
- Province: Central Province
- District: Matale District
- Division: Ukuwela Division

Government
  - Type: Ukuwela Pradeshiya Sabha

Area
  - Total: 77.00 km^{2} (29.73 sq mi)
- Elevation: 383 m (1,257 ft)

Population (2012)
  - Total: 68,027
  - Density: 883.5/km^{2} (2,288/sq mi)
- Time zone: UTC+5:30 (Sri Lanka Standard Time)
- Postal Code: 21300
- Area code: 066

Ukuwela (Sinhala:උකුවෙල, Tamil:உக்குவளை) is a large suburb of Matale, Sri Lanka. lt lies south about 5.5 kilometres (3.4 mi) from the Matale Municipal Council, area, located on the Wattegama-Matale Road.

== Demographics ==
Ukuwela is a multi-religious area. The area has a Buddhist majority with a large Muslim population and significant Hindus and Christians.

Religion in Ukuwela (2012)
Population	Percent
Buddhist	59.74%
Muslim	31.18%
Hindu	10.00%
Christian	2.00%
Others	0.01%

Source:statistics.gov.lk

== Topography ==
Ukuwela is located in the mountainous and thickly forested interior of the island and overlooked by Knuckles Mountain Range. It is situated 383 m (1,257 ft) above sea level.

== Climate ==
Ukuwela's climate is classified as tropical. Ukuwela is an area with a significant rainfall. Even in the driest month there is a lot of rain. The climate here is classified as Af by the Köppen-Geiger system. The average annual rainfall is 1,892 mm (74.5 in). The wet season has a rainfall peak around September, the dry season is around the month of February.

In Ukuwela, the average annual temperature is 25.2 °C (77.4 °F). March is warmest with an average temperature of 31.8 °C (89.2 °F) at noon. February is coldest with an average temperature of 19 °C (66 °F) at night. Ukuwela has no distinct temperature seasons, the temperature is relatively constant during the year. The temperatures at night are cooler than during daytime. March is on average the month with most sunshine. Ukuwela has a humid (> 0.65 p/pet) climate.

== Natural Vegetation ==
The land area is not cultivated, most of the natural vegetation is still intact. The landscape is mostly covered with closed to open broadleaved evergreen or semi-deciduous forest. The climate is classified as a tropical monsoon (short dry season, monsoon rains other months), with a tropical moist forest biozone .

== Soil ==
The soil in the area is high in lixisols (lx), soil with clay-enriched lower horizon, low cec, and high saturation of bases.

== Transport ==
=== Bus ===
Ukuwela has a public transport system based primarily on buses.

=== Rail ===
Ukuwela is served by Sri Lanka Railways' Matale Line and is connected by rail to Matale and Kandy.

== Banks ==
There are four public banks operating in Ukuwela.

- People's Bank
- Bank Of Ceylon
- Sanasa Development Bank
- Rural Bank

== Sports ==
S. B. Yalegama Stadium is the main sporting venue in Ukuwela.

== Education ==
Main Schools

- Ajmeer National School, Ukuwela
- Nagolla Sidhartha M.M.V., Ukuwela
- Kuriwela Hameedia College

== Ukuwela Power station ==
Water from the Polgolla Reservoir is transferred to the Ukuwela Power Station, near Ukuwela, via an 8 km (5.0 mi) long underground penstock. The power station at Ukuwela consists of two 20 MW (27,000 hp) hydroelectric generators, totalling the plant capacity to 40 MW (54,000 hp).

== See also ==
- List of towns in Central Province, Sri Lanka
