= Matale railway station =

Railway station in Sri Lanka

Matale

General information
- Location: Gongawella Road, Matale; Sri Lanka
- Coordinates: 7.468°N 80.6248°E
- Elevation: 351.21 m (1,152.3 ft)
- System: Sri Lankan Railway Station
- Owner: Sri Lanka Railways
- Line: Matale Line
- Tracks: 1

Other information
- Status: Functioning
- Station code: MTL

History
- Opened: 14 October 1880
Location
- Location within Sri Lanka

Matale Railway Station is the terminus railway station on the Matale railway line of Sri Lanka. It is the 65th railway station on the line from Colombo Fort railway station and is located in the Matale District in the Central Province. It is 148.6 kilometres (92.3 mi) from the Colombo Fort Railway Station and 27.64 kilometres (17.17 mi) from the Kandy Railway Station. The station was opened on 14 October 1880 following the construction of a branch line from Kandy to Matale.

== Location ==
Matale station is located approximately 700 metres (770 yd) to the east of the centre of Matale.

== Timetable ==
Trains to Colombo Fort are available at 4:50 am and 7:40 pm daily. Trains to Kandy are available at 6:40 am, 10:15 am, 1:55 pm, 5:05 pm and 6:50 pm.

== Continuity ==
Preceding station	Sri Lanka Railways	Following station
Thawalankoya	Matale Line	Terminus
