= Mirissa railway station =

Railway station in Sri Lanka

Mirissa

General information
- Location: Udupila Rd, Mirissa; Sri Lanka
- Coordinates: 5.9568°N 80.4734°E
- System: Sri Lankan Railway Station
- Owner: Sri Lanka Railways
- Line: Coastal Line (Sri Lanka)
- Tracks: 1

Other information
- Status: Functioning
- Station code: MIS
Location

Mirissa Railway Station is a railway station on the coastal railway line of Sri Lanka. It is situated between Kamburugamuwa and Polwathumodara railway stations. It is 147.5 kilometres (91.7 mi) from the railway line from the Colombo Fort Railway Station and 9.3 kilometres (5.8 mi) from the Matara Railway Station.

== Location ==
Mirissa station is located approximately 2 kilometres (1.2 mi) to the east of Mirissa.

== Timetable ==
Trains to Colombo Fort are available at 6:22 am and 2:22 pm daily. Trains to Galle are available at 5:21 am, 7:22 am, 10:40 am, 3:27 pm and 5:12 pm. Trains to Matara are available at 8:03 am, 10:30 am, 2:26 p.m., 3:11 pm and 9:25 pm.

== Continuity ==
Preceding station	Sri Lanka Railways	Following station
Polwathumodara	Coastal Line	Kamburugamuwa railway station
