= Polwathumodara railway station =

Railway station in Sri Lanka

Polwathumodara

General information
- Location: Sri Lanka
- Coordinates: 5.9643°N 80.4573°E
- System: Sri Lankan Railway Station
- Owner: Sri Lanka Railways
- Line: Coastal Line (Sri Lanka)

Other information
- Status: Functioning
Location

Polwathumodara railway station is a railway station on the coastal railway line of Sri Lanka. It is situated between Mirissa and Weligama railway stations.

== Timetable ==
Trains to Colombo are available at 6.25 a.m. and 2.25 p.m. daily. Trains to Galle are available at 7.25 a.m., 10.35 a.m., 3.33 a.m. and 5.15 p.m. Trains to Matara are available at 6.26 a.m., 7.26 a.m., 10.36 a.m., 2.26 p.m., 3.34 p.m. and 5.15 p.m.
