= Bandarawela railway station =

Railway station in Sri Lanka

Bandarawela
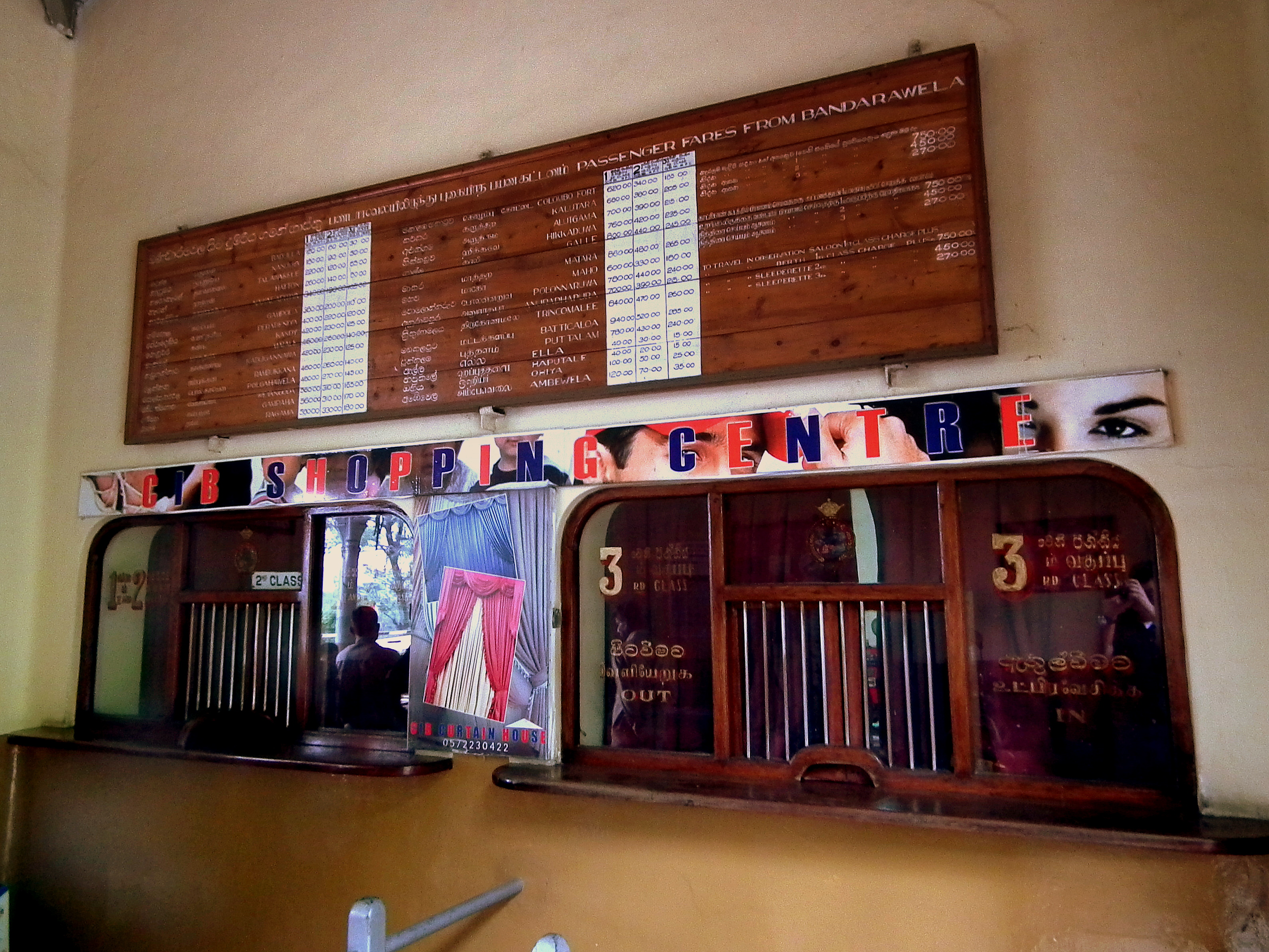
- Bandarawela Railway Station ticket office (June 2011)

General information
- Location: Bandarawela; Sri Lanka
- Coordinates: 6°49′44″N 80°59′15″E
- Operated by: Sri Lanka Railways
- Line(s): Main line
- Distance: 258.72 km (160.8 mi) from Colombo
- Platforms: 1 side platform

Other information
- Station code: BDA

History
- Opened: 1893
Location

Bandarawela railway station is a railway station in Sri Lanka. It is the 71st and eighth last railway station on the Main Line, and is 258.72 km (160.76 mi) away from Colombo. It is located 1,225.5 m (4,021 ft) above mean sea level and 8 km (5.0 mi) from the centre of Badulla, the capital city of Uva Province. All the trains that run on the Main Line, including the Podi Menike and Udarata Menike express trains stop at the station.

The construction of the railway line between Haputale and Bandarawela commenced in 1887 but it wasn't until 1893 that work on the line was completed, with the station cut into the hillside. The first train arriving at the station on 19 June 1893. Bandarawela was the terminus of the Main Line until the line was extended to Badulla in 1924.

The station has a G2 locomotive on permanent display at the station. The diesel shunter locomotive was built by the North British Locomotive Company and operated between 1951 and 1986 at Maligawatta and Thali Mannar. It was moved to Bandarawela on 16 August 2011 and put on display.

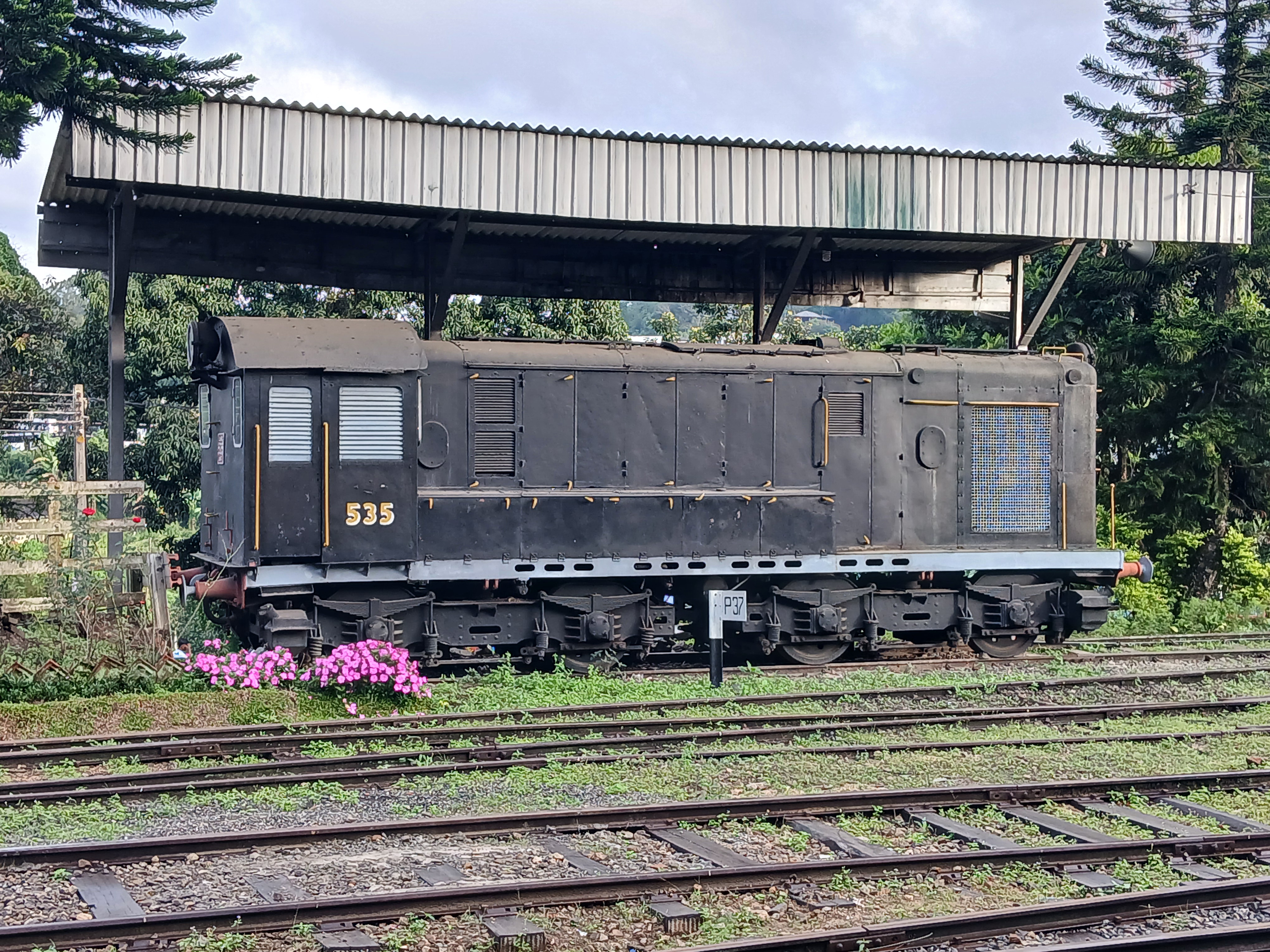
Class G2-535 Locomotive at Bandarawela Railway Station

== Continuity ==
Preceding station	Sri Lanka Railways	Following station
Diyatalawa	Main Line	Kinigama
