= Koggala railway station =

Railway station in Sri Lanka

Koggala කොග්ගල දුම්රිය ස්ථානය
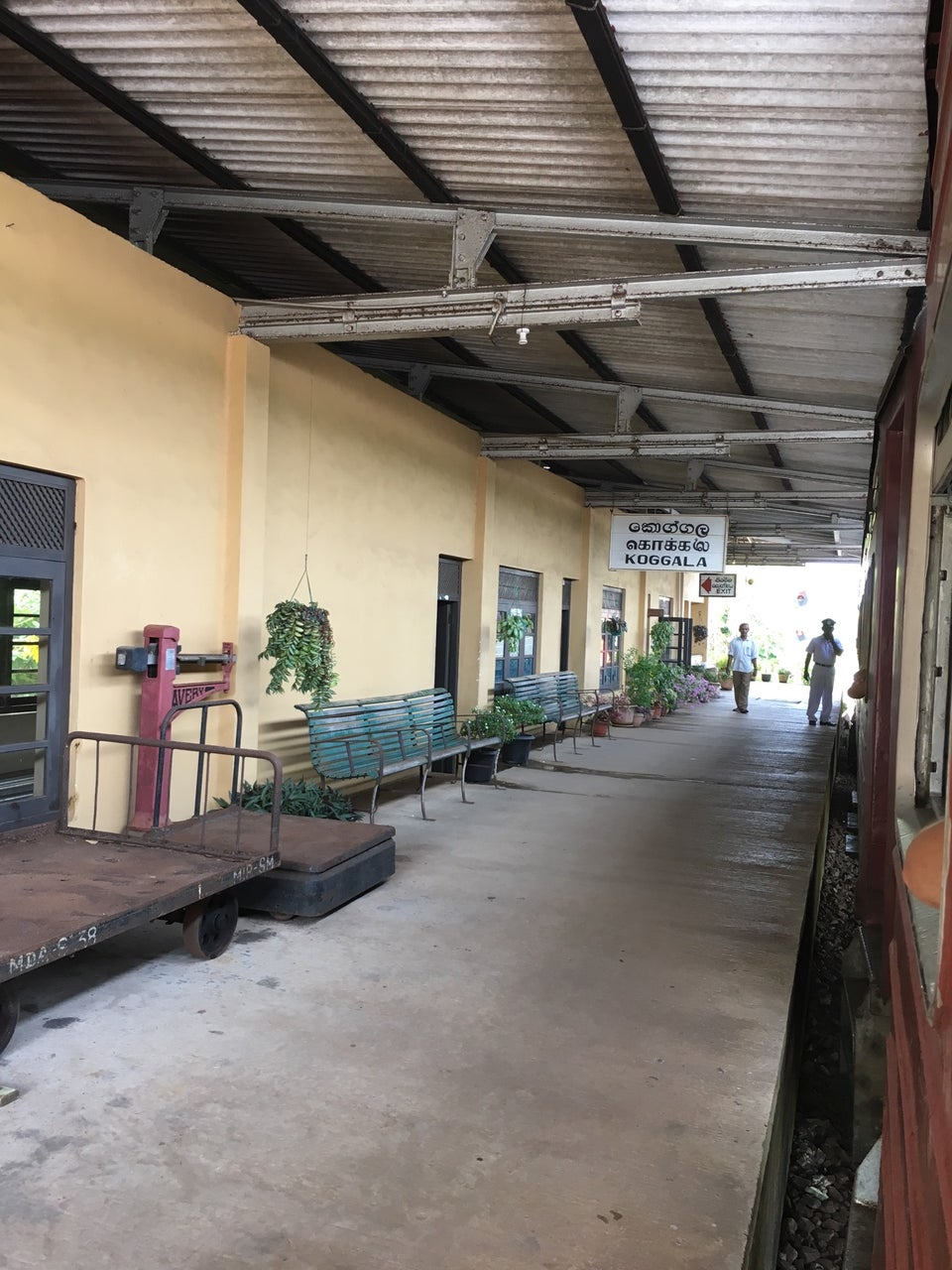

General information
- Location: Koggala; Sri Lanka
- Coordinates: 5.985961°N 80.331658°E
- System: Sri Lankan Railway Station
- Owner: Sri Lanka Railways
- Line: Coastal Line (Sri Lanka)

Other information
- Status: Functioning
- Station code: KOG
Location
- Location within Sri Lanka

Koggola railway station (Sinhala: කොග්ගල දුම්රිය ස්ථානය) is a railway station on the coastal railway line of Sri Lanka.

The station is situated between Kathaluwa and Habaraduwa railway stations and is 129.1 kilometres (80.2 mi) along the railway line from the Colombo Fort Railway Station. The trains run multiple services to Colombo Fort and Matara daily.

== Continuity ==
Preceding station	Sri Lanka Railways	Following station
Kathaluwa railway station	Coastal Line	Habaraduwa railway station
