= Habaraduwa railway station =

Railway station in Sri Lanka

Habaraduwa හබරදුව දුම්රිය ස්ථානය

General information
- Location: Habaraduwa-Dikkumbura Road, Habaraduwa; Sri Lanka
- Coordinates: 5.9984°N 80.3078°E
- System: Sri Lankan Railway Station
- Owner: Sri Lanka Railways
- Line: Coastal Line (Sri Lanka)
- Platforms: one single

Other information
- Status: Functioning
- Station code: HBD

History
- Opened: 2017
Location
- Location within Sri Lanka

Habaraduwa railway station (Sinhala: හබරදුව දුම්රිය ස්ථානය) is a railway station located at Habaraduwa, on the coastal railway line of Sri Lanka.

The station is situated between Koggala and Taple railway stations and is 127.4 kilometres (79.2 mi) along the railway line from the Colombo Fort Railway Station. The trains run multiple services to Colombo Fort and Matara daily.

The railway station was opened on 26 November 2017 by Minister of Transport, Nimal Siripala de Silva.

== Continuity ==
Preceding station	Sri Lanka Railways	Following station
Taple	Coastal Line	Kogalla
