= Aluthgama railway station =

Railway station in Sri Lanka

Aluthgama Railway Station අලුත්ගම දුම්රිය ස්ථානය அளுத்கமை ரயில் நிலையம்
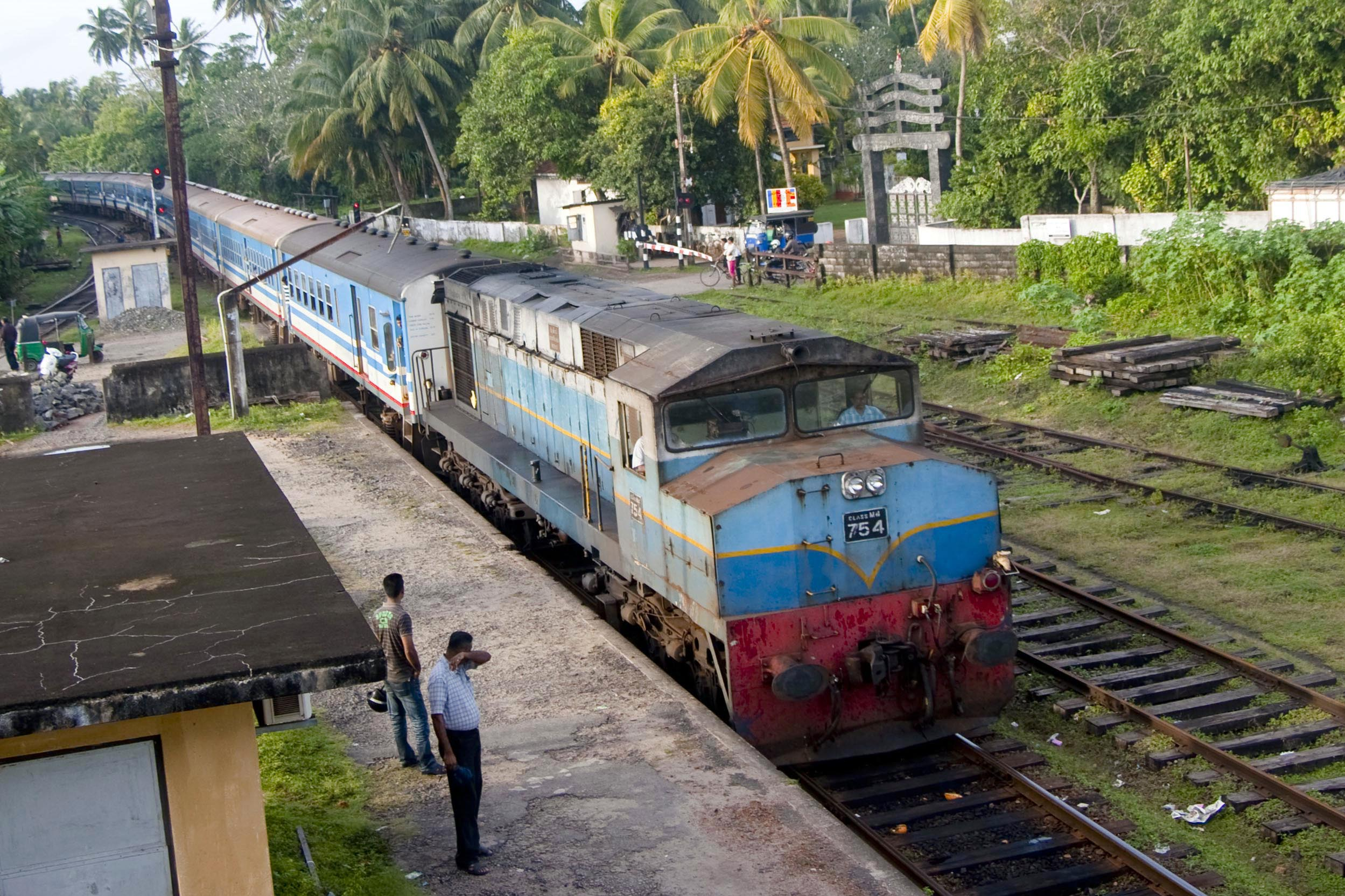
- 'Ruhunu Kumari' Express train at the station in 2010

General information
- Location: Sri Lanka
- Coordinates: 6°25′55.9″N 80°00′1.8″E
- System: Sri Lankan Railway Station
- Owner: Sri Lanka Railways
- Line: Coastal Line (Sri Lanka)
- Platforms: 2
- Tracks: 2

Other information
- Station code: ALT

History
- Opened: 31 March 1890
Location

Aluthgama railway station (Sinhala: අලුත්ගම දුම්රිය ස්ථානය, Tamil: அளுத்கமை ரயில் நிலையம்) is a railway station on the coastal railway line of Sri Lanka. It is situated between Hettimulla and Bentota railway stations. It is 59.7 kilometres (37.1 mi) along the railway line from the Colombo Fort Railway Station at an elevation of 7.92 m (26.0 ft) above sea level.

In 1887, work commenced on extending the Coastal line, which at that time ran from Colombo to Kaluthara. The extension through to Aluthgama was finished in 1888 but the station at Aluthgama was not opened until 31 March 1890.

== Timetable ==
- Trains to Colombo are available at 3:20 am, 3:50 am, 4:30 am, 5:06 am, 5:25 am, 6:10 am, 6:30 am, 6:38 am, 7:05 am, 7:45 am, 8:16 am, 10:42 am, 11:10 am, 12:13 am, 1:40 pm, 3:46 pm, 4:25 pm and 5:32 pm daily.
- Trains to Galle are available at 4:20am, 6:05 am, 10:42 am, 6:32 pm, 7:32 pm and 12:20 pm.
- Trains to Matara are available at 8:28 am, 9:54 am, 11:50 am, 3:43 pm, 4:48 pm, 5:50 pm, and 7:27 pm.

== Continuity ==
Preceding station	Sri Lanka Railways	Following station
Hettimulla railway station	Coastal Line	Bentota railway station
