= Matale line =

Railway line in Sri Lanka

Overview
- Status: Functioning
- Owner: Sri Lanka Railways
- Locale: Sri Lanka
- Termini: Peradeniya Junction; Matale
- Stations: 20 stations
- Website: www.railway.gov.lk

Service
- Type: Regional rail
- System: Sri Lanka Railways
- Operator(s): Sri Lanka Railways

Technical
- Line length: 33.8 km (21.0 mi)
- Number of tracks: Single track: Peradeniya Junction to Matale
- Track gauge: 5 ft 6 in (1,676 mm)
- Electrification: No

Inaugurated in 1880, the Matale line (sometimes referred to as the Kandy line) is a branch railway line in Sri Lanka. Operated by Sri Lanka Railways, the line includes some of the busiest rail services in the country.

== History ==
The 28.2 km (17.5 mi) route was surveyed between 1875 and 1877. In May 1878 the contract to construct the rail line was issued to David Reid for Rs. 1,782,408. The total estimated cost of the Matale extension amounted to Rs. 3,300,000, being a rate of Rs. 189,247 per mile. The line was opened for traffic on 4 October 1880 by the Governor, Sir James Longden, eight months earlier than the contract date, for which Reid was given a Rs. 35,000 bonus.

== Route definition ==
The Matale line begins at Peradeniya Junction and runs east towards Kandy Railway Station. It then turns north and runs through Katugastota and Wattegama before reaching the Matale District. It passes through Ukuwela before terminating at the Matale Railway Station.

== Infrastructure ==
The Matale line has a gauge of 5 ft 6 in (1,676 mm) broad gauge. The line is not electrified. Regular services run on diesel power.

== Timetable ==
=== Downwards ===
Starting station	Departure time	Destination station	Time	Name	Frequency
Kandy	05.00	Matale	06.13		Daily
Kandy	07.04	Matale	08.38		Daily
Kandy	10.20	Matale	11.40		Daily
Kandy	14.00	Matale	15.23		Daily
Kandy	17.10	Matale	18.23		Daily
Kandy	18.40	Matale	20.03		Daily

=== Upwards ===
Starting station	Departure time	Destination station	Time	Name	Frequency
Matale	05.00	Kandy	06.20		Daily
Matale	06.40	Kandy	07.55		Daily
Matale	10.15	Kandy	11.45		Daily
Matale	13.55	Kandy	15.25		Daily
Matale	17.00	Kandy	18.28		Daily
Matale	18.40	Kandy	20.00		Daily
