= Kandy railway station =

Railway station in Kandy, Sri Lanka

Kandy Railway Station මහනුවර දුම්රිය ස්ථානය கண்டி ரயில் நிலையம்
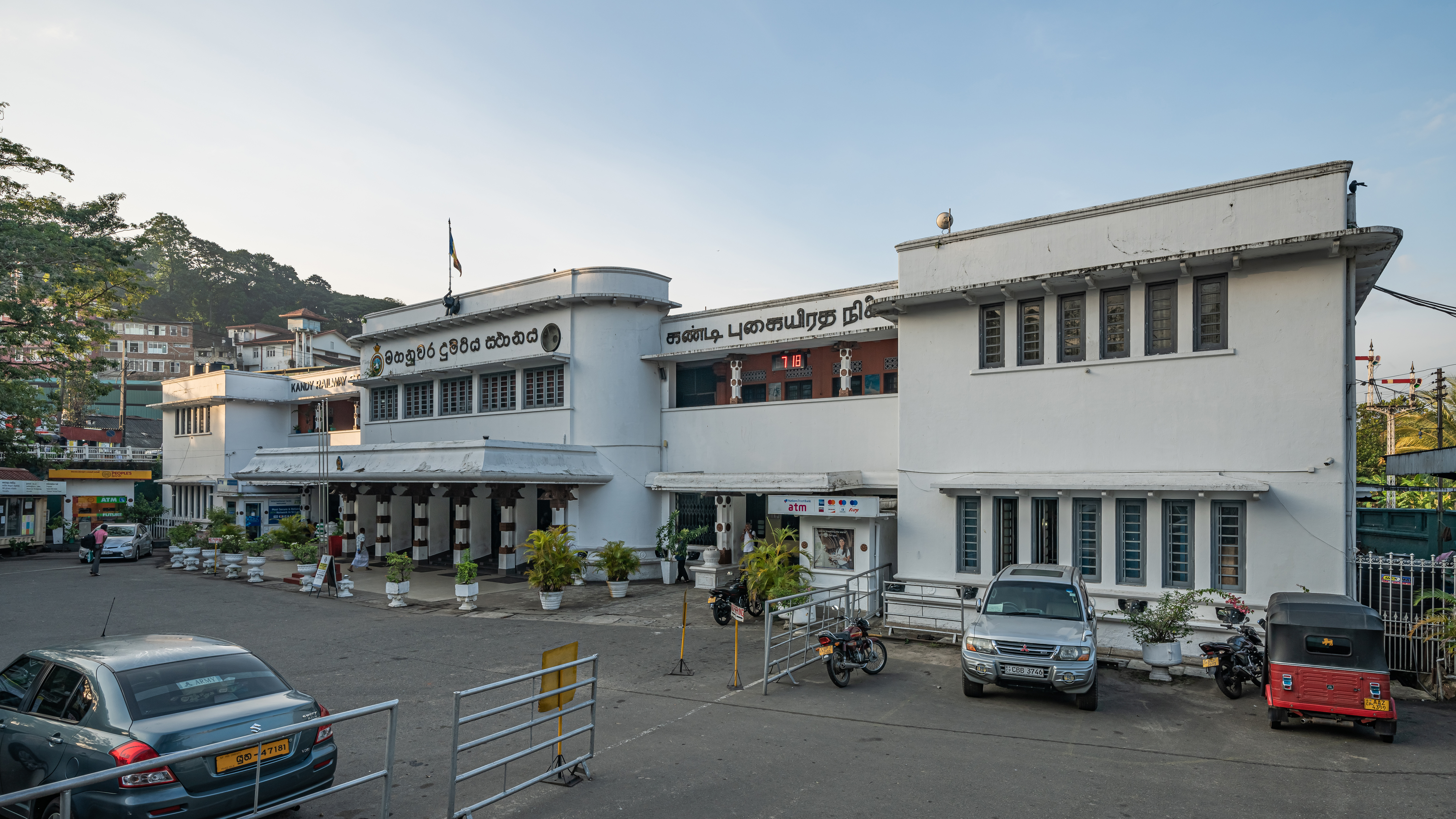
- Kandy train station

General information
- Location: Sri Lanka
- Coordinates: 7.2888°N 80.63151°E
- Owner: Sri Lanka Railways
- Operator: Sri Lanka Railways
- Lines: Main Line; Matale Line
- Distance: 120.737 km (75.022 mi) (from Fort)
- Platforms: 5
- Tracks: 5

Other information
- Website: www.railway.gov.lk/Station Details

History
- Electrified: No

Services
Senkadagala Menike -to Colombo Fort
Tikiri Menike -to Hatton and Colombo Fort
Location
- Location within Sri Lanka

Kandy railway station (Sinhala: මහනුවර දුම්රිය ස්ථානය, Tamil: கண்டி ரயில் நிலையம்) is a major railway station in Kandy, Sri Lanka. The station is served by Sri Lanka Railways and is the primary railway station in Kandy and one of the most significant in the central hills. The station sits on a branch of the Main Line, leading to the Matale Line.

== History ==
The Colombo to Kandy railway line (what is now known as the Main line) was extended in stages, with the first stage to Ambepussa completed in December 1864 and the next stage to Polgahawela by November 1866. Following the construction of bridges over the Mahaweli Ganga and the Maha Oya the last rail tracks were laid on 15 April 1867. The next day, the first steam engine entered the Kandy Railway Station. On 30 April 1867, the first train, a goods service, completed the journey from Colombo to Kandy, with the first passenger service commencing on 1 August 1867. Initially, there were two train passenger/mail services, leaving at the respective ends of the service at 7:00am, with the overall journey taking 4.5 hours.

The railway station at Kandy was constructed on a site known as Deiyange Wela. It is 512 m (1,680 ft) above sea level and 120 km (75 mi) from Colombo.

== Architecture ==
Kandy Railway Station features both Modernist and Victorian architecture. The station building is of the Art Moderne style, incorporating curving forms and long horizontal lines. It uses concrete massing to create a geometric form. Its minimalist walls and simple, bold forms contrast sharply with the highly ornamented, traditional architecture that surrounds it.

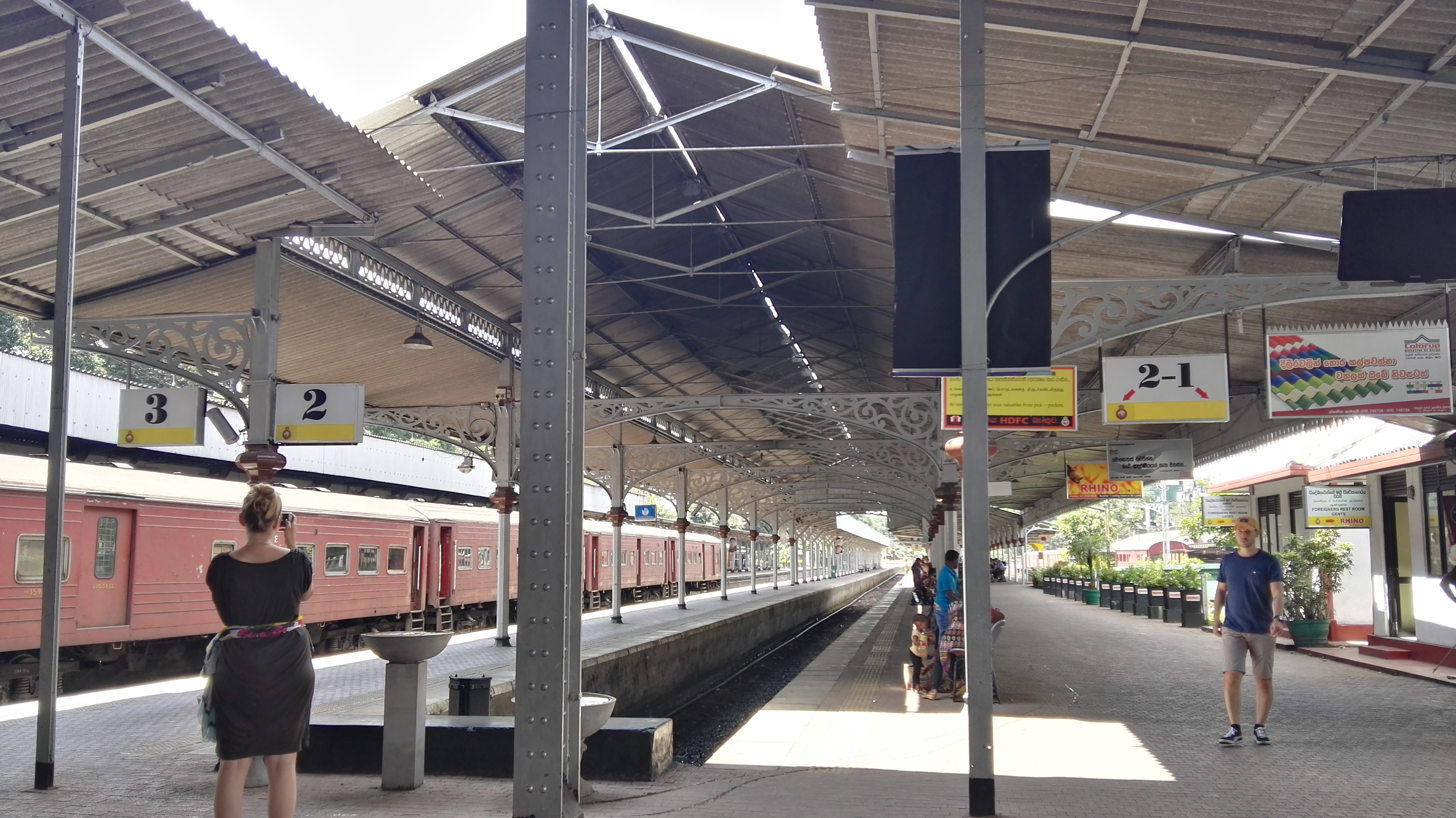
Platform at Kandy station

The structure sheltering the platforms is of an older Victorian design. The structure displays stylish arches and intricate metalwork.

== Refurbishment ==
In February 2008 Chevron Sri Lanka provided RS. 7 million to Sri Lanka Railways to renovate and restore the railway station. The refurbishment was completed by June 2008, prior to the commencement of the South Asian Association for Regional Cooperation summit. The works included drainage, landscaping, colour washing of the station building, renovation of lobby flooring, installation of new platform benches, waste collection facilities, and the renovation of toilets and passenger waiting rooms.

== See also ==
- List of railway stations in Sri Lanka
- List of railway stations by line order in Sri Lanka
