= Locomotives of Sri Lanka Railways =

List of Railway Locomotives used in Sri Lanka

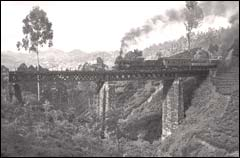
Early steam powered train on the hill-country railway line

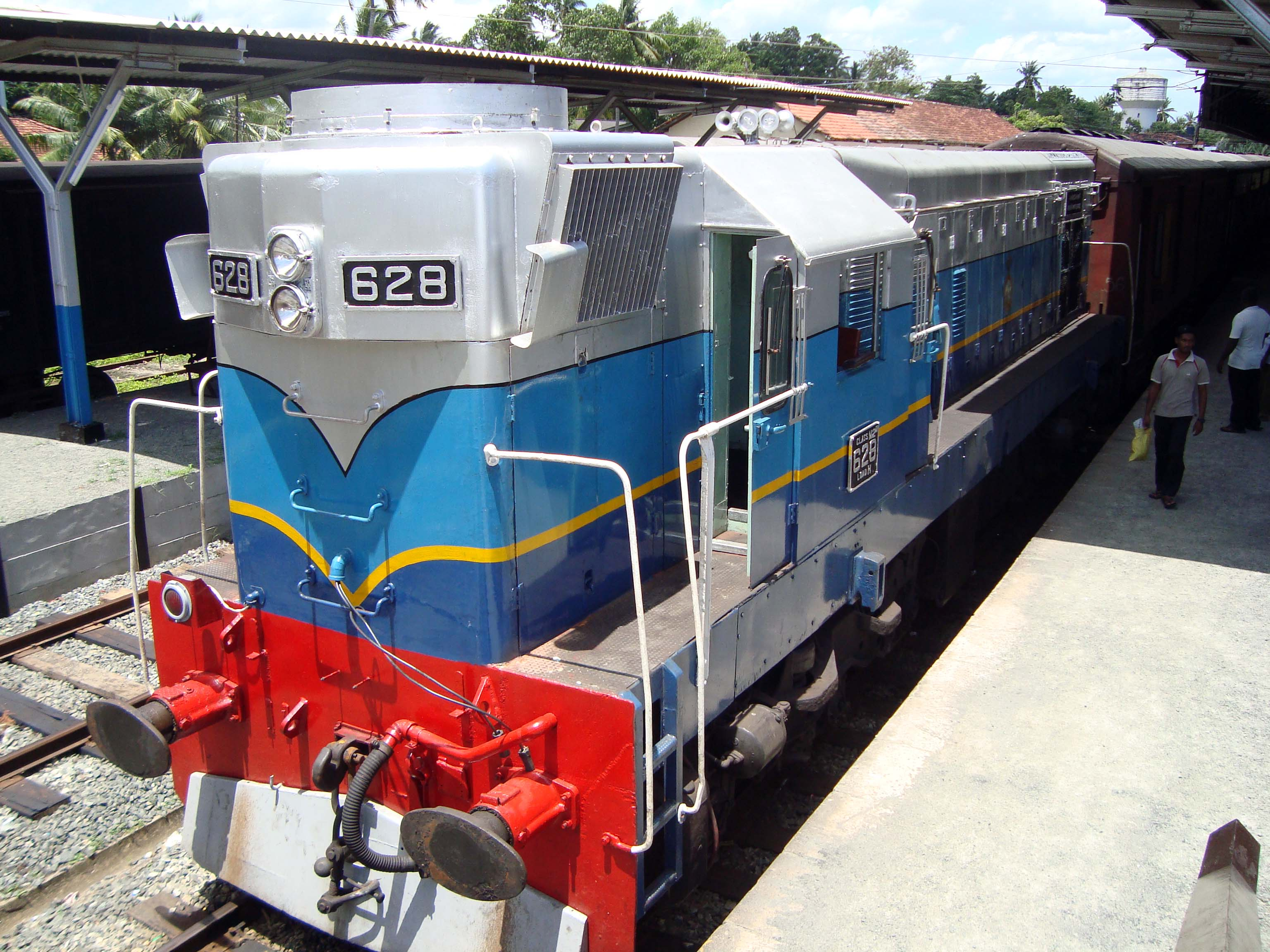
Class M2D, No. 628 "Kankesanthurai" locomotive at Matara Railway Station.

Locomotives and train sets of Sri Lanka Railways consist mostly of diesel locomotives and multiple units. Steam locomotives are no longer used, except on heritage trains such as the Viceroy Special.

The first locomotives pulled trains on the original segment of the Main Line, on 54 kilometres (34 miles) connecting Colombo and Ambepussa. In 1953, Sri Lanka Railways enhanced its service to more power with diesel locomotives. Since then, various types of diesel locomotives were added to the service.

== History ==
Sri Lanka's first railway locomotive was Leopold, introduced in 1864. It was one of seven 4-4-0 locomotives built that year for the Ceylon Government Railway by Robert Stephenson & Company (Nos. 1–5) and Beyer, Peacock & Company (Nos. 6 and 7). Many more steam locomotives were added to the system, through to the 1950s. All the steam locomotives but three were manufactured in the United Kingdom; the exceptions were three 4-4-0s built at the railway's Maradana Works near Colombo in 1900 and 1905. In 1938, locomotives were reclassified, based on wheel arrangement and gauge. Sub-classification was based on weight, modifications, heating type, boiler capacity, or other features.

Throughout its history, Ceylon Government Railway had 410 steam locomotives.

The Railways upgraded its service to diesel locomotives, under the leadership of B. D. Rampala in the mid-1950s. In 1953, the first locomotives from British builder Brush Bagnall were imported. Since then, the Railways have imported locomotives from Canada, Japan, West Germany, India, France, and China.

In the 1990s, Sri Lanka Railways converted the 2 ft 6 in (762 mm) narrow gauge Kelani Valley line into 5 ft 6 in (1,676 mm) broad gauge. This was the last narrow gauge line left in Sri Lanka, and its conversion to broad gauge put the fleet of narrow gauge locomotives out of use. All operational locomotives in the country today are broad gauge.

As of March 2022, Sri Lanka does not have commercially operational electric locomotives or train sets. Electrification has been proposed to improve energy efficiency and sustainability.

== Liveries ==
Sri Lanka's locomotives have appeared in several different liveries over the years.

The steam locomotives were mainly painted in black.

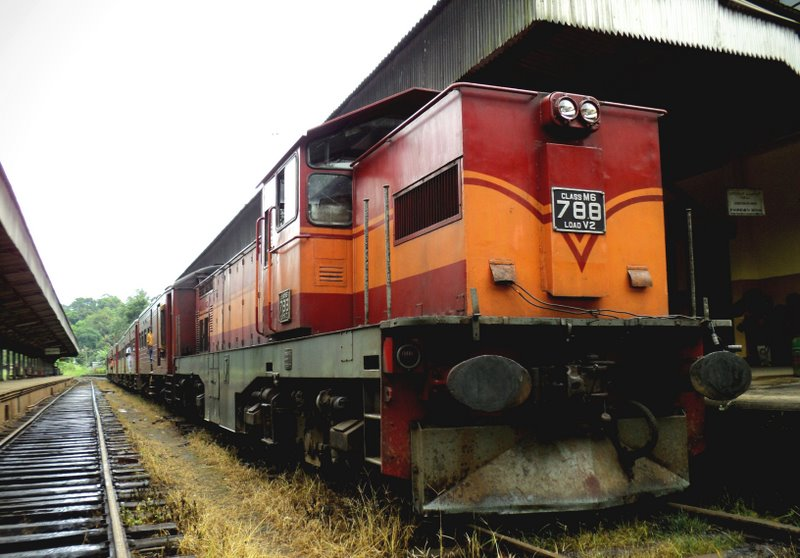
Class M6 No. 788 painted in the M6's unique ICE (Intercity Express) livery

With the introduction of diesel locomotives, coloured liveries appeared. Typical for many locomotives is a livery that has thick horizontal bands of dark blue, light blue, silver and a yellow stripe. Also common for many locomotives is a livery of horizontal bands of green, brown, and a yellow stripe.

The Diesel Multiple Units (DMUs) are painted in various liveries, unique to their classes. Typically, they feature horizontal bands of colour running their entire length and a solid colour on the front and back ends.

=== ICE livery ===
M6 ICE locomotives have a unique ICE livery of brown and orange.

== Numbering ==
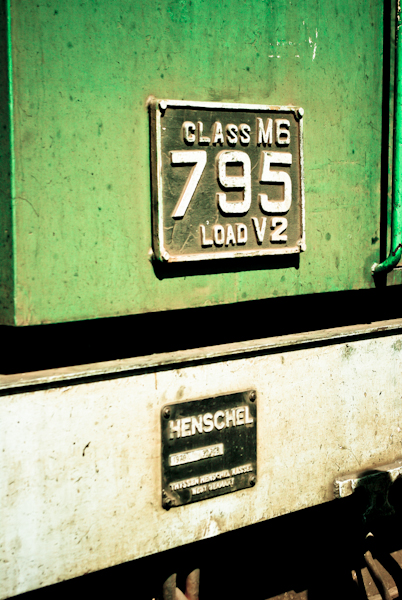
Number plate on Class M6 No. 795

Steam locomotives were numbered from 1 upwards, reaching 161 in 1911. Whereafter replacement locomotives were given the same number as the locomotive that they replaced with an "R" prefix; until such time as the old locomotive, now running with an "O" prefix, was finally withdrawn. This system was abandoned in 1928, with new locomotives being numbered from 249 upwards, and reaching 336 by 1940, and 362 in 1951 when the last steam locomotive — a 4-8-0 from WG Bagnall — was delivered.

Narrow gauge locomotives were numbered in the same list as broad-gauge locomotives. Diesel locomotives and multiple unit numbering started from 500 – an Armstrong Whitworth 122 hp 0-4-0 diesel-electric shunter delivered in 1934 – and reached 840 in 1991. It included one locomotive experimentally converted to electric traction.

== Steam locomotives ==
Steam locomotives were used on regular services until the 1970s.

Class	Photo	Numbers	Type	Quantity	Manufacturer	Year	Gauge	Preserved?	Notes
—N/a		1–15, 24–25, 28–29, 39–40, 43–47	4-4-0	26	Robert Stephenson & Company (5); Beyer, Peacock & Company (7); Kitson & Company (14)	1864–1880	Broad Gauge (5ft 6in)	No	5-foot driving wheels
—N/a		20–23, 26–27	4-4-0	6	Beyer, Peacock & Company (4); Kitson & Company (2)	1868–1872	Broad Gauge (5ft 6in)	No	6-foot driving wheels; 16″×22″ cylinders
—N/a		63–71, 89–92	4-4-0	13	Dübs & Company	1892–1895	Broad Gauge (5ft 6in)	No	6-foot driving wheels; 17″×24″ cylinders
—N/a		16–19, 41–42	0-6-0	6	John Fowler & Co	1868–1878	Broad Gauge (5ft 6in)	No	
—N/a		30–31	0-4-0ST	2	Robert Stephenson & Company	1868	Broad Gauge (5ft 6in)	No	Ex Breakwater branch; absorbed in 1874; a third loco was not taken into stock
—N/a		32–38, 48	4-4-0T	8	Robert Stephenson & Company (3); Kitson & Company (5)	1876–1880	Broad Gauge (5ft 6in)	No	
—N/a		30–31, 1 (second)	4-4-0	3	CGR Maradana Works	1900–1905	Broad Gauge (5ft 6in)	No	5-foot driving wheels; 16″×24″ cylinders
—N/a		163	0-6-0CT	1	RW Hawthorn, Leslie & Company	1913	Broad Gauge (5ft 6in)	No	Crane tank
A1		18–19, 41–42	4-8-0	4	Kitson & Company	1913–1921	Broad Gauge (5ft 6in)	No	
A2		155–156	4-8-0	2	Kitson & Company	1911	Broad Gauge (5ft 6in)	No	Renumbered 16–17
A3		275–278, 296–297, 334–336, 357–362	4-8-0	15	Hunslet Engine Company (6); WG Bagnall (9)	1928–1951	Broad Gauge (5ft 6in)	No	
B1		4, 30, 242–262, 279–290; 294–295; 347–342; 351–356	4-6-0	49	Beyer, Peacock & Company (25); Armstrong Whitworth (12); Robert Stephenson & Company (12)	1927–47	Broad Gauge (5ft 6in)	Yes	“Governor” class – many named.; No. 30 Sir Thomas Maitland, runs the Viceroy Special service.
B2		1, 3, 25–29, 39–40, 43–47; 193–196, 204–213, 222–228	4-6-0	35	Kitson & Company (3); Robert Stephenson & Company (11); Vulcan Foundry (21)	1925–1925	Broad Gauge (5ft 6in)	Yes	No. 213 preserved and operational
B3		8–11, 22, 169–171, 185–192	4-6-0	16	Kitson & Company	1913–1914	Broad Gauge (5ft 6in)	No	
B4		72–75, 147–147, 158–159	4-6-0	9	Neilson & Company (4); Kitson & Company (5)	1893–1912	Broad Gauge (5ft 6in)	No	
B5		76–80	4-6-0	5	Neilson & Company (3); Vulcan Foundry (2)	1894	Broad Gauge (5ft 6in)	No	
B6		49–62	4-6-0	14	Kitson & Company (10); Vulcan Foundry (4)	1882–1890	Broad Gauge (5ft 6in)	No	
B7		81–88	4-6-0	8	RW Hawthorn, Leslie & Company	1894	Broad Gauge (5ft 6in)	No	
B8		214–219, 229–240	4-6-0	18	Hunslet Engine Company (13); RW Hawthorn, Leslie & Company (2); Nasmyth, Wilson & Company (3)	1922–27	Broad Gauge (5ft 6in)	No	
B9		140–141	4-6-0	2	Hunslet Engine Company	1908	Broad Gauge (5ft 6in)	Yes	Renumbered 134–135.; One preserved as a static display at Colombo Fort railway station.
B10		109–119	4-6-0	11	Dübs & Company	1901	Broad Gauge (5ft 6in)	No	
C1		241, 343–350	2-6-2+2-6-2	9	Beyer, Peacock & Company	1927, 1945	Broad Gauge (5ft 6in)	Yes	1945 locos later converted to oil firing; Had a sub-class "C1a"
D1		270–274	2-6-4T	5	Robert Stephenson & Company	1928	Broad Gauge (5ft 6in)	No	“College” class – most named; All scrapped
D2			2-6-4T				Broad Gauge (5ft 6in)	No	All scrapped
D3		12–15, 20–21, 131–139, 150–151, 164–168	2-6-4T	22	Robert Stephenson & Company (20); RW Hawthorn, Leslie & Company (2)	1907–1914	Broad Gauge (5ft 6in)	No	131–139 renumbered 32–37, 131–133; 150–151 renumbered 38, 40; 12 rebuilt as class D1 and numbered 298 in 1930; D3 class saturated, reclassified D2 when superheated; All scrapped.
E1		23–24, 93–94, 101; 162, 179–183, 197–200	0-6-0T	15	Dübs & Company (3); North British Locomotive Company (5); Hunslet Engine Company (7)	1898–1915	Broad Gauge (5ft 6in)	Yes	Most rebuilt as 0-6-2T.; No. 93 built in 1898 is the oldest surviving steam locomotive in the country – now preserved at the National Railway Museum, Kadugannawa.
F1		265–269	0-6-2T	5	Robert Stephenson & Company	1928	Broad Gauge (5ft 6in)	No	All scrapped
F2		2, 5–7, 144–157, 172–173	4-4-0	20	Vulcan Foundry (5); North British Locomotive Company (15)	1911–1913	Broad Gauge (5ft 6in)	No	144–151 delivered as 152–154, 157–161; F2 saturated, reclassified F2 when superheated.; All scrapped.
F3		95–100, 124–129	4-4-0	12	Dübs & Company (6); Kitson & Company (2); North British Locomotive Company (4)	1900–1903	Broad Gauge (5ft 6in)	No	All scrapped
H1		293	2-4-0+0-4-2	1	Beyer, Peacock & Company	1930	Narrow Gauge (2ft 6in)	No	All scrapped
J1		220–221, 263–264, 291–292	4-6-4T	6	Hunslet Engine Company	1924–1929	Narrow Gauge (2ft 6in)		
J2		142–146, 160–161, 174–178, 184, 201–202	4-6-4T	15	Hunslet Engine Company (11); North British Locomotive Company (4)	1908–1919	Narrow Gauge (2ft 6in)		142–146 renumbered to 136–140.
K1		102–108	4-4-0T	7	Hunslet Engine Company	1900–1901	Narrow Gauge (2ft 6in)		Known as the Kelani Valley Tanks.; Two were used for the film "Bridge on the River Kwai"
L1		120–123, 130, 203	0-4-2T	6	Sharp, Stewart & Company (4); Hunslet Engine Company (2)	1902–1904, 1920	Narrow Gauge (2ft 6in)	Yes	Known as the Uda Pussellawe tanks.
R1		301–313	Steam railcar	13	Sentinel	1925–1927	Broad Gauge (5ft 6in)	No	Some were later fitted with small under-floor diesel units and were reclassified as T2.
R2		317–320	Steam railcar	4	Sentinel	1928	Broad Gauge (5ft 6in)	No	Some were later fitted with small under-floor diesel units and were reclassified as T2.
R3		321–327	Steam railcar	7	Sentinel	1928	Broad Gauge (5ft 6in)	No	Some were later fitted with small under-floor diesel units and were reclassified as T2.
R4		314–316	Steam railcar	3	Clayton	1928	Broad Gauge (5ft 6in)	No	Some were later fitted with small under-floor diesel units and were reclassified as T2.
V1		328–330	Steam railcar	3	Sentinel	1927	Narrow Gauge (2ft 6in)	No	
V2		331–333	Steam railcar	3	Sentinel	1928	Narrow Gauge (2ft 6in)	No	

== Diesel locomotives ==
Class	Type
M	Diesel Electric Locomotives
W	Diesel Hydraulic Locomotives
G & Y	Shunters
N & P	Narrow Gauge Locomotives
S	Diesel Multiple Units
T	Diesel Rail Cars

=== Class M — Diesel Electric Locomotives ===
Diesel locomotives of Sri Lanka Railway are categorized into several classes and their sub classes.

Class	Photo	Sub Class	Numbers	Type	Quantity	Manufacturer	Year	Model	Power	Operational?	Notes
M1			539–563	A1A-A1A	25	Brush Traction	1952		1000 hp	No	One is preserved at the National Railway Museum, Kadugannawa.
M2		M2	569–573	A1A-A1A	5	General Motors Diesel	1954–1966	G12	1400 hp	Yes	Except one (No. 571 Saskatchewan) all others are in operation.; Locomotive No. 591 Manitoba was involved in the 2004 Boxing Day Tsunami train wreck, the largest single rail disaster in world history by death toll.
M2		M2A	591–593	A1A-A1A	3	General Motors Diesel	1954–1966	G12	1400 hp	Yes	Except one (No. 571 Saskatchewan) all others are in operation.; Locomotive No. 591 Manitoba was involved in the 2004 Boxing Day Tsunami train wreck, the largest single rail disaster in world history by death toll.
M2		M2B	594,595	A1A-A1A	2	General Motors Diesel	1954–1966	G12	1400 hp	Yes	Except one (No. 571 Saskatchewan) all others are in operation.; Locomotive No. 591 Manitoba was involved in the 2004 Boxing Day Tsunami train wreck, the largest single rail disaster in world history by death toll.
M2		M2C	626,627	Bo-Bo	2	General Motors Diesel	1954–1966	G12	1400 hp	Yes	Except one (No. 571 Saskatchewan) all others are in operation.; Locomotive No. 591 Manitoba was involved in the 2004 Boxing Day Tsunami train wreck, the largest single rail disaster in world history by death toll.
M2		M2D	628,629	A1A-A1A	2	Electro-Motive Division	1954–1966	G12	1400 hp	Yes	Except one (No. 571 Saskatchewan) all others are in operation.; Locomotive No. 591 Manitoba was involved in the 2004 Boxing Day Tsunami train wreck, the largest single rail disaster in world history by death toll.
M3			589–590	Bo-Bo	2	Sri Lankan Railways	1956–1958		360 hp	No	Engines (180 hp × 2) taken from S1 class.
M4			743–756	Co-Co	14	Montreal Locomotive Works	1975	MX-620	1750 hp	Yes	
M5		M5	767–782	Bo-Bo	16	Hitachi	1979		1640 hp	Yes	Some of the original M5 locomotives were rebuilt into new subclasses owing to mechanical issues: M5A: Re-engined locally using MTU V12 in 1991; has been condemned.; M5B: Re-engined locally using Paxman V12 in 1997.; M5C: Re-engined locally using Caterpillar 3516 DITA.
M5		M5A	769	Bo-Bo	1	Sri Lanka Railways			1150 hp	Yes	Some of the original M5 locomotives were rebuilt into new subclasses owing to mechanical issues: M5A: Re-engined locally using MTU V12 in 1991; has been condemned.; M5B: Re-engined locally using Paxman V12 in 1997.; M5C: Re-engined locally using Caterpillar 3516 DITA.
M5		M5B	768, 772, 777, 778	Bo-Bo	4	Sri Lanka Railways			1150 hp	Yes	Some of the original M5 locomotives were rebuilt into new subclasses owing to mechanical issues: M5A: Re-engined locally using MTU V12 in 1991; has been condemned.; M5B: Re-engined locally using Paxman V12 in 1997.; M5C: Re-engined locally using Caterpillar 3516 DITA.
M5		M5C	767, 771, 776, 779, 781, 782, 775	Bo-Bo	7	Sri Lanka Railways			1600 hp	Yes	Some of the original M5 locomotives were rebuilt into new subclasses owing to mechanical issues: M5A: Re-engined locally using MTU V12 in 1991; has been condemned.; M5B: Re-engined locally using Paxman V12 in 1997.; M5C: Re-engined locally using Caterpillar 3516 DITA.
M6			783–798	A1A-A1A	16	Thyssen-Henschel	1979–1980	G22	1650 hp	Yes	
M7			799–814	Bo-Bo	16	Brush Traction	1981		1000 hp	Yes	
M8		M8	841-848	Co-Co	8	Banaras Locomotive Works	1995	WDM-2	2600 hp	Yes	
M8		M8A	877, 878	Co-Co	2	Banaras Locomotive Works	2001	WDM-2	2200 hp	Yes	
M9			864–873	Co-Co	10	Alstom	2000	AD32C	1800 hp	Yes	Several units out of service shortly after introduction due to cost of spares and repair.
M10		M10	915-917	Co-Co	3	Banaras Locomotive Works	2012	WDM-3D (With Alco 251 series 12 diesel engine)	2300 hp	Yes	Sub class M10A was introduced in 2013 which is a technical variant.
M10		M10A	940-945	Co-Co	6	Banaras Locomotive Works	2012	WDM-3D (With Alco 251 series 12 diesel engine)	2300 hp	Yes	Sub class M10A was introduced in 2013 which is a technical variant.
M11			949-958	Co-Co	10	Banaras Locomotive Works	2018	WDG-4D (With EMD 12-710 diesel engine)	3200 hp	Yes	

=== Class W — Diesel Hydraulic Locomotives ===
Class	Photo	Sub class	Numbers	Type	Quantity	Manufacturer	Year	Power	Operational?	Notes
W1			630–674	B-B	45	Rheinstahl Henschel	1968–1969	1150 hp	Yes	10 rebuilt with Caterpillar engines and reclassified W3.; Only 2 locomotives are in operation.
W2		W2	703–716, 729	B-B	15	LEW	1968–1972	1440 hp	Yes	729 ex demonstrator, ran as DR V150.001; imported 1970.; Several re-furbished and in operation.
W2		W2A	715	B-B	1	Sri Lanka Railways	2015	1440 hp	Yes	Rebuilt with a Paxman Valenta V12 engine.
W3			631, 636, 638, 647, 659, 665, 666, 667, 669, 673	B-B	10	Sri Lanka Railways	1997–Present	1150 hp	Yes	10 rebuilt from class W1 with Caterpillar engines.; Mainly used in up country line.

=== Classes G and Y — Shunters (also known as Switchers) ===
Class	Photo	Numbers	Type	Quantity	Manufacturer	Year	Power	Livery	Notes
G1		500	0–4–0 DE	1	Armstrong Whitworth	1934 - 2006	122 hp	No	Sulzer engine.; One is preserved at the National Railway Museum, Kadugannawa.
G2		531–538	Bo-Bo DE	8	North British Locomotive Company	1950- 2000	625 hp	No	Paxman V8 engine.
Y		675–702	0-6-0 DH	28	Hunslet Engine Company	1968- 1973	530 hp	Yes	Still in operation.
Y1		721–728	D DH	8	Sri Lanka Railways	1972–1973		No	Paxman V12 engine.

=== Classes N and P — Narrow Gauge Locomotives ===
Class	Photo	Numbers	Type	Quantity	Manufacturer	Year	Power	Operational?	Notes
N1		564–568	1-C-1	5	Krupp	1952–53	500 hp	No	
N2		730–732	B-B	3	Kawasaki	1973	600 hp	No	GM Detroit Diesel V16 engine. Ordered by Sri Lanka Veneers & Plywood.; One is preserved at the National Railway Museum, Kadugannawa.
P1		527–530	0-6-0	4	Hunslet Engine Company	1950	120 hp	No	One is preserved at the National Railway Museum, Kadugannawa.

Note: One class N2 locomotive was re-classified as Class E1 after fitting with Alstom pantographs, to be run under electric power. Not to be confused with the steam locomotive E1, this electric locomotive is not in commercial use. One class P1 locomotive was at Viharamahadevi (Victoria) Amusement Park.

=== Class S - Diesel Push Pull Trains ===
S1–S8 Diesel Hydraulic Multiple Units, S9–S14, S14A Diesel Electric & Electro-Diesel Multiple Units

Class	Sub-class	Photo	Numbers	Type	Quantity	Manufacturer	Year	Power	Operational?	Notes
S1			501–503	4-car	3	English Electric	1938	400 hp	No	Named Silver Foam, Silver Spray, and Silver Mist.
S2			574–588		15	Schindler Carriage and Wagon Works	1958	500 hp	No	
S3			596–620		25	MAN	1959	880 hp	No	One power car is preserved at the National Railway Museum, Kadugannawa.
S4			621–624		5	MAN	1961	1000 hp	No	
S5			717–720	5-car	2 sets	Hitachi	1970	880 hp	No	Hitachi tourist excursion train.
S6			733–742		10	Hitachi	1974	1150 hp	No	Very similar in appearance to S7. Operated mainly on the broad gauged Kelani Valley line.
S7			757–766		10	Hitachi	1977	1000 hp	No	Very similar in appearance to S6. Operated mainly on the broad gauged Kelani Valley line.; Two power cars are preserved at the National Railway Museum, Kadugannawa.
S8			821–840		20	Hyundai	1991	1150 hp	Yes	
S9			849–863		20	CSR	2000	1150 hp	Yes	
S10			879-893		15	CSR	2008		Yes	
S11			894–913		20	ICF	2011–2012	1360 hp	Yes	Designed with multi-class accommodation.
S12			917–939		22	CSR	2012	2000 hp	Yes	Power cars are single-ended locomotives without passenger interiors.; Imported in two variants, one for run on commuter services and other run on long distance services.
S13	S13	S13 959 Powerset	959–970		6 (double sets)	ICF	2017-2019	1800 hp	Yes	Power cars are single-ended locomotives without passenger interiors.
S13	S13A	S13A 994 Powerset	993–996		2 (double sets)	ICF	2019-2021	1800 hp	Yes	Power car is a single-ended locomotive without passenger interiors.; All trailer coaches are Air-conditioned Chair cars.
S14	S14	S14	971–988		9 sets (2 power cars per set)	CRRC Qingdao Sifang	2019-2020	1950 hp	Yes	Power cars are single-ended locomotives without passenger interiors.
S14	S14A		989–992		4 (power cars)	CRRC Qingdao Sifang	2019-2020	1950 hp	Yes	

=== Class T - Diesel Rail Cars & Other ===
The various Railbus units that are currently operated are not listed below.

Class	Photo	Numbers	Type	Quantity	Manufacturer	Year	Model	Power	Operational?	Notes
T1		504–526	Railcar	23	English Electric	1947		200 hp	No	Coupled in Twin Units.
T2			Railcar			1950			No	Converted from steam rail car in 1950.
Mini Loco 1			Diesel locomotive	1	SLR Rathmalana Works	1997		150 hp	No	
Locally built rail buses		RB1-RB14	Rail Bus	14	SLR Rathmalana Works	1995-2002	Based on: Tata 1210/48; Ashok Leyland Viking 193 Bus Chassis	TATA :- NA 692 DI 97 hp; Ashok Leyland :- 0.400 - 110 hp WO6E1- 119hp HAL6ETI - 113 hp	Yes	
