= Sri Lanka Railways W1 =

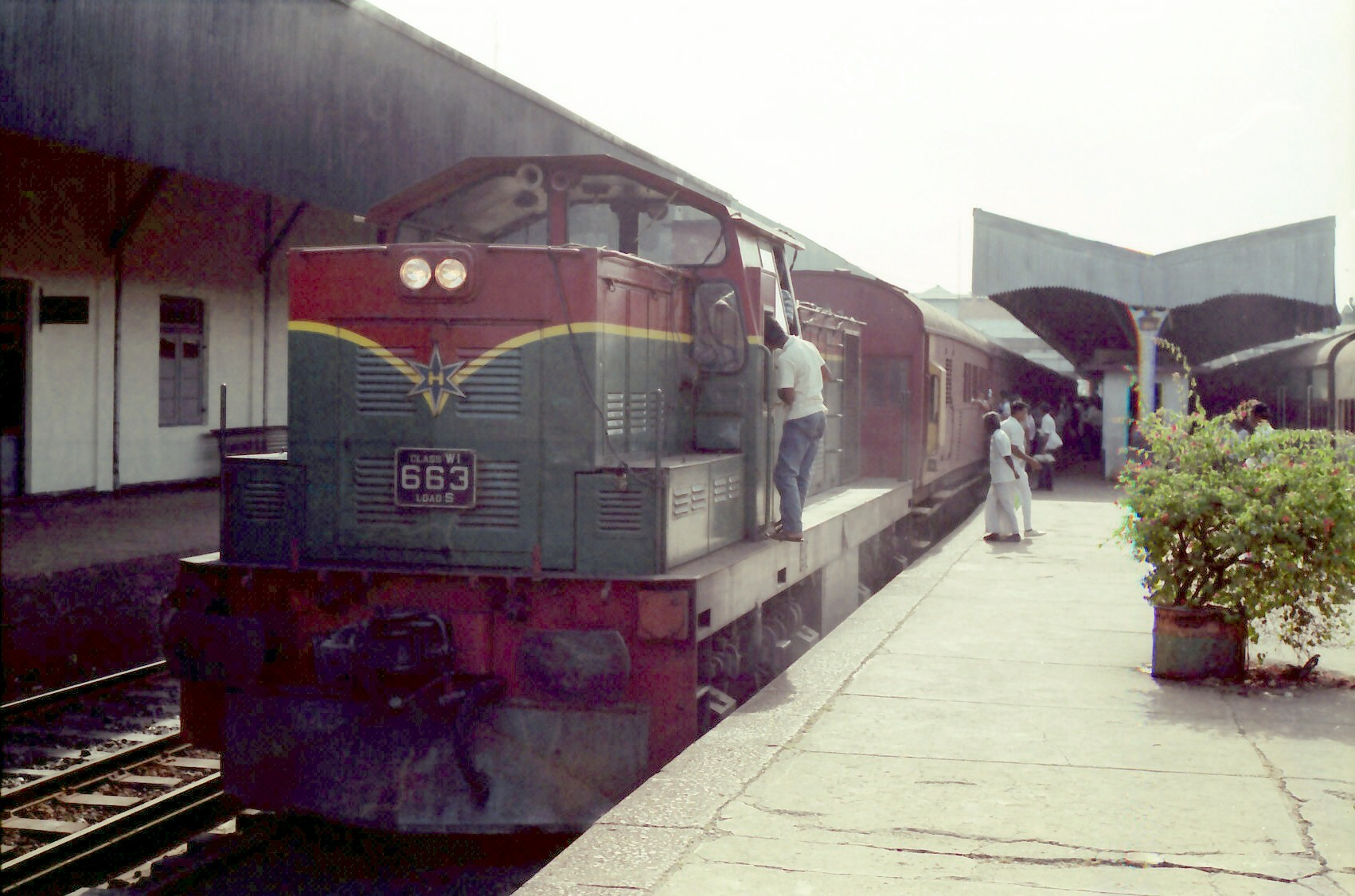
- W1 No. 663
Type and origin
- Power type: Diesel-hydraulic
- Builder: Rheinstahl Henschel
- Model: DHG-1200
- Build date: 1969
- Total produced: 45
- Rebuilder: Sri Lanka Railways
Specifications
- Configuration
  - AAR: B-B
  - UIC: B′B′
- Gauge: 1,676 mm (5 ft 6 in)
- Length: 12.8 metres (41 ft 11 7/8 in)
- Loco weight: 60.5 t (59.5 long tons; 66.7 short tons)
- Prime mover: Paxman 12YJXL
- RPM range: 1500
- Engine type: V12 4 stroke diesel
- Transmission: Voith L 520 R U2
- Train brakes: Vacuum
Performance figures
- Maximum speed: 80 km/h (50 mph)
- Power output: 1,150 hp (860 kW)
Career
- Operators: Sri Lanka Railways
- Class: W1
- Number in class: 45
- Locale: Sri Lanka
- Delivered: 1969
- Retired: 1995
- Disposition: One operational
- 10 locomotives from W1 class were later fitted with new engines and renumbered as W3 class.

Sri Lanka Railways W1 is a class of Sri Lankan diesel-hydraulic locomotive that was built by Rheinstahl Henschel in 1969 for use by Sri Lanka Railways (SLR). This is the first diesel-hydraulic locomotive to run on Sri Lankan rails.

== Origins ==
Forty-five W1s were imported to Sri Lanka in 1969, which made the W1 the most numerous class of SLR locomotive that time. During that time period, the only operational diesel locomotives were the Class M1 and M2. Most other services were carried out by steam locomotives. But with the introduction of W1s, most steam locomotives were taken out of service and the services operated by them were taken over by the diesels.

== In Service ==
The W1 along with the M6 classes were used to operate Main Line trains such as the Udarata Menike and Podi Menike for about 25 years until 1995.

The Class W1 locomotive can be operated on any of Sri Lanka's railway lines.With the declination of the W1s, two locomotives (Nos. 650 & 657) were fitted with new Paxman VEGA SE/RP 160 prime movers with a power output of power 1250hp.

== Decline ==
By the 1990's, most of W1s were out of service owing to problems in the prime mover. Some units were afflicted serious damages due to accidents; these condemned locomotives were scrapped. By 2011, only 2 units were in running condition; these were used for light duties. By 2012, none of the W1s were operational excluding No. 657, which was a yard shunter at Dematagoda in 2016.

== Class W3 ==
Sri Lanka Railways W3
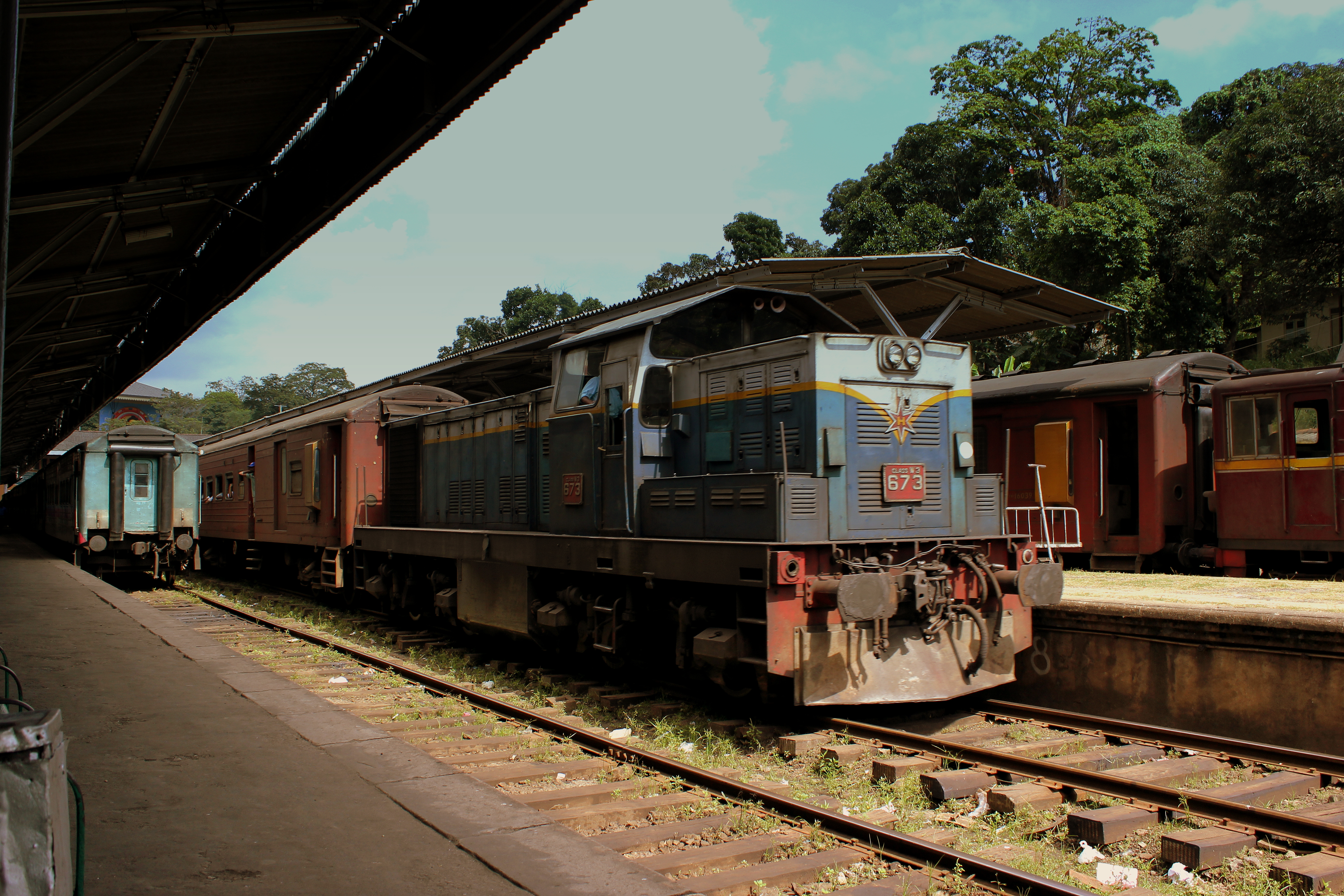
- W3 No. 673
Type and origin
- Power type: Diesel-hydraulic
- Model: DH3 1200
- Rebuilder: Sri Lanka Railways, Adtranz
- Rebuild date: 1997
- Number rebuilt: 10
Specifications
- Configuration
  - AAR: B-B
- Gauge: 1,676 mm (5 ft 6 in)
- Prime mover: Caterpillar 3512 DI-TA
- Transmission: Voith L 520 R U2
- MU working: Yes
- Loco brake: Air, Hydro-Dynamic
- Train brakes: Air, Vacuum
Performance figures
- Power output: 1,200 hp (890 kW)
Career
- Numbers: 631, 636, 638, 647, 659, 665, 666, 667, 669 and 673
- Disposition: Active

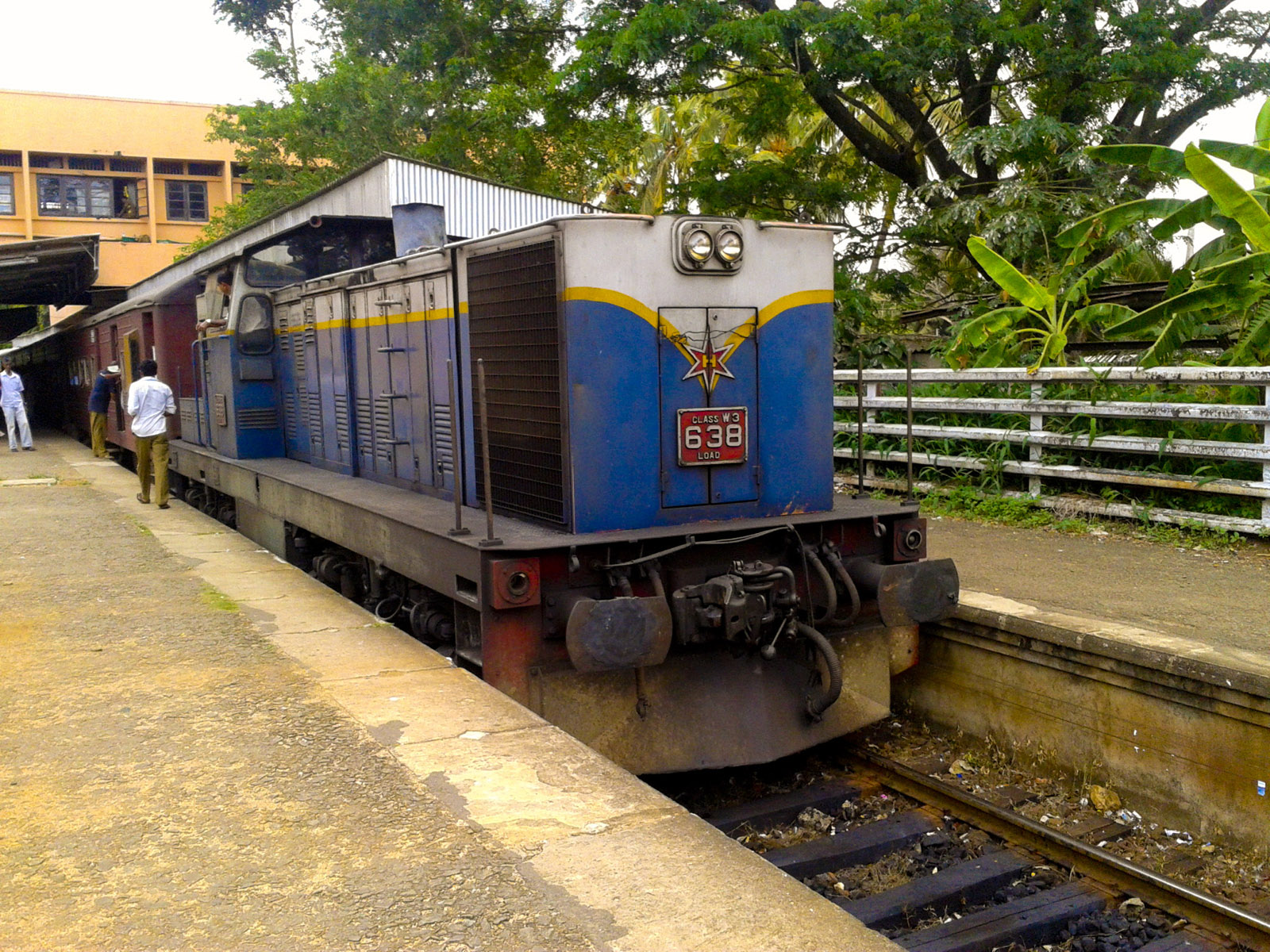
Class W3

In 1997, 10 Class W1 locomotives were extensively refurbished. Sri Lanka Railways and Adtranz were involved in this process. During this refurbishment, the locomotives were fitted with new power plants, power transmission systems and electronic engine control systems, and given a new Blue and silver livery.

These extensively modified W1s were classified as the Class W3. All of these locomotives are still in active service today.

== See also ==
- Diesel locomotives of Sri Lanka
- Sri Lanka Railways W2
