= Sri Lanka Railways S10 =

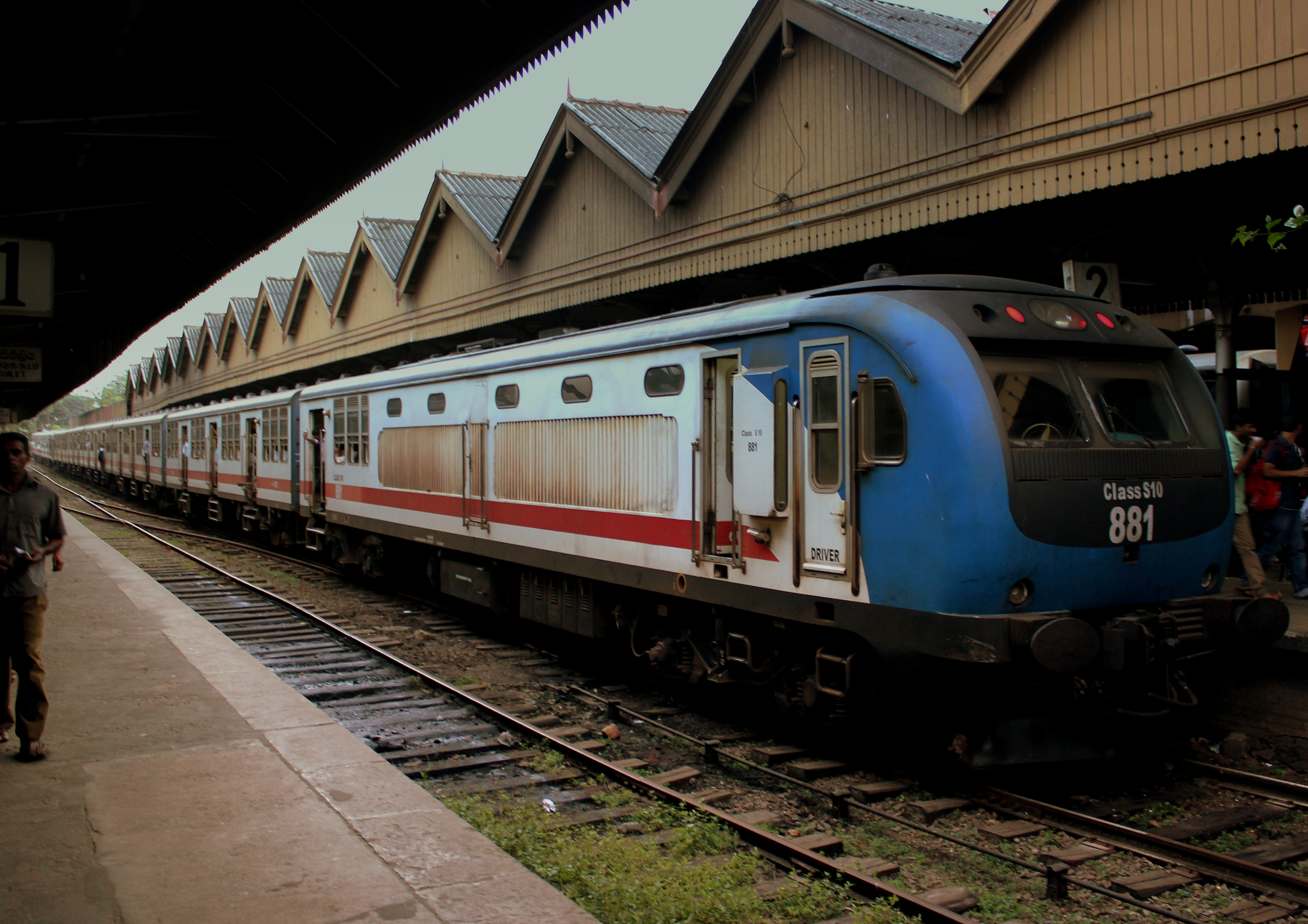
- S10 DEMU No. 881

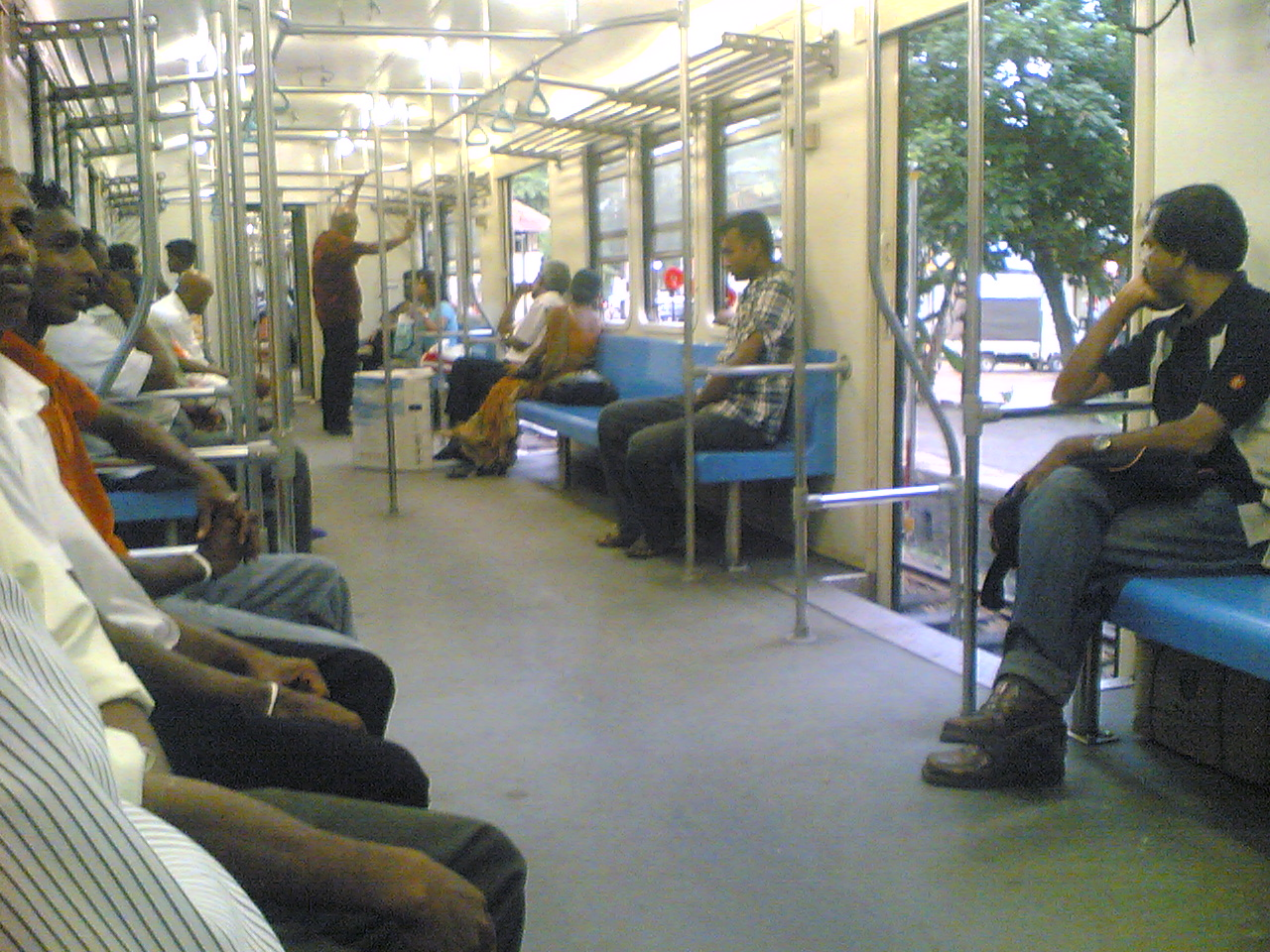
- S10 DEMU Interiors
- Stock type: Diesel-Electric Multiple Unit
- In service: 2008-present
- Manufacturer: China South Locomotive & Rolling Stock Corporation Limited
- Built at: Qingdao, China
- Constructed: 2008
- Number built: 15
- Number in service: 15
- Formation: DPC + 4 TC + DTC
- Capacity: 240
- Operators: Sri Lanka Railways

Specifications
- Car length: 65 ft (19.81 m)
- Maximum speed: 100 km/h (62 mph)
- Weight: 76 t (75 long tons; 84 short tons)
- Prime mover(s): MTU 12V4000R41
- Engine type: V12 diesel
- Power output: 2,000 hp (1,500 kW)
- Transmission: On-board Diesel-electric AC/DC
- Braking system(s): Air, Dynamic
- Coupling system: Automatic (dual)
- Track gauge: 5 ft 6 in (1,676 mm)

Sri Lanka Railways S10 is a class of Diesel-electric multiple unit (DEMU) train set built for Sri Lanka Railways by China South Locomotive & Rolling Stock Corporation and imported in 2008. Fifteen S10 DEMUs were ordered to strengthen commuter services on crucial commuter lines.

== Technical specifications ==
At nearly 2,000 hp (1,500 kW) the Class S10 provides power outputs to give high rates of acceleration and passenger capacity.

The engine is equipped with common rail diesel injection technology which helps to control internal combustion correctly. The alternating current which is produced by the generator is converted to direct current and transferred to traction motors. A computer system is installed to control most of the activities of the engine. The driving cab consists of a desk type control stand and touch-sensitive visual display unit. The Class S10 can also be used for multiple unit working and up to three train sets can be coupled with one another.

Class S10 DEMU Formation
Formation	Number of Cars	Key
DPC + 4 TC + DTC	6	DPC - Driving Power Coach; TC - Trailer Coach; DTC - Driving Trailer Coach

The Class 10 possesses only Third class interiors as it is used exclusively for commuter services.

== Operations ==
The Class S10 can be used on any line except the Kelani Valley Line, owing to the great length of the coach bodies being unable to traverse the line's tight curves. S10s are commonly used in stopping passenger services.

Notable S10 operating routes
Line	Starting Station	Terminus Station
Main Line	Colombo Fort	Rambukkana
Northern Line	Colombo Fort	Maho Junction
Coastal Line	Colombo Fort	Aluthgama

== Gallery ==
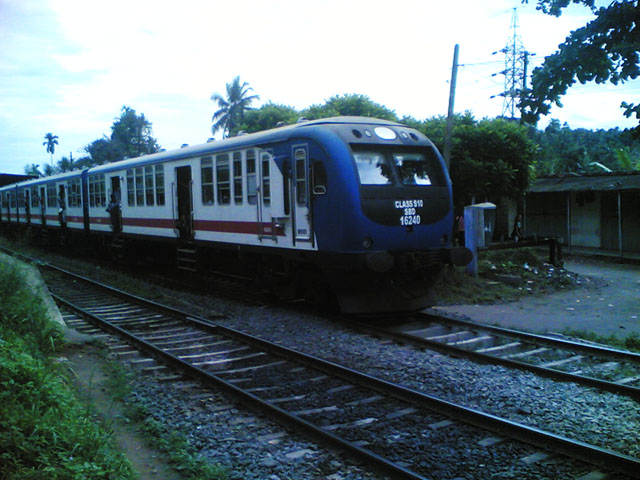

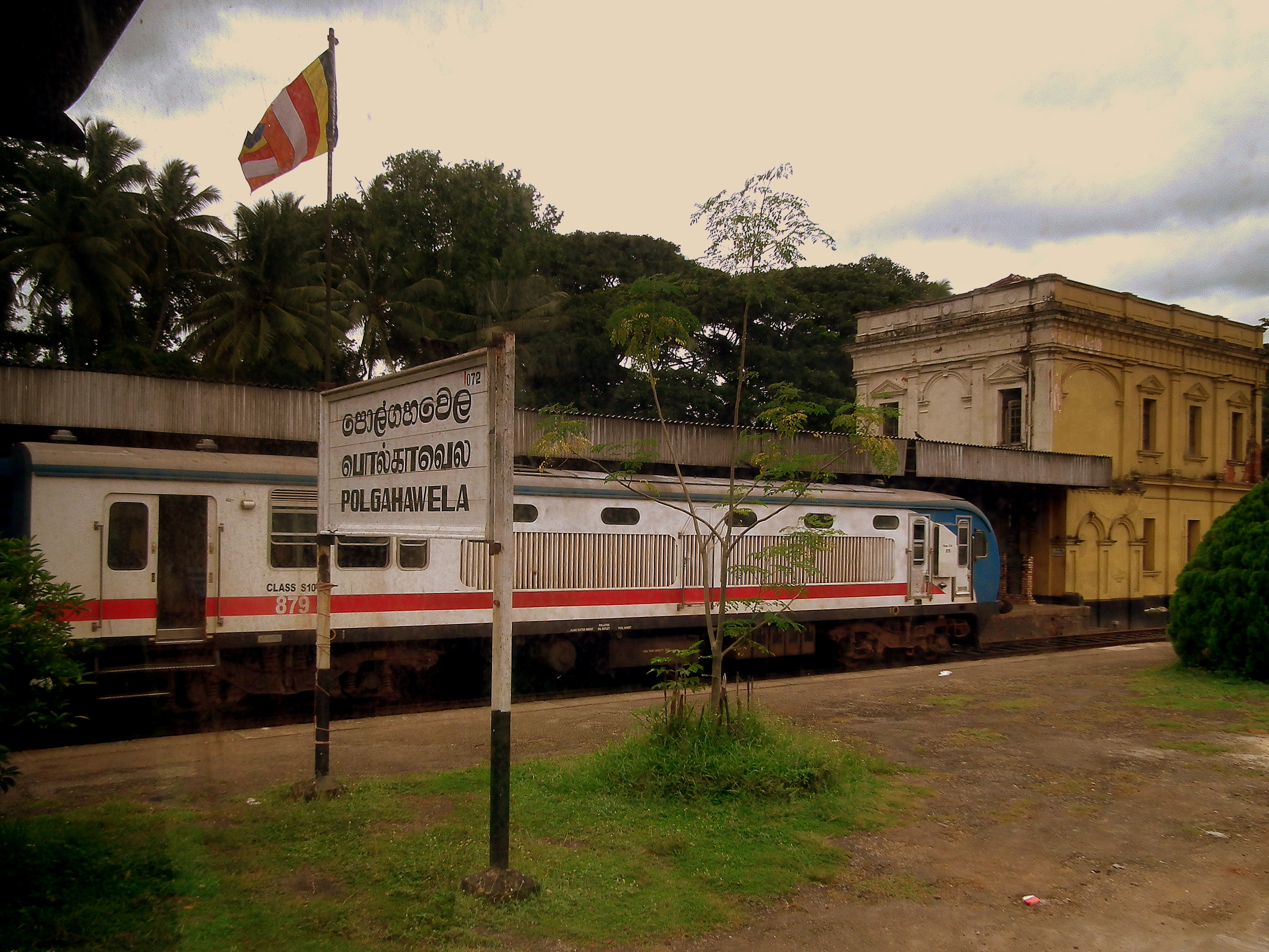

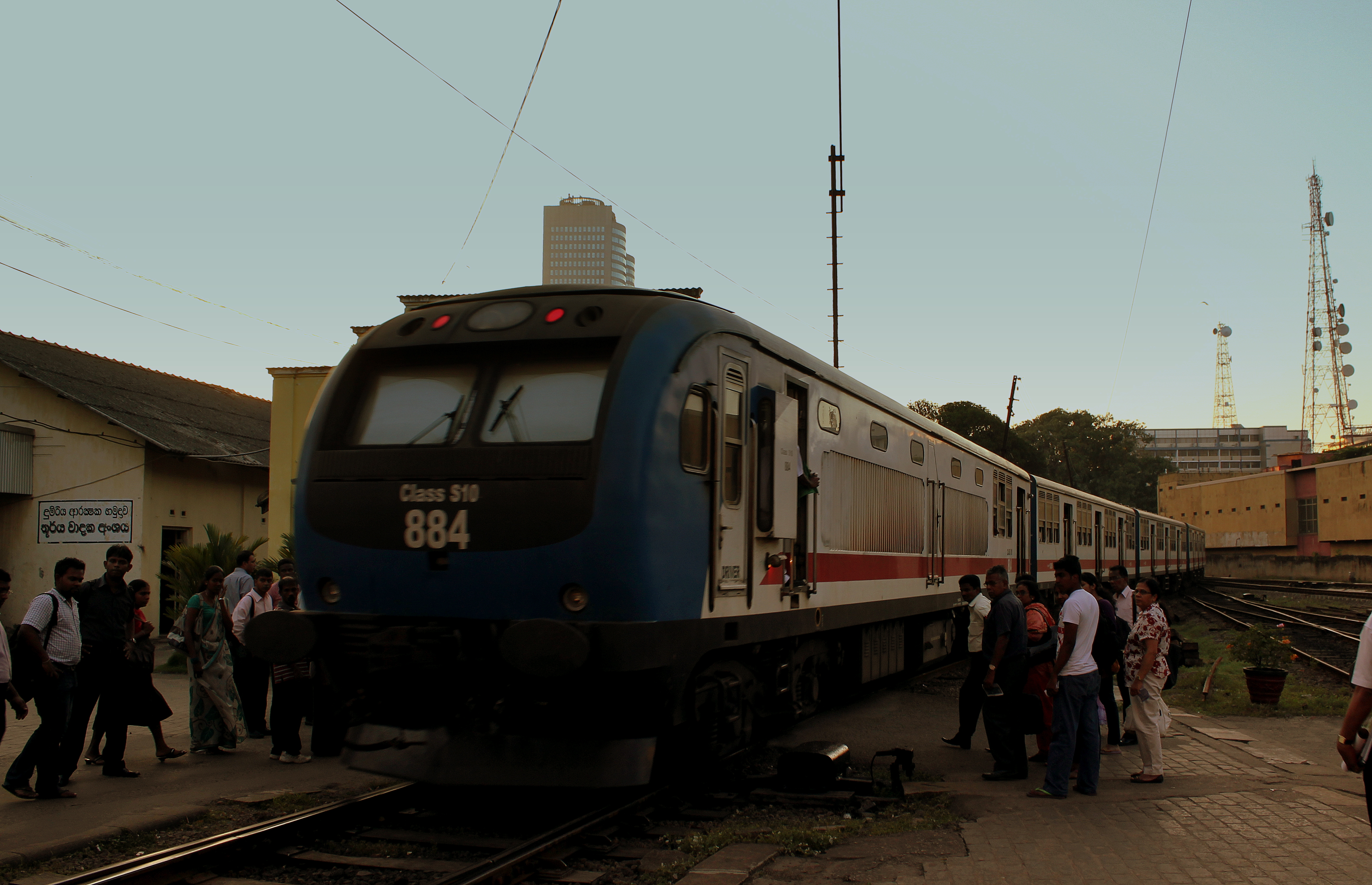

== See also ==
- Sri Lanka Railways
- Diesel locomotives of Sri Lanka
