= Sri Lanka Railways M5 =

Type of person diesel-electric locomotive

Class M5
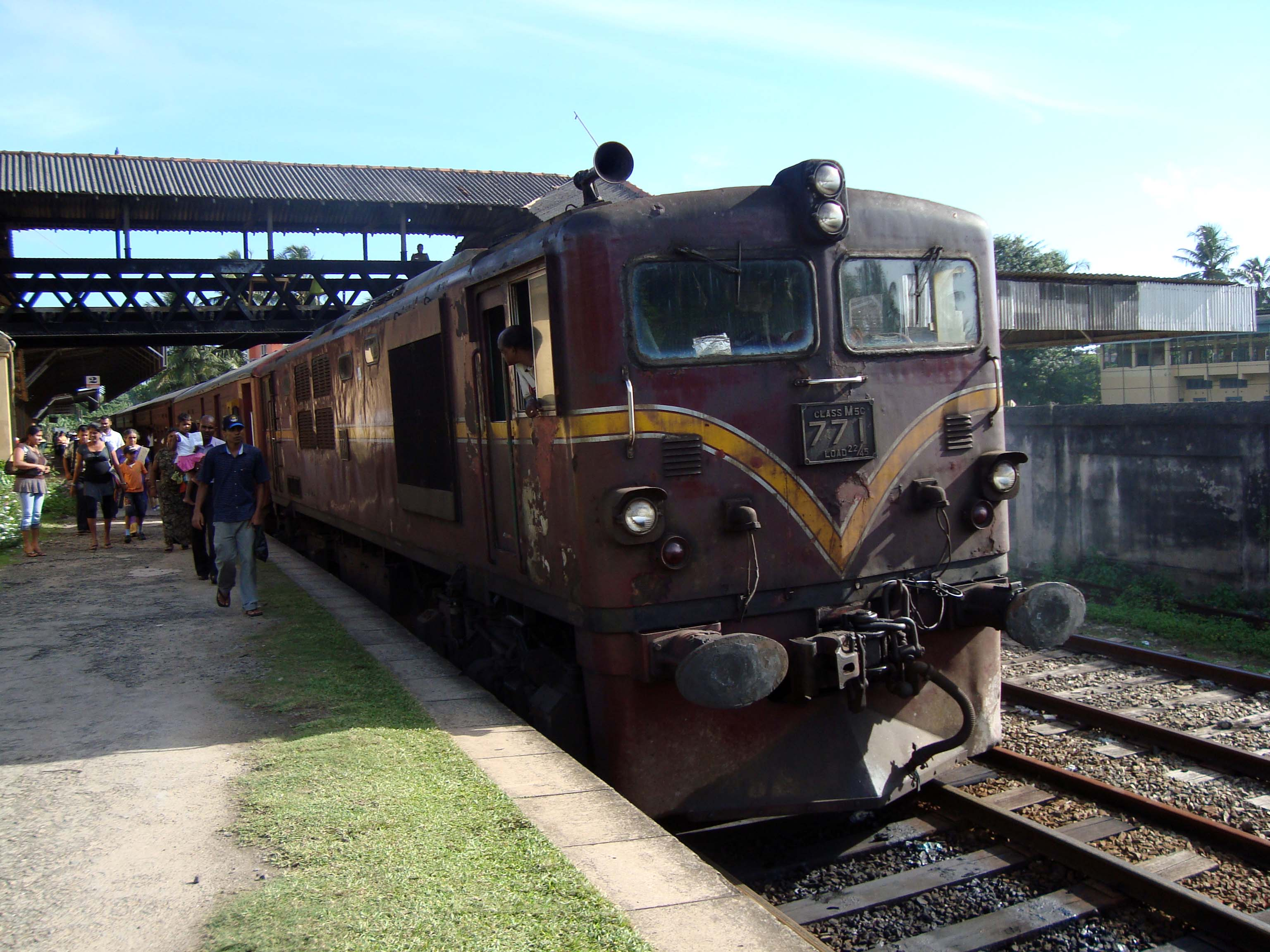
- Sub-class M5C
Type and origin
- Power type: Diesel
- Builder: Original: Hitachi
- Build date: 1979
- Total produced: 16
- Rebuilder: Sri Lanka Railways
Specifications
- Configuration
  - AAR: B-B
  - UIC: Bo'Bo'
- Gauge: 1,676 mm (5 ft 6 in)
- Loco weight: 66 t (65 long tons; 73 short tons)
- Fuel type: Diesel fuel
- Prime mover: Original: MTU-Ikegai 12V652TD11; M5A: MTU 396TC13; M5B: Paxman Valenta RP200L; M5C: Caterpillar 3516 DITA
- Engine type: All four V12 Diesel engines
- Transmission: Diesel-electric
Performance figures
- Maximum speed: 60 mph (97 km/h)
- Power output: Original: 1,640 hp (1,220 kW), M5A: 1,150 hp (860 kW), M5B: 1,150 hp (860 kW), M5C: (1600hp)
Career
- Operators: Sri Lanka Railways
- Class: M5, M5A, M5B, M5C
- Number in class: 16
- Locale: Sri Lanka
- Disposition: M5B & M5C

The Sri Lanka Railways Class M5 is a type of diesel-electric locomotive. The class was ordered to strengthen the diesel locomotive fleet of Sri Lanka Railways.

The Class M5 became a familiar sight on Main Line of SLR. They performed on Sri Lanka's railroad for few years.

Sub-class M5B and M5C are currently used in Upcountry Commuter Rails.

== History ==
=== Background ===
In order to replace steam locomotives and also to increase the diesel locomotive fleet of SLR, 16 diesel-electric locomotives were ordered from Hitachi and were delivered in 1979.

=== Decline ===
After few years of operation, due to technical problems, M5 class locomotives were taken out of service.

== Sub-Classes ==
Considering the decline of original Class M5 locomotives, SLR refurbished some selected M5 locomotives as a part of the Transportation Rehabilitation Project. Refurbished locomotives were allocated in to 3 sub-classes namely, M5A, M5B and M5C.

Sub Class	Image	Description
M5A		M5 No. 769 was fitted with a new prime mover of model MTU V12 396TC13 which was a spare prime mover of a S8 DMU. Condemned due to an electrical failure.
M5B		4 locomotives (Nos 768, 772, 777 and 778) were fitted with new Paxman Valenta V12 RP200L prime movers. In Use.
M5C		The M5 locomotives 767, 771, 776, 779, 781, 782 and 775 were fitted with new Caterpillar prime movers. This new locomotive class was called M5C. This class M5Cs known to Sri Lankan railway enthusiasts as "Cat"

== Incidents ==
Locomotives 773 and 780 were damaged due to accidents. Both are out of service. The last M5C locomotive was released in 2010. This locomotive was fitted with air brakes.

== See also ==
Diesel locomotives of Sri Lanka
