= Sri Lanka Railways M7 =

Class of M7 Sri Lanka diesel-electric locomotives

Sri Lanka Railways Class M7
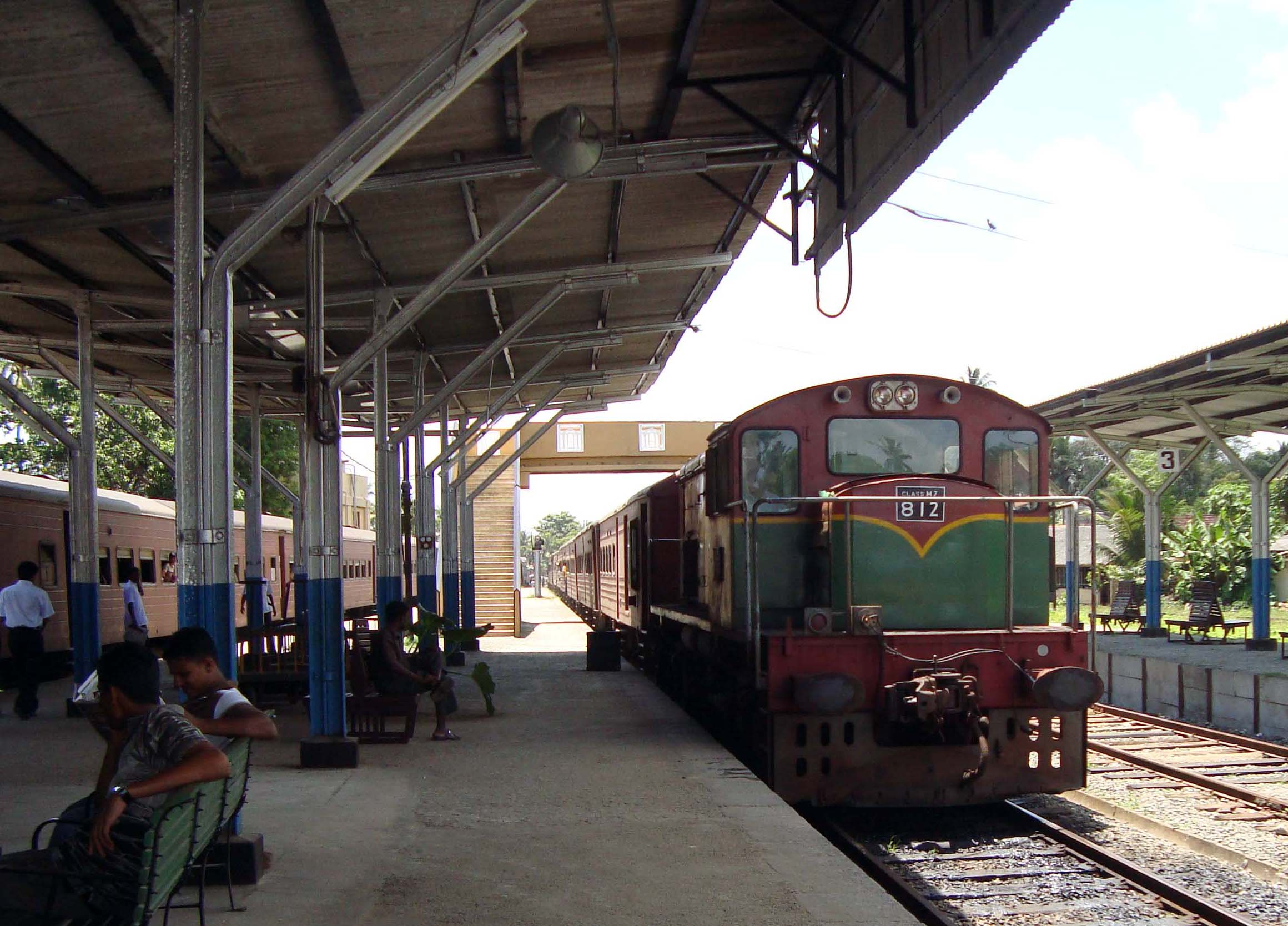
- Class M7 Locomotive
Type and origin
- Power type: Diesel
- Builder: Brush Traction
- Build date: 1981
- Total produced: 16
Specifications
- Gauge: 1,676 mm (5 ft 6 in)
- Length: 12.8 m (41 ft 11 7/8 in)
- Loco weight: 66 tons
- Prime mover: GM 8-645E
- Engine type: V8 2 stroke diesel
- Transmission: Diesel-electric
Performance figures
- Maximum speed: 80 km/h (50 mph)
- Power output: 994 hp (741 kW)
Career
- Operators: Sri Lanka Railways
- Number in class: 16
- Numbers: 799 ~ 814
- Delivered: 1981
- Disposition: Active, except N0. 803
- N0. 803 was condemned

Class M7 is a type of diesel-electric locomotive built for Sri Lanka Railways by Brush Traction, UK, and imported in 1981. This locomotive has the shortest length, least power and least weight compared to other diesel locomotives of Sri Lanka.

== History ==
Three locomotives (803, 813, 814) were painted in a special color scheme and later was painted in normal livery.

In 1999 M7 locomotive No. 803 met with an accident and was seriously damaged and condemned.

== Usage ==
This locomotive was introduced as a shunter by the manufacturer, Brush Traction. In Sri Lanka, these are mostly used in short passenger services. M7s are not permitted on the Main Line because of the low power and lack of dynamic braking but it can be run on all the other of the railway lines in Sri Lanka including the Kelani Valley Line.

== Gallery ==
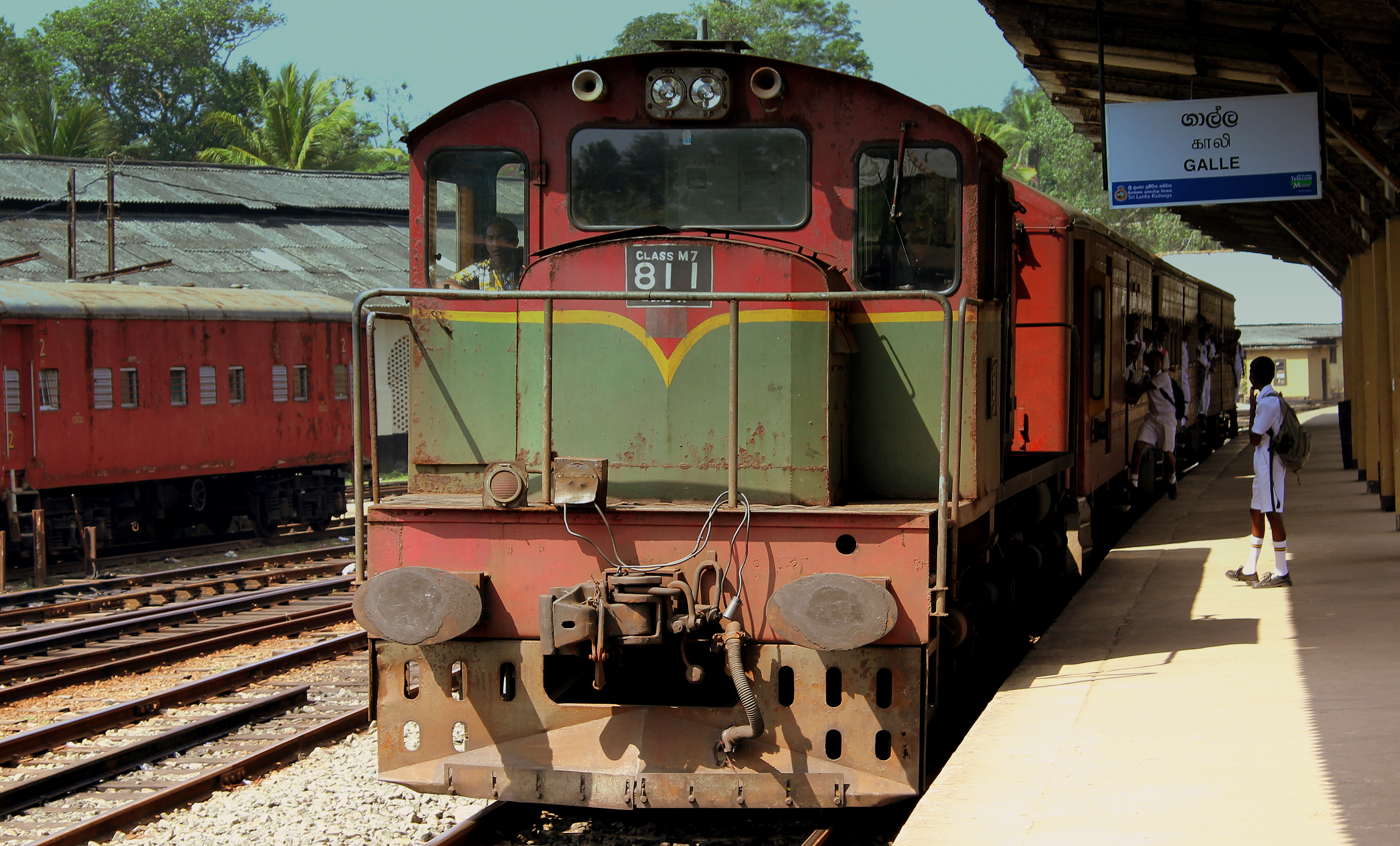
A M7 at Galle station

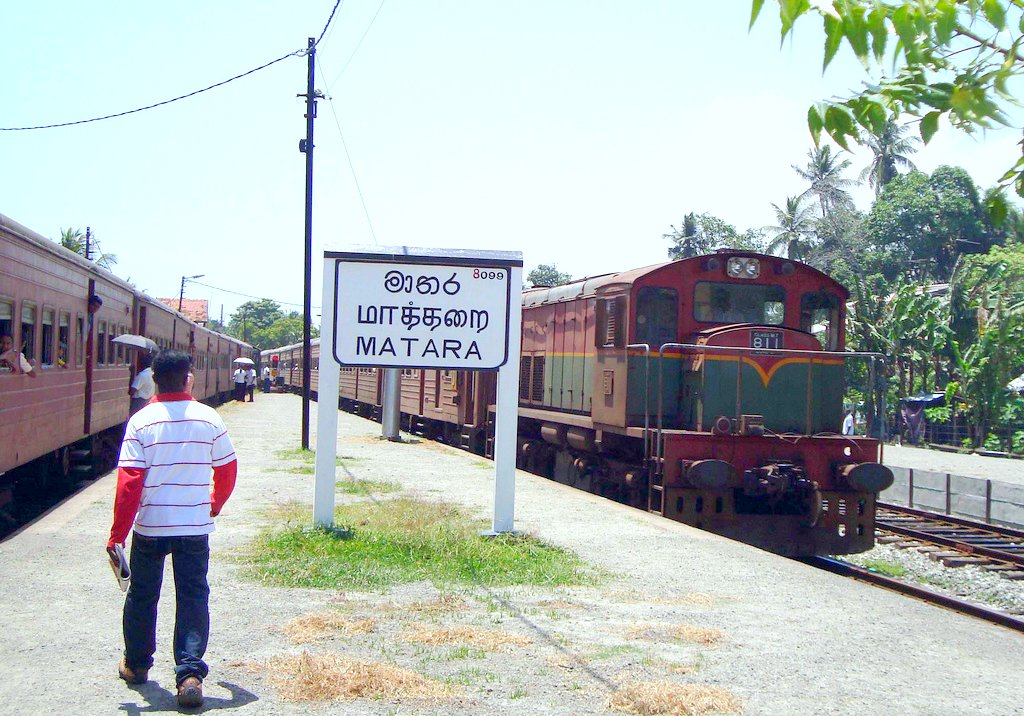
M7 pulling a train to Matara station.
