= Sri Lanka Railways M11 =

Class of M11 diesel-electric locomotives

Class M11
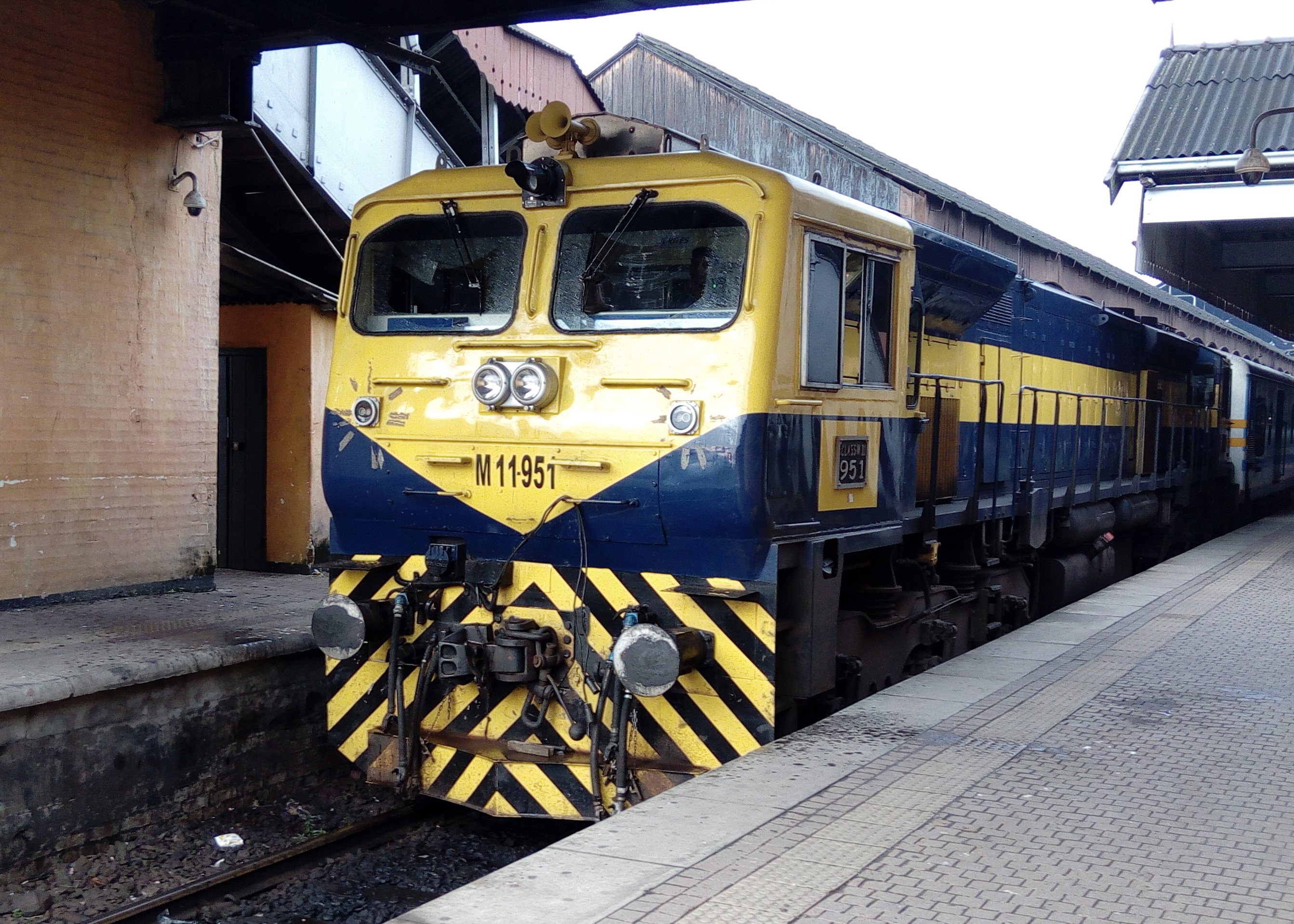
- Class M11 No. 951
Type and origin
- Power type: Diesel Electric
- Builder: Banaras Locomotive Works, India
- Build date: 2018-2019
- Total produced: 10
Specifications
- Configuration
  - AAR: C-C
  - UIC: Co'Co'
- Gauge: Broad Gauge - 5 ft 6 in (1,676 mm)
- Bogies: HTSC Fabricated Bogies
- Wheel diameter: 1,092 mm (42.992 in)
- Pivot centres: 14,905 mm (48.901 ft)
- Length
  - Over beams: 21,000 mm (68.898 ft)
- Width: 3,062 mm (10.046 ft)
- Height: 4,165 mm (13.665 ft)
- Axle load: 20T
- Loco weight: 120T
- Fuel type: diesel
- Prime mover: EMD 12-710G3B-ES
- RPM range: 200-904 rpm
- Engine type: V12 Two-stroke diesel engine
- Aspiration: Turbo-supercharged
- Displacement: 139.53 L
- Alternator: TA12/CA9
- Traction motors: EMD A2916-8 (AC Traction motors)
- Cylinders: 12
- Cylinder size: 230.19 mm × 279.4 mm (9.063 in × 11.000 in)
- Transmission: Diesel-electric, EM2000 microprocessor controlled AC-AC transmission
- Gear ratio: 77:17
- MU working: AAR
- Loco brake: Air Brake
- Train brakes: Air Brake
Performance figures
- Maximum speed: 120 km/h (75 mph)
- Power output: 3,200 hp (2,400 kW)
- Tractive effort: 500 kN (110,000 lb_{f})
- Dynamic brake peak effort: 230 kN (52,000 lb_{f})
Career
- Operators: Sri Lanka Railways
- Class: Class M11
- Number in class: 10
- Numbers: 949-958
- Locale: Sri Lanka
- Current owner: Sri Lanka Railways
- Disposition: Active

Class M11 is a mainline diesel-electric locomotive built by Banaras Locomotive Works, India, for use on Sri Lanka Railways and first delivered in 2018. This locomotive, clearly with its look, was developed from the WDG-4D (EMD JT46ACe) locomotive of the Indian Railways, which is originally of 4500 hp (3.4 MW), as it uses a 16-cylinder variant of the EMD 710 prime mover. The HP was derated to 3200 hp (2.38 MW) using a 12-cylinder variant of the same engine, making it similar to British/European Railways' popular Class 66 (EMD JT42CWR/M) locomotive, but with AC-AC traction (EMD JT42ACe)

The completed units are delivered by road trailer from Varanasi to the port of Chennai, before shipment to Sri Lanka. The units feature a microprocessor control system, TFT monitors as display units and roof-mounted Dynamic Brake Resistors. The locomotives were built under the auspices of the Make in India program.

As of January 2020, ten M 11 locomotives have been purchased under an Indian loan, with 8 being brought into the country. A total of 10 locomotives and 6 power sets were purchased for Rs 1000 million.

Local railway trade unions have expressed concern that the locomotives are not suitable for the rail lines in Sri Lanka. Union officials say the locomotives are too long to safely operate on local rail lines, being longer than any locomotive in service in Sri Lanka. They also note that the locomotives are equipped with an air compressor brake system, while most carriages in use in Sri Lanka have vacuum brakes, noting that the new M11s can't be used with most carriages in the country other than recently imported Chinese coaches.

The union officials also explain that railway lines in Sri Lanka are not maintained to such a high standard as they are in India and that using a high horsepower locomotive to pull only a few carriages seemed wasteful. Major rail lines would need to be rebuilt in order to use the M11 locomotives to their full potential. The locomotives are deemed unsuitable by their operators for their tasks they are assigned, putting public safety at risk. Union officials have expressed concern that government officials received large commissions when the locomotives were delivered. Railway officials have said all allegations are baseless.

A significant accident occurred when M11 number 953 derailed on 19 December 2019 on the line between Maradana and Dermatagoda stations, causing the line to be shut down for two days. The Puttalam and Kelani Valley lines were also affected by the accident.

== See also ==
- Diesel locomotives of Sri Lanka
- Indian locomotive class WDG-4
- EMD Class 66
