= Ceylon Government Railway B1-B6 =

The Ceylon Government Railway classes B1–B6, formerly designated as the NOA class before the reclassification of 1937, were several classes of 4-6-0 steam locomotives of similar designs operated on the Ceylon Government Railway (CGR) for service on the Main Line. As of 2025, only certain locomotives of the B1 and B2 classes survive into preservation.

== Class B1 ==
Ceylon Government Railway B1
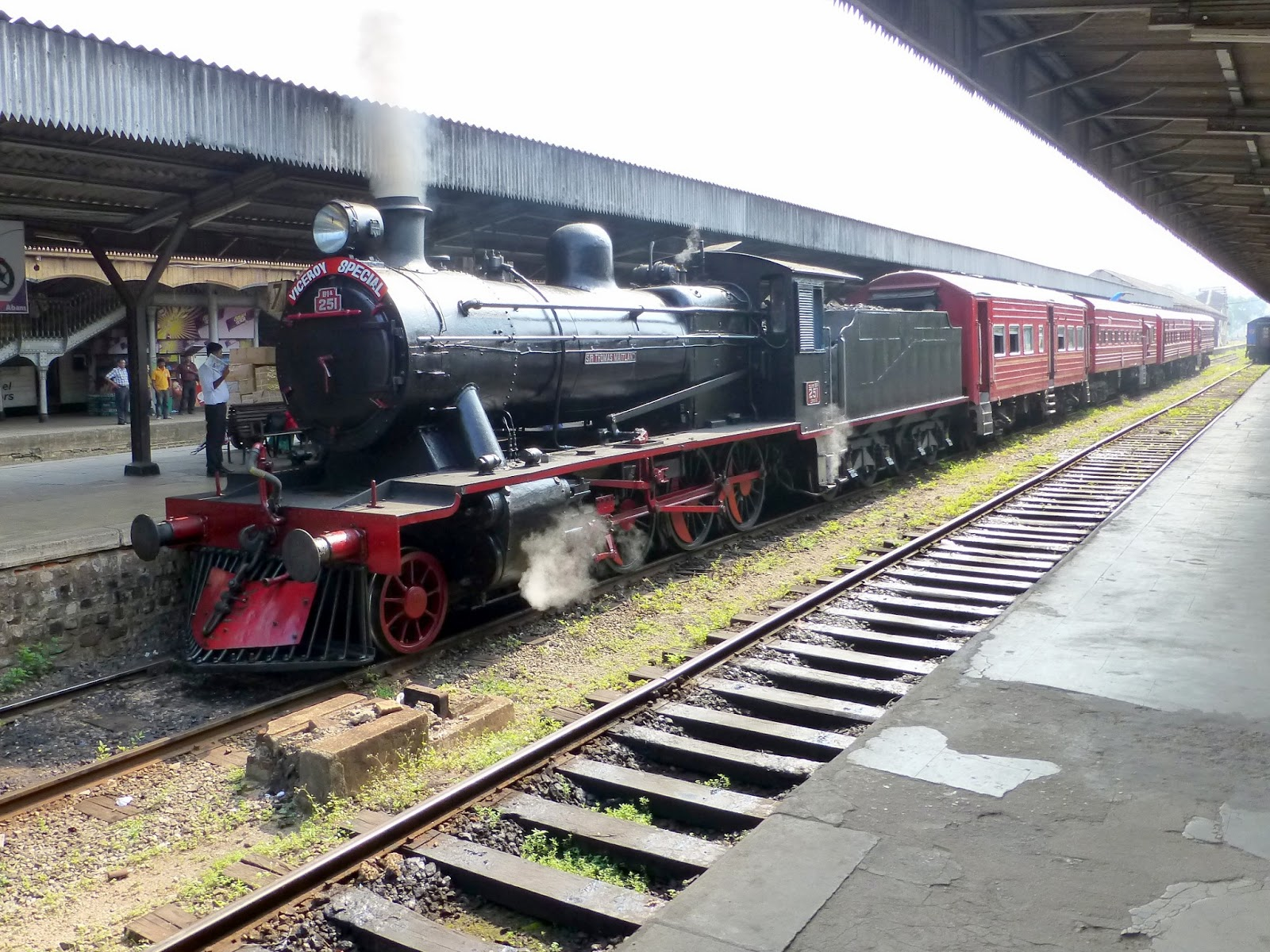
- B1A No. 251 "Sir Thomas Maitland" hauling the Viceroy Special
Type and origin
- Power type: Steam
- Builder: Beyer, Peacock & Company (B1, B1A/C); Armstrong Whitworth (B1B); Robert Stephenson & Company (B1D/E)
- Build date: 1927-1930 (B1 to B1C); 1945 (B1D); 1948 (B1E)
- Total produced: 49
Specifications
- Configuration
  - Whyte: 4-6-0
- Gauge: 5 ft 6 in (1,676 mm)
- Driver dia.: 53.5 in (1.359 m)
- Length: 58 ft 7.5 in
- Axle load: 13.50 long ton (B1 to B1C); 13.40 long ton (B1D/E)
- Loco weight: 52.30 long ton (B1 to B1C); 53.05 long ton (B1D/E)
- Tender weight: 42.55 long ton (B1 to B1C); 45.55 long ton (B1D/E)
- Fuel type: Coal, Oil
- Water cap.: 3300 gal
- Boiler
  - Diameter: 4 ft 8 in
- Boiler pressure: 160 lb/sq.in
- Cylinders: 2
- Cylinder size: 18.5 in × 26 in (470 mm × 660 mm)
- Valve gear: Walschaerts
Performance figures
- Tractive effort: 22,620 lbf
Career
- Operators: Ceylon Government Railway
- Nicknames: Governor Class
- Disposition: Two preserved, remainder scrapped

=== History ===
The Class B1 locomotives were the last and most modern of these six locomotive classes to be constructed. A total of forty-nine were built for the Ceylon Government Railway from 1927 to 1948. This class had five subclasses apart from the standard model, namely A, B, C, D and E. These locomotives are also known as the Governor Class, as most class members were named after governors of British Ceylon. In 1936, class member no. 242 Sir Edward Paget was streamlined, but the streamlining was later removed in 1937. In the 1950s, some members of the class were converted to burn oil instead of coal.

=== Locomotives ===
Number	Name	Final Subclass	Fuel	Status	Notes
4	Sir Edward Stubbs		Coal	Scrapped	
30	Sir Thomas Maitland		Coal	Scrapped	
242	Sir Edward Paget		Coal	Scrapped	The only class member to be fitted with a streamlined casing.
243	Sir West Ridgeway		Coal, Oil	Scrapped	
244	Viscount Torrington		Coal, Oil	Scrapped	
245	Sir Robert Chalmers		Coal	Scrapped	
246	Sir William Anderson		Coal	Scrapped	
247	James MacKenzie		Coal	Scrapped	
248	Sir William Gregory		Coal	Scrapped	
249	Sir William Anderson	A	Coal	Scrapped	
250	Sir Charles MacCarthy	A	Coal, Oil	Scrapped	
251	Sir Thomas Maitland	A	Coal	Preserved	
252	Sir Edward Barnes	A	Coal	Scrapped	
253	Sir Richard North	A	Coal	Scrapped	
254	Sir Arthur Havelock	A	Coal	Scrapped	
255	Sir Robert Chalmers	A	Coal, Oil	Scrapped	
256	Sir Robert Horton	A	Coal	Scrapped	
257	Ceylon Defence Force	A	Coal, Oil	Scrapped	
258	Sir Hercules Robinson	A	Coal	Scrapped	
259		A	Coal	Scrapped	
260		A	Coal	Scrapped	
261	Sir William Manning	A	Coal, Oil	Scrapped	
262	King George VI	A	Coal, Oil	Scrapped	
279	Sir Henry Ward	B	Coal, Oil	Scrapped	
280		B	Coal, Oil	Scrapped	
281	Sir Hugh Clifford	B	Coal, Oil	Scrapped	
282		B		Scrapped	
283	Sir Thomas Maitland	B	Coal, Oil	Scrapped	
284	James MacKenzie	B	Coal, Oil	Scrapped	
285	Sir Henry Blake	B	Coal	Scrapped	
286	Sir Graeme Thompson	B	Coal	Scrapped	
287	Sir Robert Brownrigg	B	Coal	Scrapped	
288	Sir Herbert Stanley	B	Coal	Scrapped	
289		B	Coal	Scrapped	
290	Sir Arthur Gordon	B	Coal	Scrapped	
294	Sir James Longden	C	Coal	Scrapped	
295	Sir Andrew Caldecott	C	Coal	Scrapped	
337	Sir Geoffrey Layton	C	Coal	Scrapped	
338	Sir Henry Moore	C	Coal, Oil	Scrapped	
339		D	Coal	Scrapped	
340/352	Fredrick North	D	Coal, Oil	Scrapped	
341		D	Coal, Oil	Scrapped	
342		D	Coal	Scrapped	
351		E	Coal	Scrapped	
352	Frederick North	E	Coal, Oil	Preserved	
353		E	Coal	Scrapped	
354	Sir Henry Ward	E	Coal, Oil	Scrapped	
355		E	Coal	Scrapped	
356		E	Coal, Oil	Scrapped	

=== Preservation ===
Only two members of the class, No. 251 Sir Thomas Maitland and No. 340 Sir Frederick North, have survived into preservation. Both are currently operational and are used to haul the Viceroy Special, a chartered excursion train operated by J. F. Tours.

== Class B2 ==
Ceylon Government Railway B2
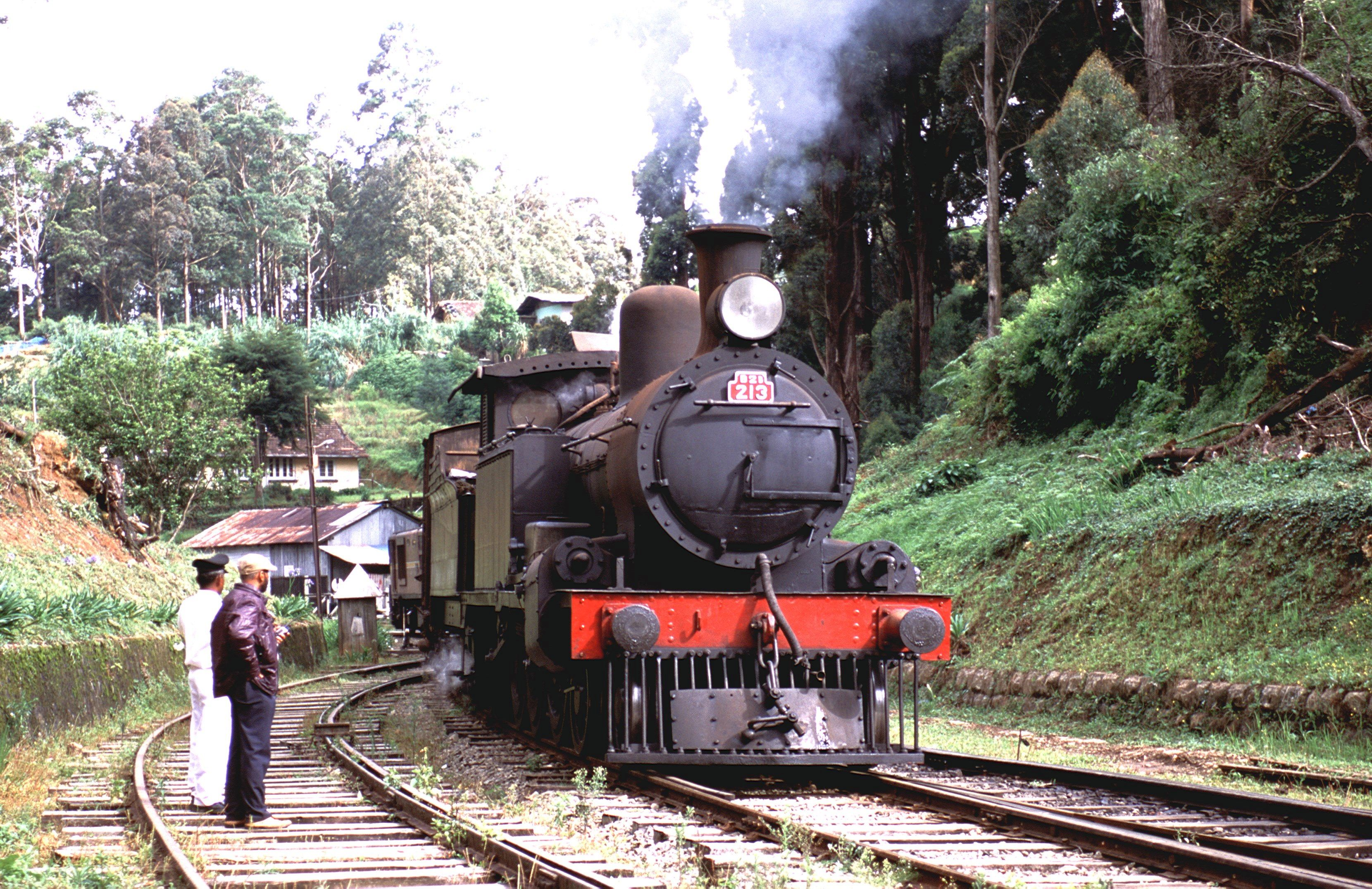
- B2B No. 213, the only surviving member of the class
Type and origin
- Power type: Steam
- Builder: Stephenson (B2); Vulcan (B2A/B/C/D); Kitson (B2E)
- Build date: 1920-1921 (B2); 1925-1926 (B2A/C/D); 1922 (B2B); 1915 (B2E)
- Total produced: 35
Specifications
- Configuration
  - Whyte: 4-6-0TT
- Gauge: 5 ft 6 in (1,676 mm)
- Driver dia.: 53.5 in (1.359 m)
- Length: 53 ft 2 in
- Axle load: 13.50 long ton
- Loco weight: 54.85 long ton
- Tender weight: 32.50 long ton
- Fuel type: Coal
- Water cap.: 2400 + 400 gal (SIde tanks)
- Boiler
  - Diameter: 4 ft 8 in
- Boiler pressure: 160 lb/sq.in
- Cylinders: 2
- Cylinder size: 18.5 in × 26 in (470 mm × 660 mm)
Performance figures
- Tractive effort: 22,620 lbf
Career
- Operators: Ceylon Government Railway
- Disposition: One preserved, remainder scrapped

=== History ===
A total of thirty-five members of this class were produced for the Ceylon Government Railway. The Class B2 also had various subclasses excluding the original from A to E.

=== Locomotives ===
Subclass	B2	A	B	C	D	E
Numbers	28	1	208	227	40	25
Numbers	29	3	209	228	43	26
Numbers	39	47	210		44	27
Numbers	193	222	211		45
Numbers	194	223	212		46
Numbers	195	224	213
Numbers	196	225
Numbers	204	226
Numbers	205
Numbers	206
Numbers	207

=== Preservation ===
Only one member, No. 213, survives into preservation. It is also maintained in working order so as to haul the Viceroy Special.

== Class B3 ==
Ceylon Government Railway B3
Type and origin
- Power type: Steam
- Builder: Kitson
- Build date: 1913-1914
- Total produced: 16
Specifications
- Configuration
  - Whyte: 4-6-0TT
- Gauge: 5 ft 6 in (1,676 mm)
- Driver dia.: 53.5 in (1.359 m)
- Length: 53 ft 7 in
- Axle load: 13.50 long ton
- Loco weight: 55.00 long ton
- Tender weight: 29.20 long ton
- Fuel type: Coal
- Water cap.: 1800 + 400 gal (Side tanks)
- Boiler pressure: 160 lb/sq.in
- Cylinders: 2
- Cylinder size: 18.5 in × 26 in (470 mm × 660 mm)
Performance figures
- Tractive effort: 22,620 lbf
Career
- Operators: Ceylon Government Railway
- Numbers: 22, 185-192 (B3); 8-11, 169-171 (B3A)
- Disposition: All scrapped

== Class B4 ==
Ceylon Government Railway B4
Type and origin
- Power type: Steam
- Builder: Kitson, Neilson
- Build date: 1893-1894, 1911 (B4); 1912 (B4A)
- Total produced: 9
Specifications
- Configuration
  - Whyte: 4-6-0TT
- Gauge: 5 ft 6 in (1,676 mm)
- Driver dia.: 53.5 in (1.359 m)
- Length: 53 ft 7 in
- Axle load: 13.50 long ton
- Loco weight: 54.10 long ton
- Tender weight: 29.20 long ton
- Fuel type: Coal
- Water cap.: 1800 + 400 gal (Side tanks)
- Boiler pressure: 160 lb/sq.in
- Cylinders: 2
- Cylinder size: 18.5 in × 26 in (470 mm × 660 mm)
- Valve gear: Walschaerts, Allan
Performance figures
- Tractive effort: 22,620 lbf
Career
- Operators: Ceylon Government Railway
- Numbers: 72-75, 141/147, 142/148, 143/149 (B4); 158, 159 (B4A)
- Disposition: All scrapped

== Class B5 ==
Ceylon Government Railway B5
Type and origin
- Power type: Steam
- Builder: Kitson (B5), Vulcan (B5A)
- Build date: 1893-1894
- Total produced: 5
Specifications
- Configuration
  - Whyte: 4-6-0
- Gauge: 5 ft 6 in (1,676 mm)
- Driver dia.: 53.5 in (1.359 m)
- Length: 53 ft 7 in
- Axle load: 13.50 long ton
- Loco weight: 51.65 long ton
- Tender weight: 32.35 long ton
- Fuel type: Coal
- Water cap.: 2400 gal
- Boiler pressure: 160 lb/sq.in
- Cylinders: 2
- Cylinder size: 18.5 in × 26 in (470 mm × 660 mm)
- Valve gear: Allan valve gear with slide valves
Performance figures
- Tractive effort: 22,620 lbf
Career
- Operators: Ceylon Government Railway
- Numbers: 76-78 (B5); 79, 80 (B5A)
- Disposition: All scrapped

== Class B6 ==
Ceylon Government Railway B6
Type and origin
- Power type: Steam
- Builder: Kitson, Vulcan
- Build date: 1883-1885, 1891
- Total produced: 14
Specifications
- Configuration
  - Whyte: 4-6-0TT
- Gauge: 5 ft 6 in (1,676 mm)
- Driver dia.: 53.5 in (1.359 m)
- Length: 53 ft 7 in
- Axle load: 13.40 long ton
- Loco weight: 51.05 long ton
- Tender weight: 29.15 long ton
- Fuel type: Coal
- Water cap.: 1800 + 600 gal (Side tanks)
- Boiler pressure: 160 lb/sq.in
- Cylinders: 2
- Cylinder size: 18.5 in × 26 in (470 mm × 660 mm)
- Valve gear: Allan with Slide Valves
Performance figures
- Tractive effort: 22,620 lbf
Career
- Operators: Ceylon Government Railway
- Numbers: 49-62
- Disposition: All scrapped

These were the first 4-6-0 locomotives to operate in Ceylon. They had a unique combination of both tenders and side tanks, although the side tanks were mainly to increase the adhesive weight over the driving wheels.

The main line of the Ceylon government railways starts at Colombo and originally terminated at Nanu Oya station. Beyond Nawalapitiya the line climbs at a constant 1 in 44 gradient all the way to Nanu Oya. This would have been beyond the capacity of the 4-4-0s then in service at the time the main line was extended above Nawalapitiya. Thus these new 4-6-0TT locomotives were known as the Nanu Oya Class after the route on which they were intended to operate.

== Gallery ==
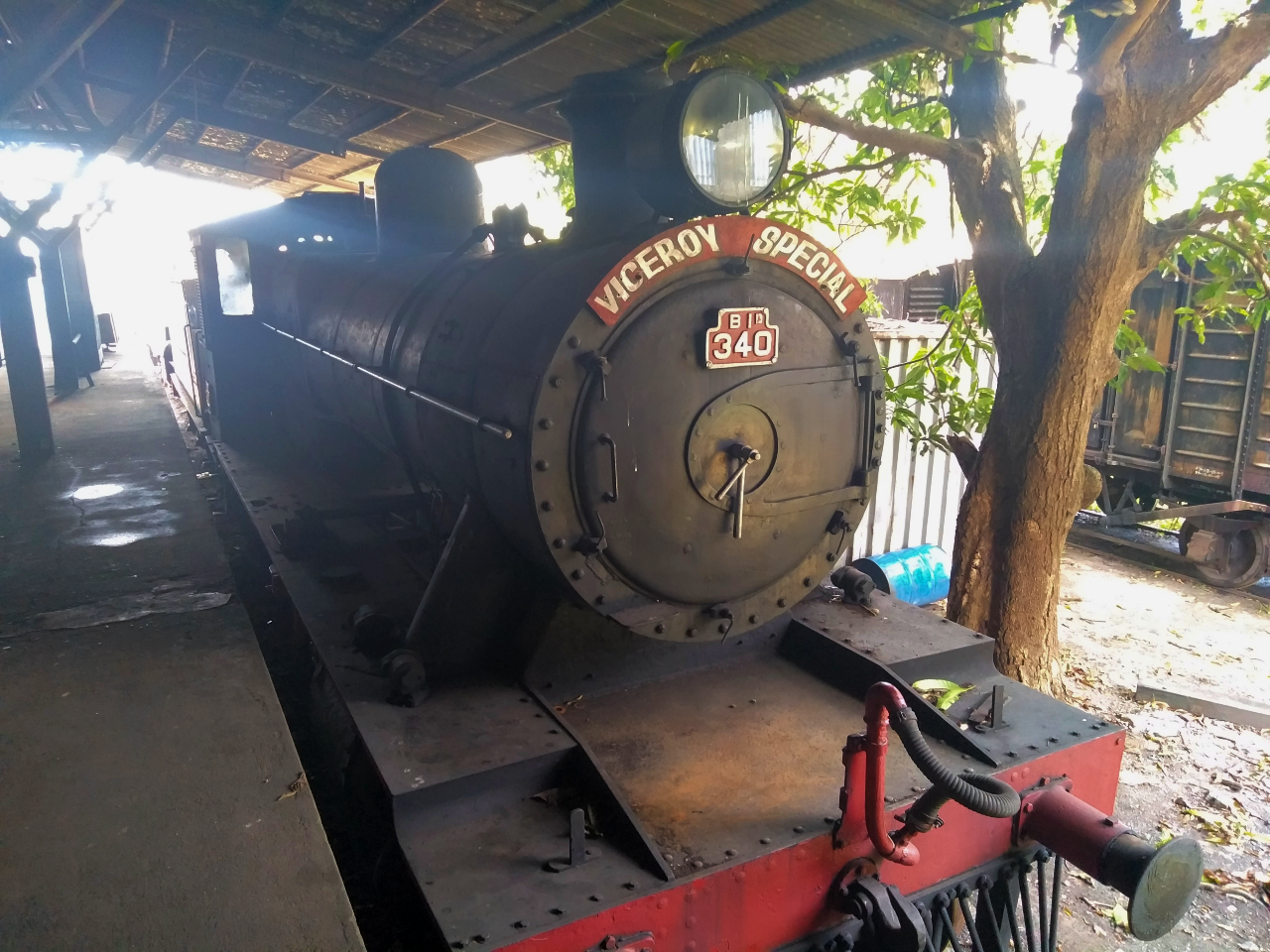

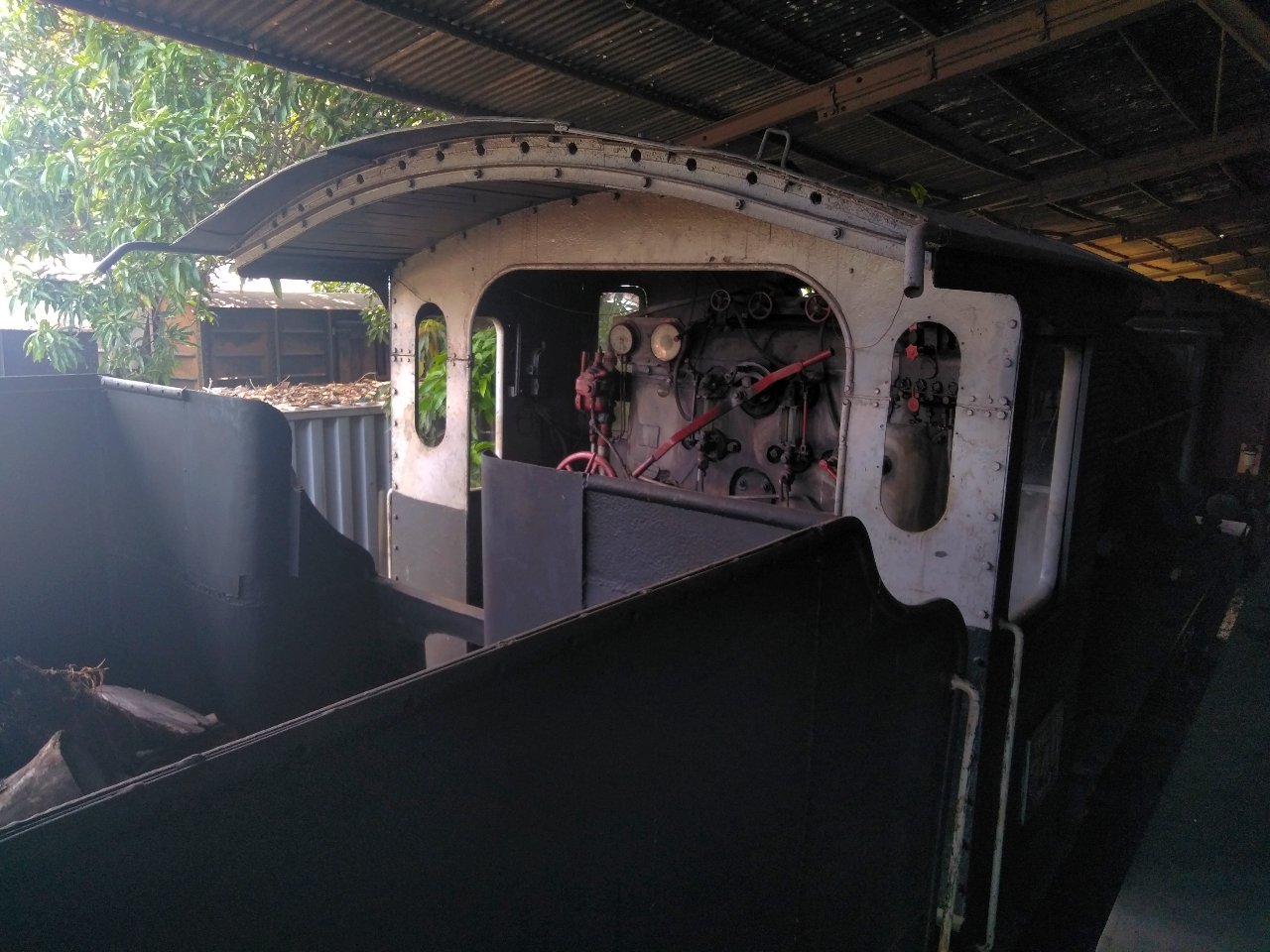
