= Sri Lanka Railways S5 =

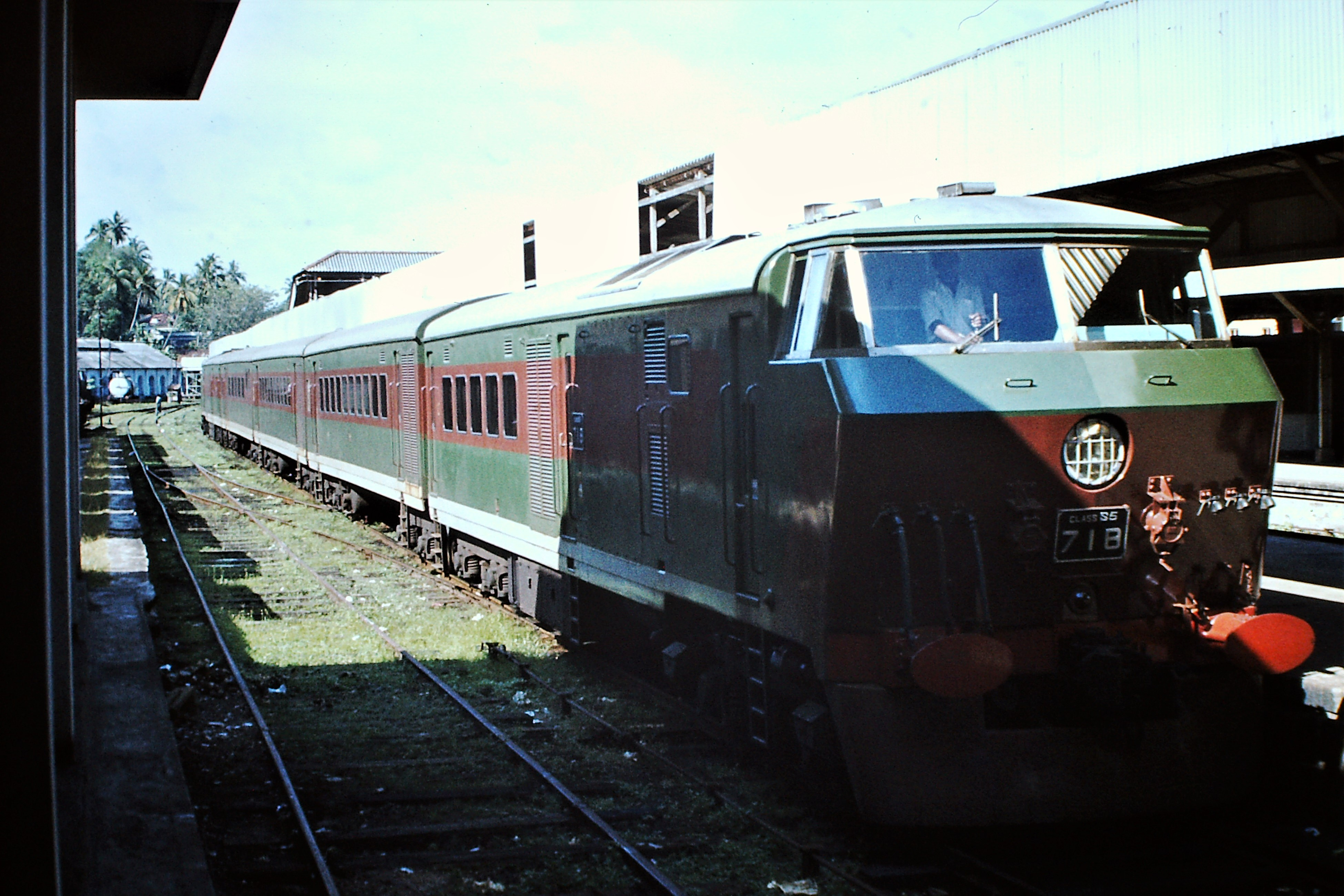
- Class S5 No. 718 (December 1980)
- Stock type: Diesel Multiple Unit
- In service: 1969-present
- Manufacturer: Hitachi
- Order no.: 2
- Constructed: 1969
- Number built: 2
- Formation: 2 engine compartments + 3 passenger cars
- Fleet numbers: 717-720
- Capacity: 100
- Operators: Sri Lanka Railways; Airport & Aviation Services Limited
- Depots: Hydraulic Locomotive Shed, Maradana

Specifications
- Car length: 16.67 m (54 ft 8 1/4 in)
- Doors: Automatic (Operated By Vacuum)
- Maximum speed: 80 km/h (50 mph)
- Weight: 63 t (62 long tons; 69 short tons) per power car
- Prime mover(s): FED/Paxman 8YJXL-V71
- Engine type: Paxman
- Power output: 900 hp (670 kW)
- Transmission: Diesel-Hydraulic
- Track gauge: 1,676 mm (5 ft 6 in)

Sri Lanka Railways S5 is a class of Diesel multiple unit (DMU) train set built by Hitachi and introduced to Sri Lanka between 1969 and 1970, only two of which were imported. The class was built with modern interior facilities aimed towards the special train tours market and is operated by Sri Lanka Railways.

== Description ==
A one-train set consists of 2 power cars (including the engine) and 3 passenger cars. Previous classes of DMUs in Sri Lanka had only one power car; with their extra capacity, Class S5s could operate on upcountry main lines. Their total passenger capacity is 100.

=== Facilities ===
The train comprises a buffet car and a kitchen; all passenger cars were air conditioned. There was also an automatic door system which was later removed. There was an interior communication system.

=== Operations ===
This class could be operated in any railway line in Sri Lanka except the Kelani Valley Line. It was only used for chartered services and has performed on the up-country line several times.

=== Incidents ===
In 1970 due to an accident, the engine of No. 720 power car was destroyed. These 717-720 train-sets were later refurbished with only one engine per train.

=== Acquisition By Airport & Aviation Services Limited ===
One S5 DMU (718-719) was chartered by Sri Lanka Airport & Aviation Services Limited and this was repainted in light blue and dark blue livery. The new painted S5's inaugural run was for IIFA Awards guests to Colombo Fort from Katunayake.

== Gallery ==
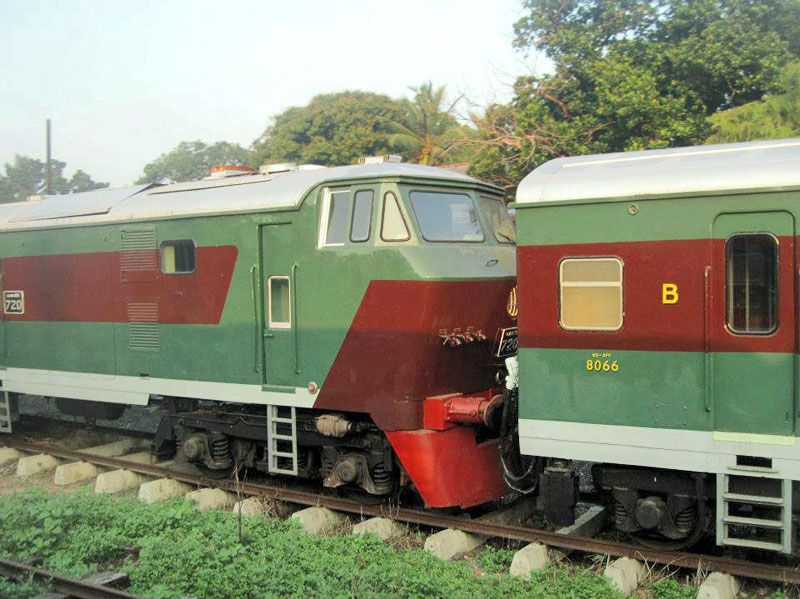
Class S5 engine 720 attached to a S5 carriage at the Hydraulic Locomotive Shed, depot for S5s

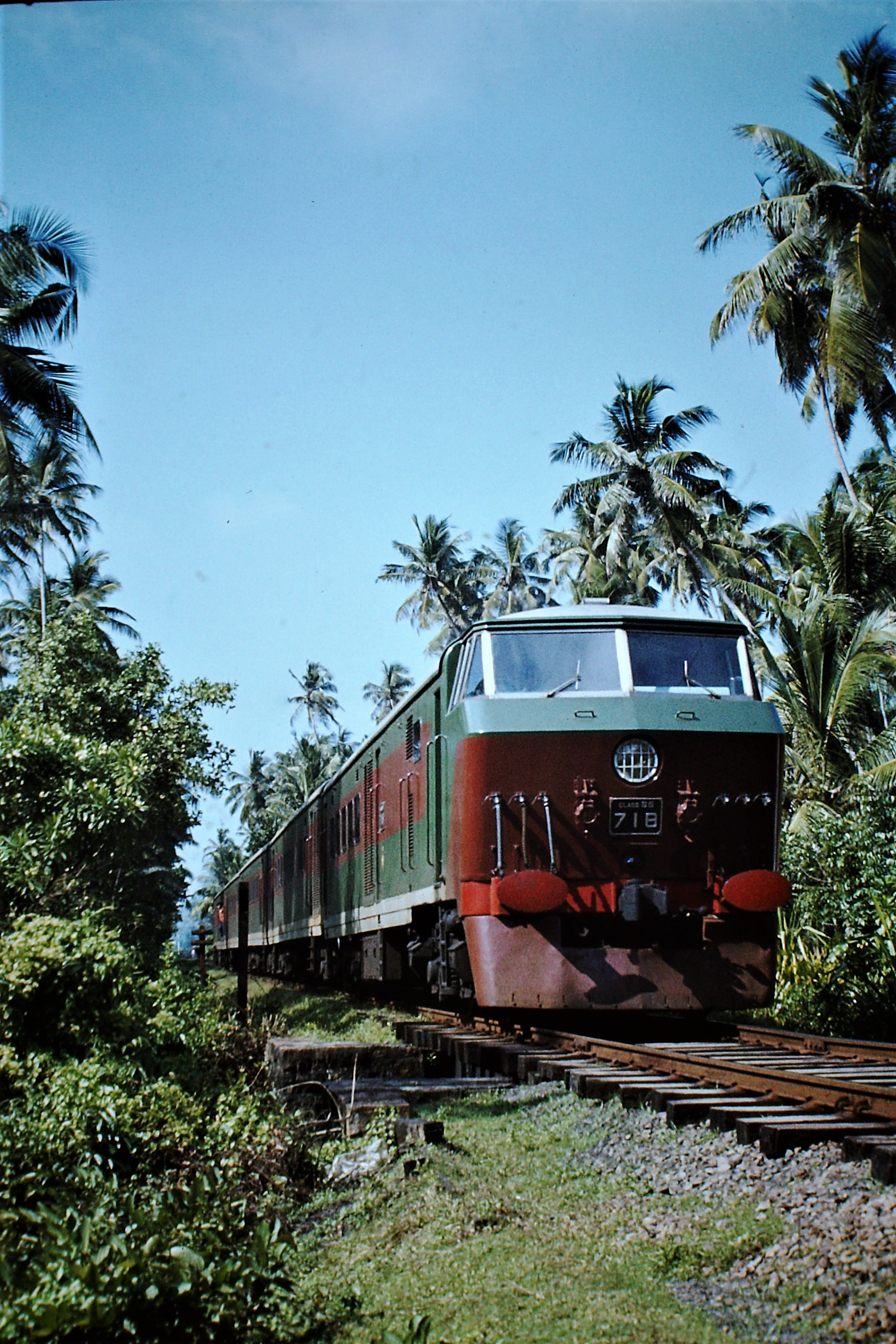
Engine 720 on the approach to Coral Gardens Halt

== See also ==
- Sri Lanka Railways
- Diesel locomotives of Sri Lanka
