= Sri Lanka Railways W2 =

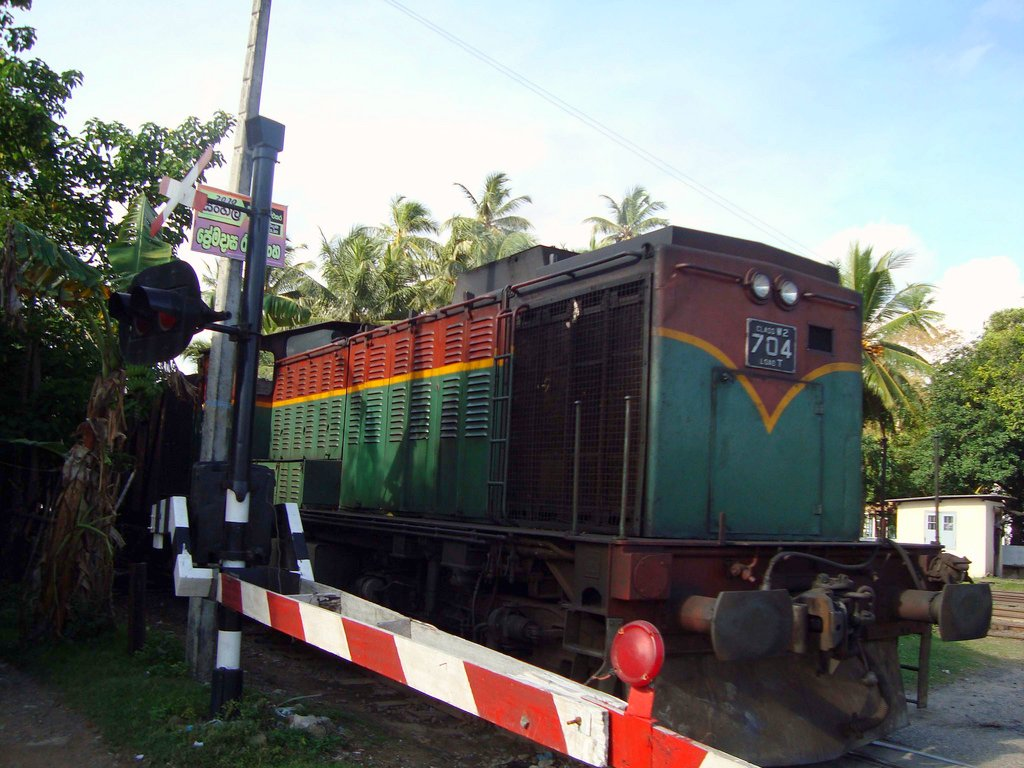
- Class W2 Locomotive
Type and origin
- Power type: Diesel
- Builder: LEW Hennigsdorf
- Total produced: 15
Specifications
- Configuration
  - AAR: B-B
  - UIC: B′B′
- Gauge: 1,676 mm (5 ft 6 in)
- Length: 13.7 m (44 ft 11 3/8 in)
- Loco weight: 65 t (64 long tons; 72 short tons)
- Prime mover: Paxman - Ventura 16YJXL
- RPM range: Max. 1500
- Engine type: V16
- Cylinders: 16
- Loco brake: Hydro-Dynamic braking
- Train brakes: Vacuum
Performance figures
- Maximum speed: 80 km/h (50 mph)
- Power output: 1,440 hp (1,070 kW)
Career
- Operators: Sri Lanka Railways
- Class: W2
- Number in class: 15
- Locale: Sri Lanka
- Delivered: 1969-1972
- Disposition: Inactive

The Sri Lanka Railways W2 is a class of diesel-hydraulic locomotives built by LEW Hennigsdorf for Sri Lanka Railways.

== Description ==
=== Introduction ===
15 Class W2 locomotives were developed by LEW Hennigsdorf including a prototype according to the order placed by Sri Lanka Railways. 14 locomotives were delivered to Sri Lanka in 1969. Prototype locomotive was kept with the builder. Later by 1972, prototype locomotive also was delivered to Sri Lanka. First locomotive fleet were allocated the numbers 703 to 716. Last locomotive delivered was given the number 729.

=== Operation ===
The class were used for working passenger and freight services on the SLR Main Line.

=== Declination ===
By 80's with the introduction of new locomotives, W2s were taken out of passenger services and were used on freight services. These have been on regular services until 1985. By 90's Most of locomotives were condemned due to technical failures. Some were scrapped.

== Class W2A ==
In 2015, SLR rebuilt W2 715. The new version has Paxman Valenta V12 prime mover. This is painted in a new livery. This locomotive is now in regular operations.

== See also ==
- Diesel locomotives of Sri Lanka
- Sri Lanka Railways W3
