= Ceylon Government Railway S1 =

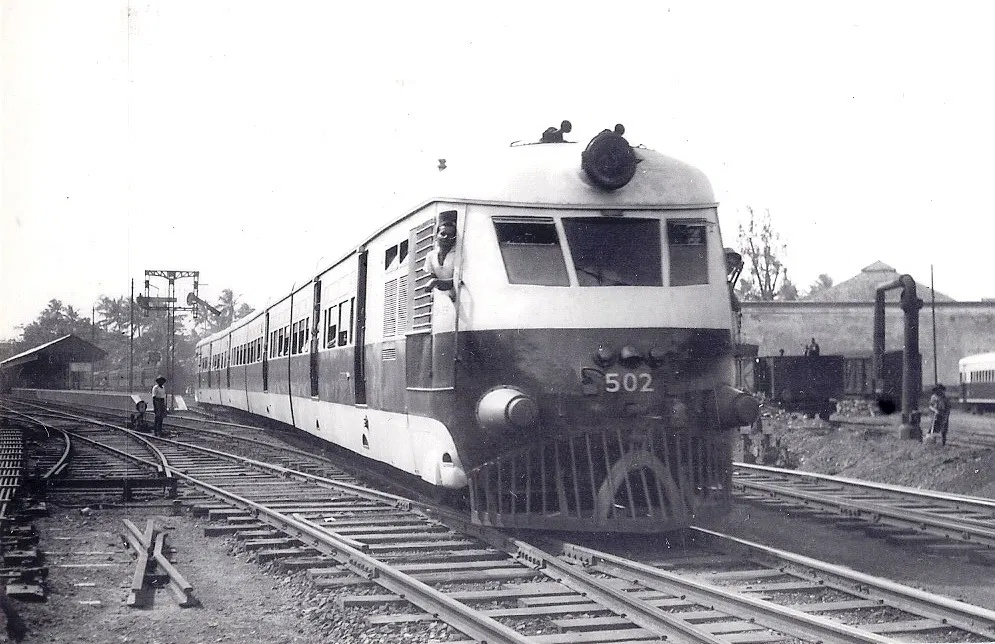
- 502 Silver Spray in 1938
- Stock type: Diesel Multiple Unit
- In service: 1936–1955
- Manufacturer: English Electric
- Built at: Preston
- Entered service: 1936
- Scrapped: 1955
- Number built: 3
- Number preserved: 0
- Number scrapped: 3
- Fleet numbers: 501-503
- Capacity: 300
- Operator: Ceylon Government Railway (now Sri Lanka Railways)
- Line served: Coastal Line

Specifications
- Train length: 206 ft 6 in (62.94 m)
- Maximum speed: 55 mph (89 km/h)
- Weight: 96.2 t (94.7 long tons; 106.0 short tons)
- Prime mover: English Electric H6 Type
- Power output: 2 x 180 hp (130 kW)
- Transmission: Diesel-electric transmission
- Electric system: No
- AAR wheel arrangement: Bo-2+Bo-2+2-Bo+2-Bo
- Braking system: Vacuum
- Track gauge: 1,676 mm (5 ft 6 in)

Ceylon Government Railway S1 was a class of Diesel multiple unit train sets built by English Electric for the Ceylon Government Railway.

== Description ==
These units arrived Ceylon (now Sri Lanka) in 1938. Only three units were ever built, and they were given the names Silver Foam (501), Silver Spray (502) and Silver Mist (503). Their inaugural run from Colombo Fort Station to Galle took place on 25 February 1938. These train sets were used only on the Coastal Line.

They served the Ceylon Government Railway for around 19 years before being withdrawn and scrapped in 1955. Later that year, two diesel locomotives classified as the Class M3 Nos. 589 and 590 were built locally using the prime movers of the scrapped S1 sets.

== See also ==
- Sri Lanka Railways
- Sri Lanka Railways M3
