= Ceylon Government Railway No. 1 Leopold =

First Sri Lankan steam locomotive

CGR No. 1 Leopold
Type and origin
- Power type: Steam
- Builder: Stephenson
- Serial number: 1263
Specifications
- Configuration
  - Whyte: 4-4-0
- Gauge: 5 ft 6 in (1,676 mm)
- Driver dia.: 61 in (1.549 m)
- Total weight: 59.00 long tons
- Water cap.: 1500 gal
- Tender cap.: 5.00 long tons
- Cylinders: 2
- Cylinder size: 16 in × 22 in (410 mm × 560 mm)
Career
- Operators: Ceylon Government Railway
- Number in class: 1
- Delivered: January 1864
- Withdrawn: 1901
- Scrapped: 1901
- Disposition: Scrapped

Ceylon Government Railway No. 1 Leopold was the first steam locomotive to run for the Ceylon Government Railway (now Sri Lanka Railways). It was designated as a part of the ML Class as per the original classification scheme of the railway, but was scrapped before the reclassification of 1937. Leopold was intended to haul trains on the Colombo-Kandy Main Line.

== History ==
Leopold was brought to Sri Lanka in January 1864 and started working on the Main Line from March 1864. On 7 December 1864, the locomotive hauled the ceremonial "First Train" of the line from Colombo Terminus to Ambepussa; Leopold, Duke of Brabant (later King Leopold II of Belgium) would be the guest of honour for the occasion and board the train from Veyangoda, and the locomotive was later named in his honour.

The locomotive would continue to serve the railway on the Main Line from Colombo to Kandy until its withdrawal and scrapping in 1901. It was replaced by a similar locomotive built by the Ceylon Government Railway itself; this new locomotive was also given the number of 1.

== See also ==
- Sri Lanka Railways
- Main Line, Sri Lanka
- 4-4-0 locomotive wheel configuration
