= Sri Lanka Railways M3 =

Railroad in Sri Lanka

Sri Lanka Railways class M3
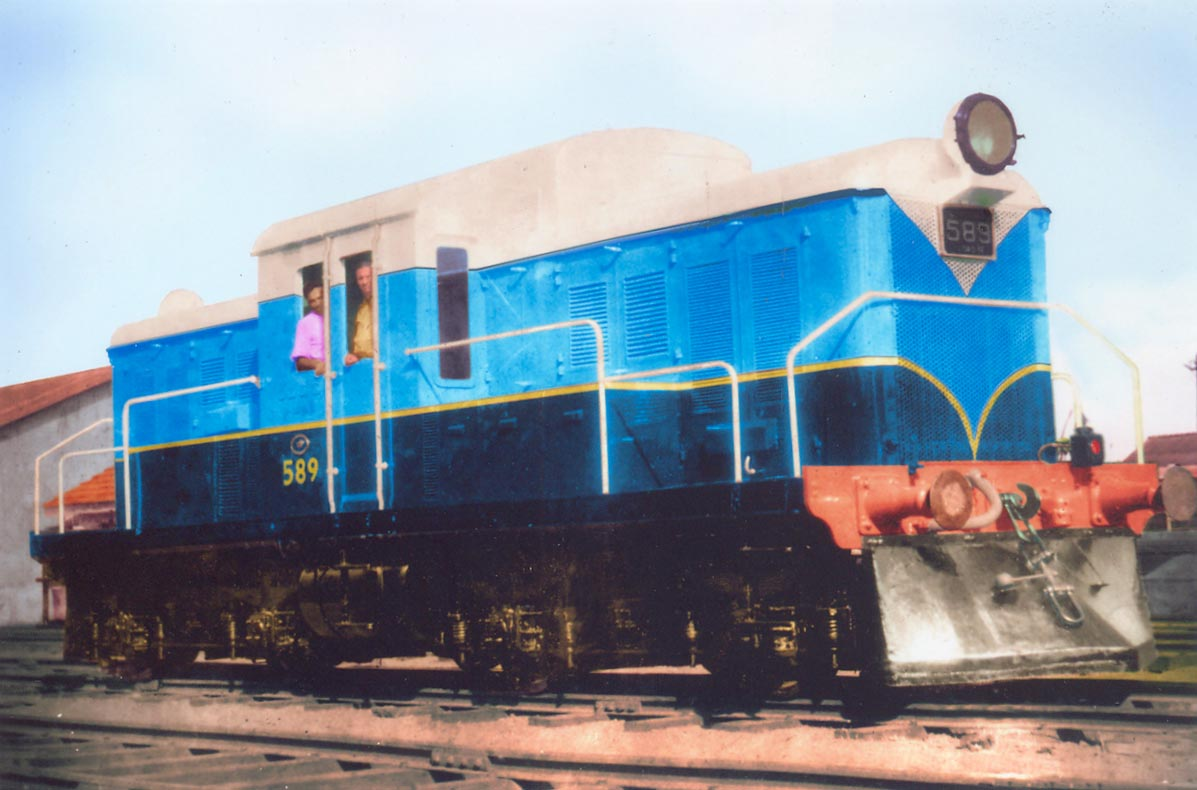
Type and origin
- Power type: Diesel-electric
- Builder: Ceylon Government Railways
- Build date: 1956
- Total produced: 2
Specifications
- Configuration
  - AAR: Bo-Bo
- Gauge: 5 ft 6 in (1,676 mm)
- Loco weight: 47 tons
- Fuel type: Diesel
- Prime mover: English Electric 2 x Willans type H6
- Engine type: 6 cylinder 4 stroke diesel
- Transmission: Diesel-electric transmission
- Loco brake: Vacuum
Performance figures
- Maximum speed: 89 km/h (55 mph)
- Power output: 2 x 180 hp (130 kW)
Career
- Operators: Ceylon Government Railway » Sri Lanka Railways
- Number in class: 2
- Numbers: 589 & 590
- Official name: Jayanthi
- Locale: Sri Lanka
- First run: 5 September 1956
- Scrapped: 2002
- Disposition: Scrapped

Sri Lanka Railways M3 was a class of diesel-electric locomotives introduced in 1955 by the Ceylon Government Railway (now Sri Lanka Railways) to be used on the Ceylon national rail network.

== History ==
In 1955, the state owned Ceylon Government Railway manufactured Sri Lanka's "first" diesel-electric locomotive using old spares from the withdrawn and scrapped Class S1 DMU power sets. This locomotive was named "Jayanthi" and classified as the Class M3 No. 589. The locomotive was put to service on 5 September 1956. Two years later in 1958, the railway manufactured another locomotive and classified it as the Class M3 No. 590.

The reconditioned Jayanthi was built at the Ratmalana Railway Workshop under the guidance of Chief Engineer Mr. Raj Gopal. The locomotive made its maiden journey on 5 September 1956. The inauguration of the train was performed by Maithreepala Senanayaka, the then Minister for Transportation.

Both locomotives were scrapped in 2002.
