= Viceroy Special =

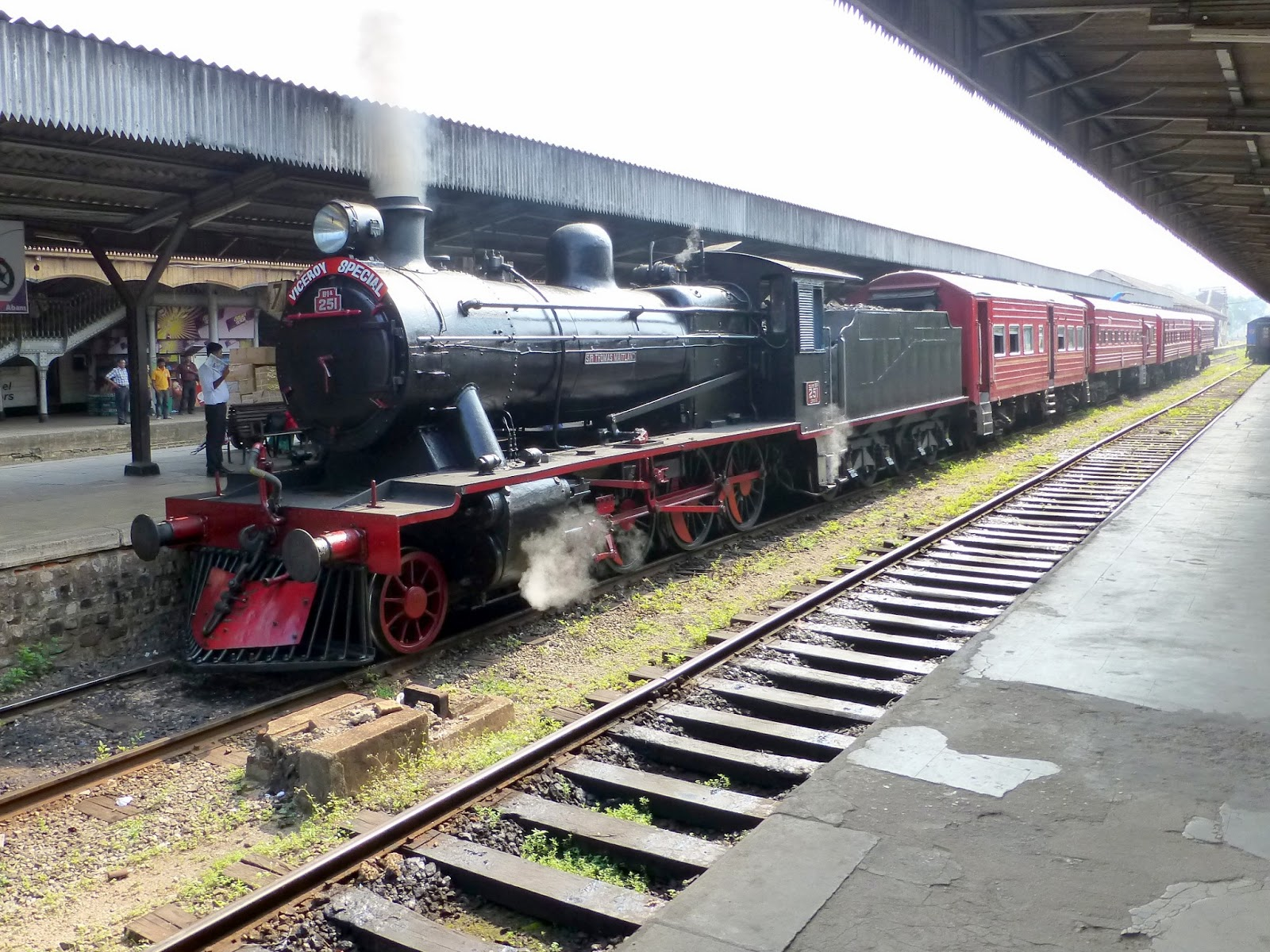
- Viceroy Special at the Fort railway station

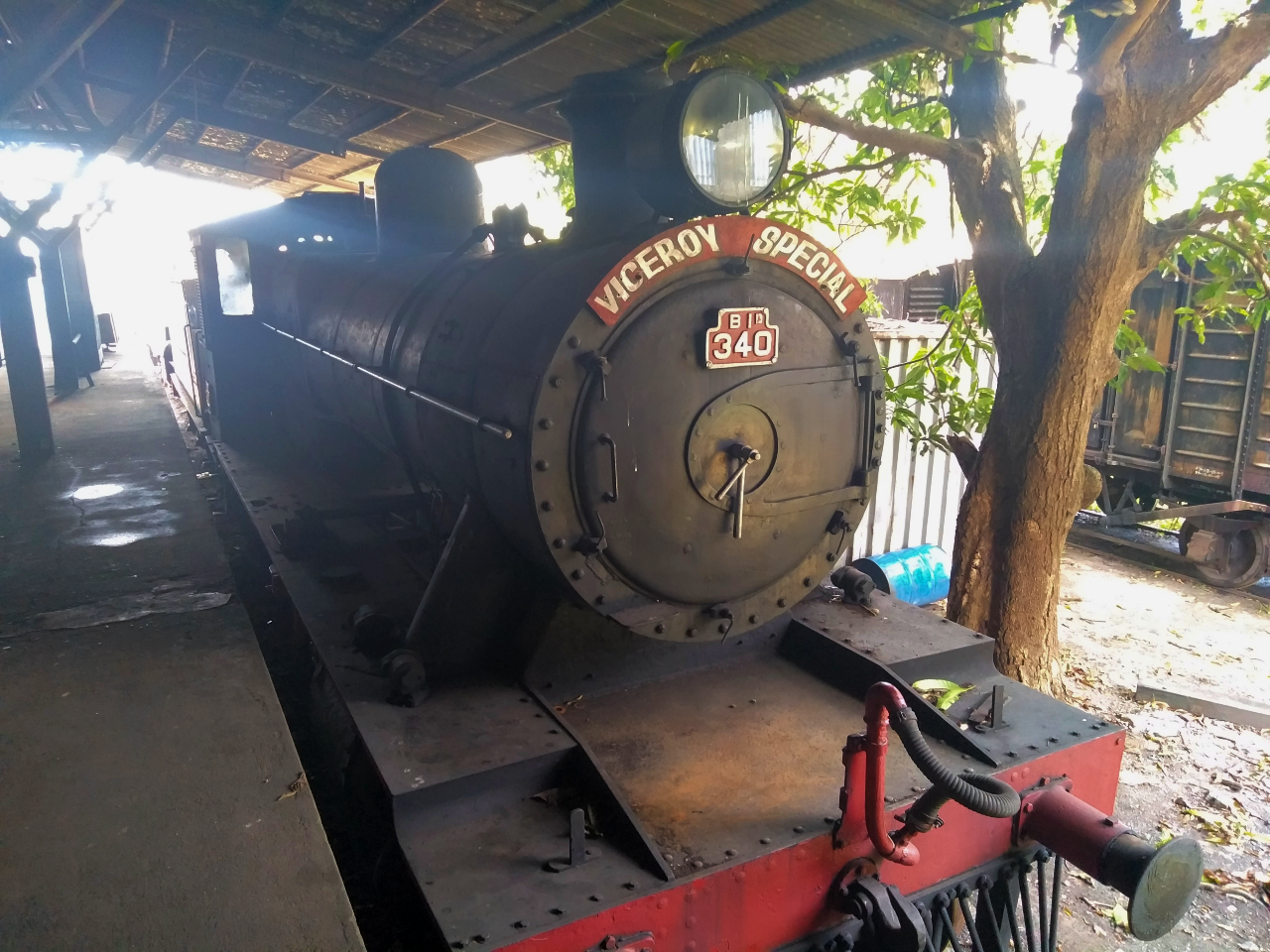

Overview
- Owner: Sri Lanka Railways
- Locale: Sri Lanka
- Transit type: inter-city rail charter
- Number of lines: 3
- Website: jftours.com/train/viceroy-special

Operation
- Began operation: 1986
- Operators: J.F. Tours & Travels (Ceylon) Ltd

Technical
- Track gauge: 5 ft 6 in (1,676 mm) broad gauge

The Viceroy Special is a special passenger train service operated by Lakindu & Thathsara (Ceylon) Ltd. Powered by the sole steam locomotive kept in operation in Sri Lanka, it is operated as a private train on all railway lines in the island. The 75-year-old luxury train has two air-conditioned observation saloons and a restaurant car.

== History ==
The launch of the Viceroy Special was spearheaded by Hemasiri Fernando and Cliff Jones. The idea of re-introducing steam to Sri Lanka rails was inspired by a tourism promotional visit to Sri Lanka in 1984 by Cliff Jones who, returning from a day trip to Kandy, called at Dematagoda loco sheds and saw, what he later described a graveyard of 'veritable massive tourism potential' and put the proposition to the then Minister of State Ananda de Tissa de Alweis who was wildly enthusiastic and with the tremendous help of GMR Manager and Hemasiri Fernando it came to fruition 2 years later. During the Second World War, Lord Louis Mountbatten, the last Viceroy of India and Supreme Commander of All Forces in the South East Asian Command (SEAC) used a special train called the SEAC Special to travel to and from his headquarters in Kandy, Sri Lanka. This train was the inspiration for the Viceroy Special.

== Features ==
The Viceroy Special acts as a heritage service. Passenger carriages on the train are fitted with nineteenth-century period fittings and include a restaurant car, an observation car and a bar. It also had some modern features like air-conditioning.

== Charters ==
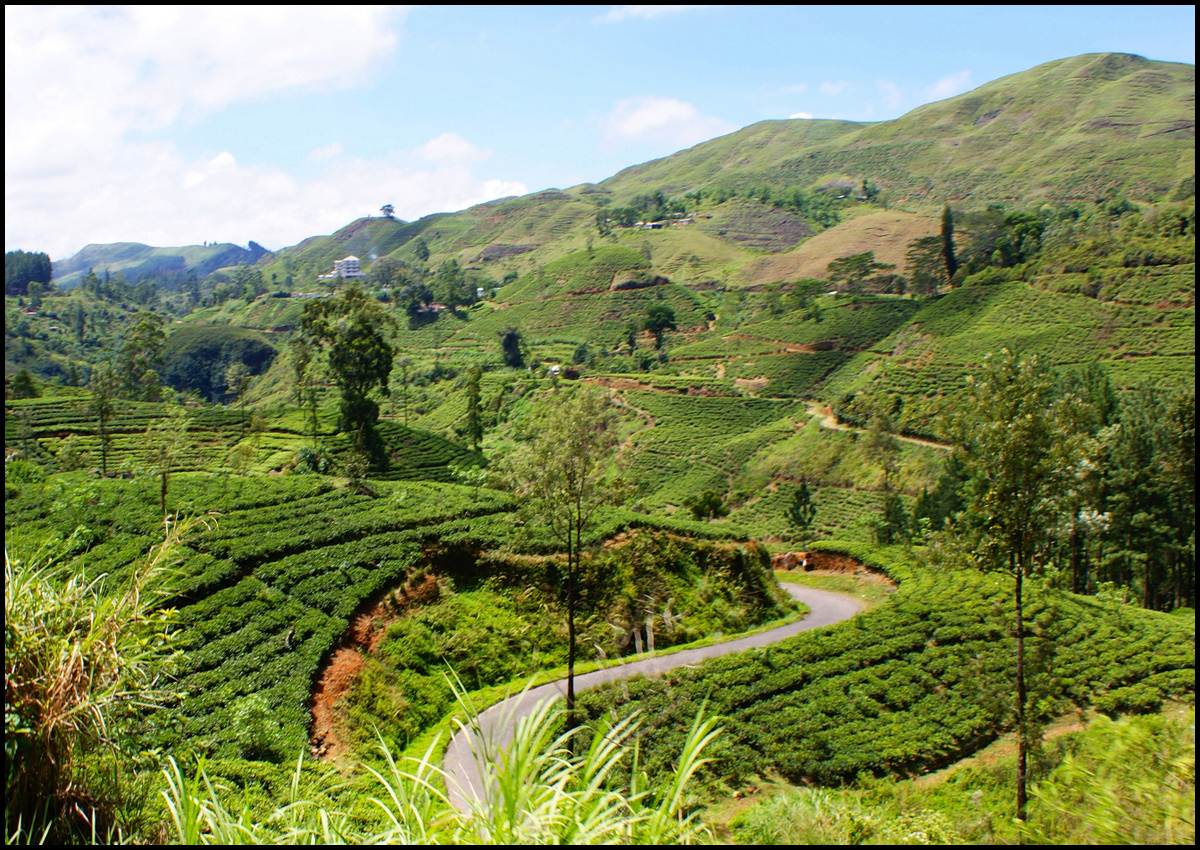
Scenery seen from hill-country Badulla-Colombo railway line

Charter Name	Route Description
Hill Country Odyssey	Colombo to Nanu Oya
Sense of Heritage	Colombo to Kandy, with an excursion to Pinnewela
Glimpse of the Ocean	Coast line to Galle

== Rolling stock ==
Three steam locomotives ran the Viceroy Special service.

- Class B1a No. 251 "Sir Thomas Maitland"
- Class B1d No. 340 "Frederick North"
- Class B2b No. 213

== See also ==
- List of named passenger trains of Sri Lanka
