= Colombo–Badulla Night Mail =

Passenger and mail train in Sri Lanka

Colombo - Badulla Night Mail Train
Overview
- Service type: Night mail train
- Status: In service
- Locale: Sri Lanka
- Current operator: Sri Lanka Railways
- Former operator: Ceylon Government Railway

Route
- Termini: Colombo Fort railway station
- Stops: Badulla railway station
- Distance travelled: 292.4 km (181.7 mi)
- Average journey time: 8 - 10 hours
- Service frequency: Daily
- Train numbers: 1045 (Colombo Fort - Badulla); 1046 (Badulla - Colombo Fort)

On-board services
- Sleeping arrangements: Available
- Observation facilities: N/A

Technical
- Track gauge: 5 ft 6 in (1,676 mm)

Colombo - Badulla Night Mail Train is a night time passenger and mail train that runs between Colombo and Badulla in Sri Lanka.

The Badulla-bound train departs from Colombo at 8:30 pm, while the Colombo-bound train leaves Badulla at 6:30 pm The trip takes about 11 hours. This timetable is occasionally disrupted by unexpected events, weather, and track conditions.

== Services ==
The train offers three classes:

- 1st class
- 2nd class
- 3rd class typically gets very crowded and carries only basic facilities.

== Route ==
Colombo - Badulla Night Mail Train travels the length of Sri Lanka Railways' Main Line through the hill country.

Colombo - Badulla Night Mail Train begins its journey at Colombo Fort Station and stops only at Ragama, Gampaha, Veyangoda. Then it comes to Polgahawela junction, where the Northern Line Branches off. Train continues its journey on Main Line. At 9:45 pm, it reaches Rambukkana railway station, where the double line railway from Colombo Fort Station ends. From Rambukkana, it has to climb a steep slope of 1:44, into the hills of the upcountry. But it is a difficult task for M6 locomotive to do alone. So M5 class locomotive is attached at the rear end, as a banking engine. With the power of 2 engines, train departs Rambukkana and continues its journey to the next stop at Kadugannawa. The rear engine is removed and the train travels to the Peradeniya junction. Rear mail carriage is removed from the train and it will be attached to a train, which goes to Kandy. The train, carrying 12 carriages departs for Badulla. The next stop is Gampola Railway Station. Again a M6 class locomotive is attached at the rear end, to climb steep slopes, from Gampola to Pattipola. In the midnight, the train comes to Nawalapitiya station, where technical officers check braking systems for safe ride through the mountains. Also engine drivers change. After leaving Nawalapitiya station, The number 1046 Badulla-Colombo Night Mail Train, which was commenced from Badulla to Colombo Fort, meets at Inguru Oya Railway Station. The Train continues its journey passing Hatton, Nanuoya, Ambewela and at 4:00 am, it reaches Pattipola, the highest altitude railway station in Sri Lanka. In here, rear locomotive is uncoupled and brought to the front end of the train and re-coupled, as a pilot engine, to begin its descend from Pattipola to Badulla. Dynamic Brakes are used for this continuous braking to reduce the wear of friction-based braking components. The train passes Ohiya, Idalgashinna, Haputale, Diyathalawa, Bandarawela, Ella, Demodara and reaches Badulla, in the morning.

== Rolling Stock ==
The service is run by M6 locomotives pulling Romanian-built ASTRA passenger coaches.

== See also ==
- Sri Lanka Railways
- List of named passenger trains of Sri Lanka
