= Demodara railway station =

Railway station in Sri Lanka

Demodara
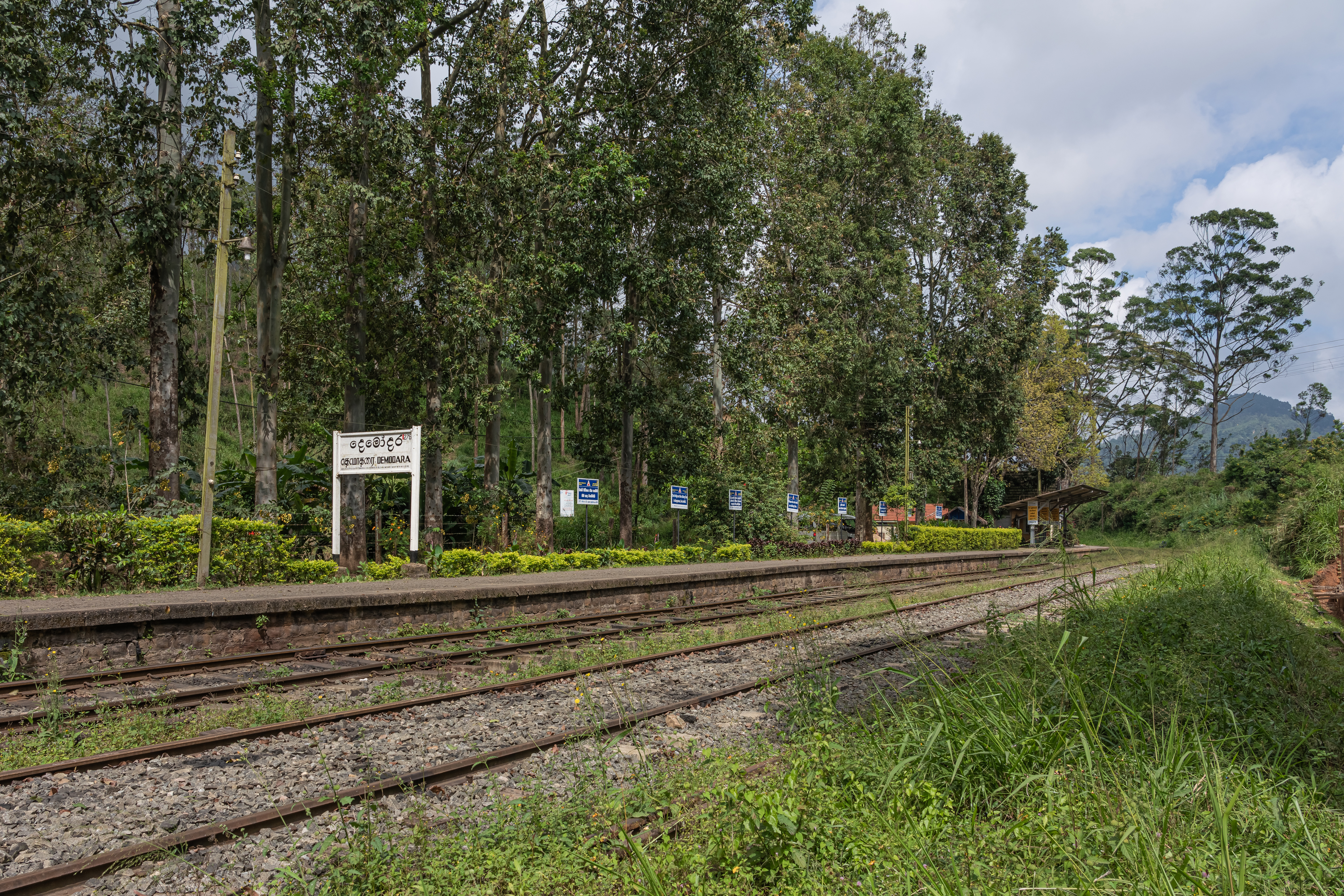

General information
- Location: Sri Lanka
- Coordinates: 6.9028736°N 81.0629186°E
- Operated by: Sri Lanka Railways
- Line(s): Main line
- Distance: 292.3 km (181.6 mi) from Colombo
- Platforms: 1 side platform

Other information
- Station code: DDR

History
- Opened: 21 March 1921

Demodara railway station is the 76th and third last railway station on the Main Line, and is 277.71 km (172.56 mi) away from Colombo. It is located 912.5 m (2,994 ft) above mean sea level and 8 km (5.0 mi) from Badulla, the capital city of Uva Province. All the trains that run on the Main Line, including the Podi Menike and Udarata Menike express trains stop at the station.

The station is most notable for its spiral rail line at this location, popularly known as the 'Demodara Loop'. The rail line passes under itself, going around the loop and emerging from a tunnel, which runs directly beneath the Demodara railway station. The rail loop is approximately 900 metres (3,000 ft) long and the tunnel is 320 m (1,050 ft) in length. It is considered the only loop in the world with a railway station situated exactly over a tunnel at spiral loop. During the construction of the rail extension to Badulla the engineers and surveyors found that elevation between the hills at Demodara was too much for the track to negotiate, with the maximum inclination allowed by the Ceylon Government Railway being one foot per 44 feet (1/44), an innovative track design had to be devised. Local folklore has it that one of the engineers, Devapura Jayasena Wimalasurendra, was inspired after observing a Kankany (supervisor) in a local tea estate undo his talappawa (turban) and re-tie it around his head.

== Continuity ==
| Preceding station | Sri Lanka Railways | Following station |
|---|---|---|
| Uduwara | Main Line | Ella |

== See also ==
- Nine Arch Bridge
