= Sri Lanka Railways M6 =

Class of Diesel-electric locomotives operating in Sri Lanka

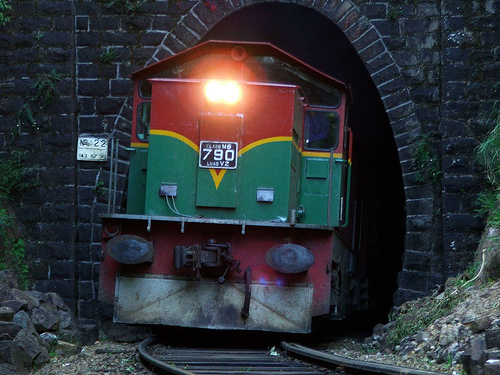
- Sri Lanka Railways Class M6 number 790 locomotive
Type and origin
- Power type: Diesel-electric
- Builder: Thyssen-Henschel under licence from Electro-Motive Division
- Serial number: 32337–32352
- Model: EMD G22CW
- Total produced: 16
Specifications
- Configuration
  - UIC: A1A-A1A
- Gauge: 5 ft 6 in (1,676 mm)
- Wheel diameter: 1,016 mm (40 in)
- Trailing dia.: 838 mm (33 in)
- Length: 54 ft 6 in (16.61 m)
- Width: 3,090 mm (10 ft 1 5/8 in)
- Height: 4,113 mm (13 ft 5 7/8 in)
- Axle load: 16.7 t (16.4 long tons; 18.4 short tons)
- Loco weight: 87 t (86 long tons; 96 short tons)
- Fuel type: Diesel
- Prime mover: EMD 645E
- Engine type: V12 Two-stroke diesel
- Cylinders: 12
- Loco brake: Vacuum, Dynamic
Performance figures
- Maximum speed: 96.6 km/h (60.0 mph)
- Power output: 1,650 hp (1,230 kW)
- Tractive effort: 193 kN (43,000 lb_{f})
Career
- Operators: Sri Lanka Railways
- Numbers: 783 - 798
- First run: 1979 september
- Disposition: In active service

Sri Lanka Railways M6 is a class of Diesel-electric locomotives imported to Sri Lanka in 1979. Most of these locomotives are still in active service with Sri Lanka Railways, the national rail operator.

== Details ==
=== History ===
The M6 locomotives were manufactured by Thyssen-Henschel in Kassel, West Germany, under licence from Electro-Motive Division of the United States. These locomotives were originally imported for use on flat terrain, but found great success on the Main Line. These locomotives were used for operating the upcountry express trains Udarata Menike and Podi Menike until 2012, when they were succeeded by the S12 and S14 DEMUs. The M6 locomotives are currently used for the Colombo-Badulla Night Mail service and Main Line commuter trains.

=== Specifications ===
As an EMD G22M, the M6 has a V12 EMD 645 engine rated at 1,650 hp (1,230 kW). The locomotives have found success on the Main Line owing to their Flexicoil truck (bogies) and dynamic brakes.

=== Liveries ===
The M6 locomotives have two liveries:

1. The standard livery (Horizontal green, maroon and yellow stripes)
2. The class' unique ICE (InterCity Express) livery (Maroon and orange; a livery that is only painted on locomotives No. 785, 788 and 797)

== Accidents and incidents ==
- Locomotives No. 793 and No. 798 were destroyed by LTTE terrorist attacks (No. 793 was destroyed by a bomb blast between Puliyankulam-Vavuniya on March 25, 1986; No. 798 was destroyed by a bomb blast at Thambalagamuwa on December 5, 1996).
- Locomotive No. 786 was involved in the Yangalmodara level crossing accident.

== Gallery ==
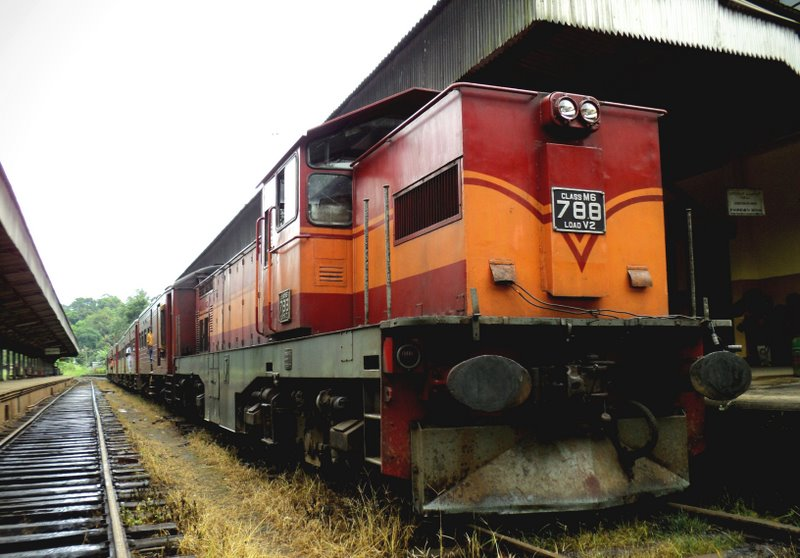

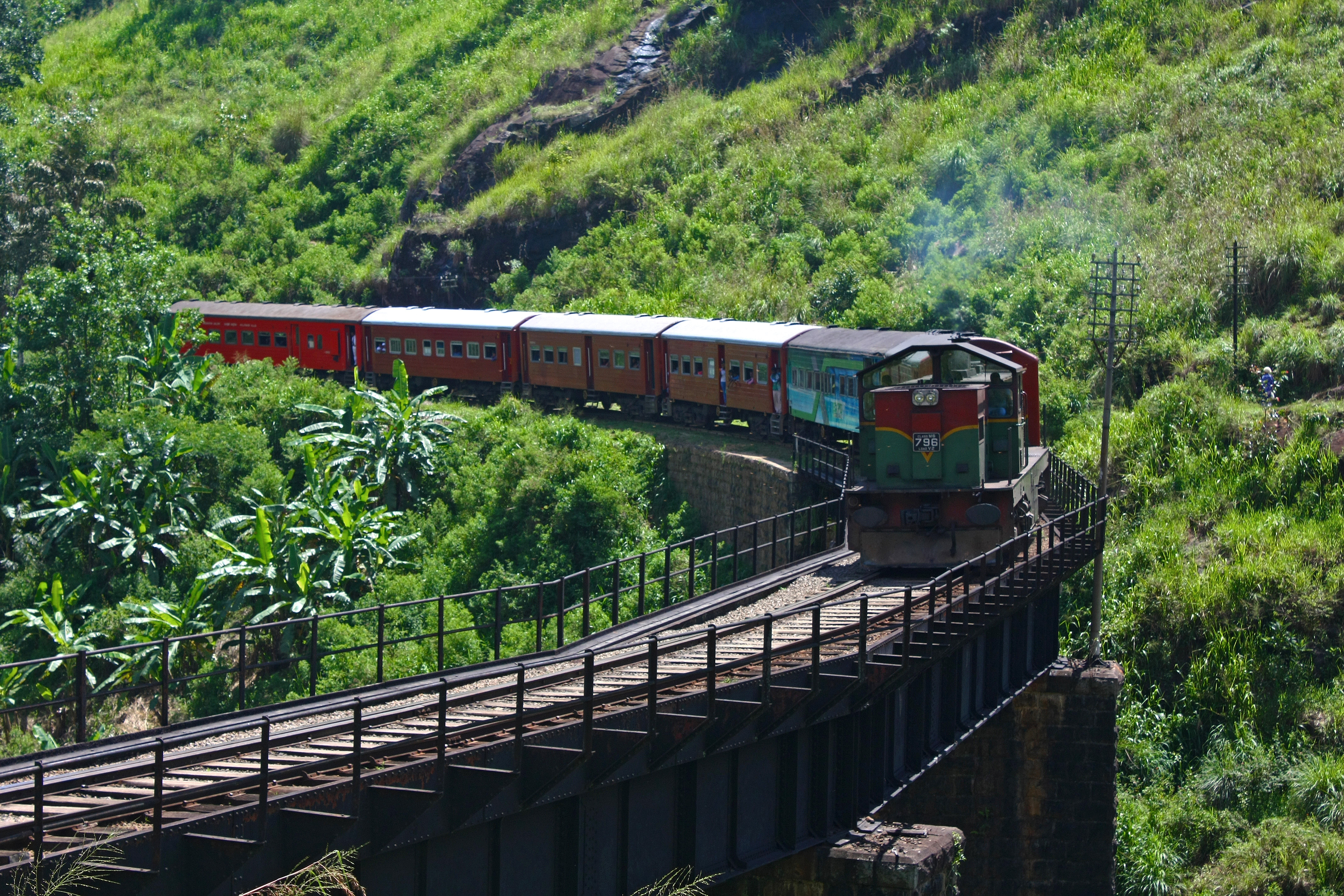

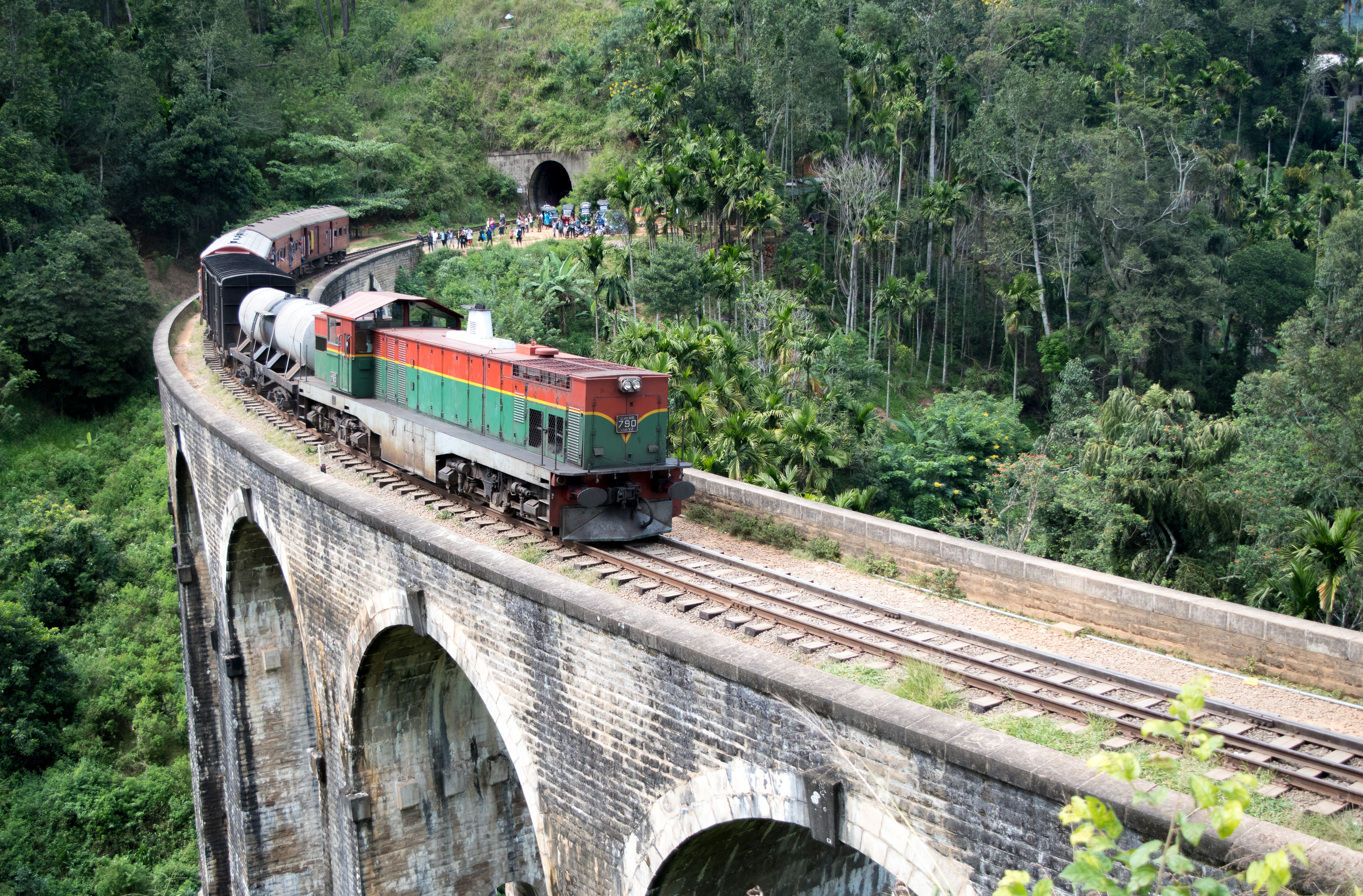

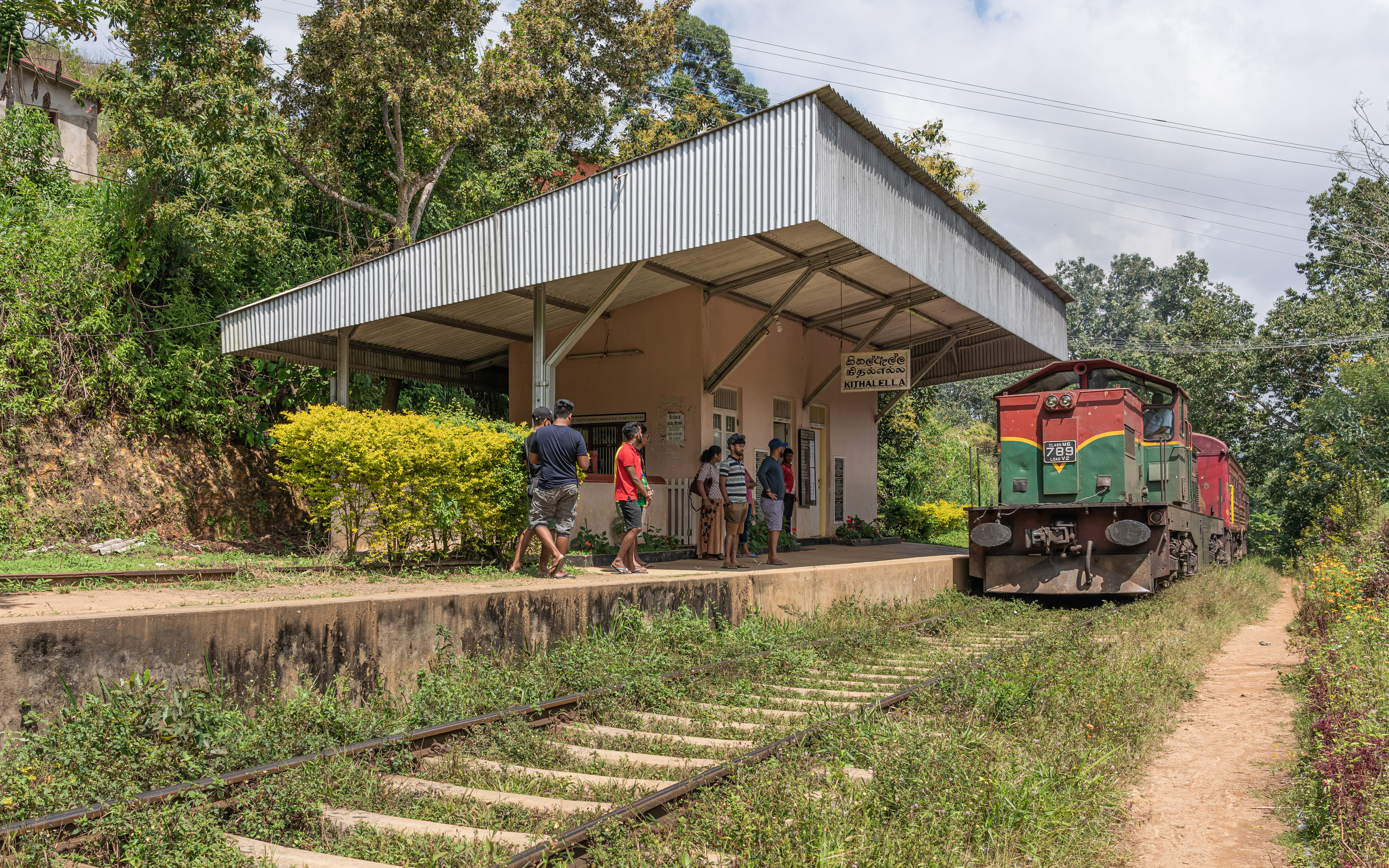

== See also ==
- Sri Lanka Railways
- Sri Lanka Railways S12
- Sri Lanka Railways S14
