= Badulla railway station =

Railway station in Sri Lanka

Badulla
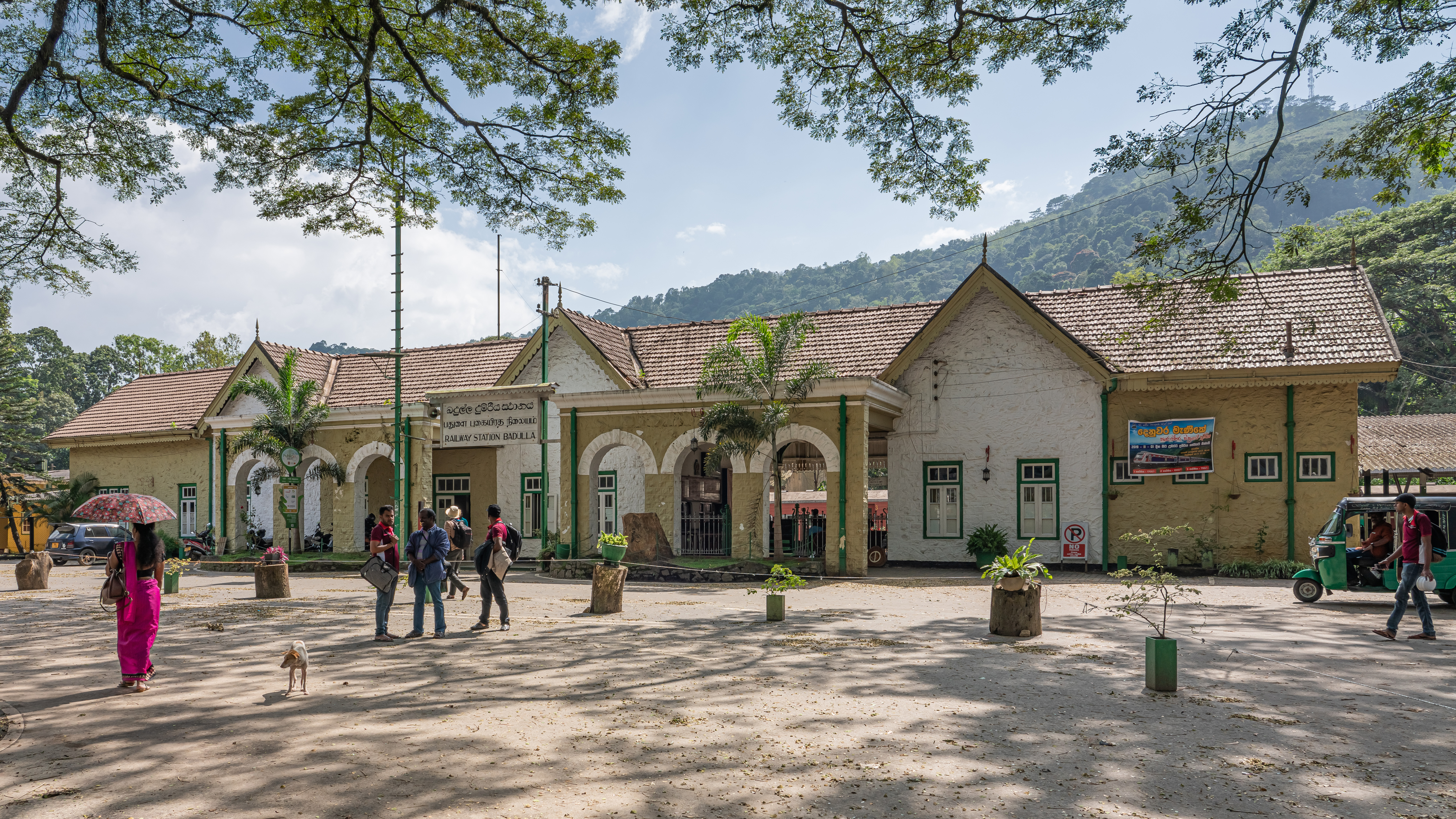
- Badulla Railway Station

General information
- Location: Badulla Railway Station, Badulla; Nawalapitiya; Sri Lanka
- Coordinates: 6.9798°N 81.0598°E
- Operated by: Sri Lanka Railways
- Line: Main line
- Distance: 292.3 km (181.6 mi) from Colombo
- Platforms: 3 side platform

Construction
- Structure type: At-grade
- Accessible: Yes

Other information
- Station code: BAD
- Fare zone: Badulla

History
- Opened: 1924
Location

Badulla railway station (බදුල්ල දුම්රිය ස්ථානය) is the last station on the Main Line, and is 292.3 km (181.6 mi) away from Colombo. It is located 652.43 m (2,140.5 ft) above mean sea level and 1 km (0.62 mi) from Badulla, the capital city of Uva Province. The trains that run on the Main Line, including the Podi Menike and Udarata Menike express trains end at the station.

The construction of the line from Nanu Oya to Badulla was completed in 1924, with the passenger traffic first commencing on 5 February 1924, although the station wasn't officially opened until 5 April 1924.This is the last station of the Upcountry Railroad. And also this station also consists of a turning table, which could turn the engines. There are about 100 men working in this station including the station masters, minor staff, and shed staff.

== Continuity ==
Preceding station	Sri Lanka Railways	Following station
Hali Ela	Main Line	Terminus
