= Pattipola railway station =

Railway station in Sri Lanka

Pattipola
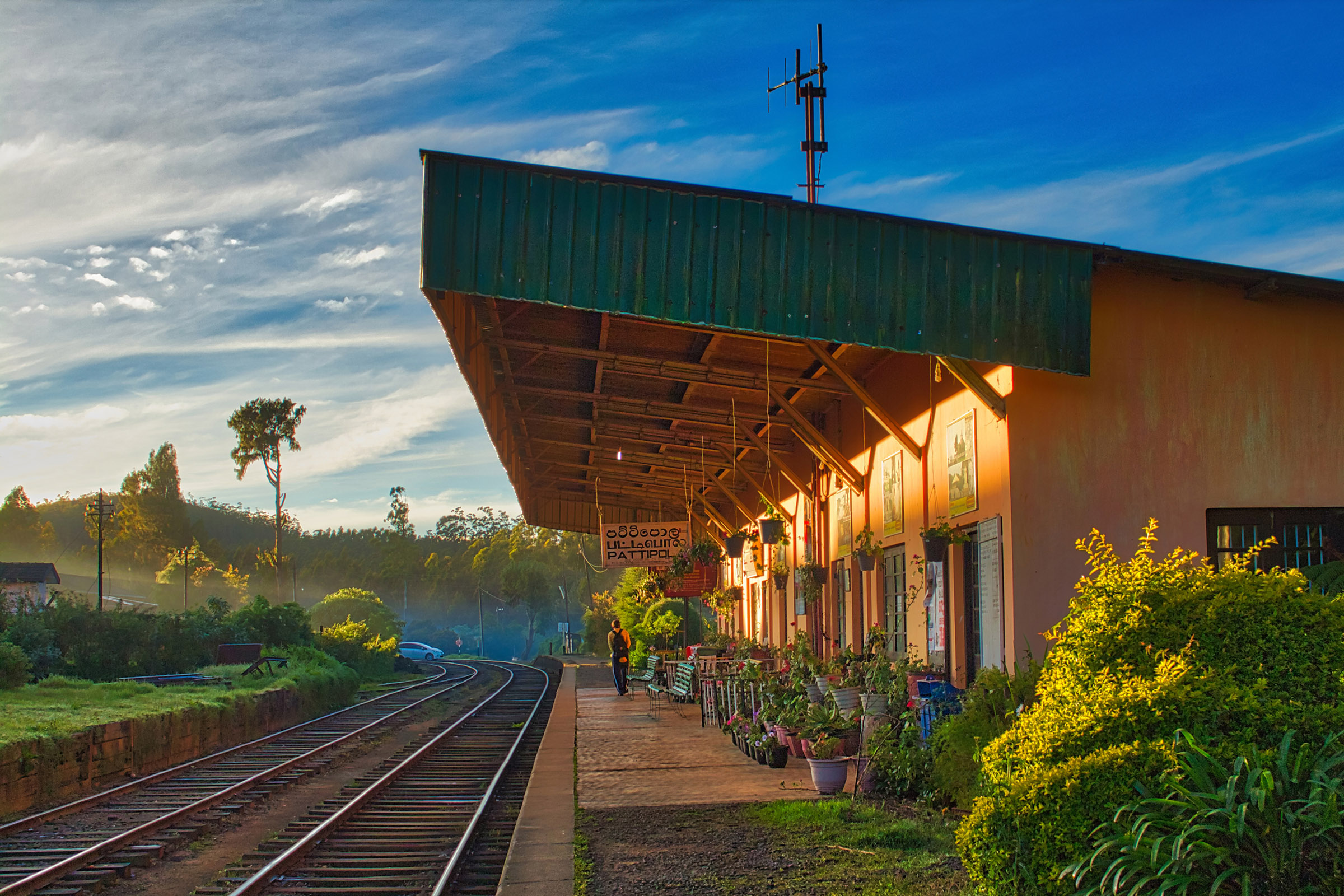
- Pattipola railway station in December 2017

General information
- Location: Sri Lanka
- Coordinates: 6.8559°N 80.8306°E
- Operated by: Sri Lanka Railways
- Line(s): Main line
- Distance: 227 km (141.1 mi) from Colombo
- Platforms: 1 side platform

Other information
- Station code: PPL

History
- Opened: 1893

Pattipola railway station is the 66th station on the Main Line, and is 226.8 km (140.9 mi) away from Colombo. It is the highest railway station in Sri Lanka with an elevation of 1,897.5 m (6,225 ft) high above mean sea level. The station has one platform with a second track as a siding loop. All the trains that run on the Main Line, including the Podi Menike and Udarata Menike express trains stop at the station.

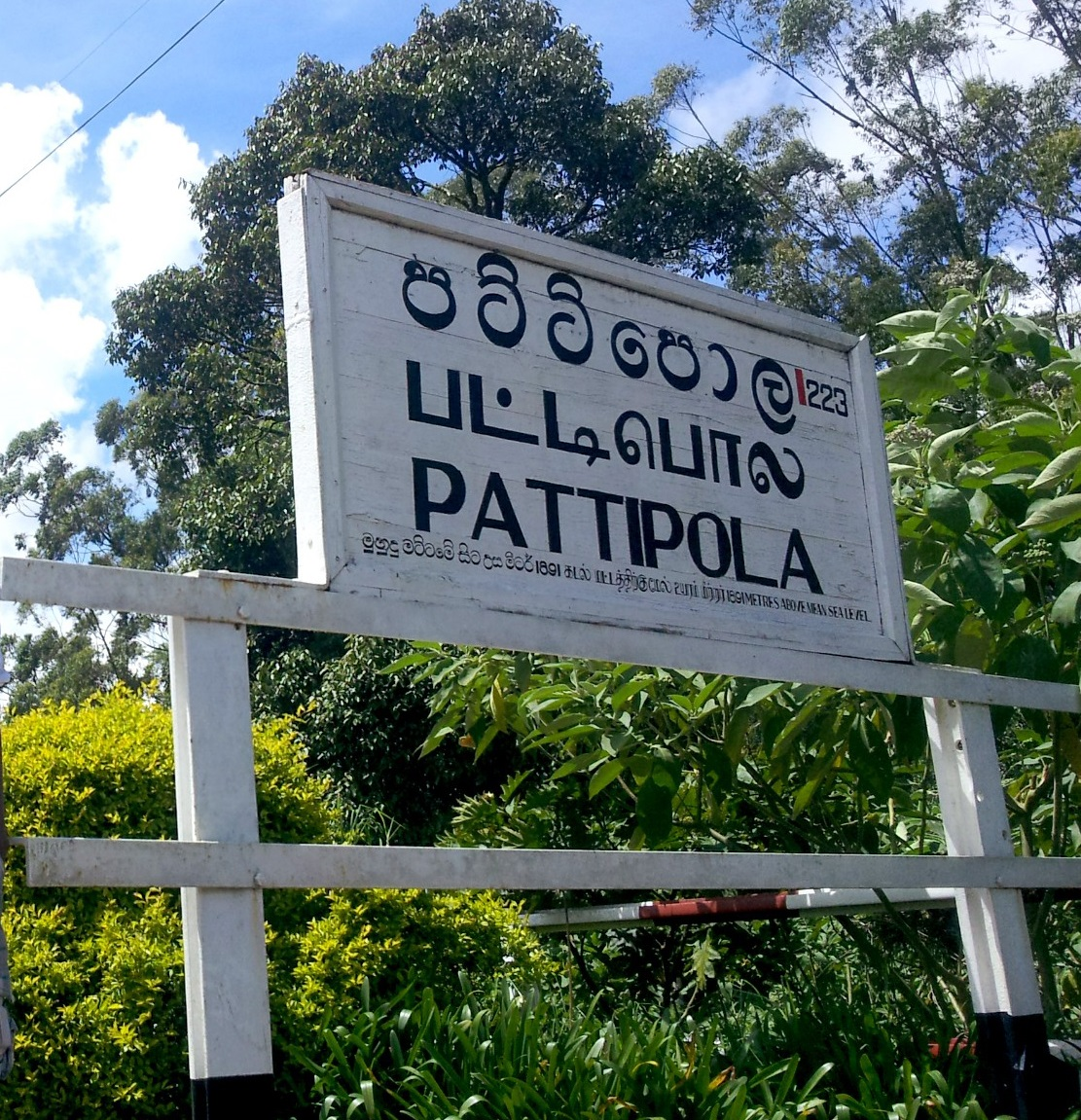
Pattipola sign at the railway station

== Continuity ==
Preceding station	Sri Lanka Railways	Following station
Ohiya	Main Line	Ambewela
