= Rambukkana railway station =

Railway station in Sri Lanka

Coordinates: 7.3213°N 80.3902°E

Rambukkana Railway Station රඹුක්කන දුම්රිය ස්ථානය ரம்புக்கனை புகையிரத நிலையம்
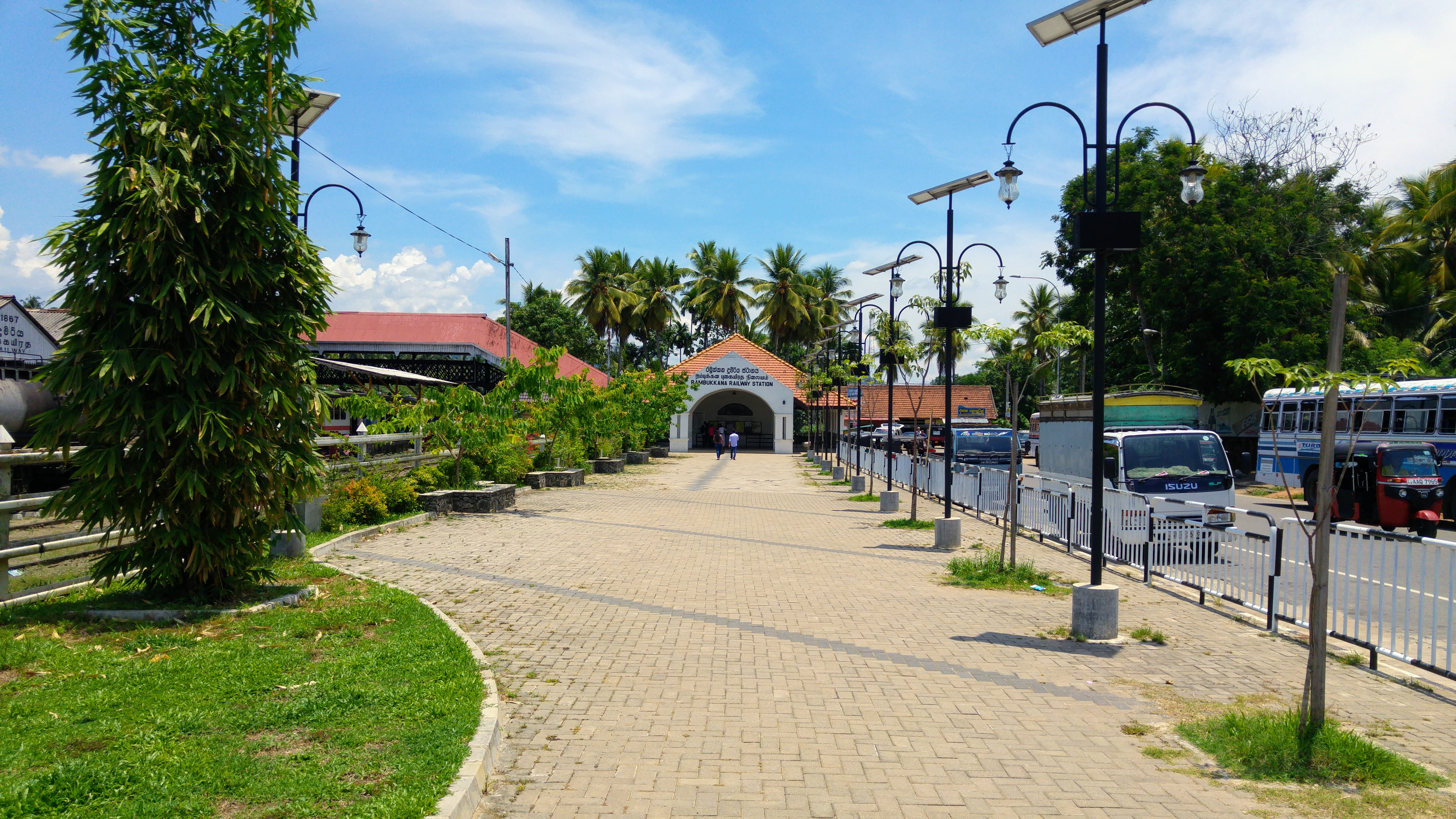
- View from Rambukkana Railway Station

General information
- Location: Railway Station Road, Rambukkana-Katupitiya Road, Rambukkana; Sri Lanka
- Owner: Sri Lanka Railways
- Line: Main Line
- Platforms: Three side platform
- Tracks: six
- Connections: Via SLTB Central Bus Stand and Private Bus Stand

Construction
- Parking: Available

Other information
- Status: functioning
- Station code: RBK

History
- Opened: 1867
Location

Rambukkana Railway Station (Sinhala: රඹුක්කන දුම්රිය ස්ථානය, Tamil: ரம்புக்கனா ரயில் நிலையம்) is a railway station in the Kegalle District, Sabaragamuwa Province, Sri Lanka. The station is served by Sri Lanka Railways, which is the state-run railway operator.

The station is located 85.14 kilometres (52.90 mi) from Colombo Fort railway station and 116.82 m (383.3 ft) above sea level. It is the start of the steepest incline along the Colombo - Kandy railway line, between Rambukkana and Kadigamuwa, a climb of 430 m (1,410 ft) over 21 km (13 mi), with the gradient reaching a 1 in 44 slope, and curves of 201 m (659 ft) in radius.

The line was originally double-tracked from Colombo to Rambukkana in 1933 however the section between Polgahawela and Rambukkana was reduced to a single track in 1940 after a bridge on the line was washed away. This section was only re-instated as double track in 1998, as a result of an increasing numbers of passengers alighting at the station to visit the nearby Pinnawala Elephant Orphanage.

== Continuity ==
Preceding station	Sri Lanka Railways	Following station
Yatagama	Rambukkana	Kadigamuwa

== See also ==
- List of railway stations in Sri Lanka
- List of railway stations in Sri Lanka by line
- Sri Lanka Railways
