= ExpoRail =

- Main route(s): Main Line
- Other route(s): Northern Line
- Parent company: Expolanka

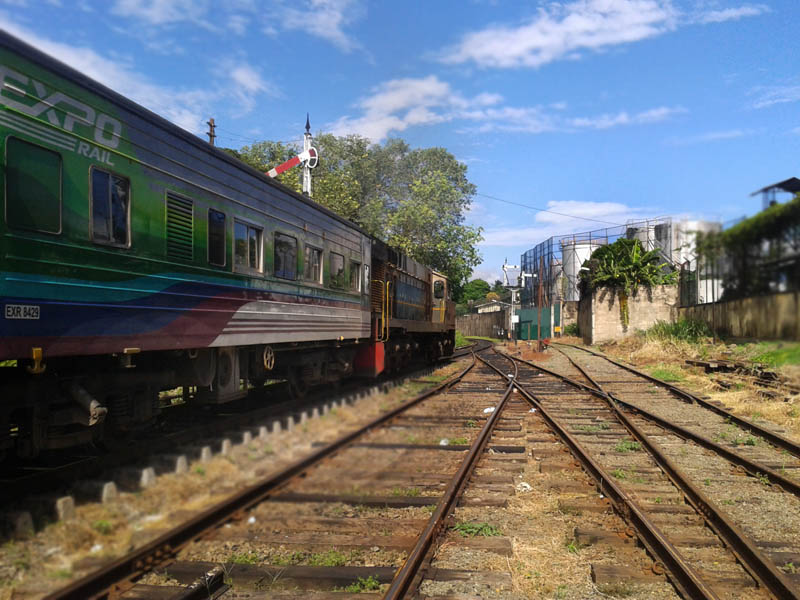
Expo Rail Carriage Attached To a Train

ExpoRail was a train service provider in Sri Lanka. ExpoRail used to provide premium services on several routes in Sri Lanka, in partnership with Sri Lanka Railways. Although it did not operate its own trains for scheduled services, it operated carriages that were attached to trains operated by Sri Lanka Railways. ExpoRail also offered charter services, where entire trains were composed of its own carriages.

In February 2012, Lanka Business Today noted that ExpoRail was the fastest growing luxury train service provider in Sri Lanka.

As of September 2017, ExpoRail is no longer operational. The official website displayed the following message: "Expo Rail operations have been cancelled until further notice due to a delay in Sri Lanka Railways finalizing the agreement & tender."

== Overview ==
Although ExpoRail carriages were attached to Sri Lanka Railways-operated trains, ExpoRail provided on-board services and marketed it as a separate operation. The service was aimed at middle and upper middle-income and tourist markets. Sri Lanka Railways generated revenue by charging ExpoRail a standard first-class fare per seat. ExpoRail charged an additional premium on its passengers to provide its services.

== History ==
ExpoRail launched its first service on a Kandy intercity train on October 1, 2011. Transport Minister Kumar Welgama and Deputy Minister Rohana Dissanayake were present at the launch. On the same day, a competing service was launched by Blue Line Company, the Rajadhani Express. On December 10, 2011, it added Badulla services and began services to Vavuniya on January 31, 2012. In ExpoRail's first year of service, 44,500 passengers had travelled on their services.

== Services ==
ExpoRail servesd four routes, on three major rail lines in Sri Lanka. Over 60 destinations were served. ExpoRail also provided charter trains.

	Route	Calling at	Frequency
Main Line	Colombo Fort to Kandy and Colombo Fort to Badulla	All Main Line stations	Daily for Kandy; Tuesday/Friday/Sunday Eastbound and Wednesday/Saturday/Monday Westbound for Badulla

	Route	Calling at	Frequency
Northern Line	Colombo Fort to Vavuniya	Colombo Fort, Kurunegala, Anuradhapura, Vavuniya	Daily

	Route	Calling at	Frequency
Eastern Lines	Colombo Fort to Trincomalee	Colombo Fort, Kurunegala, Galoya, Trincomalee	Thursday/Saturday/Sunday Eastbound; Friday/Sunday/Tuesday Westbound

== Rolling Stock ==
ExpoRail used Romanian-built ASTRA passenger coaches which are 30 years old. Imported by Sri Lanka Railways in the 1980, they were refurbished with state-of-the-art interiors in 2011–2012.

During the refurbishment, the carriages were fitted with air-conditioning, carpeting, first-class toilet facilities, Wi-Fi, LCD TVs, and side racks to store passenger luggage. Sri Lankan architectural firm KWA Architects prepared the interior designs.

=== Livery ===
Each ExpoRail carriage had a unique, brightly coloured livery. Local advertising agency, Trumps Solutions, was responsible for the livery designs.

== See also ==
- Expolanka, ExpoRail's parent company
- Rajadhani Express, ExpoRail's main competitor, serving a similar niche market
