= B. D. Rampala =

Sri Lankan mechanical engineer

B.D Rampala
- As the General Manager of CGR.
- Born: 14 November 1910; Pannipitiya, British Ceylon
- Died: 20 June 1994 (aged 83)
- Education: Kottawa Ananda Maha Vidyalaya (then Kottawa Buddhist Mix School), Nalanda College, Colombo; Ananda College, Colombo, University of Ceylon
- Occupation: Engineer
- Employer: Sri Lanka Railways
- Known for: The first Ceylonese Chief Mechanical Engineer and general manager of Sri Lanka Railways

Bamunusinghearachchige Don Rampala MBE (14 November 1910 – 20 June 1994), popularly known as B. D. Rampala, was a chief mechanical engineer and later general manager of Sri Lanka Railways. He was the first native Sri Lankan to hold the post of chief mechanical engineer. In 1956, the Institution of Locomotive Engineers in London recognised Rampala as the finest diesel engineer in Asia at the time.

== Education and training ==
Rampala was born on 14 November 1910 in Pannipitiya Rukmale. He received his education at Kottawa Ananda Maha Vidyalaya (then Kottawa Buddhist Mix School) Nalanda College Colombo & Ananda College Colombo.

After completing his engineering apprenticeship in 1934 at Colombo University College, he joined Ratmalana Railway Mechanical Engineering Department of the then Ceylon Government Railway (present Sri Lanka Railways).

== Chief mechanical engineer ==
In 1949 he was appointed as chief mechanical engineer of the Railways, the first Sri Lankan man at that post. During his time at this post, Rampala noticed many major railways around the world were upgrading from steam locomotives to diesel. He made his proposal to dieselise the Sri Lanka Railways, and in 1953, the first batch of diesel locomotives arrived from Brush Bagnall of the United Kingdom. When the locomotives started faulting, Rampala made modifications to them. When inspected by the British builders, his modifications were approved and not challenged against their original design. He submitted a paper on his observations to the Institution of Locomotive Engineers in London, which gave him full praise.

== General manager ==
Rampala was, in 1955, appointed as the general manager of the Sri Lanka Railways.

Rampala sought to upgrade the railways. In the mid-1950s, he launched express trains to shorten journey times to major destinations. Named trains, like the Yal Devi and the Udarata Menike, were launched under his leadership. When he launched the Colombo-Matara Ruhunu Kumari train service, in October 1955, it was Rampala himself who drove the train from Colombo to Matara.

Until, the 1950s, Sri Lanka Railways operated entirely with a lock and block signalling system. Rampala introduced electronic colour signalling for the busiest portions of the railways in 1959. Train movements could then be controlled by a Centralized Traffic Control panel at Maradana, greatly improving safety.

== Recognition ==
In 1956, the Institution of Locomotive Engineers in London recognised Rampala as the Best Diesel Engineer in Asia.

== Death and legacy ==
He died on 20 June 1994 at the age of 84.

In addition to improving safety on the Sri Lanka Railways, Rampala has been remembered for his mark on culture. He created the Yal Devi train to connect Colombo, the capital, and Jaffna. In doing so, he created a cultural icon that transcended any divides between north and south.
