= Rajadhani Express =

Train in Sri Lanka

Blue Line Express
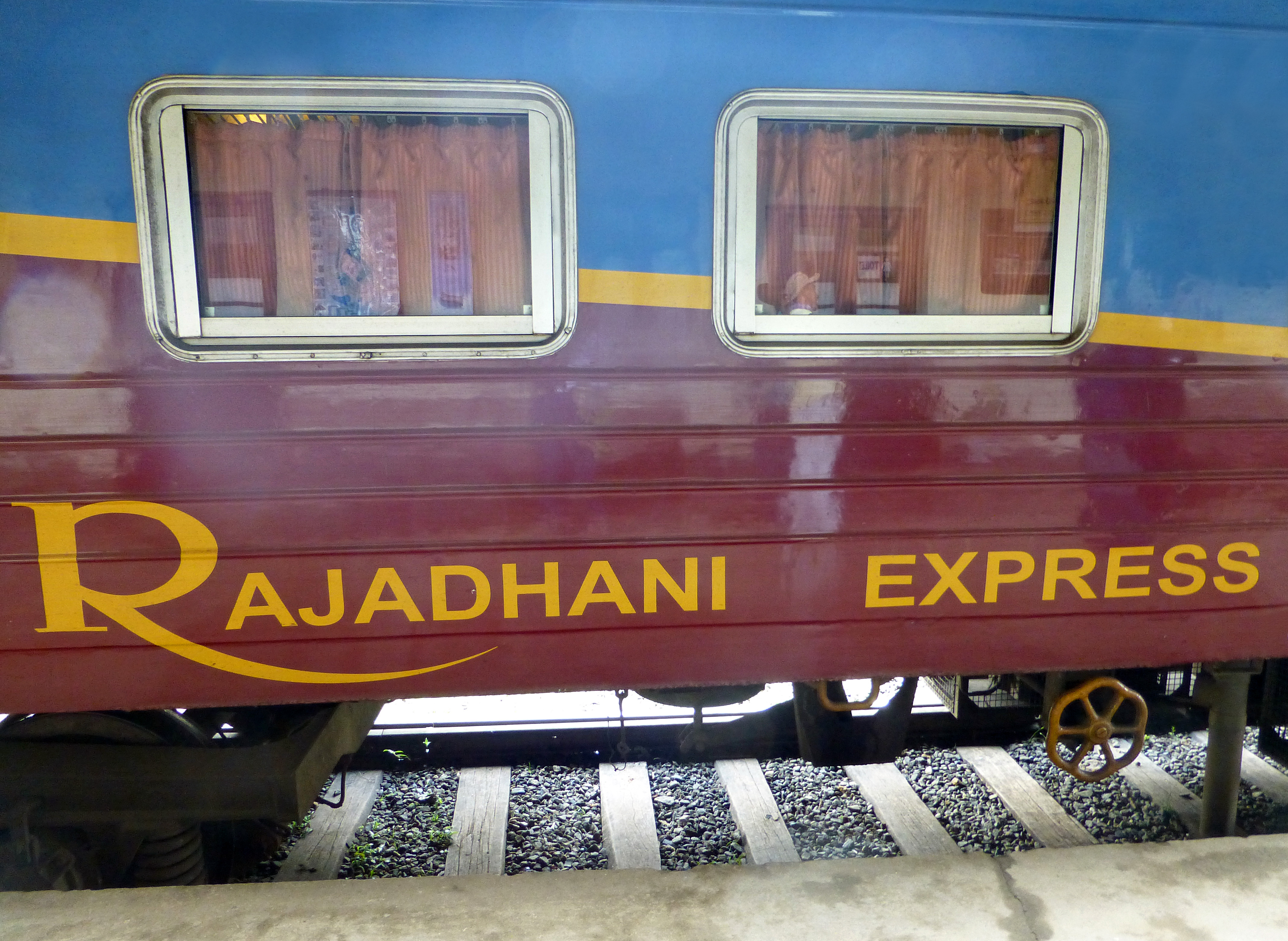
- Rajadhani Express, Sri Lanka
- Main route: Main Line
- Other route: Coastal Line
- Parent company: Blue Line Company

Blue Line Express (Sinhala: රාජධානි එක්ස්ප්‍රස් Rajadhani Ekspras) was a train service provider in Sri Lanka, a part of Blue Line Company. Blue Line Express provided premium services on several routes in Sri Lanka, in partnership with Sri Lanka Railways. This name of train is closest to the real name 'Rajdhani Express' of Indian Railways (India)

== Overview ==
Although it did not operate its own trains for scheduled services, Blue Line Express operated carriages attached to trains operated by Sri Lanka Railways. Blue Line provided on-board services and marketed it as a separate operation. The service was aimed at middle and upper middle-income and foreign tourists. Sri Lanka Railways generated revenue by charging Blue Line a standard first-class fare per seat. Blue Line charged an additional premium on its passengers beyond the standard fare to provide its services.

== History ==
The Blue Line Company launched Rajadhani Express on 1 October 2011, with its first service on a Kandy intercity train. On the same day, a competing service was launched by Expolanka, called ExpoRail. Rajadhani Express services ended on 31 March 2017. On 1 March 2019, The service started to Kandy with a new name (Blue Line Express) and updated carriages.

== Services ==
Blue Line Express served one route, on the upcountry rail line in Sri Lanka.

	Route	Calling at	Frequency
Main Line	Colombo Fort to Kandy	All Main Line stations	Daily

== Rolling stock ==
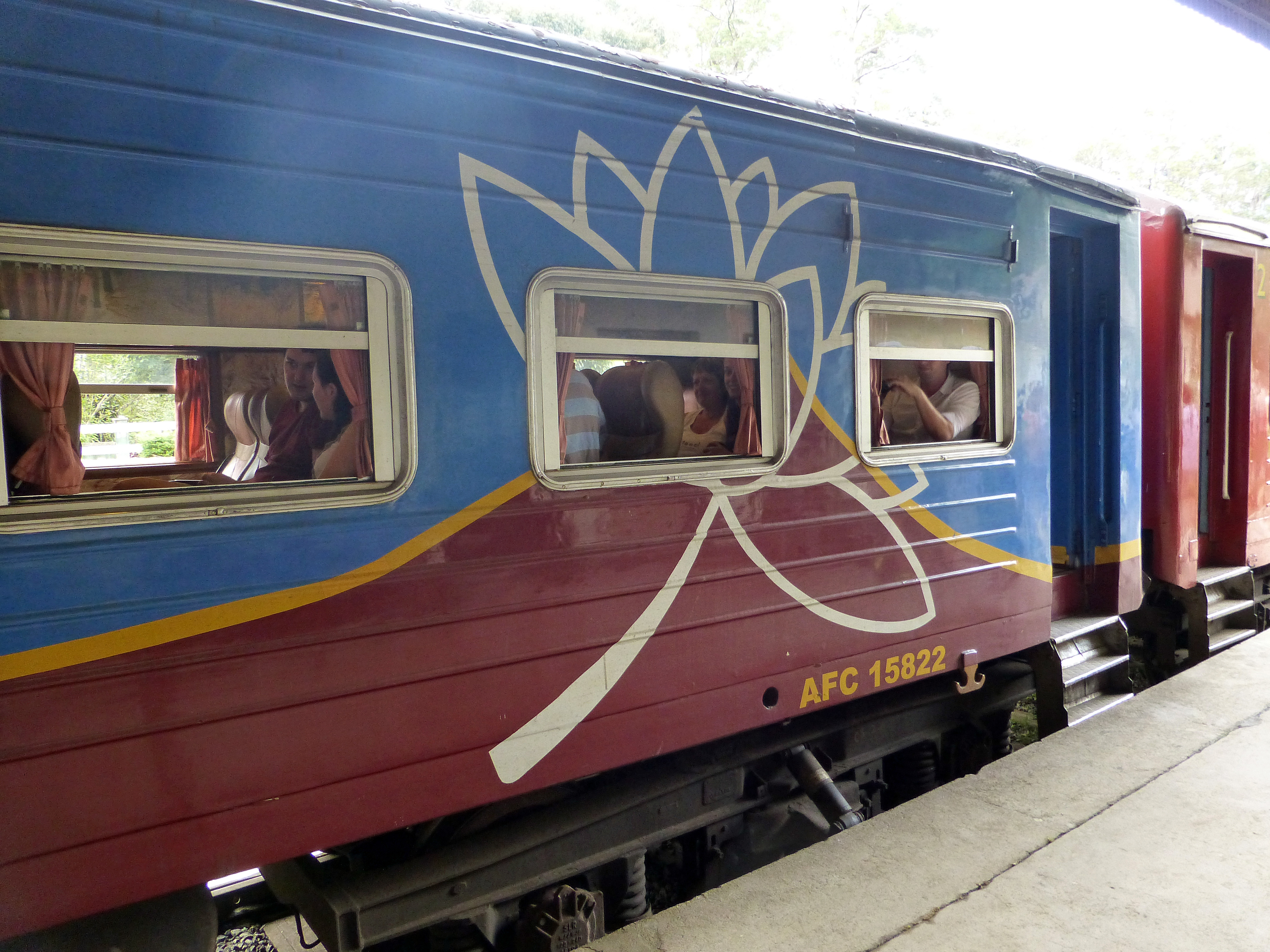
Rolling stock

Blue Line Express used Romanian-built ASTRA passenger coaches. Imported by Sri Lanka Railways in the 1990s, they were refurbished in 2011–2012 to Blue Line's specifications. They were painted gold and blue to suit the name change from "Rajadhani" to "Blue Line Express" in 2019.

== See also ==
- ExpoRail, Rajadhani's main competitor, serving a similar niche market
