= Mihintale line =

Overview
- Native name: මිහින්තලේ දුම්රිය මාර්ගය
- Status: Active
- Owner: Sri Lanka Railways
- Locale: Sri Lanka
- Termini: Mihintale Junction railway station, Anuradhapura; Mihintale railway station, Mihintale

Service
- Operator(s): Sri Lanka Railways

History
- Opened: 28 May 1993

Technical
- Line length: 11 km (6.8 mi)
- Track gauge: 5 ft 6 in (1,676 mm)

Mihintale line is a 5 ft 6 in (1,676 mm) gauge railway line in Sri Lanka which starts from Anuradhapura and ends at Mihintale, which was constructed in 1993.

The Mihintale line is approximately 11 km (6.8 mi) in length and there are no stations between the termini. The train takes about 35 minutes to complete the journey. The line branches off from northern line at the Mihintale Junction railway station in Anuradhapura.

In 1990 President Ranasinghe Premadasa first proposed to construct a railway line from Anuradhapura to Mihintale, in order to accommodate the growing demands of Buddhist pilgrims travelling to the sacred sites at Mihintale. The responsibility for the project was given to the Minister of Transport Wijayapala Mendis and the General Manager of Sri Lanka Railway, W. A. C. K. Silva. The route runs parallel to main bus route and primarily through crown land. The rail line took six months to construct at a cost of Rs. 151 million and was officially opened on 28 May 1993 by Mendis.

The line terminates at the Mihintale railway station, which has a single platform with a siding. The station has linking pavilions with shelter and toilet provisions at one end and a retiring room, which consists of ten bedrooms, at the other end.

== Operations ==
Trains are not regularly operated on this line. Trains only operate on this line during the Poson period (early June), to cater for the high demand by Buddhist pilgrims travelling between holy sites in Anuradhapura and Mihintale at this time. On Vesak (the day of the full-moon in May) free trains are operated on the line.

== See also ==
- Sri Lanka Railways
