= Udarata Menike =

Express passenger train in Sri Lanka

Udarata Menike උඩරට මැණිකේ உடரட்ட மெணிக்கே
Overview
- Service type: Express train
- Status: In service
- Locale: Sri Lanka
- First service: 23 April 1956
- Last service: present
- Current operator: Sri Lanka Railways
- Former operator: Ceylon Government Railway

Route
- Termini: Colombo Fort railway station
- Stops: Badulla railway station
- Distance travelled: 290 km (180 mi)
- Average journey time: 10–12 hours
- Service frequency: Daily
- Train numbers: 1015 (Colombo Fort-Badulla); 1016 (Badulla-Colombo Fort)

On-board services
- Sleeping arrangements: Not available
- Catering facilities: On board snack bar available in few cars, with vendors coming onboard from station platforms to sell snacks.
- Observation facilities: Not available

Technical
- Track gauge: 5 ft 6 in (1,676 mm)

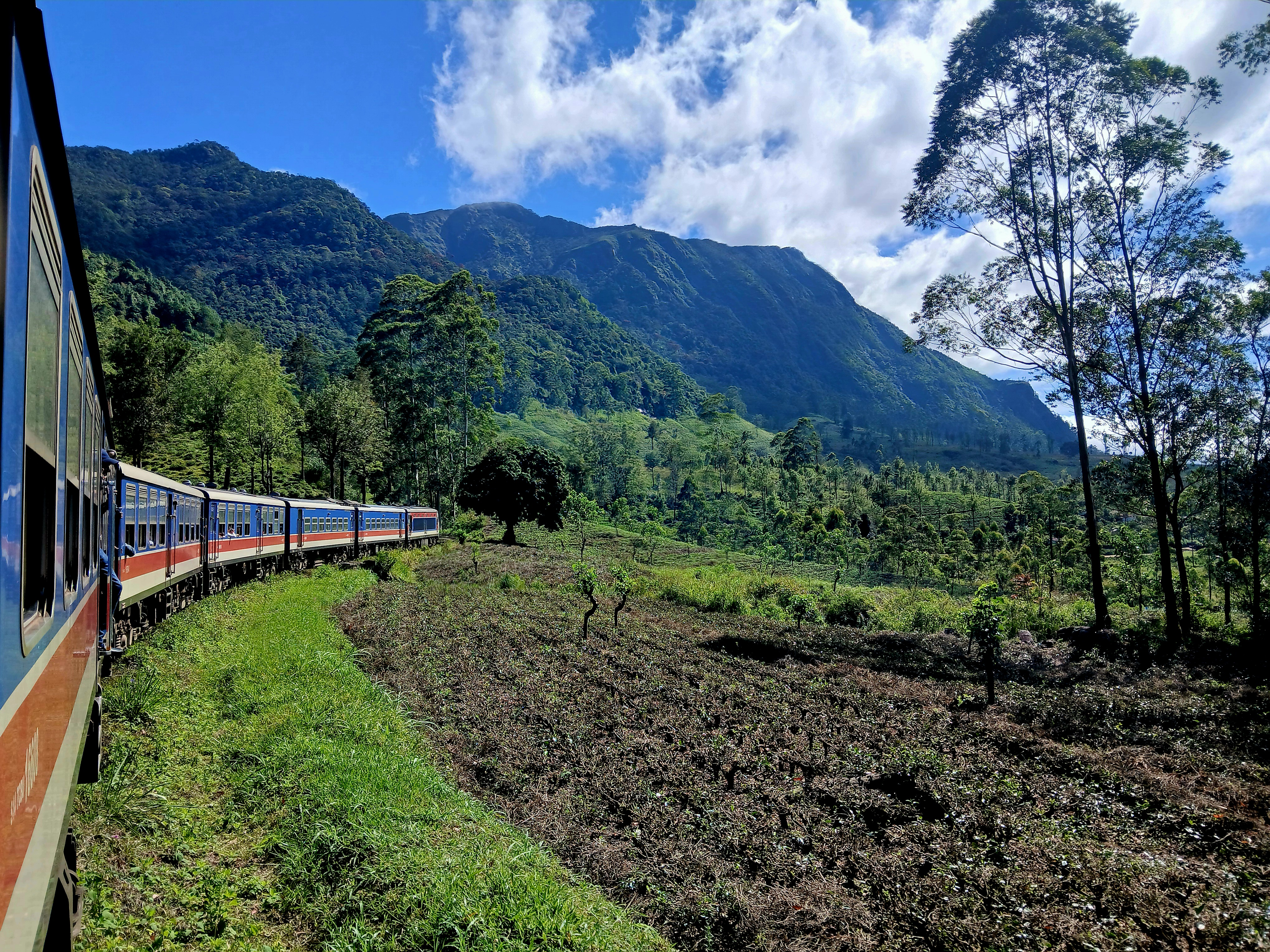
New S14 "Udarata Manike" train in the main line

Udarata Menike (Sinhala: උඩරට මැණිකේ, lit. 'Up-Country Maiden') is a daytime passenger train operated by the Sri Lanka Railways that runs between Colombo and Badulla in the Highlands. Introduced in 1956, it is one of the first Named-passenger trains and one of the most popular trains among tourists and even among railfans in Sri Lanka.

The end-to-end travel time of the route is 10–12 hours as the train climbs through the steep mountainous terrain during most of its journey.

== History ==
Named-Express Passenger trains were introduced in Ceylon in 1955 with the arrival of Class M1 and Class M2 locomotives from the United Kingdom and Canada respectively. The first train to be inaugurated was Ruhunu Kumari Express from Colombo to the Southern Sri Lankan cities of Galle and Matara. This train became very popular among Sri Lankans so the Government decided to introduce two other long-distance trains; Udarata Menike Express from Colombo to Badulla and Yarl Devi Express from Colombo to the Northern cities of Anuradhapura and Jaffna.

Both Udarata Menike and Yarl Devi made their maiden journeys on 23 April 1956. Udarata Menike was numbered No. 15 for the Upward journey to Badulla and No. 16 for the Downward journey to Colombo.

In the 1960s, The Badulla-bound train departed Colombo at 9.30 a.m., while the Colombo-bound train left Badulla at 5.45 a.m. The Train was equipped with 9 Carriages with an Observation Saloon attached to the end.

== Services ==
The train offers three classes: 1st, 2nd and 3rd, The latter sometimes gets crowded and carries only basic facilities. The train also includes a buffet car.

The observation saloon has been removed since the introduction of Class S12 DMUs.

== Route ==
The Udarata Menike travels the length of Sri Lanka Railways' Main Line through the hill country.

The Udarata Menike begins its eastbound service at Colombo Fort Station and runs east and north past the centres of Ragama, Gampaha, Veyangoda, and Polgahawela. At Rambukkana, the Main Line begins its steep climb into the hills of the upcountry. Between Balana and Kadugannawa, the track clings to the side of sheer cliffs, providing views of Batalegala ('Bible' Rock). The train then continues its climb through the scenic tea country, connecting local market centres at Gampola, Nawalapitiya, and Hatton before reaching Nanu-Oya. This is the connection to the former colonial resort of Nuwara Eliya, still visited for its temperate climate, classic hotels, and British-style gardens. The Udarata Menika continues its ascent to the summit at Pattipola, 1,898 m (6,227 ft) above sea level, before descending past Bandarawela to Badulla railway station. In the upcountry, passengers can view the tea gardens, mountains, valleys, and waterfalls.

== Rolling stock ==
The service was run by M6 locomotives pulling Romanian-built ASTRA passenger coaches. This service is now carried out by Class S14 DMUs.

== See also ==
- Sri Lanka Railways
- List of named passenger trains of Sri Lanka
