= Polgahawela =

Polgahawela පොල්ගහවෙල
- Location within Sri Lanka
- Coordinates: 7°20′4″N 80°18′11″E
- Country: Sri Lanka
- Time zone: UTC+05:30 (Sri Lanka)

Polgahawela is a town located in north western Sri Lanka. It is most notable for being a major railway junction.

Polgahawela is situated in the North Western Province of Sri Lanka, and is located approximately 80 km (50 mi) north-east from the capital city of Colombo; 50 km (31 mi) from Kandy; 20 km (12 mi) from Kurunegala; and 65 km (40 mi) from Bandaranayake International Airport. It is the location of an important railway junction in Sri Lanka Railways' network, connecting the Main Line, which runs from Colombo to Badulla and the Northern Line, which runs through to the northern port of Kankesanthurai.

== Railway station ==
Polgahawela's railway station is at the centre of the town and lies at the main junction of the Main Line and the Northern Line.

The town is notable for a major railway accident that occurred in 2005.

=== Neighbouring stations ===
Pothuhera Allawwa Polgahawela Panaliiya Thismalpola Rambukkana

Preceding station	Sri Lanka Railways	Following station
Veyangoda	Udarata Menike	Panaliya
Veyangoda	Podi Menike	Panaliya
Veyangoda	Tikiri Menike	Panaliya
Veyangoda	Senkadagala Menike	Panaliya
Veyangoda	Rajarata Rajina	Potuhara
Walakumbura	Commuter Rail	Terminus

== Notable people ==
- Malcolm Ranjith, Archbishop of Colombo and a cardinal, was born here.
- Gregory Shantha Kumara Francis, the Bishop of Kurunegala, was born here

== See also ==
- Transport in Sri Lanka
- Railway stations in Sri Lanka
- Mahamevnawa Buddhist Monastery
