= Main Line (Sri Lanka) =

Railway line in Sri Lanka

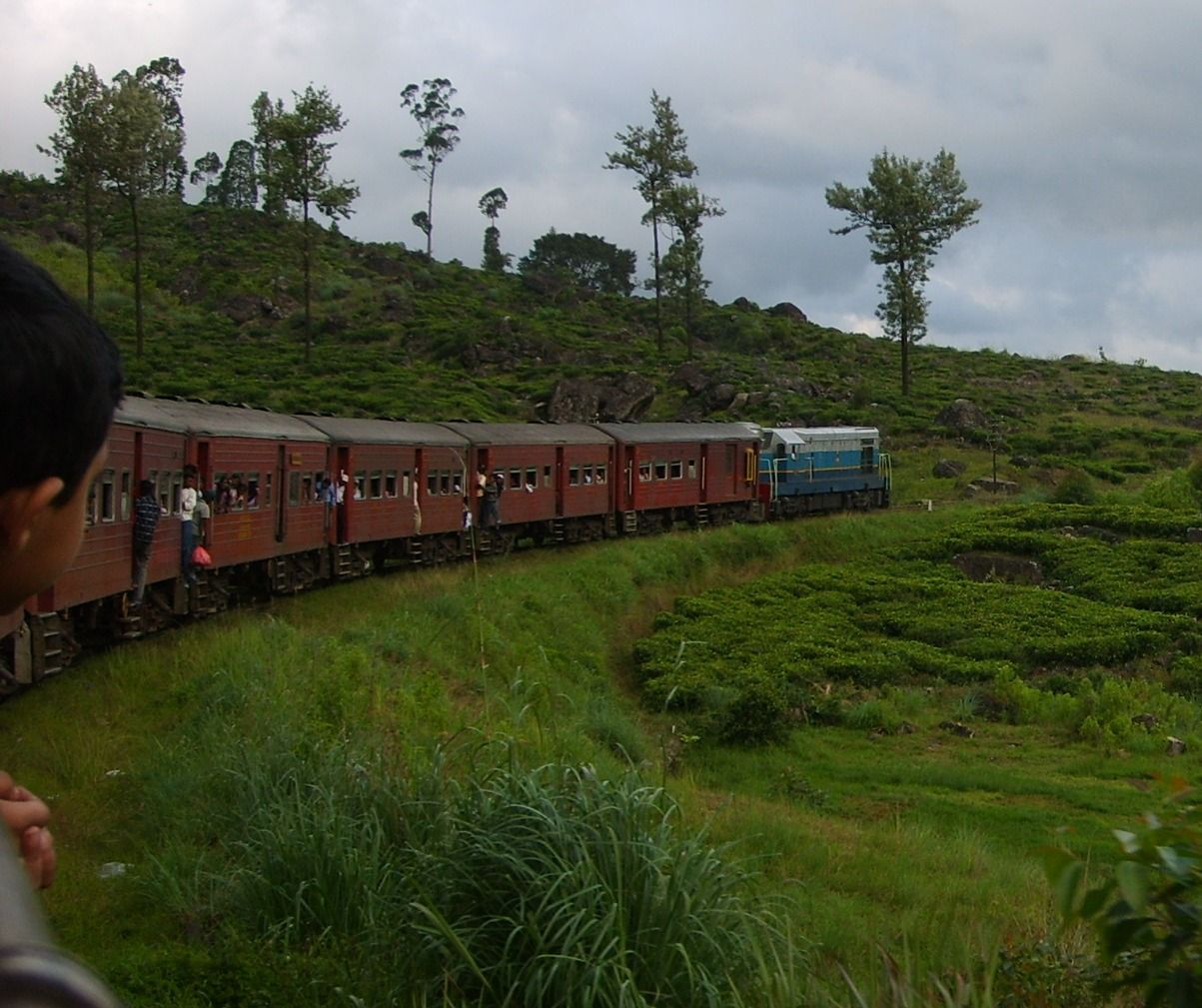
- An express train, the Udarata Menike (M2 locomotives), runs through the scenic Sri Lankan hill country

Overview
- Other names: Hill Country Line, Up Country Line
- Status: Active
- Owner: Sri Lanka Railways
- Termini: Colombo Fort; Badulla
- Stations: 105

Service
- System: Sri Lanka Railways
- Services: Udarata Menike Express Train; Podi Menike Express Train; Tikiri Menike Express Train; Senkadagala Menike Express Train; Colombo–Kandy Intercity Train; Rajadhani Express Train; Colombo–Badulla Night Mail Train; Upcountry Commuter Trains
- Operator(s): Sri Lanka Railways

History
- Opened: 1864

Technical
- Line length: 290 km (180 mi)
- Track gauge: 5 ft 6 in (1,676 mm)
- Electrification: No
- Highest elevation: 1,898.1 m (6,227 ft)

The Main Line is a major railway line in the rail network of Sri Lanka, also known to have scenic views. The line begins at Colombo Fort and winds through the Sri Lankan hill country to reach Badulla.

== Route definition ==
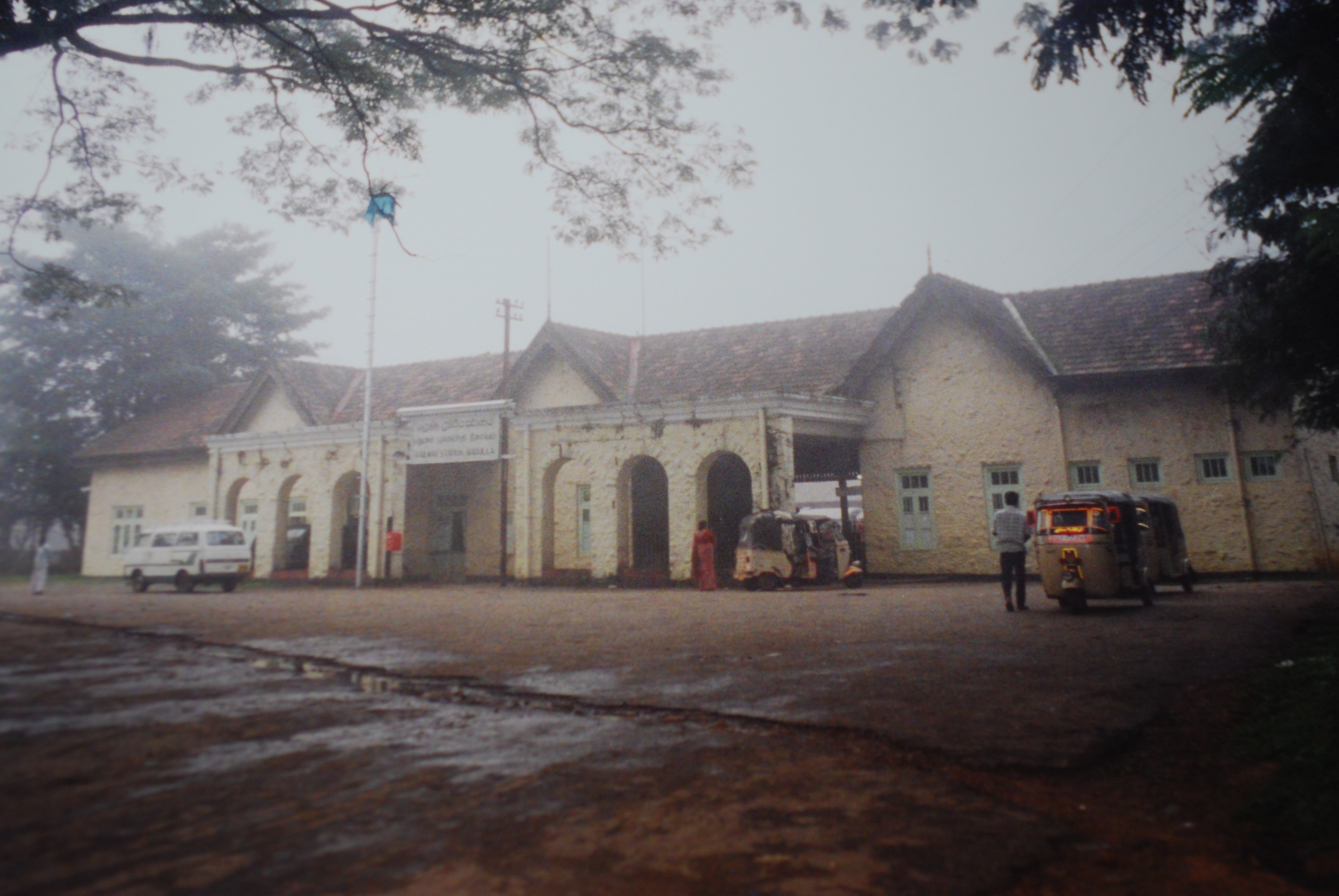
Badulla Railway station

The Main Line starts from Colombo and runs east and north past the rapidly developing centres of Ragama, Gampaha, Veyangoda, and Polgahawela.

At Rambukkana, the Main Line begins its steep climb into the hills of the upcountry. Between Balana and Kadugannawa, the track clings to the side of sheer cliffs, offering passengers views of Batalegala ('Bible' Rock).

From Peradeniya Junction, a branch line reaches Kandy and Matale.

The Main Line then continues climbing through tea country, connecting local market centres at Gampola, Nawalapitiya, and Hatton before reaching Nanu Oya. This is the connection to the former colonial resort of Nuwara Eliya, known for its temperate climate, classic hotels, and British-style gardens.

The Main Line continues its ascent to the summit at Pattipola, 1,898 m (6,227 ft) above sea level, before descending past Bandarawela to Badulla. In the upcountry, passengers can view the tea gardens, mountains and valleys, cascading torrents and waterfalls.

== History ==
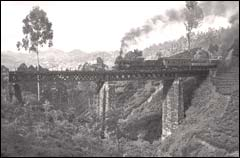
Early steam powered train on the Main line

The first segment of the Main Line was opened in 1864, with the construction of the line from Colombo to Ambepussa, 54 km (34 mi) to the east. This was the first rail line in the country. The first train ran on 27 December 1864. The line was officially opened for traffic on 2 October 1865. The main reason for building a railway system in Sri Lanka (Ceylon) was to transport tea and coffee from the hill country to Colombo.

The Main Line was extended in stages with service to Kandy beginning in 1867, to Nawalapitiya in 1874, to Nanu Oya in 1885, to Bandarawela in 1894, and to Badulla in 1924.

Till 1953, the Main line operated with steam locomotives. In the 1950s, service was enhanced with diesel locomotives, under the leadership of B. D. Rampala. Various types of diesel locomotives were added to the service.

In 2011, ExpoRail and Rajadhani Express began operating a premium section on trains on the Main Line. These services were launched to improve rail transport's appeal to the public.

Sri Lanka Railways also began importing new diesel-multiple units to replace the aging rolling stock previously used on the line. The new S12 trainsets built by China's CSR Corporation Limited in 2012 are designed to work on the steep gradients of the hill country. The new S14 trainsets built by China's CRRC Qingdao Sifang in 2019–2020 are currently in use.

The commuter rail portion of the line, within the Colombo metropolitan area, is planned to be electrified, though no ground work has started.

== Operators and service providers ==
Sri Lanka Railways operates most passenger services on the Main Line. Sri Lanka Railway's most notable services on the line includes the Udarata Menike (S14), Podi Menike (S14), Tikiri Menike (S12), Senkadagala Menike (S12) and Colombo–Kandy Intercity (S12, M5 and M6).

ExpoRail and Rajadhani Express operate premium services on the Main Line. They run premium carriages attached to Sri Lanka Railways-operated trains.

== Infrastructure ==
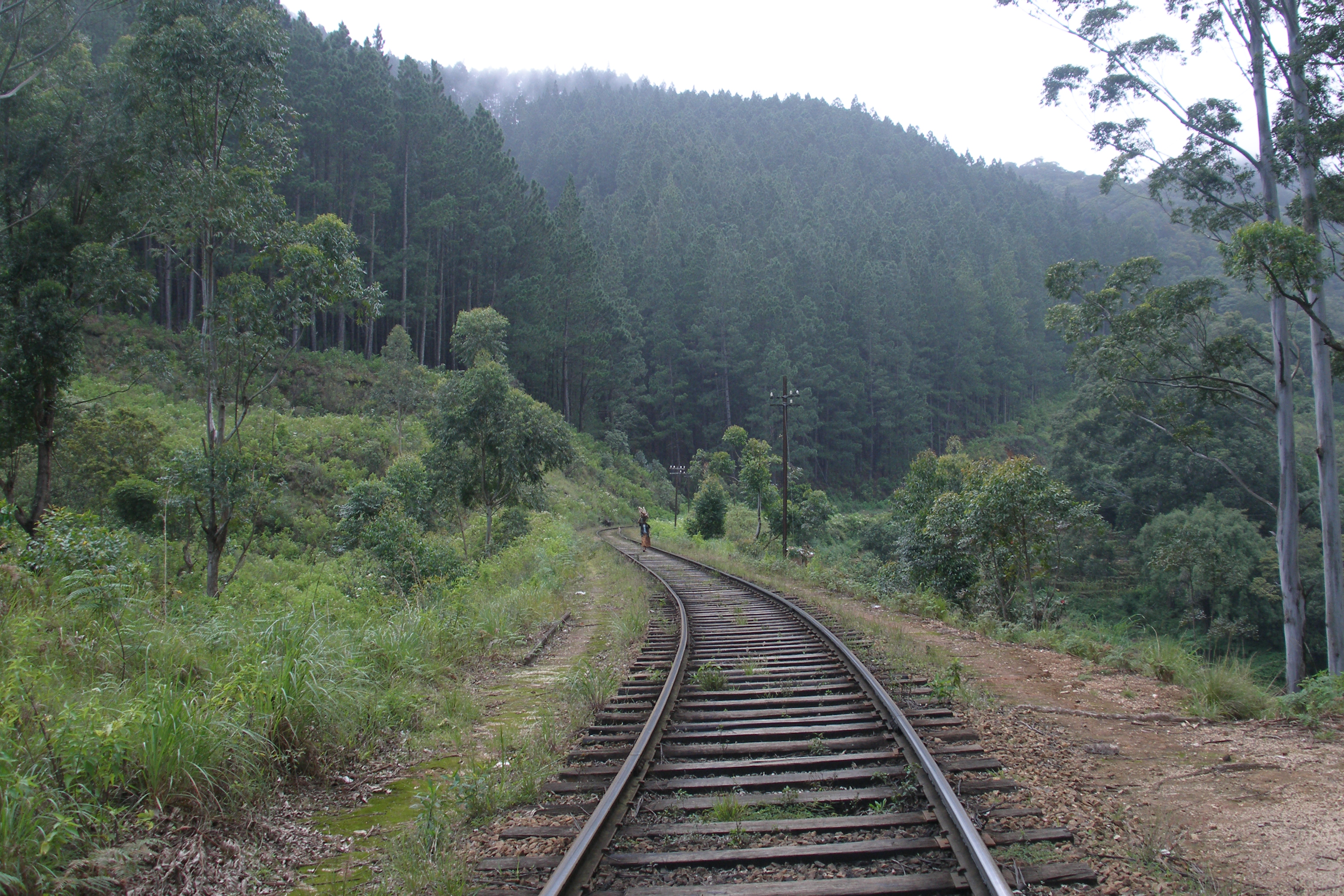
Railway track near Haputale

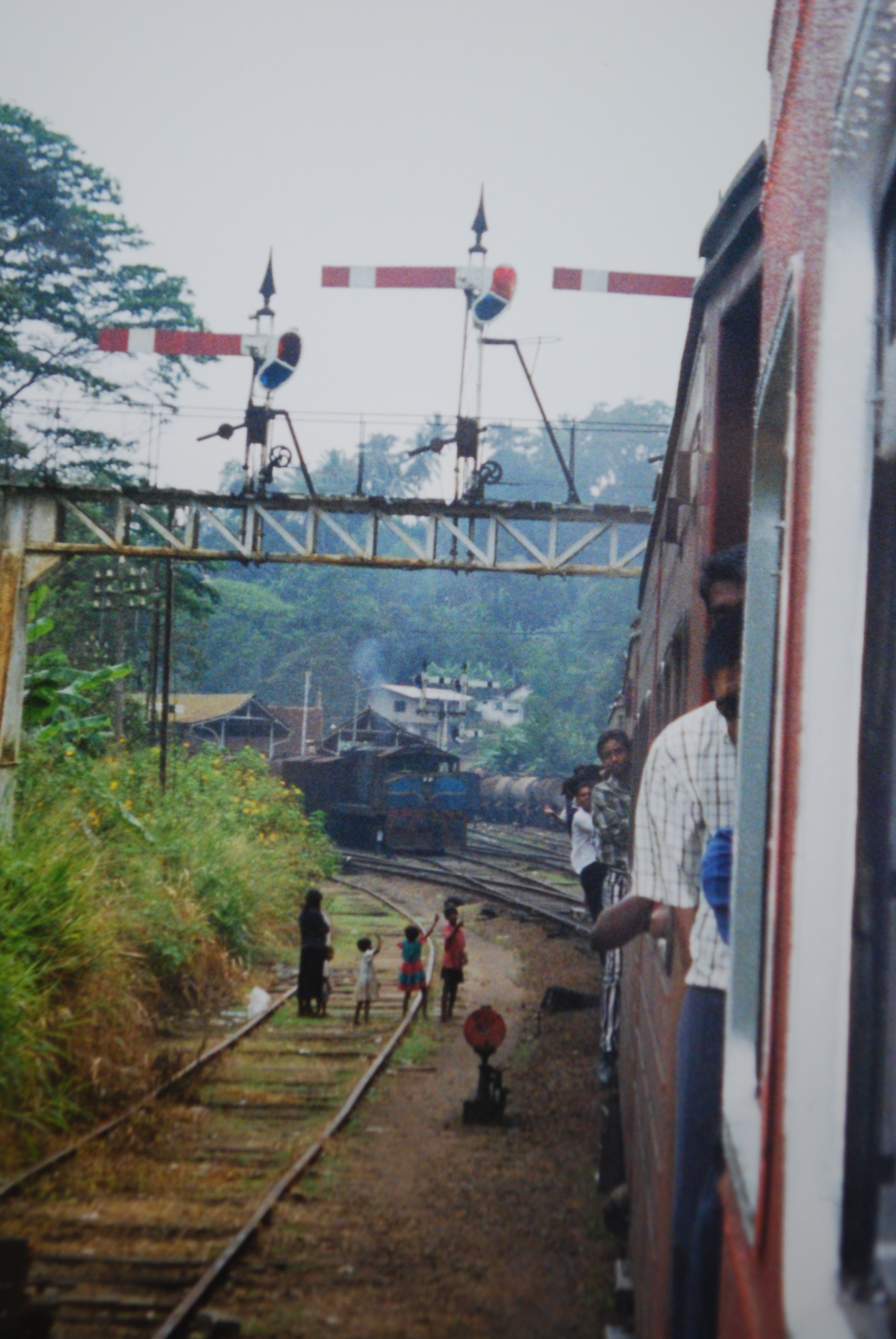
Older railway infrastructure on the Main line, including a gantry of semaphore signals at Kandy Station

The Main Line has a gauge of 5 ft 6 in (1,676 mm) broad gauge.

The Main Line is not electrified. Regular services run on diesel power. However, there are plans to electrify the commuter rail network, within Colombo. This includes the Main-line segment between Colombo Fort and Veyangoda.

Most of the line currently operates on a lock-and-block signaling system. The commuter rail section was upgraded to electric signalling in the mid-twentieth century. The system is connected to a centralised traffic control panel at Maradana Railway Station.
