= Sri Lanka Railways =

Sri Lankan government-owned railway

- Native name: ශ්‍රී ලංකා දුම්රිය සේවය (Sinhala) இலங்கை புகையிரத சேவை (Tamil)
- Type: Government-owned corporation
- Industry: Rail transport
- Founded: 1858; 168 years ago
- Headquarters: Colombo, Sri Lanka
- Key people: W.A.D.S. Gunasinghe, (general manager)
- Services: Passenger railways Freight services Parcel carrier Catering and tourism services Parking lot operations Other related services
- Revenue: ▲ Rs 7.412 billion (2018)
- Operating income: ▼ Rs −22.21 billion (2018)
- Net income: ▼ Rs −6.97 billion (2018)
- Owner: Government of Sri Lanka
- Number of employees: ▲14,885 (2018)
- Rail map of Sri Lanka
Overview
- Reporting mark: SLR
Technical
- Track gauge: 1,676 mm (5 ft 6 in)
- Electrification: 78 kilometres (48 mi) (Planned)
- Length: 1,508 km (937 mi) (track length)
- Website: railway.gov.lk

The Sri Lanka Railway Department (more commonly known as Sri Lanka Railways (SLR)) (Sinhala: ශ්‍රී ලංකා දුම්රිය සේවය Śrī Laṃkā Dumriya Sēvaya; Tamil: இலங்கை புகையிரத சேவை Ilankai Pugaiyiradha Sēvai) is Sri Lanka's railway owner and primary operator. As part of the Sri Lankan government, it is overseen by the Ministry of Transport. Founded in 1858 as the Ceylon Government Railway, it operates the nation's railways and links Colombo (the capital) with other population centres and tourist destinations.

The Sri Lankan rail network is 1,508 km (937 mi) of 5 ft 6 in (1,676 mm) broad gauge. Some of its routes are scenic, with the main line passing (or crossing) waterfalls, mountains, tea estates, pine forests, bridges and peak stations.

== History ==
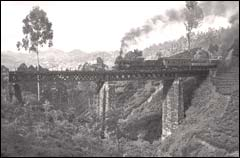
1880 steam-powered train on the hill-country Colombo-Badulla line

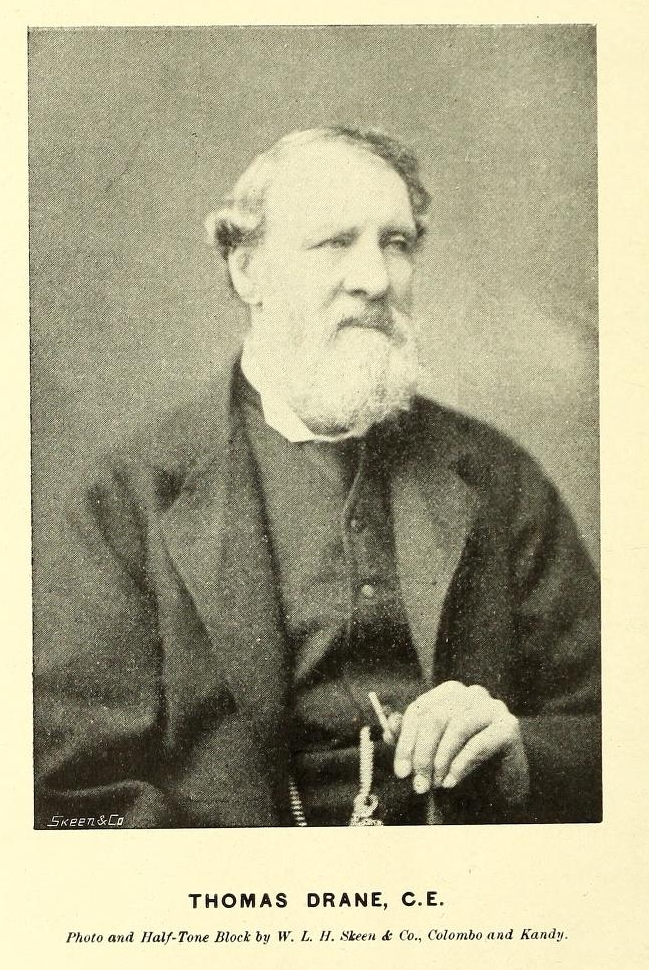
Thomas Drane

Ceylon Railway Company's Dissolution Act 1862 (Note: Section 5.)
- Act of Parliament
- Parliament of the United Kingdom
- Long title: An Act for dissolving the Ceylon Railway Company, and for other Purposes connected therewith.
- Citation: 25 & 26 Vict. c. ci
- Territorial extent: United Kingdom

Dates
- Royal assent: 30 June 1862
- Commencement: 30 June 1862 (Note: The Acts of Parliament (Commencement) Act 1793.)
- Repealed: 31 January 2013
Other legislation
Repealed by	Statute Law (Repeals) Act 2013

Status: Repealed

Text of statute as originally enacted

The construction of a railway in Ceylon was first raised in 1842 by European coffee planters seeking a line be constructed between Kandy and Colombo as a quicker more efficient means to transport their product for export. After protracted negotiations the Ceylon Railway Company was established in 1845, under the chair of Philip Anstruther, Colonial Secretary of Ceylon, to build the colony's first railway. In 1846 the company's engineer, Thomas Drane, undertook preliminary surveys for the new rail line. In December 1856 Captain William Scarth Moorsom, Chief Engineer of the Corps of Royal Engineers, was sent from England to assess the project for the Secretary of State for the Colonies, Henry Labouchere. His report, issued May 1857, considered six alternative routes to Kandy and recommended the adoption of Route No.3 via the Parnepettia Pass, with a total length of 127 km (79 mi), a ruling gradient of one in 60, with a short tunnel at an estimated cost of £856,557. The initial sod turning was on 3 August 1858 (near the present Maradana railway station) by Governor Sir Henry Ward. The Ceylon Railway Company's contractor, William Thomas Doyne, soon realised that it was impossible to complete the work on the estimate submitted. In 1861, the contract with the Ceylon Railway Company was terminated, the subscribed capital paid off, and the government took over the construction work, under the name Ceylon Government Railway (now Sri Lanka Railway). At the end of 1862 the Crown Agents for the Colonies accepted, on behalf of the Government of Ceylon, a tender from William Frederick Faviell for the construction of 117 km (73 mi) of railway between Colombo and Kandy.

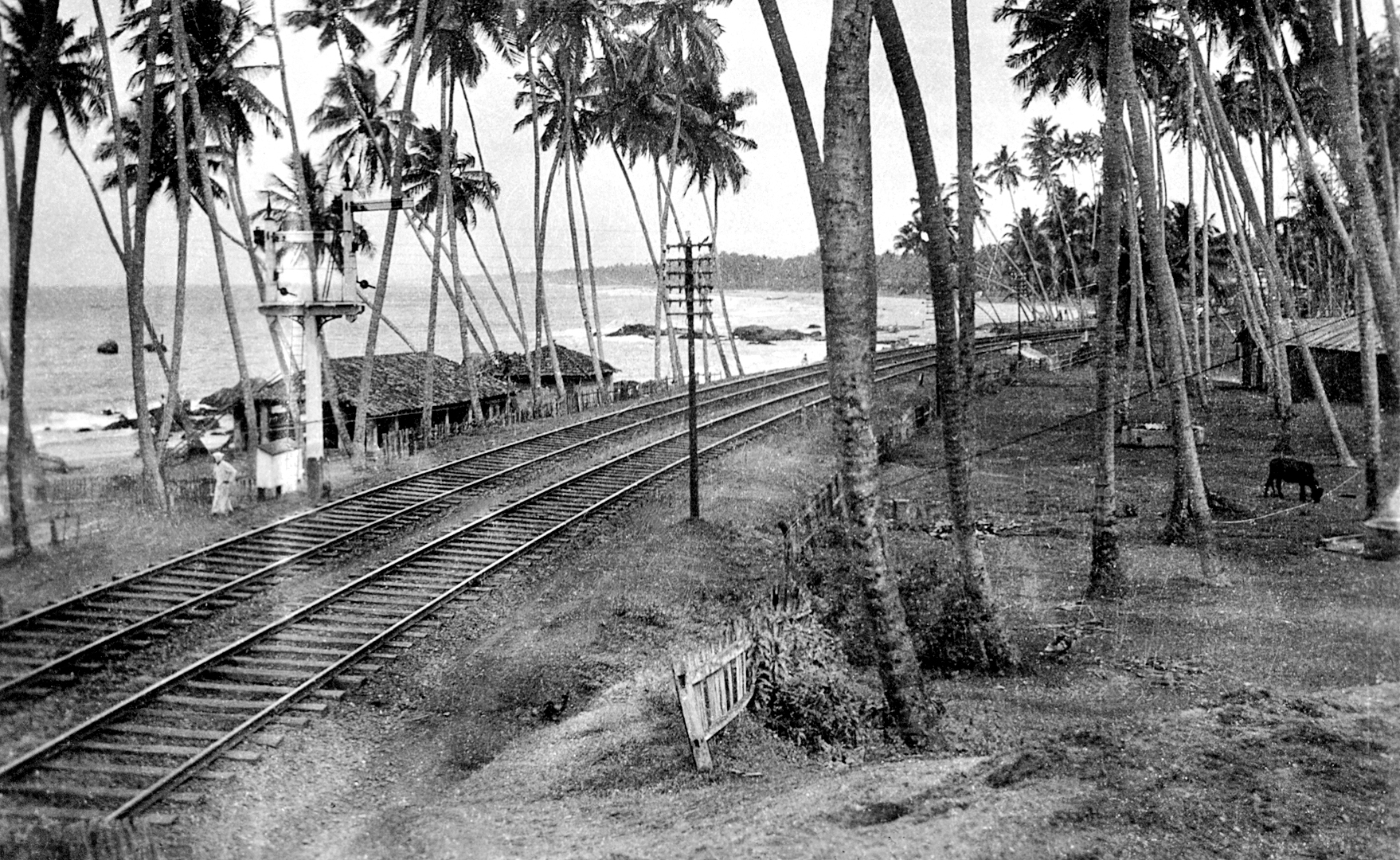
Rail lines near Colombo in 1940

The service began with a 54-kilometre (34 mi) main line connecting Colombo and Ambepussa. Sir Guilford Lindsey Molesworth, the first chief engineer, became director general of the government railway. Many Ceylonese people referred to the trains as (Sinhala:අගුරු කකා වතුර බිබී කොළඹ දුවන යකඩ යකා) Anguru Kaka Wathura Bibi Colaba Duwana Yakada Yaka ("coal-eating, water-drinking, metal monster which is sprinting to Colombo").

Extensions were made to the main line in 1867, 1874, 1885, 1894 and 1924 to Kandy, Nawalapitiya, Nanu Oya, Bandarawela and Badulla. Other lines were added to the rail system during its first century, including an 1880 line to Matale; the 1895 Coast Railway Line; the 1905 Northern Line; the 1914 Mannar Line; the 1919 Kelani Valley Line; the 1926 Puttalam Line, and the 1928 line to Batticaloa and Trincomalee. For more than 80 years after that, no major extensions were added to the Ceylonese rail network.

Rail infrastructure was improved from 1955 to 1970 under the management of B. D. Rampala, chief mechanical engineer and general manager of the Ceylon Government Railway. Emphasising punctuality and comfort, Rampala led upgrades to major stations outside Colombo and the rebuilding of track in the Eastern Province to facilitate heavier, faster trains. He introduced express trains (many of which had iconic names), and ensured that Ceylon's rail system was up to date and offered comfort to its passengers. Until 1953, Ceylon's railways used steam locomotives. During 1960s and 70s, they changed to diesel locomotives under Rampala's leadership.

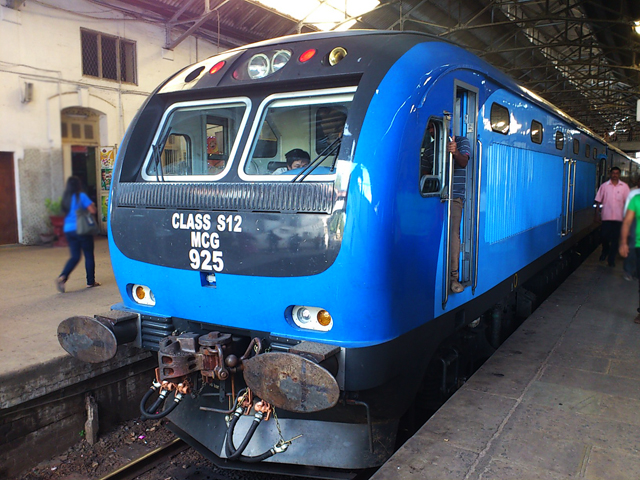
S12 DMUs were imported in 2012.

The government began a 10-year railway-development strategy in the early 2010s, ordering replacement DMUs. The southern line, which was damaged in the 2004 tsunami, was upgraded from 2010 to 2012; its track was upgraded to handle train speeds of 100 km/h (62 mph). Sri Lanka Railways began partnering with ExpoRail and Rajadhani Express in 2011 for premium service on major routes. Its northern line, affected by almost three decades of war, is being rebuilt; in 2015, it was restored to Jaffna and Kankesanthurai at pre-war levels The maximum speed on this line is currently 120 km/h(74 mph). The southern line is being extended from Matara to Kataragama to serve the developing city of Hambantota. In 2019, track construction to Beliaththa was completed.

== Rolling stock ==
In 1936, the Ceylon Government Railways owned 261 locomotives, 30 steam railcars, 1591 coaches and 3259 goods wagons. As of 2026, Sri Lanka Railways operates 396 trains. The train system carries 3,72 million passengers daily.

=== Locomotives ===
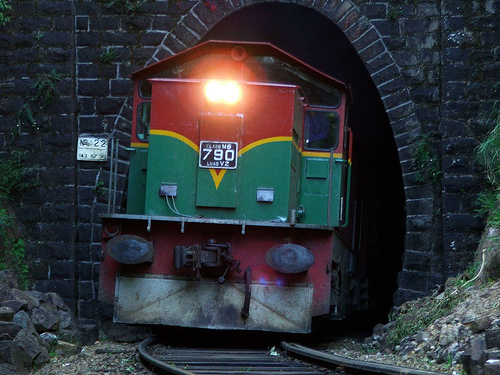
M6 locomotive pulling the Udarata Menike from Badulla to Colombo

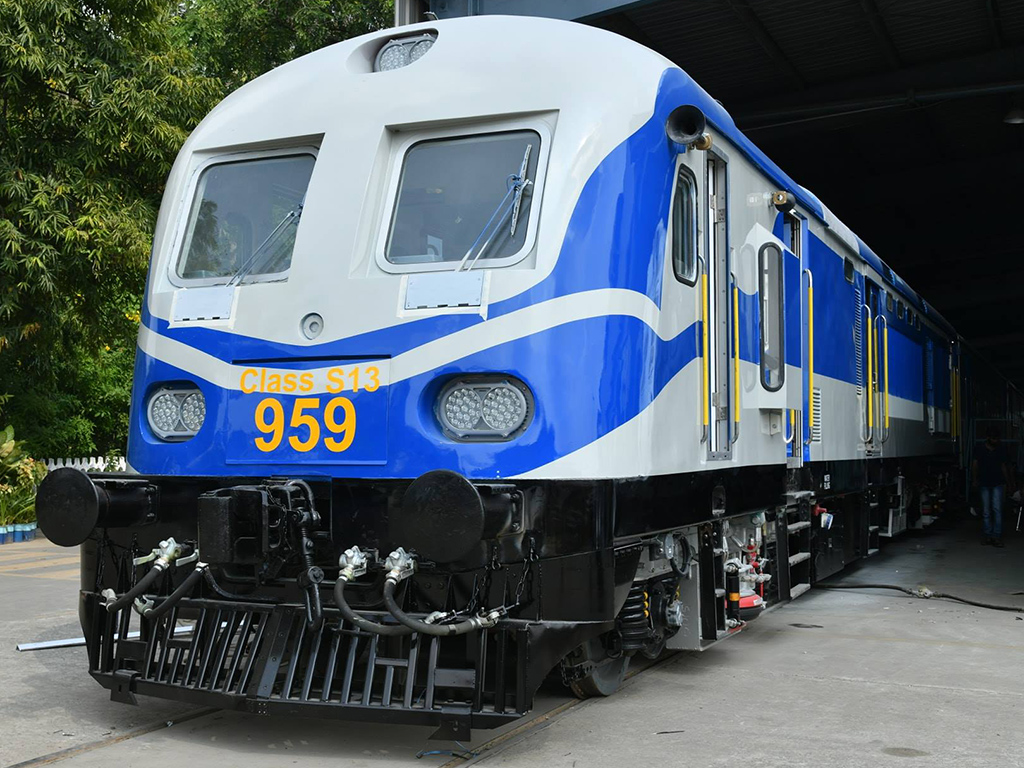
An S13 DMU

Sri Lanka Railways' locomotives are primarily diesel. Steam locomotives, in regular service until the late 1970s, are used on heritage trains such as the Viceroy Special.

The first locomotives pulled trains during the 1860s on the original 54-kilometre (34 mi) main line connecting Colombo and Ambepussa. Sri Lanka Railways converted to diesel locomotives in 1953, and several types were added to its fleet. Although Sri Lanka did not have commercially-operating electric locomotives or trainsets in 2011, electrification has been proposed to improve energy efficiency and sustainability.

=== Coaches ===
Different Coaching Stocks used in Sri Lanka Railways
No.	Code	Type	Notes
1	AFC	Air-conditioned First Class	-
2	RS	Reserved Saloon	-
3	RC	Restaurant Car	-
4	NF	Berth (First Class)	-
5	NS	Berth (Second Class)	-
6	SC	Second Class	-
7	SBC	Second Bus Class	-
8	TC	Third Class	-
9	TCG	Third Class & Guard	-
10	ST	Second & Third Class composite	-
11	SV	Second Class & Brake Van	-
12	TV	Third Class & Brake Van	-
13	TCBU	Third Class & Buffet Car	-
14	OFV	Observation Saloon	-
15	SCS	Second Class Sleeperettes	-
16	TCS	Third Class Sleeperettes	-
17	ARS	Air-conditioned Reserved Saloon	-
18	GV	Generator Van	-
19	PBV	Parcel & Brake Van	-
20	POV	Post Office Van	-
21	MCG	S12 & S14 Engines	-

Different Coaches from various manufacturers used in Sri Lanka Railways
Photo	Sr.No.	Manufacturer	Country of origin	Year	Quantity built	Length (in feet)	Notes
	1	SLR Rathmalana Works	Sri Lanka	1939	29	45 ft.	Out of Service; a few maybe spotted with departmental duty trains.
	2	China CNR	China	1964	44	55 ft.	Almost all scrapped; a few Third Class Guard Vans are in service with freight trains and also with Chinese coach rakes made in 2007
-	3	Astra Rail Industries	Romania	1976	13	55 ft.	1st Batch of Romanian coaches
-	4	Astra Rail Industries	Romania	1979-1980	188	55 ft. & 45 ft.	2nd Batch of Romanian coaches
	5	BEML	India	1980	34	45 ft. & 50 ft.	Most of them scrapped; a few Sleeperette coaches are in service with Night Mail trains, and also used in departmental duty.
-	6	Astra Rail Industries	Romania	1981	90	55 ft.	3rd Batch of Romanian coaches
	7	Astra Rail Industries	Romania	1989	130	55 ft. & 45 ft.	4th Batch of Romanian coaches. Later refurbished by Tantri Trailer (Pvt.) Ltd.
	8	Astra Rail Industries	Romania	1990s	312	55 ft. & 45 ft.	5th Batch of Romanian coaches. Later refurbished by Tantri Trailer (Pvt.) Ltd.
	9	China CNR	China	2007-2008	100	65 ft.	Withdrawn from service in 2020 due to faulty brake system. A few coaches were returned to limited service after brake retrofitting.
	10	Integral Coach Factory (ICF), Chennai	India	2020-2022	160	65 ft.	Ordered to replace faulty Chinese coaches and Romanian coaches nearing end of service life. Mainly to be used for on the Northern & Coastal lines.

Most of the passenger coaches that are in service are either manufactured by the Romanian Astra Rail Industries or by ICF, Chennai. On most lines, service is being upgraded with long-haul diesel multiple units from CSR Corporation and India's RITES.

== Network ==
The 1,508-kilometre (937 mi) Sri Lankan railway network is 5 ft 6 in (1,676 mm) broad gauge. All service is diesel-powered. The network is divided into three operating regions based in Colombo, Anuradhapura and Nawalapitiya. The railway is modernising and extending the Coastal Line for faster trains and improved efficiency.

=== Electrification ===
Although electrification was first proposed in 1928, the cabinet did not approve the electrification of suburban railways until 2015. Electrification of the Panadura-Veyangoda line is proposed in phase one of the Western Region Megapolis plan with a soft loan from the Asian Development Bank.

A contract was signed by Malaysia's Airport Express Air and Rail Company and the government of Sri Lanka for a new electric rail line between Negombo and Colombo, and the project was expected to be completed by 2018. Electrification of the busiest sections of the network was proposed several times to improve energy efficiency and sustainability. Around 1998, the Institution of Engineers, Sri Lanka (IESL) submitted recommendations for railway electrification. Although they were approved by the cabinet, they were not implemented. The IESL made new proposals for electrification in 2008 and 2010, but no work was done because the voltage systems were undefined. System electrification is favoured by the IESL to reduce pollution and travel time and increase passenger comfort.

Although Sri Lanka Railways is planning to electrify the 120-kilometre (75 mi) Colombo commuter-rail system from Veyangoda to Maradana, Maradana to Kaluthara and Ragama to Negombo, their voltage systems are unknown. Fifteen electric multiple units will be imported for commuter service.

=== Signalling ===
Much of the network uses a lock-and-block signaling system. During the mid-twentieth century, the busiest sectors (around Colombo) were upgraded to electronic signalling connected to a CTC control panel at the Maradana railway station.

In 2011, a project to add electronic signalling to the northern lines began. Track between Anuradhapura, Kankesanturai, and Talaimannar would have electronic signalling with centralised traffic control: an interlocking colour-light system with electrically operated points and a track-detection system. Level crossings would be connected to the signalling system, ensuring safety.

After the 2011 Alawwa rail accident, SLR began installing a GPS-based train-protection system on its fleet. The system warns a train driver of a possible collision in time to manually stop the train. The fleet can also be monitored by a central control room with the system. A trial run with ten trains was conducted in early November 2011.

=== Routes ===
Major population centres and tourist destinations are connected by rail. Service began in 1864 with the construction of the Main Line from Colombo to Ambepussa, 54 kilometres (34 mi) east, and the first train ran on 27 December 1864. The line was officially opened to traffic on 2 October 1865. The Main Line was extended in stages, with service to Kandy in 1867, to Nawalapitiya in 1874, to Nanu-Oya in 1885, to Bandarawela in 1894, and to Badulla in 1924. Other lines were completed to link the country: the Matale Line in 1880, the Coastal Line in 1895, the Northern Line in 1905, the Mannar Line in 1914, the Kelani Valley Line in 1919, the Puttalam Line in 1926, and the Batticaloa and Trincomalee Lines in 1928.

Main Line

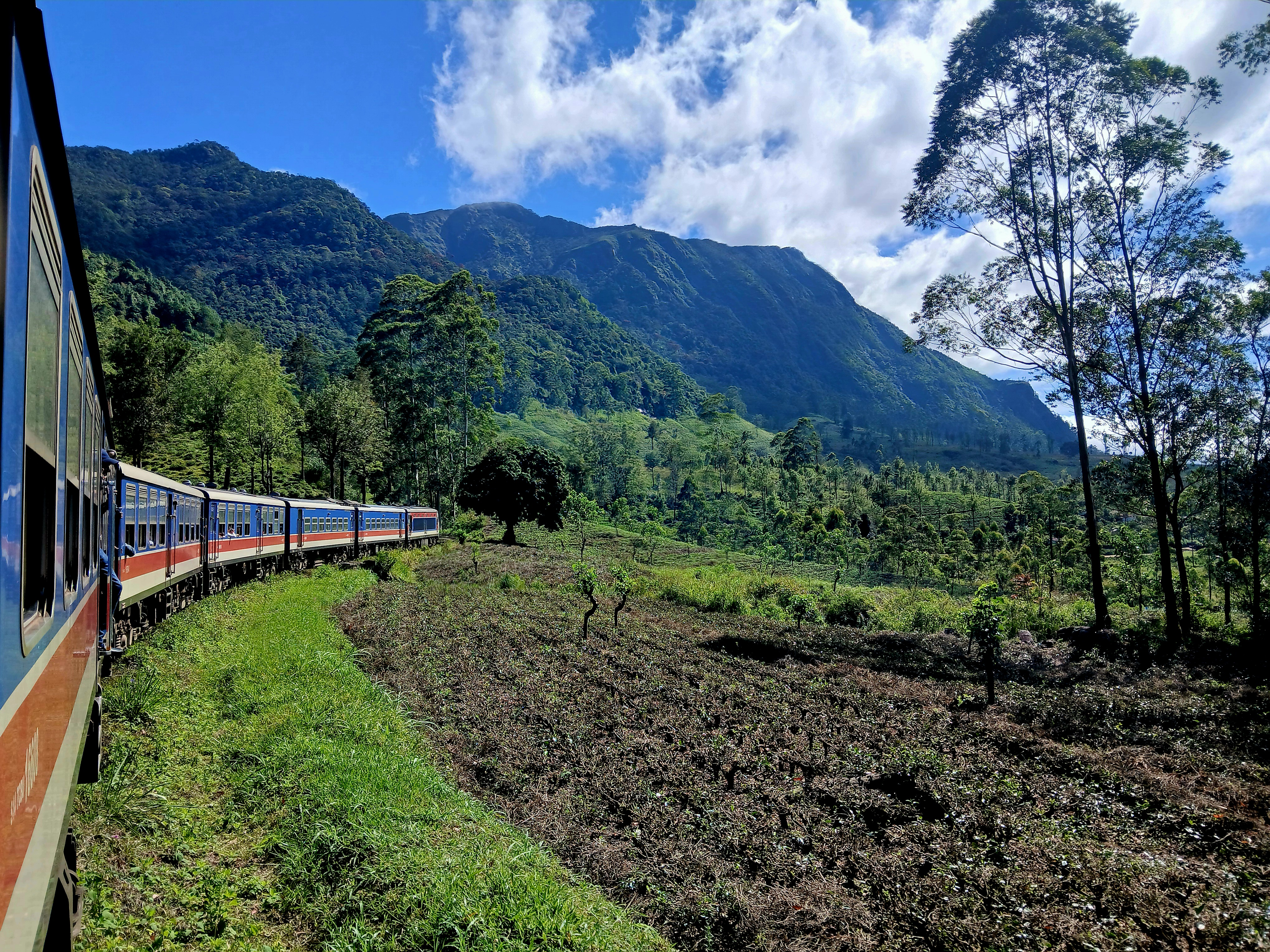
"Udarata Manike" train in the main line

The Main Line begins in Colombo and runs east and north past the developing centres of Ragama, Ganemulla Gampaha, Veyangoda, Mirigama, Ambepussa and Polgahawela. At Rambukkana, the line begins a steep climb into the hills. The track runs along the edge of sheer cliffs between Balana and Kadugannawa, allowing passengers a view of Batalegala.

The line then continues climbing through tea country, connecting market centers at Gampola, Nawalapitiya and Hatton before reaching Nanu Oya. This is the connection to the former colonial resort of Nuwara Eliya, still visited for its temperate climate, classic hotels and British-style gardens. The Main Line reaches its summit at Pattipola, 6,226 feet (1,898 m) above sea level, before descending past Bandarawela to Badulla. Passengers can view tea gardens, mountains, valleys and waterfalls.
Coastal line

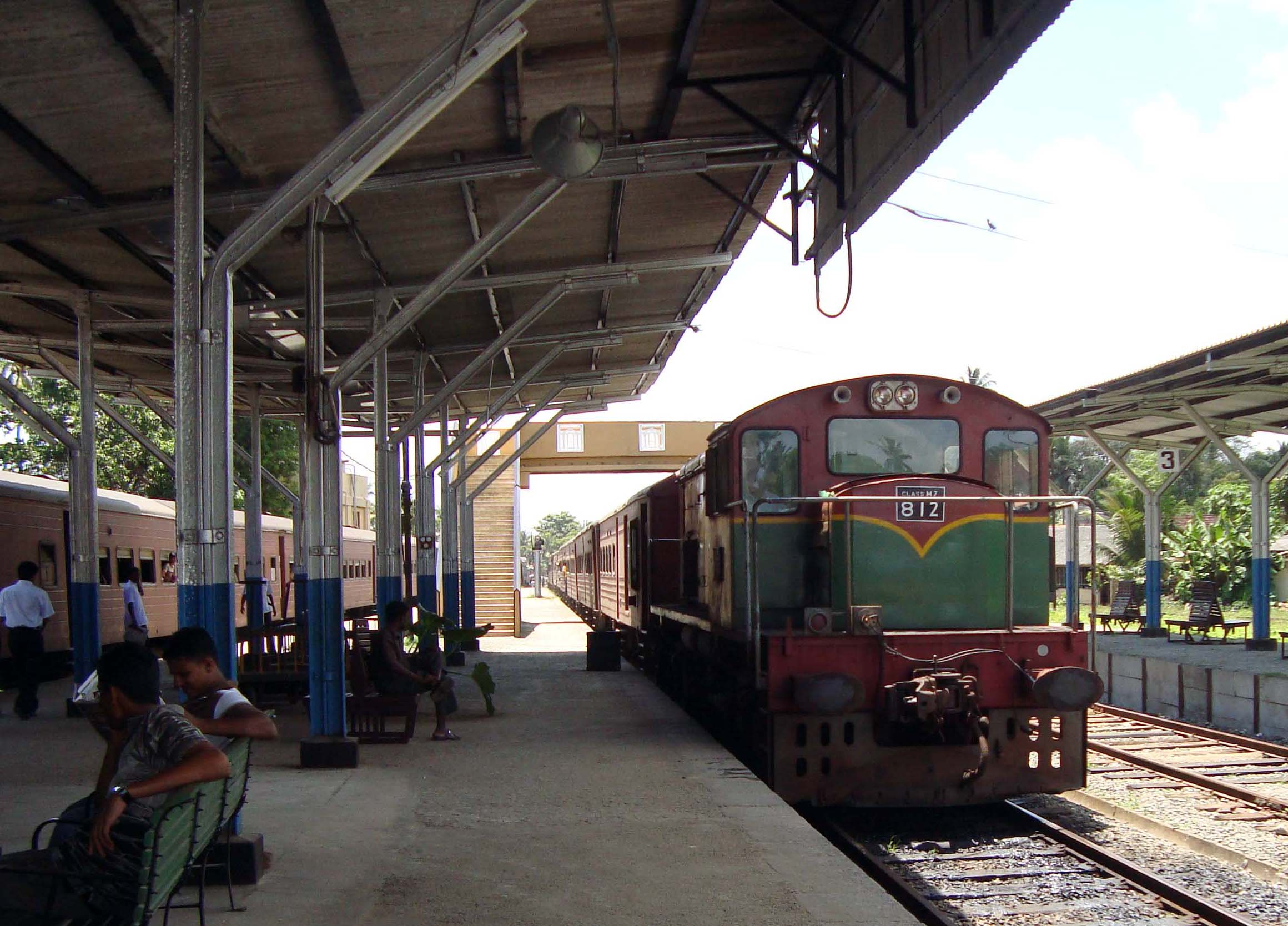
The coastal line's Matara terminus

The coastal line runs south from Colombo, following the Indian Ocean, with views of tropical beaches and coconut palm trees. It links the regional centres of Moratuwa, Panadura and Kalutara, and beach resorts at Aluthgama, Ambalangoda and Hikkaduwa. The line continues past Galle (known for its historic, preserved Dutch fort), ending in Beliatta.

From 1895 to 2013, the line ended in Matara. From 2013 to 2019, the China National Machinery Import and Export Corporation extended the line to Beliatta in phase one of the Southern Railway project; it was the first new railway built in Sri Lanka since its independence from Great Britain in 1948. Phase two will serve Magampura Mahinda Rajapaksa Port in Hambantota, and phase three will reach Kataragama; in April 2019, they had not yet begun construction.
Puttalam line
The Puttalam line branches off the Main Line at Ragama, extending north past Kandana Ja-Ela, Seeduwa, Katunayake (Colombo International Airport) and Negombo (a commercial centre and regional tourist destination). It connects northwestern Sri Lanka, reaching Negombo Kochikade, Waikkala, Lunuwila (and the National Coconut Research Center), Nattandiya, Madampe, Chilaw, Bangadeniya, Mundel and Puttalam. The line also links other market towns and fishing villages. Passenger service ends at the Noor Nagar station, just north of Puttalam. Beyond that, the tracks are used by INSEE Puttalam Cement Works trains to haul cement.
Kelani Valley line
The Kelani Valley line extends from Maradana east to Avissawella. Originally a narrow-gauge line, it was converted to 5 ft 6 in (1,676 mm) broad gauge between 1991 and 1997. The line connects the Colombo suburbs in the district with the city.
Matale line
The Matale line branches off the Main Line at Peradeniya Junction, near the Peradeniya Botanical Gardens. It runs to Kandy, home of the Sri Dalada Maligawa (which houses the relic of the tooth of the Buddha), before descending to Matale.
Northern line

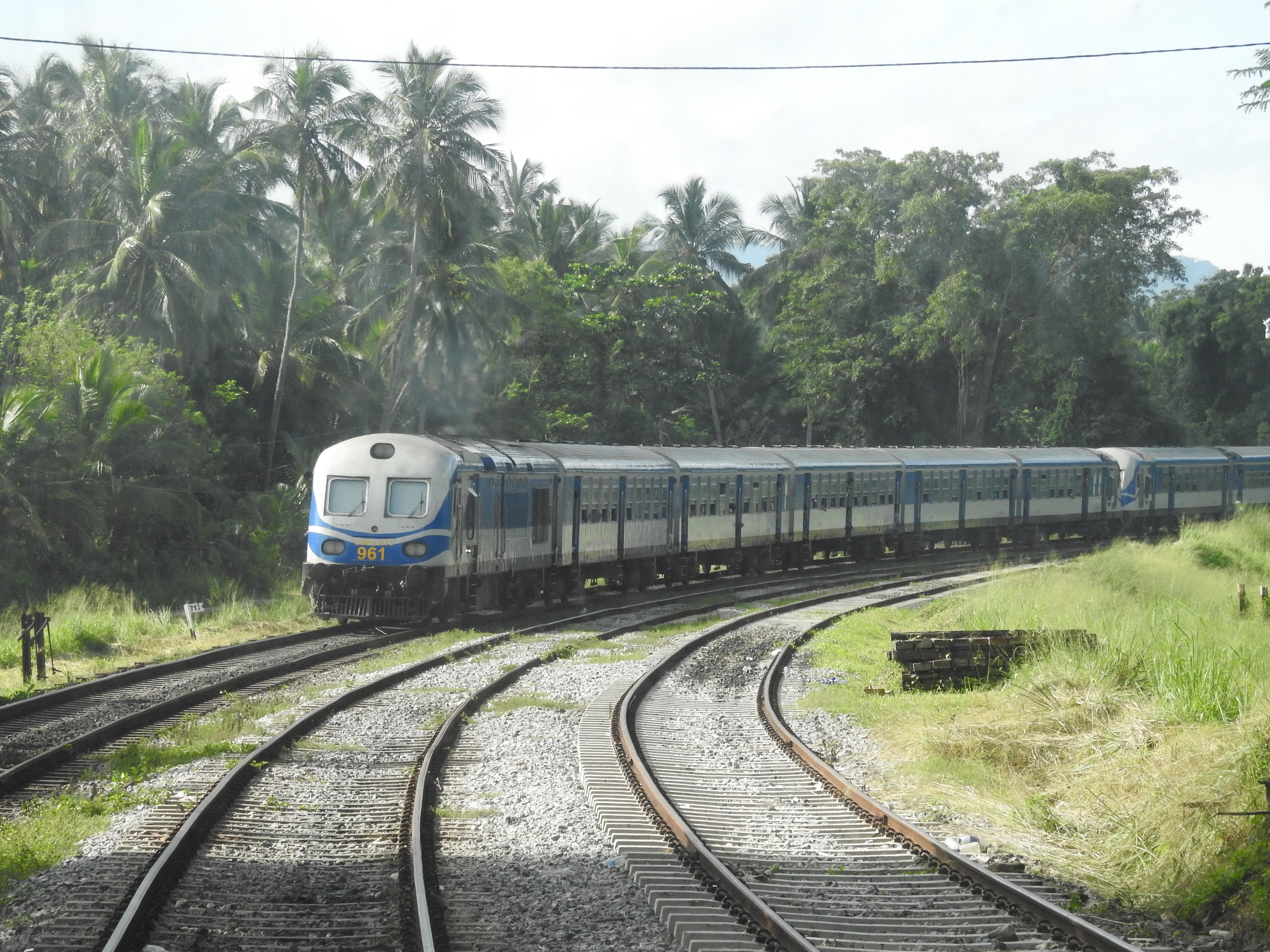
Northern line

The northern line branches north from the Main Line at Polgahawela, passing Kurunegala (capital of North Western Province) before continuing to the cultural center of Anuradhapura: the island's capital around the 4th century BCE, and home to a number of religious and archaeological sites. Service has been extended to the line's terminus at Kankesanthurai on the Jaffna Peninsula, past Kilinochchi.
Mannar line
The Mannar line branches westward from the northern line at Medawachchiya, passing Madhu Road (location of the Shrine of Our Lady of Madhu) and continuing to Mannar Island: home of the district capital and terminus of the former Talaimannar line.
Batticaloa line
The Batticaloa line branches eastward from the northern line at Maho to Polonnaruwa, site of an 11th-century capital and home to a number of historic monuments, before continuing to the city of Batticaloa.
Trincomalee line
The Trincomalee line branches north and east from the Batticaloa line at Gal Oya Junction and extends to Trincomalee.
Mihintale line
The Mihintale line is a short branch line which connects Mihintale (home of the Mihintale Temple, where Thera Mahinda – who brought Buddhism to Sri Lanka – arrived) with Anuradhapura (the capital of Sri Lanka for over 100 years) via the northern line. It branches off the latter at Mihintale Junction and runs eastward to Mihintale (the line's only stations).
Intercity network
The intercity network radiates from Colombo, connecting most major population and industrial centres with passenger and freight service, and includes hubs at Colombo Fort and Maradana.

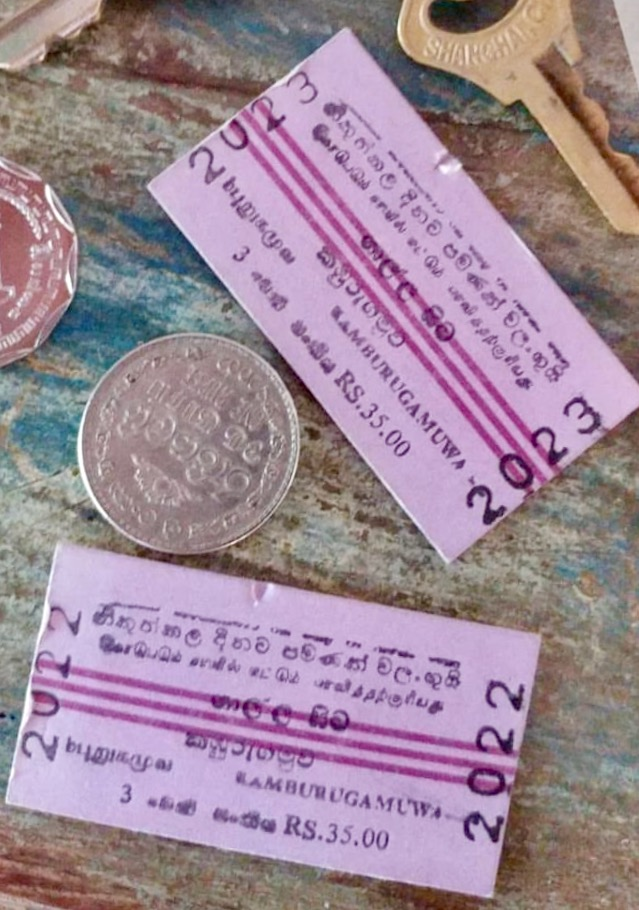
3rd class train tickets for travel on the Coastal Line

== Railway services ==
Sri Lanka Railways has intercity service connecting major population centres, and commuter rail serving Colombo commuters. The railway also transports freight. Most intercity trains have several classes:

- 1st class sleeper, with sleeping berths, is available on a few overnight trains.
- 1st class observation car is available on some day trains, primarily on the Main Line. Normally at the rear of the train, it is occasionally behind the locomotive.
- 1st class air-conditioned seats are available on some intercity express trains between Colombo and Vavunia and Colombo and Batticaloa. They are also available on the main-line Udarata Manike and Podi Manike trains.
- 2nd class seats, available on all intercity trains, are unreserved or reserved.
- 3rd class, available on most trains, have basic bench seats and fans.

Commuter trains serve the busiest portions of Colombo and its suburbs. Most commuter trains are diesel multiple units and lack the three-class configuration of intercity service. Commuter trains, which alleviate rush-hour congestion on city roads, can be crowded. Electrification of the commuter-rail network has been proposed to improve energy efficiency and sustainability.

=== Train types ===
- Intercity Express: The fastest train type, with few stops. Passengers get special tickets and pay a premium.
- Intercity: Express trains which do limited stop and run to the furthest most points of the country.
- Night Mail: Night-time trains with freight transport, they run to Badulla, Batticaloa, Trincomalee, Kankesanthurai and Galle.
- Express: Links Colombo and major transport hubs, they operate throughout the country.
- Colombo Commuter: Stops at each station on the route and operate in the Colombo region.
- Local Trains: They tend to run in more rural areas and serve smaller stations where Intercity and Express trains wouldn't stop at.
- Mixed Trains: They stop at all stations and carry both passengers and cargo.

=== Routes and Trains ===
SLR divides its network into three operating regions, based in Maradana, Nawalapitya and Anuradhapura. The network consists of nine lines, and several services were named during the 1950s.

	Route	Major trains
Main Line	Colombo Fort to Nawalapitya, Nanu Oya, and Badulla	Udarata Menike, Podi Menike, Tikiri Menike (to Hatton), Senkadagala Menike (to Nawalapitiya), Colombo - Badulla Night Mail Train
Matale line	Peradeniya Junction to Kandy and Matale	

	Route	Major trains
Northern line	Polgahawela Junction to Kurunegala, Anuradhapura, Jaffna and Kankesanthurai	Yal Devi, Rajarata Rejini Jaffna night mail, Jaffna intercity
Mannar line	Medawachchi Junction to Mannar and Talaimannar	
Batticaloa line	Maho Junction to Polonnaruwa and Batticaloa	Udaya Devi, Meena Gaya
Trincomalee line	Gal Oya Junction to Kantale and Trincomalee	

	Route	Major trains
Coastal line	Colombo Fort to Galle, Matara and Beliatta; Beliatta to Kataragama under construction	Ruhunu Kumari, Samudra Devi, Galu Kumari, Sagarika, Rajarata Rejini, Dakshina intercity
Kelani Valley line	Colombo Maradana to Avissawella	Seethawaka Odyssey
Puttalam line	Ragama to Noor Nagar (Puttalam)	Muthu Kumari, Puttalam mixed and express trains, Chilaw express

== Planned high-speed rail ==
High Speed Railway Corporation (HSRC) plans to introduce a maglev system to the island with a line connecting Negombo and Colombo 3.

== Planned extension to Hambantota ==
Sri Lanka Railways is planning to restore the Kelaniya Valley Line up to Opanayake through Kuruvita, Ratnapura and Kahawatta and to augment the line with a broad gauge via Embilipitiya and Suriyawewa to the port of Hambantota by 2030.

== Links to India ==
A proposal to link the railways of Sri Lanka and India did not materialise, but a combined train-ferry-train service (known as Indo-Ceylon Boat Mail Express) connected Colombo with Chennai for much of the twentieth century. A 35 km (22 miles) bridge linking the countries was proposed in 1894 by the consultant engineer for railways in Madras (Chennai); a blueprint and cost analysis were made. The Mannar line was built by 1914 to connect Talaimannar on Mannar Island to the Sri Lankan mainland, and the Indian rail network was extended to Dhanushkodi; however, the bridge linking them was not built. India-Sri Lanka rail connectivity proposal entails 40 km rail link which requires construction of a 23 km long over-water rail bridge parallel to Ram Setu to connect the existing Talaimannar Pier railway station on Mannar line in Sri Lanka with the Dhanushkodi railway station in India. The plans for restoration of a further 17 km of Dhanushkodi-Rameswaram rail line in India, which was destroyed in cyclone, from Dhanushkodi railway station till New Pamban Bridge, have been approved but facing delays due to environmental and other clearances pending with the Government of Tamil Nadu as of April 2025.

Ferry service connecting the railheads at Talaimannar and Dhanushkodi lasted until the 1960s, when a cyclone destroyed the pier and rail line in Dhanushkodi. Ferry service resumed from the Indian terminus at Rameshwaram until the Sri Lankan Civil War. A rail bridge (or tunnel) was proposed again during the 2000s, highlighting the benefits of connecting the ports of Colombo and Trincomalee with Chennai.

== Urban rail ==
=== Colombo Commuter ===
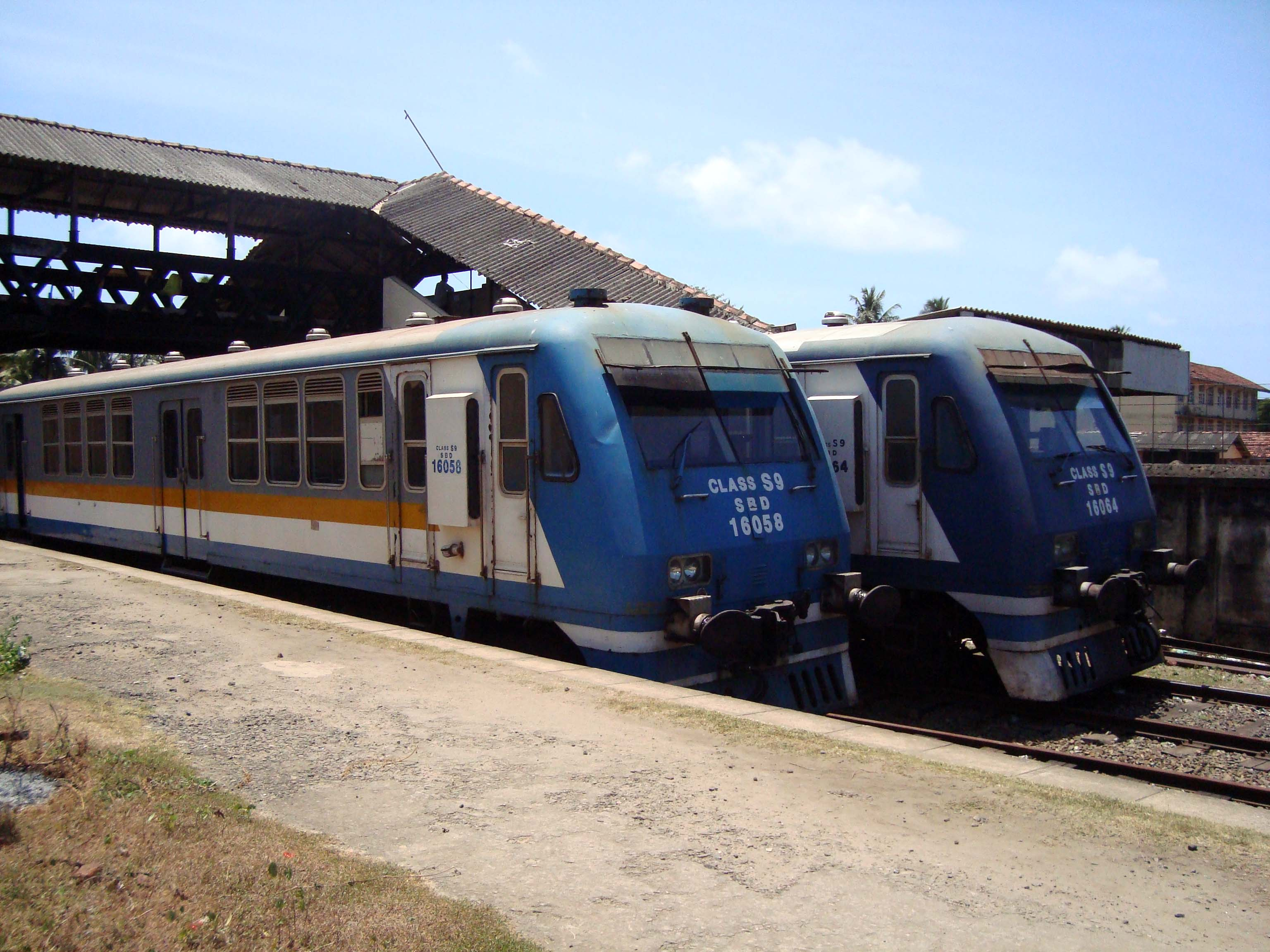
Commuter trains

Commuter rail service connects Colombo to its suburbs, helping alleviate rush-hour congestion on city roads. Local commuter trains and intercity lines use the same tracks. Colombo's commuter-rail network is 100 kilometres (62 mi) of track from Panadura to Polgahawela via the Fort and Maradana stations. The route is multi-tracked to provide rush-hour service. Electrification of the commuter-rail network has been proposed to improve energy efficiency and sustainability.

=== Metro ===
A 1,435 mm (4 ft 8 1/2 in) standard-gauge metro system was proposed during the 2010s to give Colombo commuters a clean, environmentally-friendly transit option. The metro would reduce the load on the commuter-rail system and alleviate congestion on major roads. A consortium of three companies is conducting feasibility studies on the project.

=== Light Rail ===
Colombo Light Rail has received $1.25 billion in funding.

=== Railbus ===
In areas with little demand for commuter trains railbuses are used. Railbus services exist between Batticaloa and Trincomalee, via Gal Oya. Railbuses are used to connect Kandy with Peradeniya, and also on the Kelani Valley line in Colombo.

=== Former Tram ===
A tram system operated in Colombo from 1899 to 1960, operated by Colombo Electric Tramways and Lighting Company before being transferred to the Colombo Municipal Council on 31 August 1944.

== Private railways ==
The state-owned Sri Lanka Railways operates nearly all of the country's rail services, but few private railways have existed at various times. The Viceroy Special heritage train and steam locomotive was introduced in 1986 and is still advertised as of early 2024.

Expolanka introduced its ExpoRail service on 6 October 2011, which is no longer in operation. The Rajadhani Express was introduced by Blue Line Express on 6 October 2011 but ceased operations due to the COVID-19 pandemic.

== Incidents ==
- 18 March 1964 - Night Mail Express arriving from Mannar bound for Colombo derailed at high speed, killing over 60 people near Mirigama.
- 19 January 1985 - the LTTE bombed the Yal Devi, killing 11 civilians.
- 24 July 1996 - The LTTE bombed a train, resulting in 70 civilian deaths at Dehiwala.
- 19 August 2001 - A train derailed between Alawwa and Rambukkana due to high speed and overcrowding, killing 46.
- 13 June 2002 - A train derailed entering the Alawwa railway station, killing 14.
- 26 December 2004 - 2004 tsunami rail disaster - Over 1,700 people died in the world's largest rail disaster (by death toll) when a train was overwhelmed by the Indian Ocean earthquake and tsunami at Peraliya.
- 26 April 2005 - Polgahawela level crossing accident - A bus trying to pass another bus at a level crossing in Yangalmodara (near Polgahawela) was struck by a train; 37 bus passengers died.

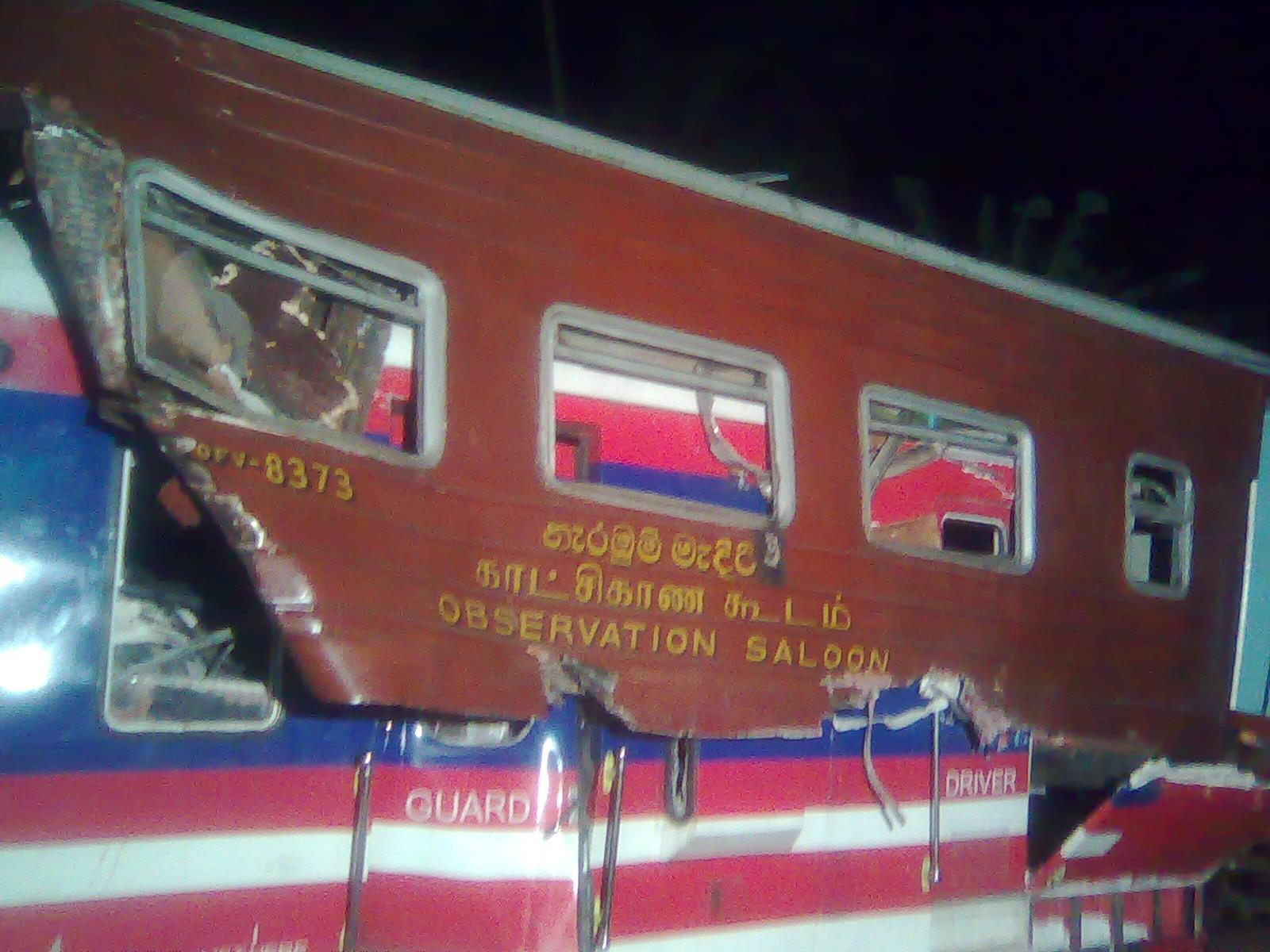
2011 Alawwa accident

- 17 September 2011 - An S11 passenger train struck the stopped Colombo-Kandy Udarata Manike at the Alawwa railway station. Five people were killed and over 30 were injured.
- 17 May 2012 - After a train struck a stopped train, two trains collided between the Wandurawa and Keenawala stations in Veyangoda.
- 30 April 2014 - A northbound intercity express collided with the Colombo-bound Rajarata Rajina at Pothuhera, injuring 68 passengers.
- 1 February 2022 - Four of same family dead as three-wheeler fatally collides with Rajarata Rajina at Rillamba Junction in Boossa.

== See also ==
- List of railway stations in Sri Lanka
- Ceylon Railway Engineer Corps
- National railway museum, Kadugannawa
