= Podi Menike =

Sri Lankan passenger train

Podi Manike
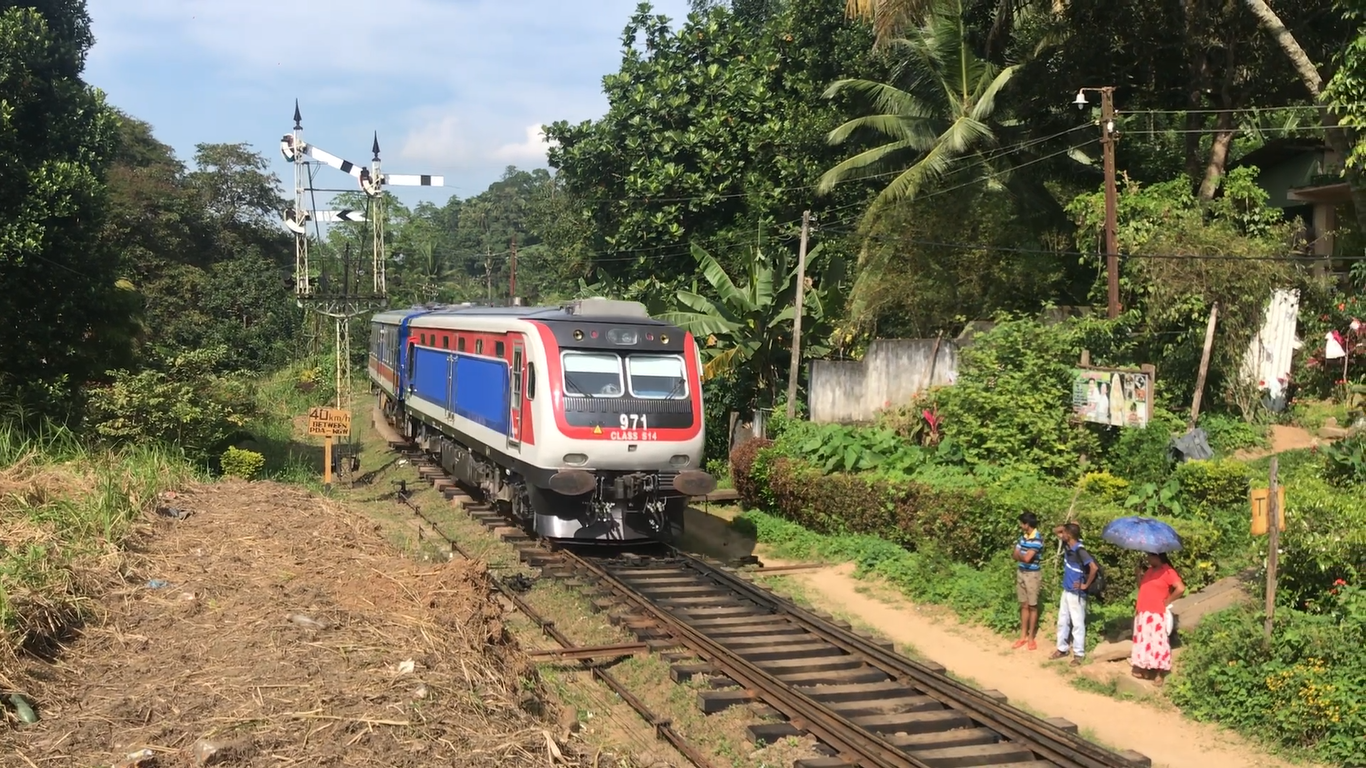
- Sri Lanka Railways S14

Overview
- Service type: Inter-city rail
- Status: Running
- Locale: Sri Lanka
- Current operator: Sri Lanka Railways
- Former operator: Ceylon Government Railway

Route
- Termini: Colombo Fort; Badulla
- Distance travelled: 290 km (180 mi.)
- Average journey time: 05.55 AM From Colombo Fort, reaches Badulla at 16:06
- Service frequency: Daily
- Train numbers: 1005 (Colombo Fort-Badulla); 1006 (Badulla-Colombo Fort)

On-board services
- Classes: Air Conditioned First Class; Second Class; Second Class Reserved; Economy Class
- Observation facilities: Not available

Technical
- Track gauge: 5 ft 6 in (1,676 mm)
- Operating speed: 120 kmph
- Track owner: Sri Lanka Railways
- Timetable numbers: 1005 and 1006

"Podi Manike" (Sinhala:පොඩි මැණිකේ, meaning "Little Maiden") is a Sri Lankan passenger train running from Colombo Fort to Badulla. This journey covers about 300 km and is renowned for being the most beautiful train journey in Sri Lanka, especially the stretch from Nanuoya to Ella . It takes about 10 hours to complete the journey.

The train follows the hill-country line, a route developed by the British in the 19th century through scenic mountains. The route features bridges, long tunnels, high slopes and gradients.

== Services ==
The train offers three classes. The first class ac coaches are very luxury and popular among tourists. The train also includes a buffet car.

- 1st class, with air conditioned reserved seats
- 2nd class
- 3rd class, which typically gets very crowded and carries only basic facilities.

== Route ==
The Podi Menike travels the length of Sri Lanka Railways' Main Line through the hill country.

The Podi Menike begins its eastbound service at Colombo Fort Station and runs east and north past Ragama, Gampaha, Veyangoda, and Polgahawela. At Rambukkana, the Main Line begins its steep climb into the hills of the upcountry. Between Balana and Kadugannawa, the track clings to the side of sheer cliffs, offering passengers views of Batalegala ('Bible' Rock). The train then continues its climb through tea country, connecting market centers at Gampola, Nawalapitiya, and Hatton before reaching Nanu-Oya. This is the connection to the former colonial resort of Nuwara Eliya, still visited for its temperate climate, classic hotels, and British-style gardens. The Podi Menike continues its ascent to the summit at Pattipola, 6,226 feet above sea level, before descending past Bandarawela to Badulla Terminus. In the upcountry, passengers have views of the tea gardens, mountains and valleys, cascading torrents and waterfalls.

== Rolling stock ==
=== History ===
A Class M6 Diesel electric locomotive was used in this train. An Observation saloon was attached at the end. Romanian-built ASTRA passenger coaches are used. This service is now carried out by Class Sri Lanka Railways S14 Powersets

=== Present ===
The service was upgraded in 2013, as new long-haul diesel multiple units from China South Locomotive & Rolling Stock Corporation. Now hauled by new S14 luxury powersets with two AC coaches.

== See also ==
- Sri Lanka Railways
- List of named passenger trains of Sri Lanka
