= Sri Lanka Railways S8 =

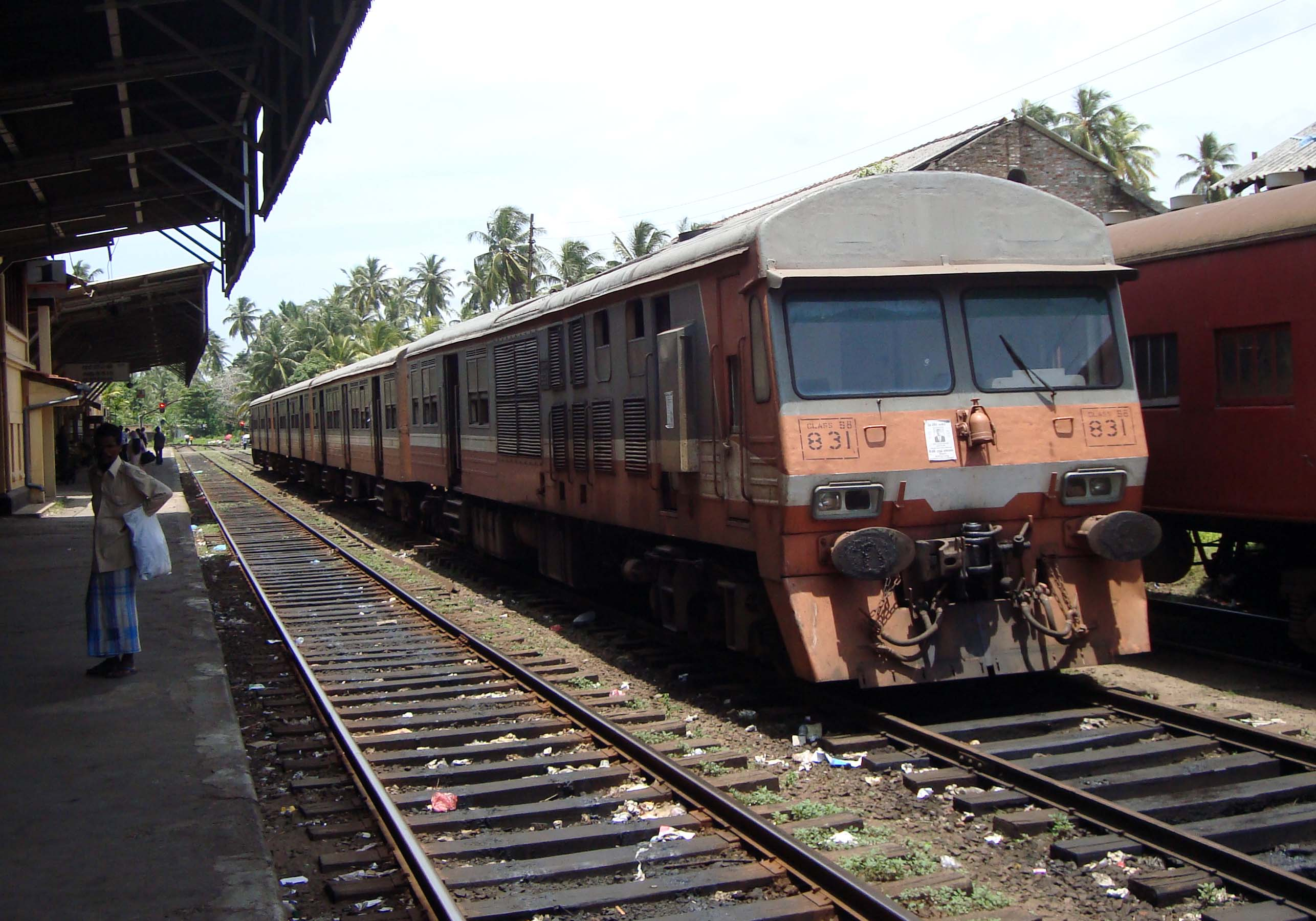
- S8 DMU No. 831
- Stock type: Diesel Multiple Unit
- In service: 1991-present
- Manufacturer: Hitachi
- Constructed: 1991
- Entered service: 1991
- Number built: 20
- Number in service: 20
- Formation: DPC + 4 TC + DTC
- Fleet numbers: 821-840
- Operator: Sri Lanka Railways
- Lines served: Main Line; Kelani Valley Line; Puttalam Line; Coastal Line

Specifications
- Car length: 65 ft (19.81 m)
- Maximum speed: 88 km/h (55 mph)
- Weight: 70 t (69 long tons; 77 short tons)
- Prime mover: MTU 12V396TCI13
- Engine type: V12 diesel
- Power output: 1,430 hp (1,070 kW)
- Transmission: Voith L 520 R U2
- Braking system: Air
- Coupling system: Automatic (dual)
- Multiple working: Yes
- Track gauge: 1,676 mm (5 ft 6 in)

Sri Lanka Railways S8 is a class of Diesel multiple unit (DMU) train set made by Hitachi and Hyundai operated by Sri Lanka Railways. They were imported to Sri Lanka in 1991 and primarily runs on the Kelani Valley Line.

== History ==
This class was introduced 12 years after the previous S7 DMU was imported. 20 train sets were ordered in order to strengthen the DMU fleet of Sri Lanka Railways.

== Technical specifications ==
The Class S8 has four passenger compartments, including a dummy control unit. There are no vestibules between the compartments, giving the DMU a better ability to run through sharp curves such as those on the Kelani Valley Line.

The complete S8 DMU has a total axle load of 17,500 kilograms (38,600 lb).

Owing to the high power of the engine, this DMU has a higher acceleration rate and also can be used for multiple unit working. The Class S8 only has third class accommodations as it is primarily used for commuter services.

Formations
Formation	Number of Cars	Key
DPC + 4 TC + DTC	6	DPC - Driving Power Car; TC - Trailer Car; DTC - Driving Trailer Car (Dummy Car)

== Operations ==
Multiple S8 units are used in peak hours. These are mostly used for short-distance commuter services. The lines operated using the Class S8 are as follows:

Line	Starting Station	Key Stations	Terminus Station
Main Line	Colombo Fort	Polgahawela	Rambukkana
Kelani Valley Line	Colombo Fort		Avissawella
Puttalam Line	Colombo Fort		Puttalam
Coastal Line	Colombo Fort		Aluthgama

== Incidents ==
- In 1991, a service train and a S8 DMU collided together, and the Dummy Unit of the DMU was destroyed.
- In 1998, due to a derailment with Canadian-built Class M2 Montreal, another Dummy Unit of a S8 DMU was destroyed.

== Gallery ==
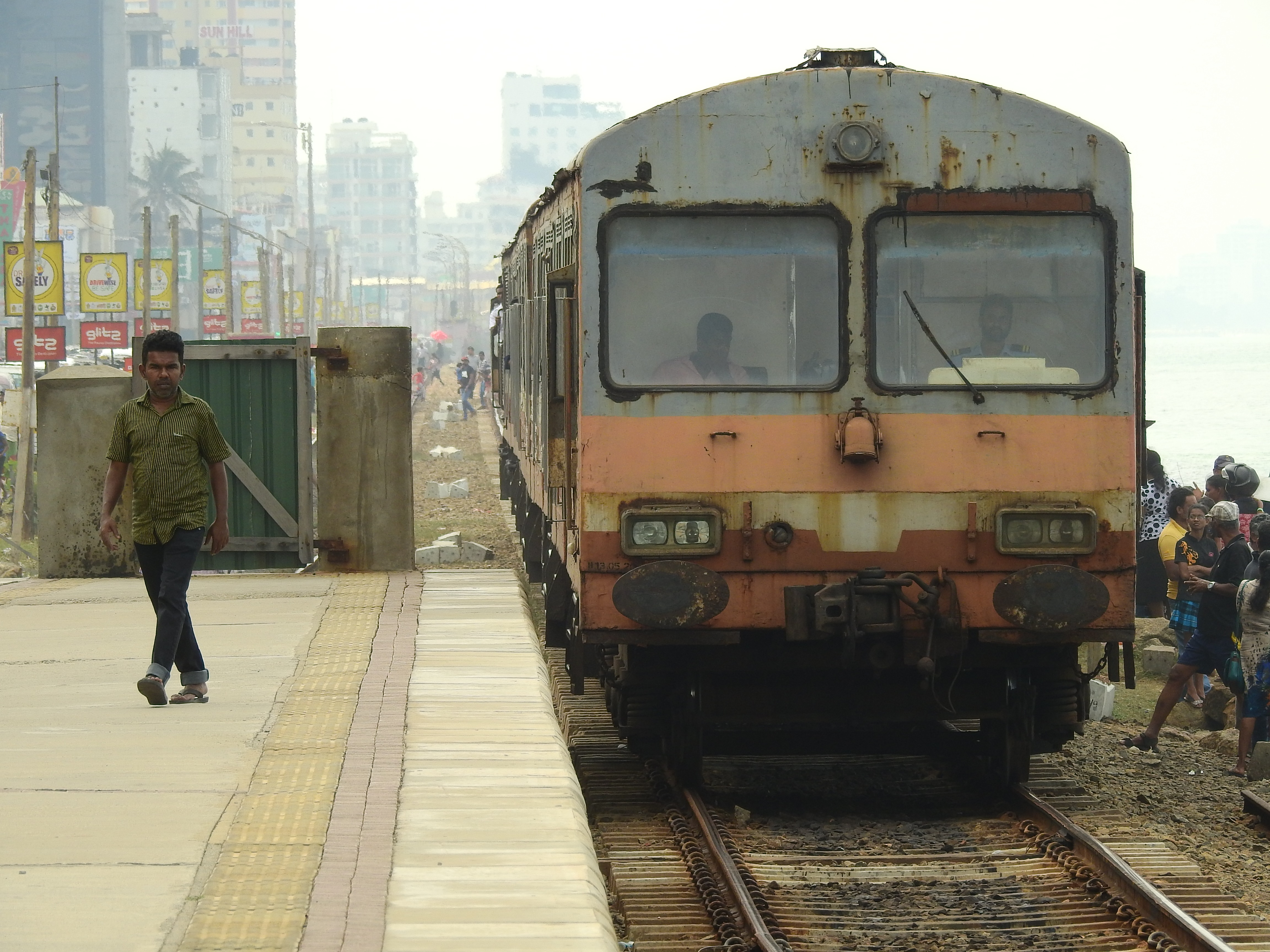

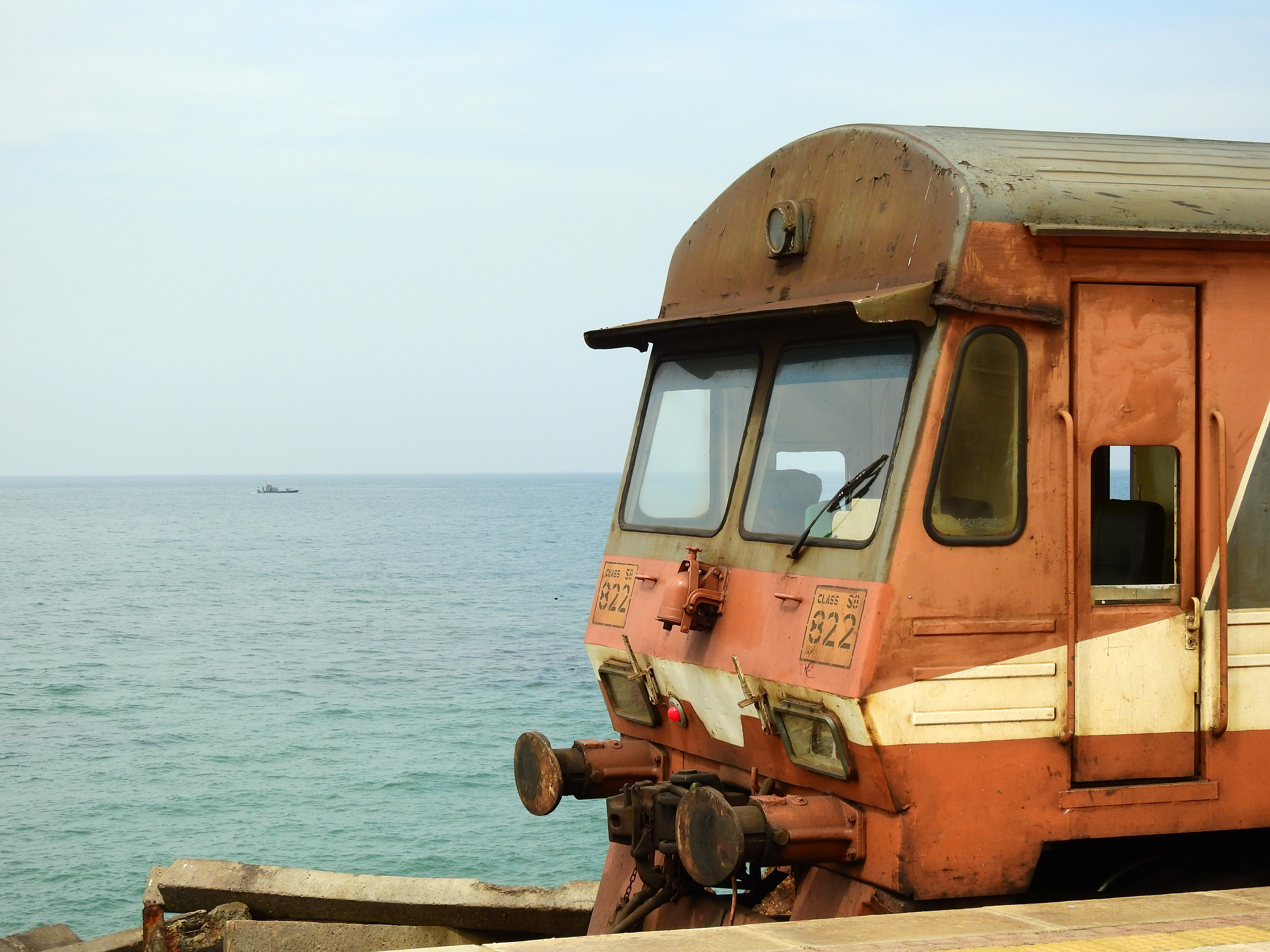

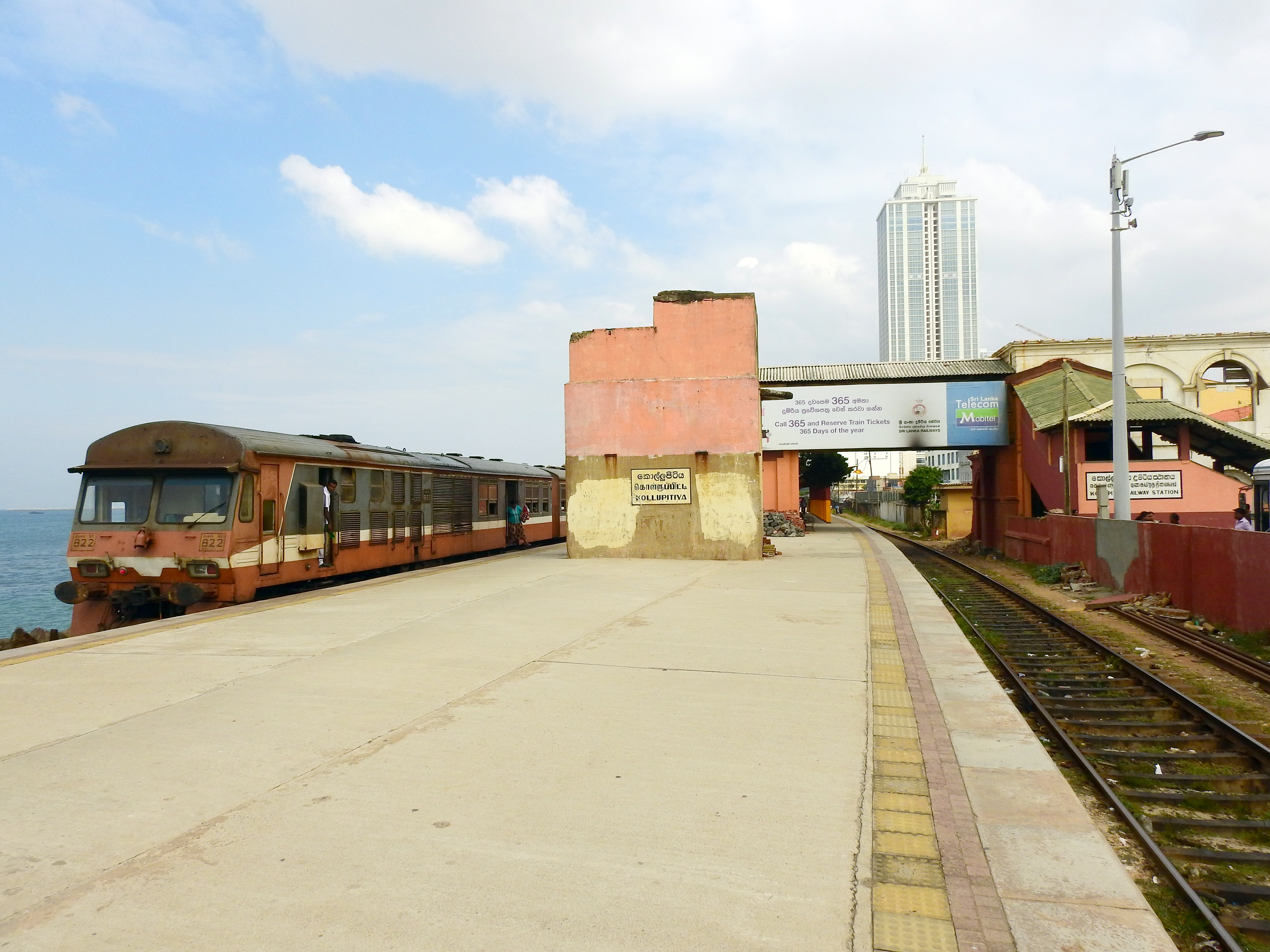
