= Kottawa =

Kottawa: කොට්ටාව (Sinhala); கொட்டாவை (Tamil)
- Suburb
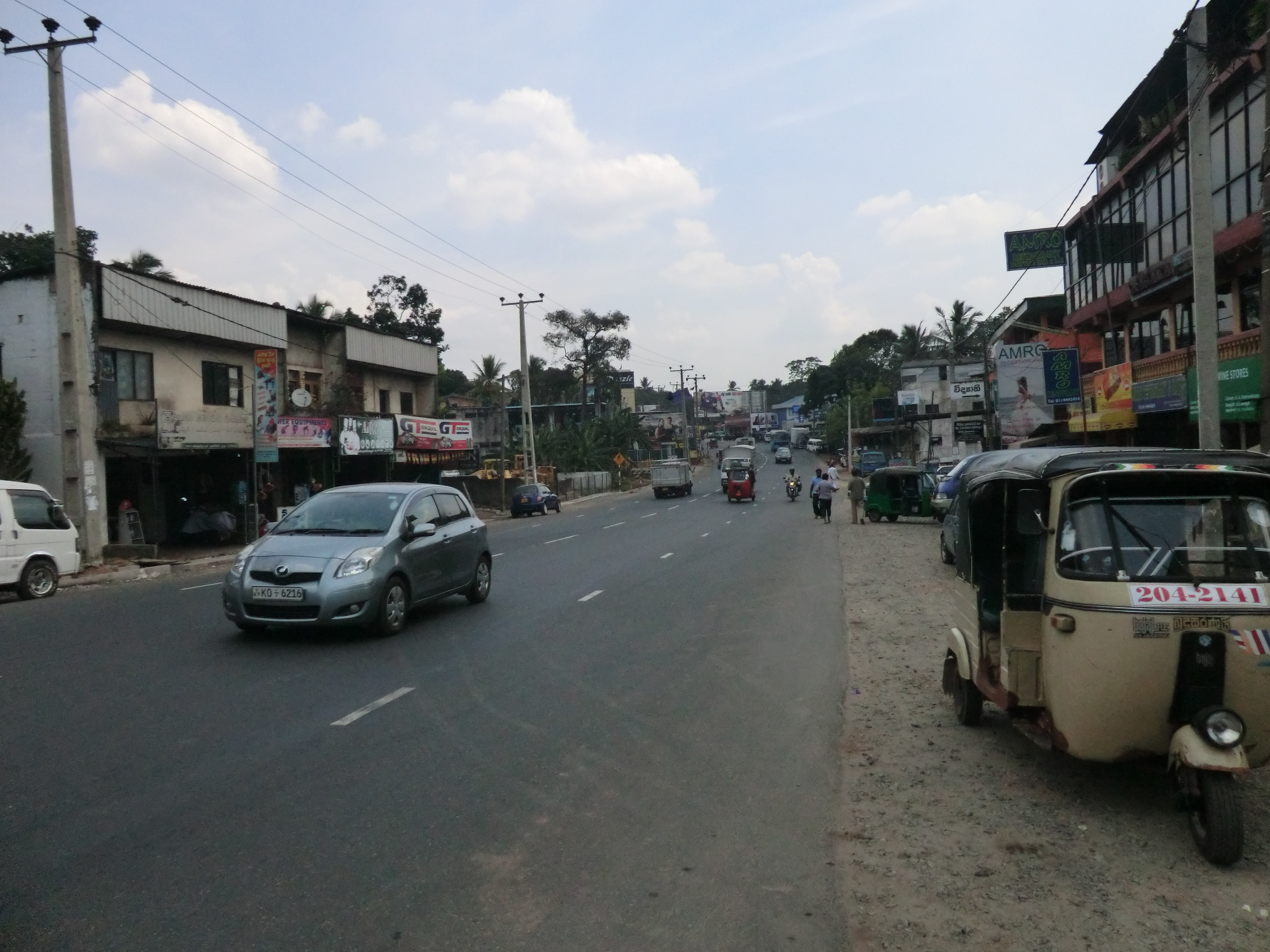

- Location of Kottawa within Colombo District
- Coordinates: 6°50′29″N 79°57′53″E
- Country: Sri Lanka
- Province: Western Province
- District: Colombo District

Population (2020)
  - Total: 5,064
- Demonym: Kottawist
- Time zone: UTC+5:30 (Sri Lanka Standard Time Zone)
- Postal Code: 10230

Kottawa (Sinhala: කොට්ටාව, Tamil: கொட்டாவை) is one of the main suburbs in Colombo, Sri Lanka and is administered by the Maharagama Urban Council. It is located 21 km (13 mi) from the centre of Colombo. It is a five-way junction and lies as the epicenter for Maharagama road, Homagama road, Piliyandala road, Malabe road and Borella road.

== History ==
The name Kottawa might be derived from the Sinhalese phrase kotten awa, meaning "just arrived from Kotte" and later the name was shortened to "Kottawa". Another contemporary opinion is that it's the "city of the great one". The town was part of the Kottawa Electoral District which existed between 1960 and 1977 and has been identified as one of the main transportation hubs of Colombo. Kottawa comprises five grama niladhari divisions: north, south, east, west and city.

During the Sri Lankan Civil War, Kottawa's strategic location on one of the main roads connecting Panagoda Cantonment to Colombo made it a target for attacks. In 2004, 7 alleged Tamil Makkal Viduthalai Pulikal militants were killed in a pre-dawn attack blamed on the Liberation Tigers of Tamil Eelam. In June 2006, Major General Parami Kulatunga was killed by a suicide bomber just after passing Kottawa on his way to the Army Headquarters in Colombo from his residence in Panagoda.

== Economy ==
Kottawa is a commercial hub with several banks, shops, supermarkets, a post office, bakeries and fuel depots. As a commuter suburb of Colombo, Kottawa has seen land prices increase twenty five to thirty two per cent in recent times, with the average price per perch being between LKR 700,000–1 million.

== Culture ==
The Kottawa United Traders Association constructs a pandal for the Vesak festival at the centre of town. This has been an annual event since 1988.

== Education ==
There are several schools located in Kottawa:

- Kottawa Dharmapala Maha Vidyalaya
- Ananda Vidyalaya, Kottawa
- Kottawa North Dharmapala Vidyalaya
- Vidyadana Maha Vidyalaya
- Vijayagosha Vidyalaya
- Madduma Bandara Kanishta Vidyalaya

== Law enforcement ==
Kottawa is served by the Kottawa Police Station. In 2010, the artist Lalaka Peiris was found dead after arrest here.

== Climate ==
Kottawa displays a tropical climate. Highest temperatures are usually recorded in March and April; while the lowest temperatures are usually recorded in December, January and February. The atmospheric pressure in Kottawa is around 1.010 bar, while the wind speeds range from 8 to 16 Kilometres per hour.

Climate data for Kottawa
Month	Jan	Feb	Mar	Apr	May	Jun	Jul	Aug	Sep	Oct	Nov	Dec	Year
Mean daily maximum °C (°F)	30.3 (86.5)	31.2 (88.2)	31.4 (88.5)	31.4 (88.5)	30.3 (86.5)	29.2 (84.6)	28.8 (83.8)	28.6 (83.5)	28.9 (84.0)	29.7 (85.5)	30.3 (86.5)	29.7 (85.5)	31.4 (88.5)
Daily mean °C (°F)	27.0 (80.6)	27.5 (81.5)	28.8 (83.8)	28.6 (83.5)	28.5 (83.3)	28.1 (82.6)	27.7 (81.9)	27.5 (81.5)	27.6 (81.7)	27.8 (82.0)	27.4 (81.3)	27.2 (81.0)	27.5 (81.5)
Mean daily minimum °C (°F)	23.3 (73.9)	23.5 (74.3)	24.8 (76.6)	26.0 (78.8)	26.4 (79.5)	26.1 (79.0)	25.5 (77.9)	25.5 (77.9)	25.2 (77.4)	25.4 (77.7)	24.7 (76.5)	24.1 (75.4)	23.3 (73.9)
Mean monthly sunshine hours	285	282	282	279	270	254	239	223	232	242	205	217	3,010
Source: "Climate and monthly weather forecast of Kottawa, Sri Lanka". weather-atlas.com.

== Infrastructure ==
Kottawa town is located alongside the A4 highway connecting Colombo and Batticaloa. Kottawa town shows a potential to become a key landmark in Sri Lanka's road systems due to the development of the Expressways of Sri Lanka. The Kottawa - Makumbura multimodal transport centre allows commuters to switch between Expressway buses, the Kelani Valley Railway Line and buses running on the A4 highway.

=== Road ===
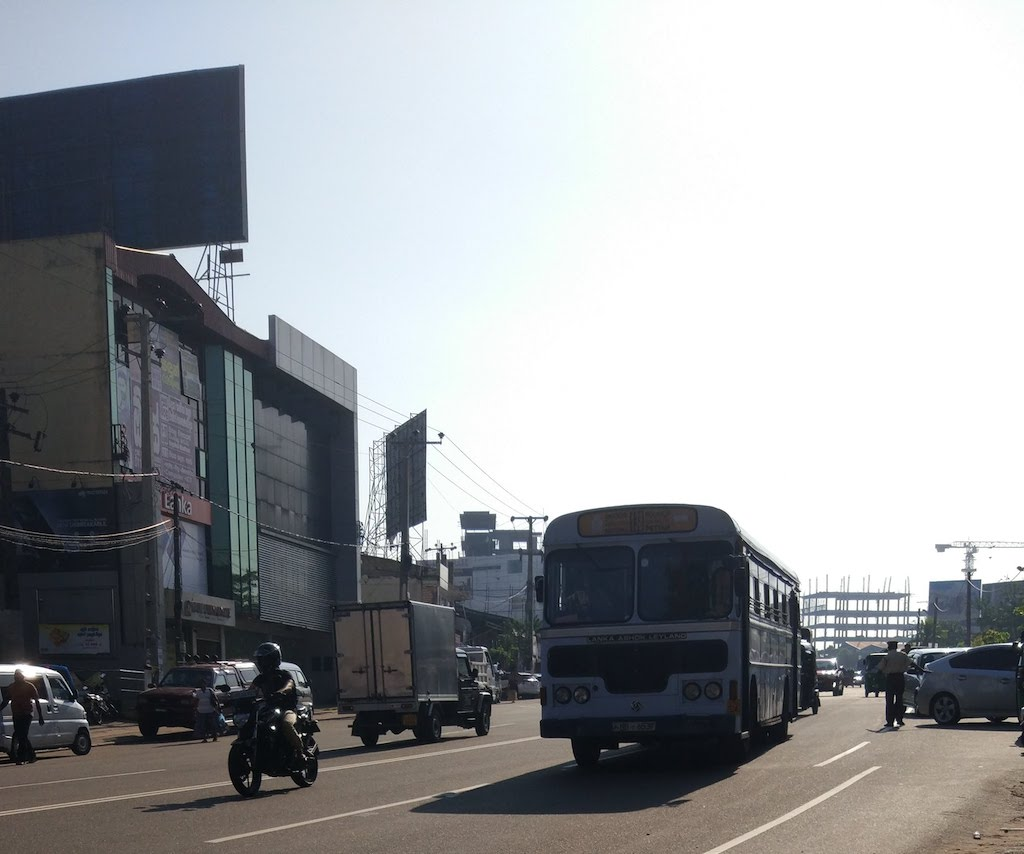
A bus passes through Kottawa on the A4 Highway

Kottawa can be reached via A4 (Colombo - Batticaloa) highway. The northern end of the Southern Expressway is about 2 km (1.2 mi) east of Kottawa on the High Level Road (A4) and the Outer Colombo Circular Highway also extends from here towards north.

In December 2021, area residents protested delays and irregularities in the construction of the Kottawa–Piliyandala road.

==== Bus routes ====
- 99 - Colombo (Pettah) – Badulla / Passara / Welimada / Lunugala / Bibila
- 122 - Pettah – Avissawella / Rathnapura / Embilipitiya
- 124 - Maharagama – Ihala bope
- 125 - Pettah / Maharagama – Padukka / Ingiriya
- 128 - Kottawa – Kiriwaththuduwa / Yakahaluwa
- 128/1 - Maharagama – Munamalewatta
- 129 - Kottawa – Moragahahena
- 138 - Pettah – Kottawa / Homagama / Maharagama / Mattegoda / Rukmalgama / Athurugiriya / Diyagama
- 138/2 - Pettah – Mattegoda
- 138/3 - Pettah – Rukmalgama
- 138/4 - Pettah – Athurugiriya
- 174 - Kottawa – Borella
- 255 - Kottawa – Mount Lavinia
- 280 - Maharagama – Horana
- 296 - Kottawa – Piliyandala
- 342 - Kottawa – Piliyandala (via Polgasowita)
- 336 - Kottawa – Malabe
- 336/1 - Kottawa – Malabe (via Horahena)
- E01 - Maharagama – Galle / Matara

=== Rail ===
Kottawa Railway Station is located on the Kelani Valley Railway Line (which connects Colombo to Avissawella). It is situated approximately 200 m (660 ft) from Kottawa Junction along the Kottawa-Athurugiriya Road

Kottawa has been included in the proposal for elevated commuter rail lines serving the Colombo metropolitan area. An elevated track named "Neela" (Blue), 23 km (14 mi) in length, will connect Hunupitiya to Kottawa via Pelawatte. The Public-Private Partnership (PPP) project aims to address heavy traffic congestion during the morning and evening rush hours in Colombo.

== Architecture and housing ==
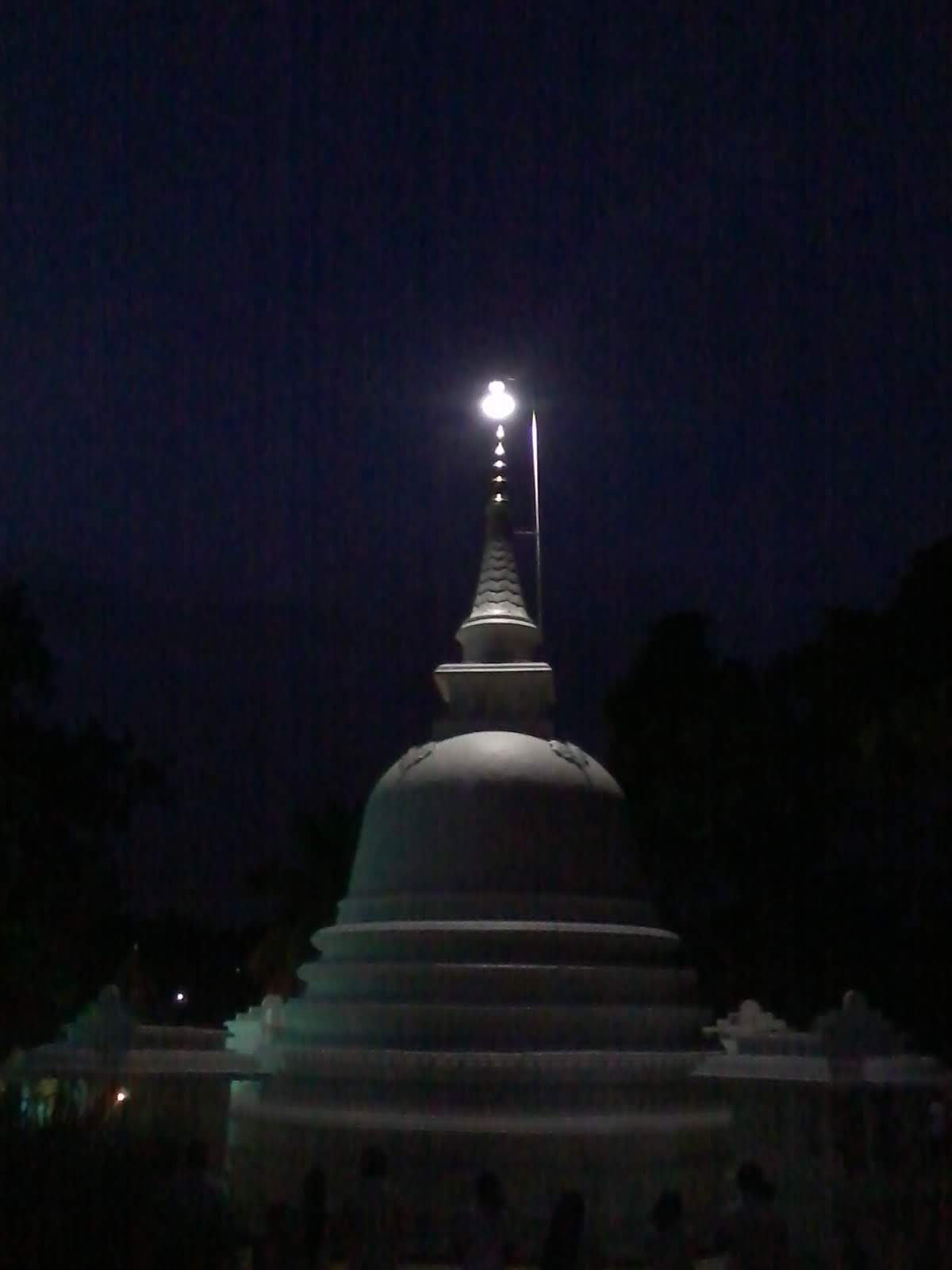
The stupa of the Digana Purana Rajamaha Viharaya, Kottawa seen at night

Kottawa is home to several renowned Buddhist temples, including Digana Purana Rajamaha Viharaya and Pinhena Temple.

Two middle-income housing projects have been initiated by the Urban Development Authority in the Kottawa area. They are Kottawa Green Arcade Apartments in Kulasevana Watte on Hokandara Road, and the Viyathpura Housing Complex in Weera Mawatha. These are scheduled to be completed in June 2022 and consist of 300 housing units and parking spaces for each of the units.

== Notable landmarks and sights ==
- Kottawa nursing home
- Kottawa kulasewana public library
- Digana purana rajamaha viharaya
- Great Kottawa zebra crossing
