= Kandana =

Kandana කඳාන கந்தானை
- Suburb
- Location within Sri Lanka
- Coordinates: 7°03′N 79°54′E
- Country: Sri Lanka
- Province: Western Province
- Postal code: 11320

Kandana (Sinhala: කඳාන, Tamil: கந்தானை) is a suburb of Gampaha in Western Province, Sri Lanka, 19 km (12 mi) north of the Colombo city centre. Due to the proximity to Negombo as well as the Bandaranaike International Airport, the suburb is a popular residential area. The neighboring suburbs are Ja-Ela, Ragama, Peralanda and Wattala.

== Transport ==
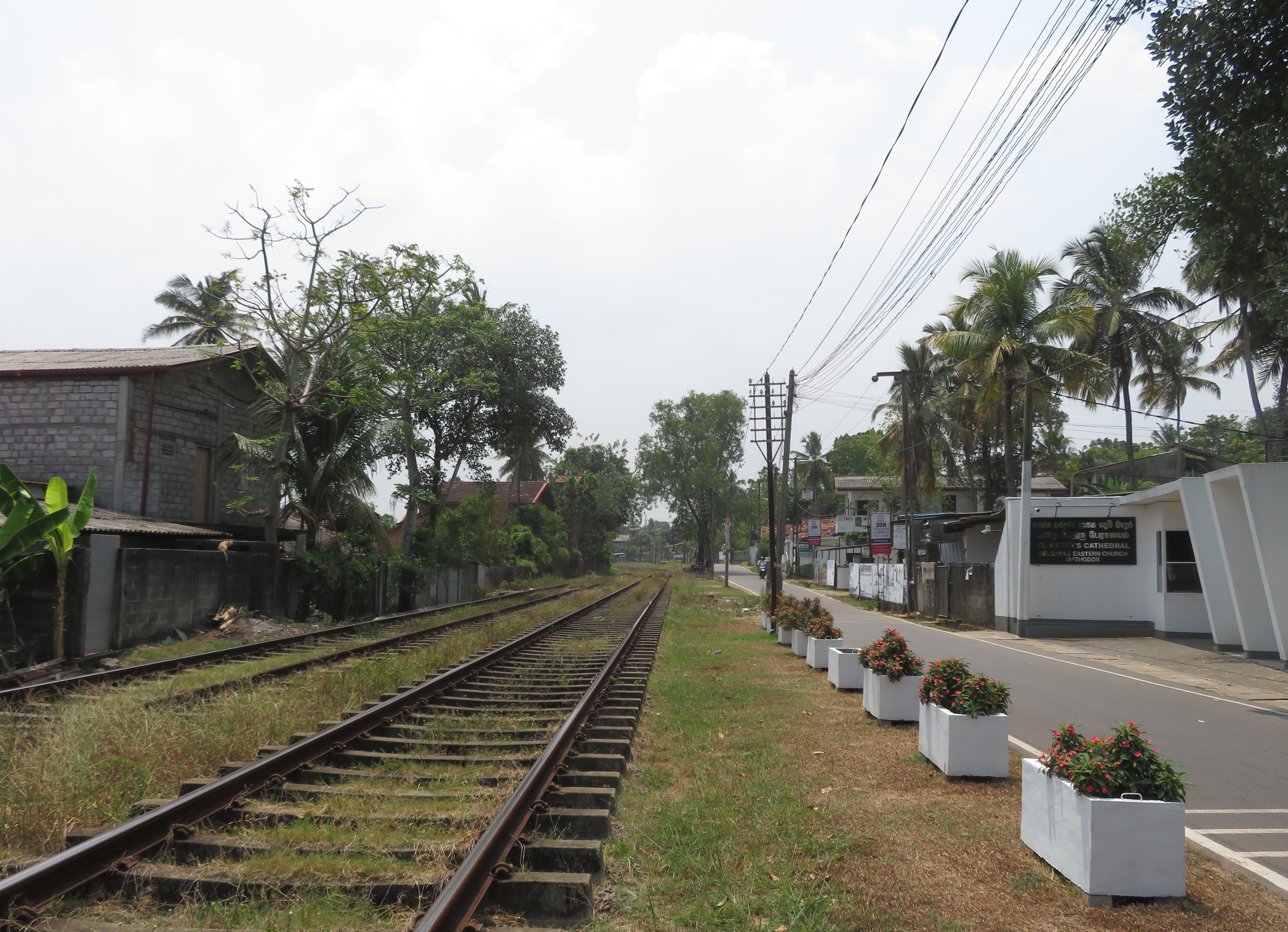
Puttalam line in Kandana

Kandana is situated on the A3 (Colombo - Negombo) Highway.

The Kandana Railway Station is located on the Puttalam line, and is the 10th railway station from Colombo Fort railway station with a distance of 18.829 km (11.700 mi) from Colombo Fort railway station.

== Demographic ==
The major ethnic group in Kandana are Sinhalese and most residents of Kandana are Roman Catholic. The St. Sebastian's Shrine in Kandana is a well-known Roman Catholic place of worship. Many Catholic churches are situated in and around Kandana. Historically, Kandana has had a large Burgher (Dutch, Portuguese and British ancestry) population, however, the number of Burghers has decreased throughout the years.

== Industries ==
Kandana is home to the Swadeshi Industrial Works, a leading soap manufacturing company established in 1941, as well as to many small scale industries. The town is also famous for its bakeries and restaurants.

== Education ==
- St. Sebastian's College Kandana
- De Mazenod College
- Lakphana College kandana
