= Sri Lanka Railways M2 =

Diesel-electric locomotive class

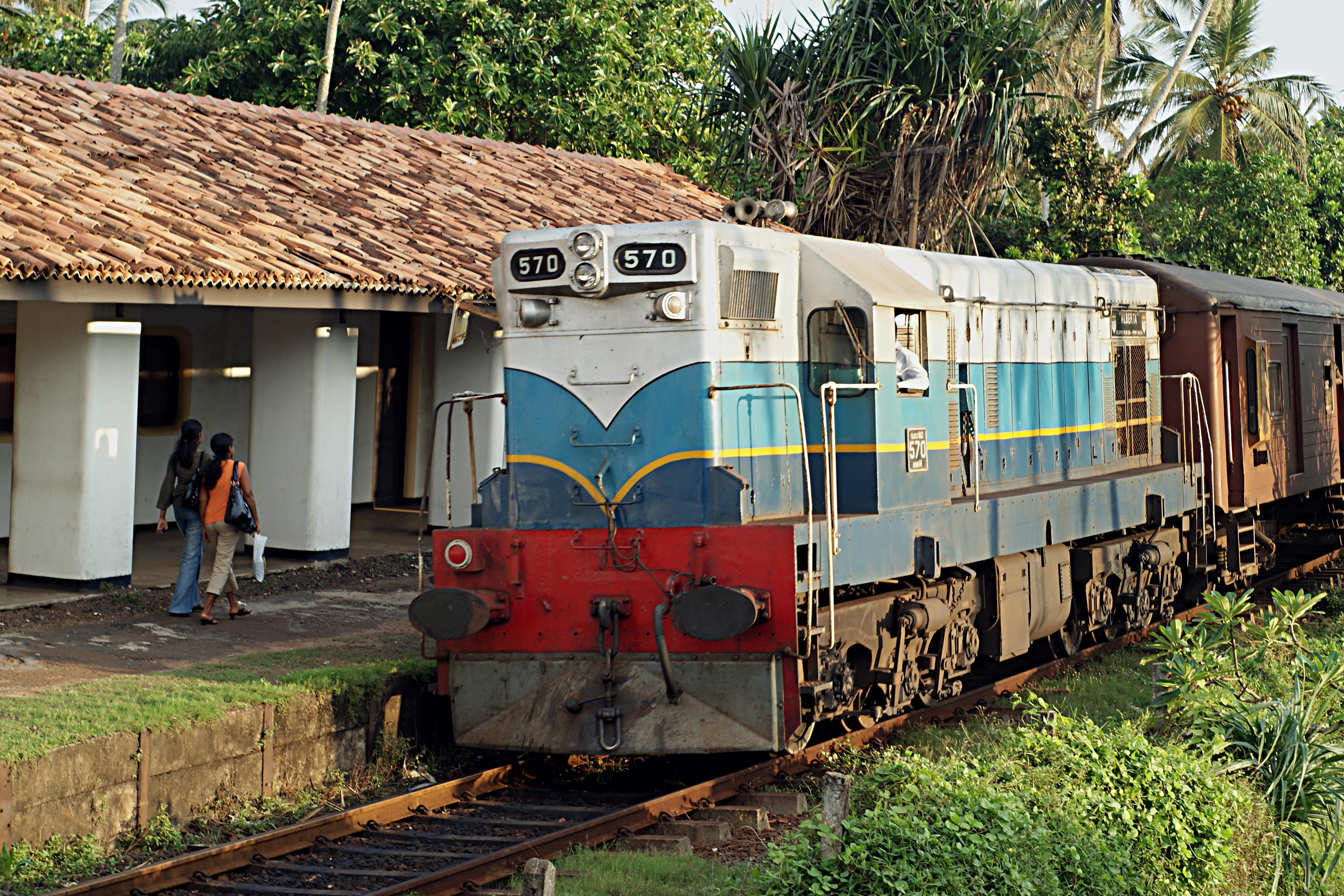
- M2 #570 Alberta at Bentota Halt, November 2009
Type and origin
- Power type: Diesel-electric
- Builder: General Motors Diesel, Canada (12); Electro-Motive Division, USA (2)
- Serial number: A608–A609, A720–722, A894–A896, A1325–1326, A1920–A921, 31211–31212
- Model: EMD G12
- Build date: 1954–1966
- Total produced: 14 (now 13 in running condition)
Specifications
- Configuration
  - UIC: (A1A)(A1A); Bo′Bo′ (M2c sub class)
- Gauge: 5 ft 6 in (1,676 mm)
- Axle load: 19.75 t (19.44 long tons; 21.77 short tons)
- Loco weight: 79 t (78 long tons; 87 short tons)
- Fuel type: Diesel
- Prime mover: EMD 567C
- Engine type: V12 Two-stroke diesel
- Cylinders: 12
- Loco brake: Vacuum (Dynamic on M2c and M2d sub classes)
Performance figures
- Maximum speed: 112 km/h (70 mph)
- Power output: 1,425 hp (1,063 kW); 1,310 hp (980 kW) in M2d sub class
Career
- Operators: Ceylon Government Railway » Sri Lanka Railways
- Class: M2
- Number in class: 14 (includes M2-5, M2a-3, M2b-2, M2c-2, M2d-2)
- Numbers: See table
- Official name: See table
- First run: 1954
- Colombo Plan Aid: Number 571 "Saskatchewan" was destroyed by a terrorist's bomb.; Number 570 "Alberta" hauled the last "Yal Devi" train to Kankasanthurei. After the civil war began it was trapped there. Later it was dismantled and shipped to Colombo. In 2014 it was damaged in the Pothuhera train accident. Repaired and back in use.; Number 591 "Manitoba" was damaged due to tsunami waves on 26 December 2004. Now in use.

The Sri Lanka Railways M2 is a class of diesel-electric locomotive that was developed in 1954 by General Motors Diesel, Canada, and Electro-Motive Division, US for the use in Sri Lanka Railways. It is considered as one of the most successful locomotives in Sri Lanka.

It is a General Motors Diesel (Canada) EMD G12 model using the EMD 567C, 1,425-horsepower (1,063 kW) engine.

== Description ==
=== Introduction ===
From 1954, several batches of General Motors-manufactured locomotives were imported to Sri Lanka under "The Colombo Plan". Locally called a "Canadian" engine – there are actually two classes of Canadian Locomotives in Sri Lankan Railways; the other one is Class M4. Since these locomotives were imported under grants from the Canadian government, class M2 locomotives are named with Canadian province and city names. Out of the 14 locomotives, the last two locomotives; No. 628 and No. 629, were made in the United States and delivered to the Cement Corporation, Sri Lanka, but they were later integrated in Sri Lanka Railways' locomotive fleet. They were named after two local cities – Kankesanthurai and Galle – where the cement factories were located in these respective cities.

The first five of the 14 Locomotives were officially handed over to the Government of Sri Lanka in December 1954 at a ceremony attended by Prime Minister Sir John Kotelawala and Chief Mechanical Engineer B. D. Rampala.

Class M2 locomotives are classified into five sub-classes, delivered in batches in 1954, 1958, 1959, 1961, and 1966.

=== Entering into service and the Three Sisters ===
Class M2 Locomotives entered service in January 1955. In 1955, the Government of Sri Lanka introduced three main luxury express passenger trains originating from Colombo to Matara, Jaffna and Badulla. Due their female names, they were locally known as the Three Sisters.

- On 24 October 1955, 572 British Columbia hauled the inaugural Colombo-Matara Ruhunu Kumari Express, the first long-distance luxury passenger service in Sri Lanka.
- On 23 April 1956, the first Colombo-Jaffna Yarl Devi Express was hauled by Class M2 569 Ontario locomotive.
- On 23 April 1956, the first Colombo-Badulla Udarata Menike Express was hauled by Class M2 572 British Columbia locomotive.

Other than these trains, Class M2s hauled many important passenger, freight and oil trains. Their introduction saw an increase in efficiency and comfort of Sri Lanka Railways in 1960s, which was known as the Golden Age of Sri Lanka Railways.

=== Subclasses ===
Sub Class	Builder	Weight	Specifications	Axle Arrangement	Year	No.of Locomotives	No's
M2A	General Motors Diesel	79 tonnes	GM V12 G12-567c	A1A-A1A	1959	3	591, 592, 593
M2B	General Motors Diesel	79 tonnes	GM V12 G12-567c	A1A-A1A	1958	2	594, 595
M2C	General Motors Diesel	79 tonnes	GM V12 G12-567c	Bo-Bo	1961	2	626, 627
M2D	Electro-Motive Division	79 tonnes	GM V12 G12-567e	A1A-A1A	1966	2	628, 629

=== In service ===
From the 1950s, Class M2 locomotives has been used in both passenger and freight trains on Sri Lanka's railways for over 60 years. Despite the introduction of more modern types of traction, as of 2024, a significant number are still in use.

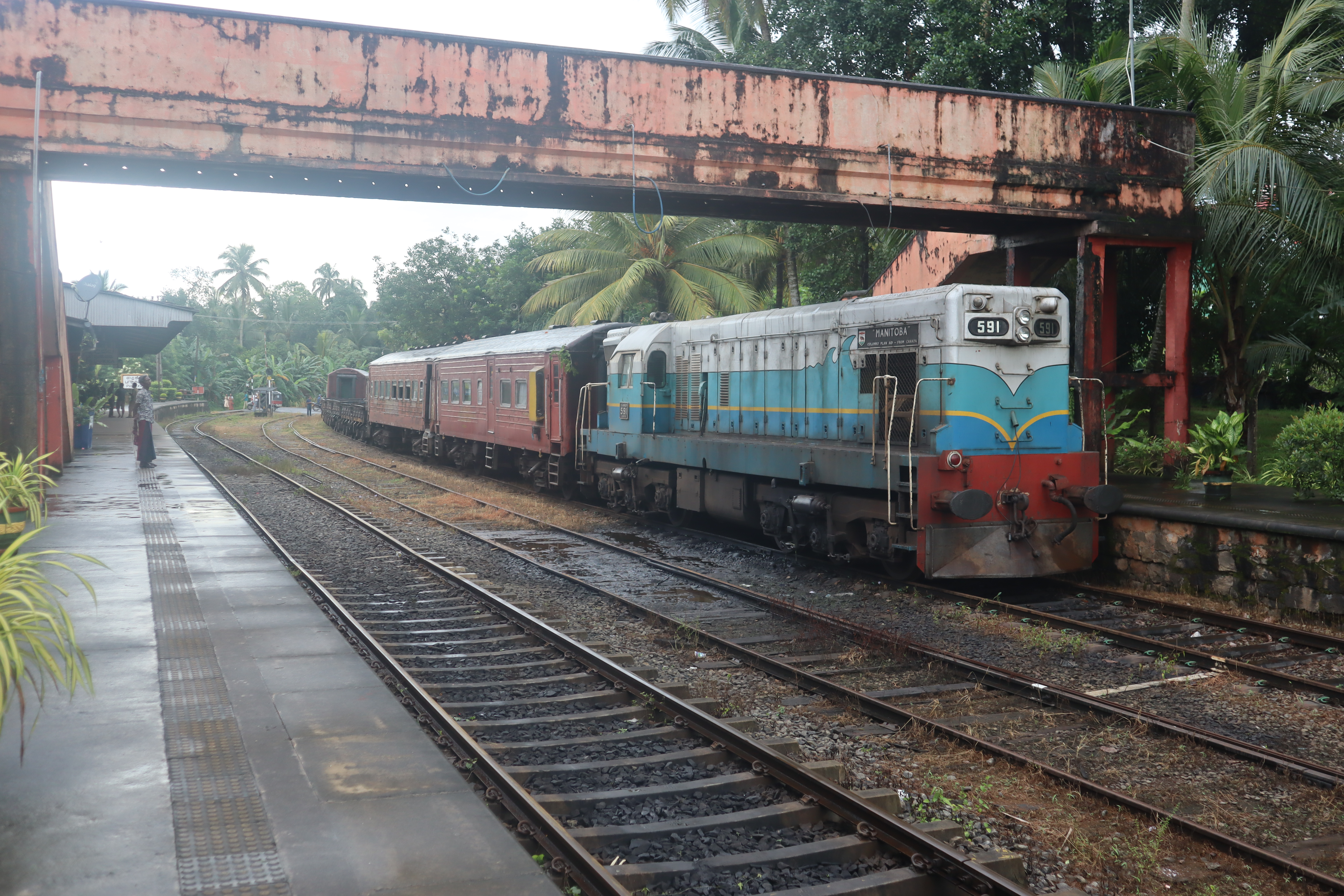
Class M2A 591 Manitoba hauling a special trial ballast train on the Kelani Valley Line, pictured at Padukka Railway Station on 7 July 2024.

Class M2 Locomotives could traverse the entire Sri Lankan railway network except for the Kelani Valley line due to its limitations. To assess the locomotive's efficiency and durability over that particular line, on 7 July 2024, Class M2A 591 Manitoba hauled a special trial ballast train over the Kelani Valley Railway line from Colombo to Avissawella. The trial was reportedly successful, and another special ballast train, hauled by Class M2 573 Quebec, ran to Avissawella on 9 October 2024.

==== Notable Trains ====
- Used to haul Colombo-Jaffna Yarl Devi Express and Night Mail Express. Now retired. Replaced by Class M10 & M11 Locomotives.
- Used to haul Colombo-Badulla Udarata Menike Express and Podi Menike Express. Now retired. Replaced by Class S14 diesel multiple units.
- Used to haul Colombo-Matara Ruhunu Kumari Express. Now retired. Replaced by Class S13 Diesel Multiple Units.
- Used to haul Colombo-Badulla Night Mail Express. Last used in 2018–19. Served with Class M6 Locomotives. Now retired.
- Used to haul No. 1009/10 Prestigious Colombo-Kandy Intercity Express. Served with Class M6 Locomotives. Partially retired. Used occasionally.
- Used to haul No. 8050 Colombo-Matara Express. Still in service.
- Used to haul Colombo-Batticaloa Meenagaya Intercity Express. Still in service.
- Used to haul Colombo-Batticaloa Udaya-Devi Express. Still in service.
- Used to haul Colombo-Trincomalee Night Mail Express. Now retired. Replaced by Class M8 & M11 Locomotives.
- Used to haul Colombo-Puttalam Mixed Train. Still in service.

Other than these trains, Class M2 Locomotives are used to haul oil and freight trains across the country. As of 2024, they are still used for regional trains on the Northern and Batticaloa Railway Lines.

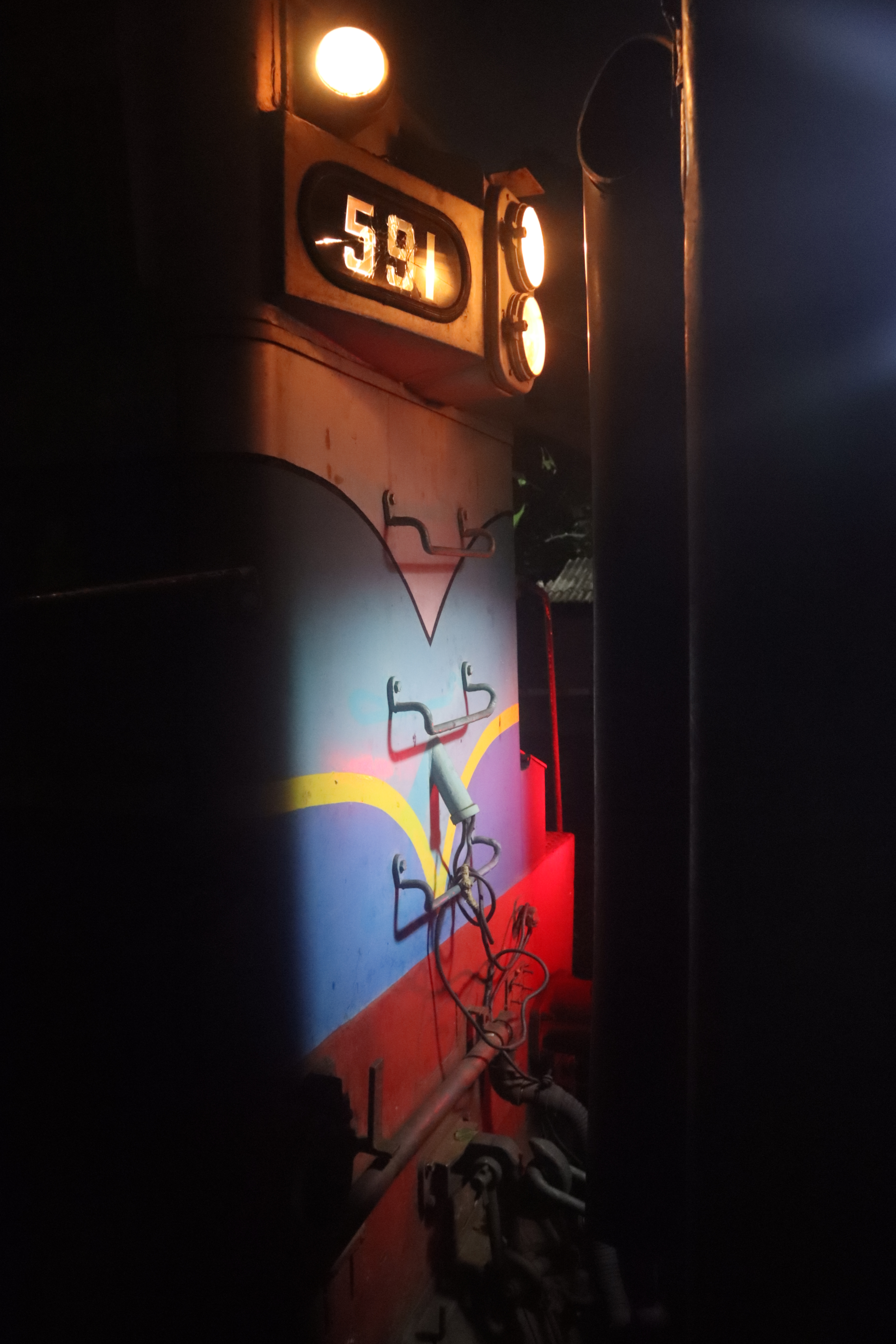
Night Dime Lights of Class M2A 591 Manitoba Locomotive.

=== Locomotive fleet ===
Table of locomotives
Class	Number	Name	Serial No.	Imported Year
M2	569	Ontario	A608	1954
M2	570	Alberta	A609	1954
M2	571	Saskatchewan	A720	1954
M2	572	British Columbia	A721	1954
M2	573	Quebec	A722	1955
M2a	591	Manitoba	A894	1956
M2a	592	Nova Scotia	A895	1956
M2a	593	New Brunswick	A896	1956
M2b	594	Prince Edward Island	A1325	1958
M2b	595	Newfoundland	A1326	1958
M2c	626	Montreal	A1920	1961
M2c	627	Vancouver	A1921	1961
M2d	628	Kankesanthurai	31211	1966
M2d	629	Galle	31212	1966

=== Accidents and incidents ===
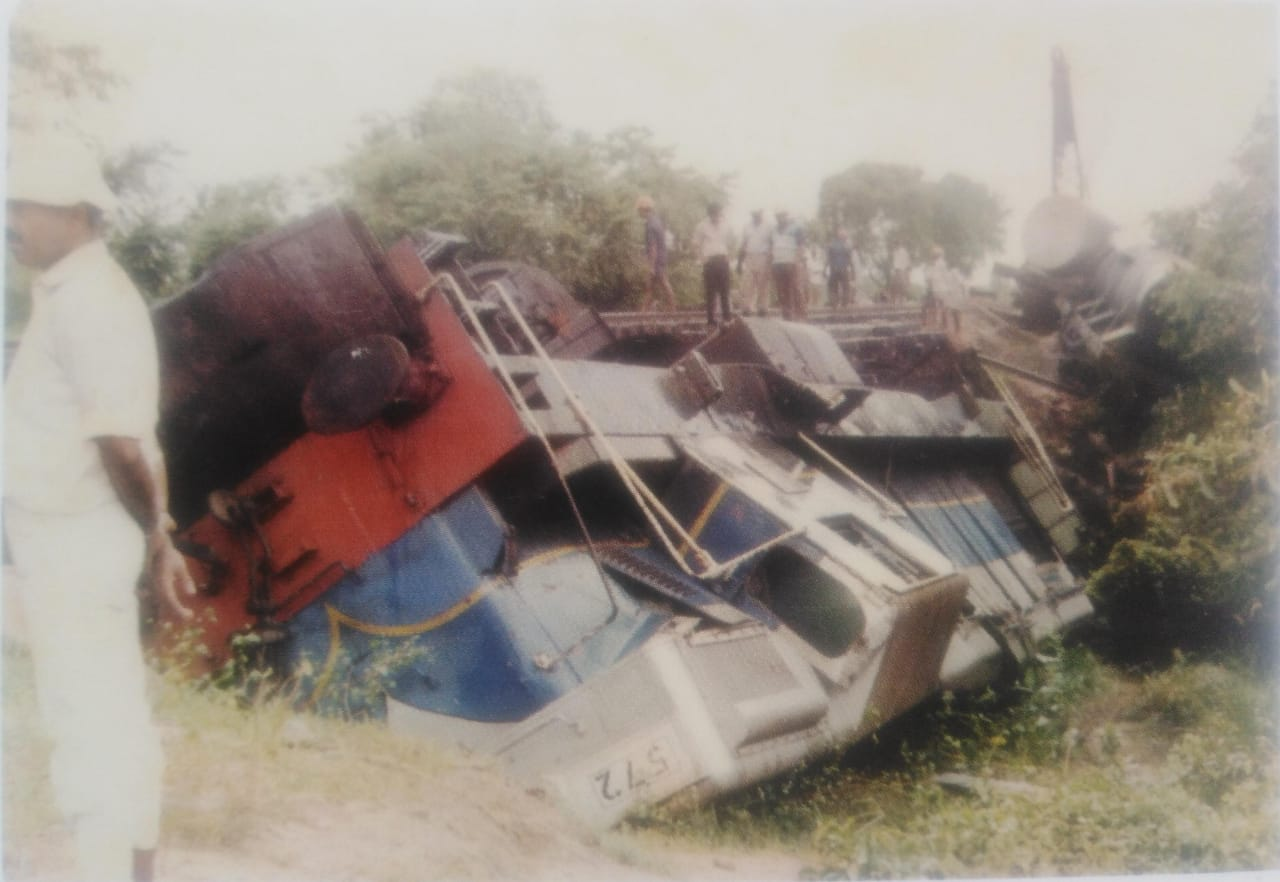
Derailed oil train hauled by Class M2 572 British Columbia on Batticaloa Line, November 1989.

- Number 572 British Columbia hauled the Mannar-Colombo Night Mail Express, which was derailed near Wilwatte in Mirigama on the early morning of 16 October 1964, resulting in 26 passengers killed and 130 others injured.
- Number 571 Saskatchewan was completely destroyed on 14 September 1985 near the village of Mollipothana in Trincomalee, due to a bomb blast by LTTE terrorists.
- Number 572 British Columbia, while hauling an oil train, derailed due to an act of sabotage in Batticaloa in November 1989.
- No. 570 Alberta was trapped at KKS Running Shed from 1989 to 1997 due to the civil war after hauling the Last Night Mail Express to Kankasanthurei. Disassembled and brought to Colombo by the ship Lanka Muditha, the locomotive was reassembled and returned to service.
- Number 591 Manitoba was damaged on 26 December 2004 when pulling the Matara Express and was hit by the Indian Ocean tsunami, and reentered service after four months. This locomotive was repainted to depict a sea wave on its livery.
- Number 570 Alberta received minor damage when it ran over a land mine at Punani on 7 June 2007.
- Number 570 Alberta, which hauled Vavuniya-Matara Express, was severely damaged as a result of a collision with another train at Pothuhera, Kurunegala on 30 April 2014.
- Number 628 Kankasanthurai was badly damaged by a land mine, but was rebuilt.

Class M2 Locomotives celebrated their Golden Jubilee in service in 2004. A special train hauled by a Class M2 Locomotive reached Jaffna to celebrate the 60th Anniversary of its service in 2014.

== Gallery ==
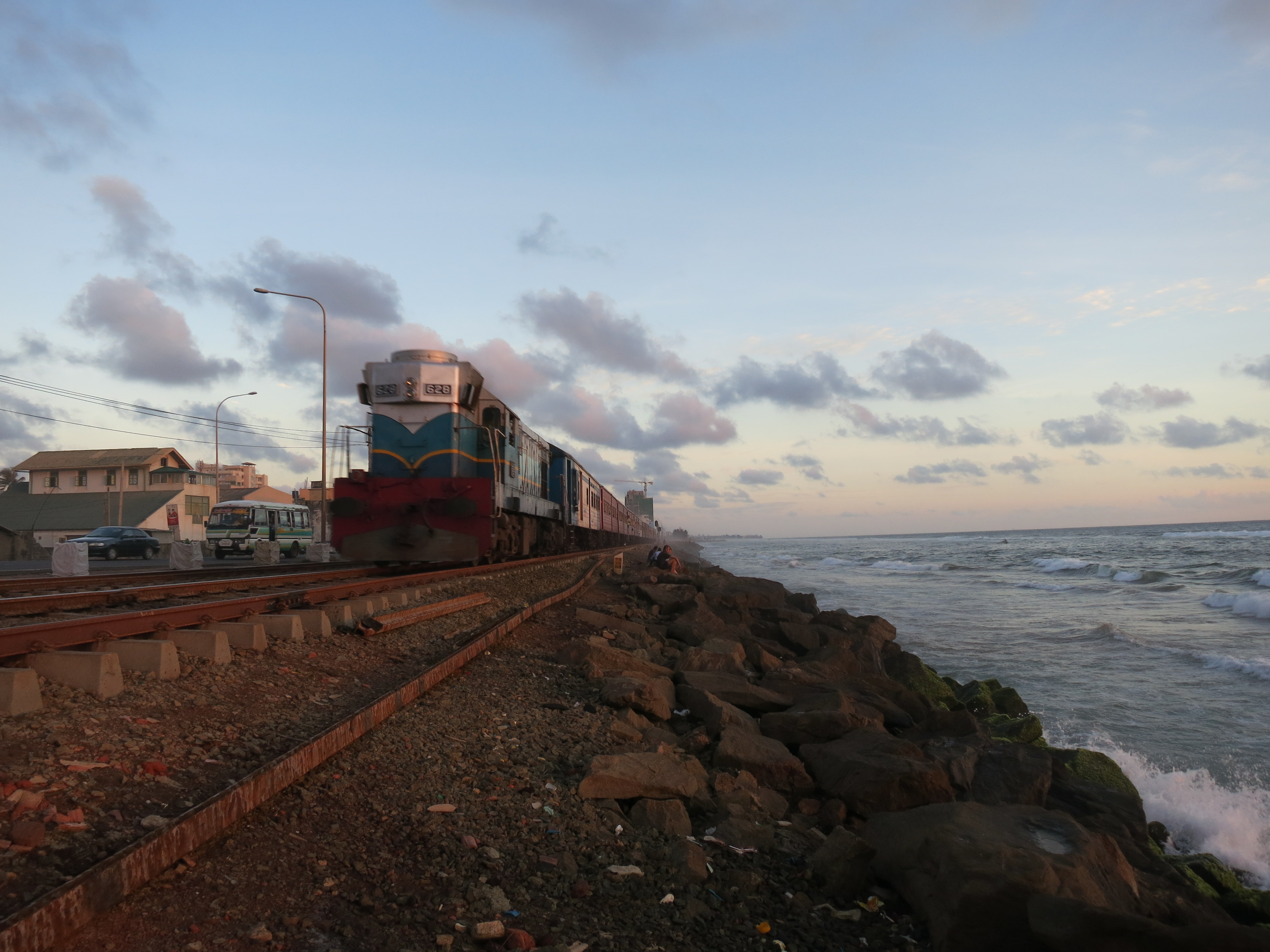
M2 628 Kankesanthurai hauling a Train on Coastal line.

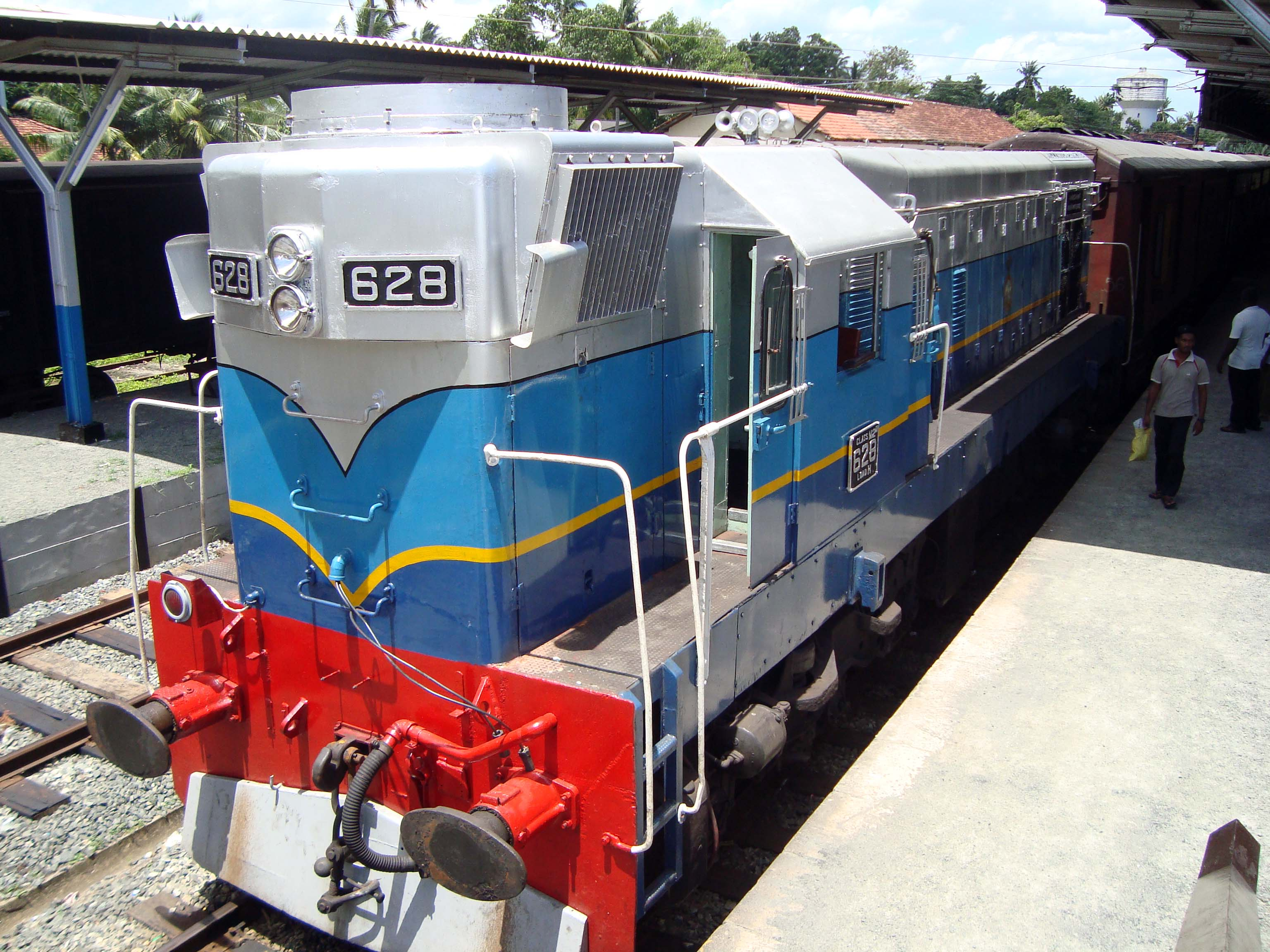
Class M2 No. 628 – Kankasanthurai at Matara Railway Station.

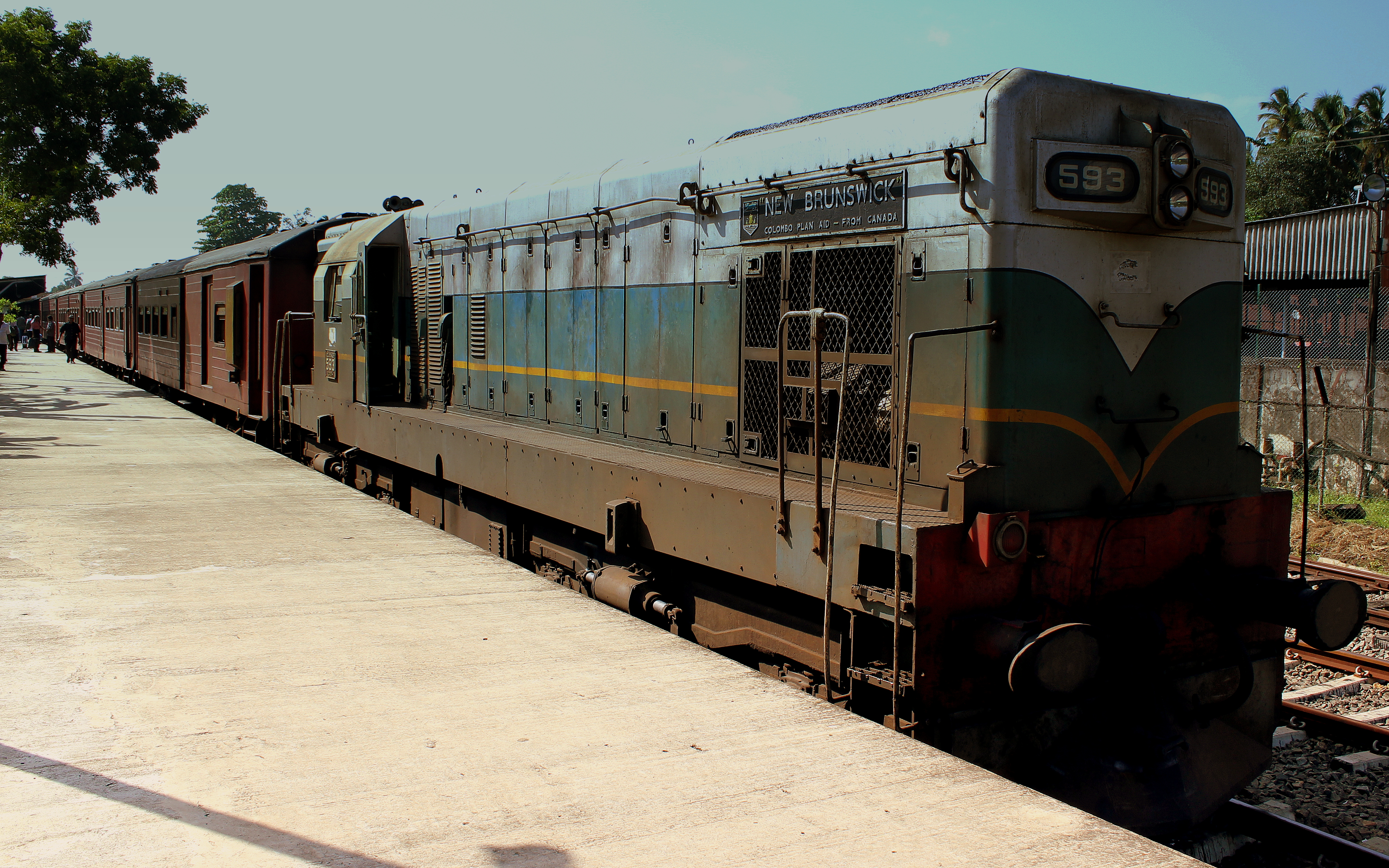
Class M2 593 – New Brunswick
