= Pusweli Oya =

Coordinates: 6°54′N 80°04′E

Location
- Country: Sri Lanka
- District: Kalutara

Physical characteristics
- Source: Horana
- Mouth: Kelani Ganga

The Pusweli Oya is a major tributary of the Kelani Ganga river in Sri Lanka.

Starting from the hills in Puswelihena in Horana Division of Kalutara District, it flows northwards through a low-lying flat land (6–10 meters above sea level) converted into rice fields, which ultimately becomes the stream's flood plain during rainy seasons. On its way, the stream is joined by the Ma Dola starting from the hills of Madoluwawa and Kurugala, the Angomuwa Oya starting from Angomuwa and Miriyagal Kanda and the Arukwathu Oya starting from Udagama Kanda (1492 feet above sea level). The stream flows for 16 km down its valley before joining the Kelani Ganga near Hanwella. The lowest part of its valley is mostly covered by a large marshland known as Barawa marshland, where there are river loops and islets on its course. The flood plain of the stream is flooded many times annually mainly during the monsoon season from May to September and the inter-monsoon season of October and November.

== See also ==
- List of rivers of Sri Lanka
