= Saint Sebastian School =

St. Sebastian's School, St. Sebastian School, Saint Sebastian's School, or Saint Sebastian School may refer to:

- Saint Sebastian's School in Needham, Massachusetts
- St. Sebastian School in Queens, New York
- St. Sebastian's College Kandana in the city of Kandana, Sri Lanka
- St. Sebastian's College, Moratuwa in Moratuwa, Sri Lanka
- San Sebastian College–Recoletos in the Philippines
- San Sebastian College–Recoletos de Cavite in the Philippines
