= Maduluwawe Sobitha Thera =

Sri Lankan political leader (1942 – 2015)

Ven. Maduluwawe Sobitha Thera
- පූජ්‍ය මාදුළුවාවේ සෝභිත හිමි
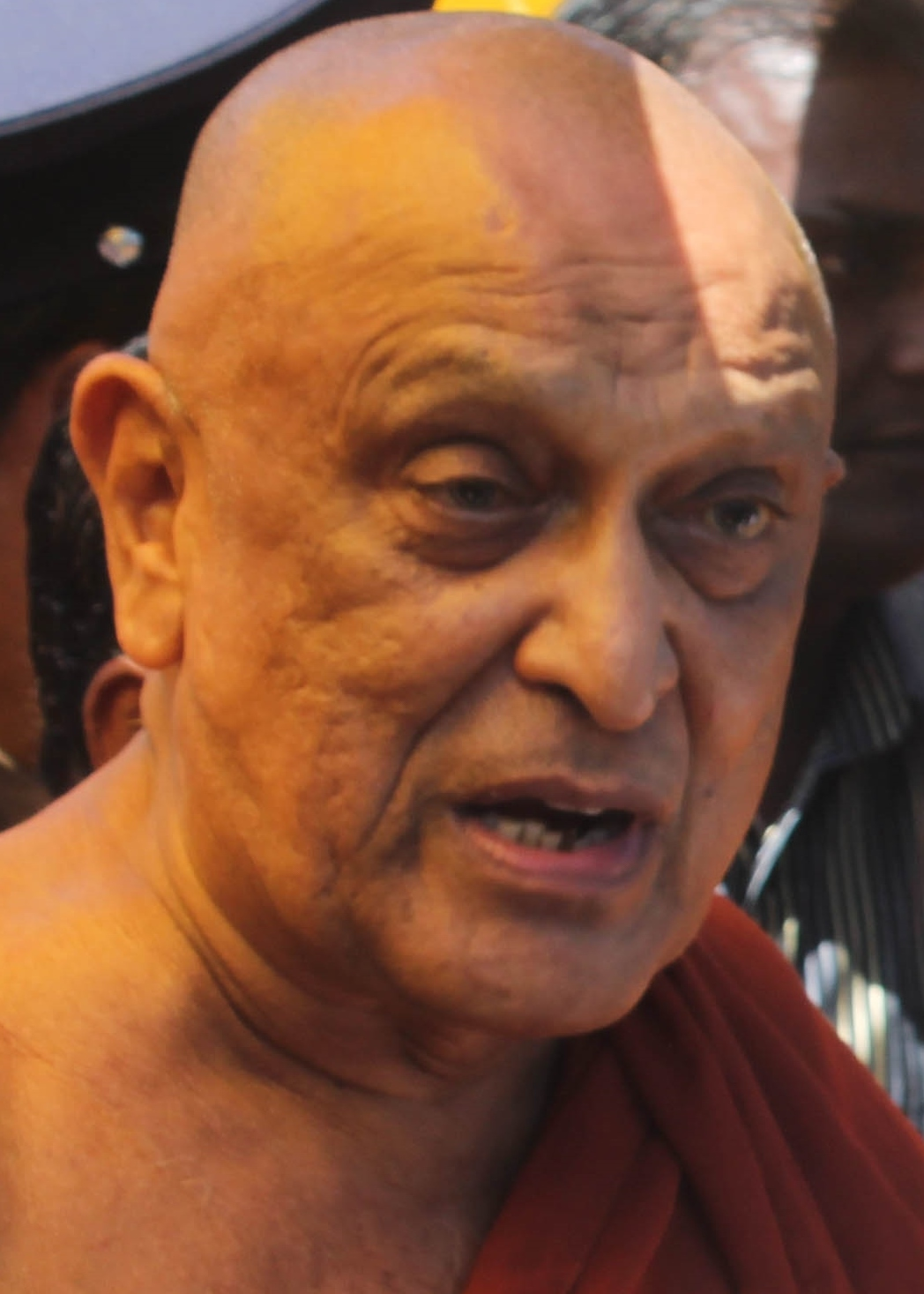
- Sobitha Thero in 2015
- Title: Chief Incumbent of the Kotte Naga Vihara

Personal life
- Born: Pathirage Don Rathnasekara; 29 May 1942 Padukka, Sri Lanka
- Died: 6 November 2015 (aged 73) Mount Elizabeth Hospital, Singapore
- Cause of death: Complications from Heart Surgery
- Parent(s): Pathirage Don Peiris Appuhamy (Father); Kuruwita Arachchige Karalinahami (Mother)
- Education: Vidyalankara Pirivena; University of Sri Jayewardenepura

Religious life
- Religion: Buddhism
- Temple: Kotte Naga Vihara
- School: Theravada
- Lineage: Siam Nikaya
- Dharma name: Ven. Maduluwawe Sobitha Thera

Maduluwawe Sobitha Thera (Sinhala: මාදුළුවාවේ සෝභිත හිමි; 29 May 1942 – 6 November 2015) was a Buddhist monk who participated in Sri Lankan politics and supported the 2015 presidential campaign of Maithripala Sirisena. He was the Chief Incumbent of the Kotte Naga Vihara.

== Personal life ==
Sobitha Thera was born on 29 May 1942, Vesak, in the village of Maduluwewa in Padukka, Homagama, as Pathirage Don Rathnasekara. He studied at Maduluwawe Maha Vidyalaya and began living in the temple in Padukka at the age of 11, under the guardianship of his uncle, the Head Monk. He was ordained a novice monk on 9 May 1955 at the Kotte Sri Naga Viharaya. In 1962, after studying at the Vidyodaya and Vidyalankara Pirivenas, he received his higher ordination. In 1967, he became the Chief Incumbent of the Kotte Raja Maha Vihara.

He died on 6 November 2015 at Mount Elizabeth Hospital in Singapore, aged 73. The government announced a state funeral and a day of national mourning.

== Political activities ==
Sobitha Thera opposed President J. R. Jayawardena's policies and the executive presidential system. He participated in political movements and supported various opposition candidates. He was a leader of the anti-Indian intervention campaign in the late 1980s. He participated in the National Movement for a Just Society (NMJS).

He supported the common candidate Maithripala Sirisena for the presidency and Ranil Wickremesinghe to form a new government in 2015 and campaigned for the release of Sarath Fonseka. He campaigned against the executive presidential system of Sri Lanka and spoke out on social justice issues.

== See also ==
- 2015 Sri Lankan presidential election
- New Democratic Front (Sri Lanka)
- Athuraliye Rathana Thera
