= Puttalam line =

Railway line in Sri Lanka

Overview
- Owner: Sri Lanka Railways
- Termini: Ragama Railway Station; Periyanagavillu Railway Station
- Stations: 42

Service
- Type: Intercity rail
- System: Sri Lanka Railways
- Operator(s): Sri Lanka Railways

History
- Opened: 12 May 1926

Technical
- Line length: 133 km (83 mi)
- Track gauge: 5 ft 6 in (1,676 mm)
- Electrification: No
- Operating speed: 100 kmph

The Puttalam line (originally called the North-Western Line) is a 5 ft 6 in (1,676 mm) broad gauge railway line in the rail network of Sri Lanka. The 133 km (83 mi) railway line begins at Ragama junction and runs through the major towns along the north-west coast of the country, through to Periyanagavillu. It has forty two stations along its length.

== Route definition ==
The line starts from Ragama and runs through the towns of Kandana, Ja-Ela, Seeduwa, Katunayake, Negombo, the line becomes single-track from this point onwards, and passes through, Lunuwila, Naththandiya, Madampe, Chilaw, Bangadeniya, Mundel and ends at Puttalam.

The passenger trains by Sri Lanka Railways are operated up to Noor Nagar station beyond the Puttalam station and railway section beyond Noor Nagar station is used by INSEE Cement for the transportation of raw materials from quarry to the factory at Puttalam.

This line is also used for the transportation of oil by trains to the Colombo International Airport.

== History ==
Construction of the rail line to Puttalam commenced on 3 July 1907, with the laying of a railway line from Ragama to Ja-Ela. The project was initiated by Sir Henry Arthur Blake, Governor of Ceylon. The first passenger operations commenced on 9 November 1908. The Negombo railway station was opened on 1 December 1909, with the line extended to Chilaw in 1916. In November 1920 work commenced on the extension to Puttalam, which was officially opened on 12 May 1926.

In 1943 the track from Bangadeniya to Puttalam was removed, as the rails were required on other strategically important routes due to shortages caused by World War II. It was re-laid in 1946 with a number of new stations added to the line. The line was also extended beyond Puttalam to Periyanagavillu, where the route forked, with one line running to Aruwakkalu and the other to Illuwankulam.

In 2011 a 20 km (12 mi) dual track between Ragama and Ja-Ela was officially opened. In 2017 the government commenced investigating the feasibility of extending the rail line from Puttalam via Norocholai power station (servicing the country's main coal power plant) to Mahawa, connecting the Northern and Puttalam lines.

== Operations ==
This line is served by passenger and freight trains mostly class S8 and S9 are used for daytime passenger trains whilst S10 and S11 help during rush hour. Some trains are hauled by the locomotives M2 or M4. The main terminals of the trains are Negombo, Madampe, Chilaw, Puttalam and Noor Nagar. Trains get very crowded during peak times between Colombo and Negombo.

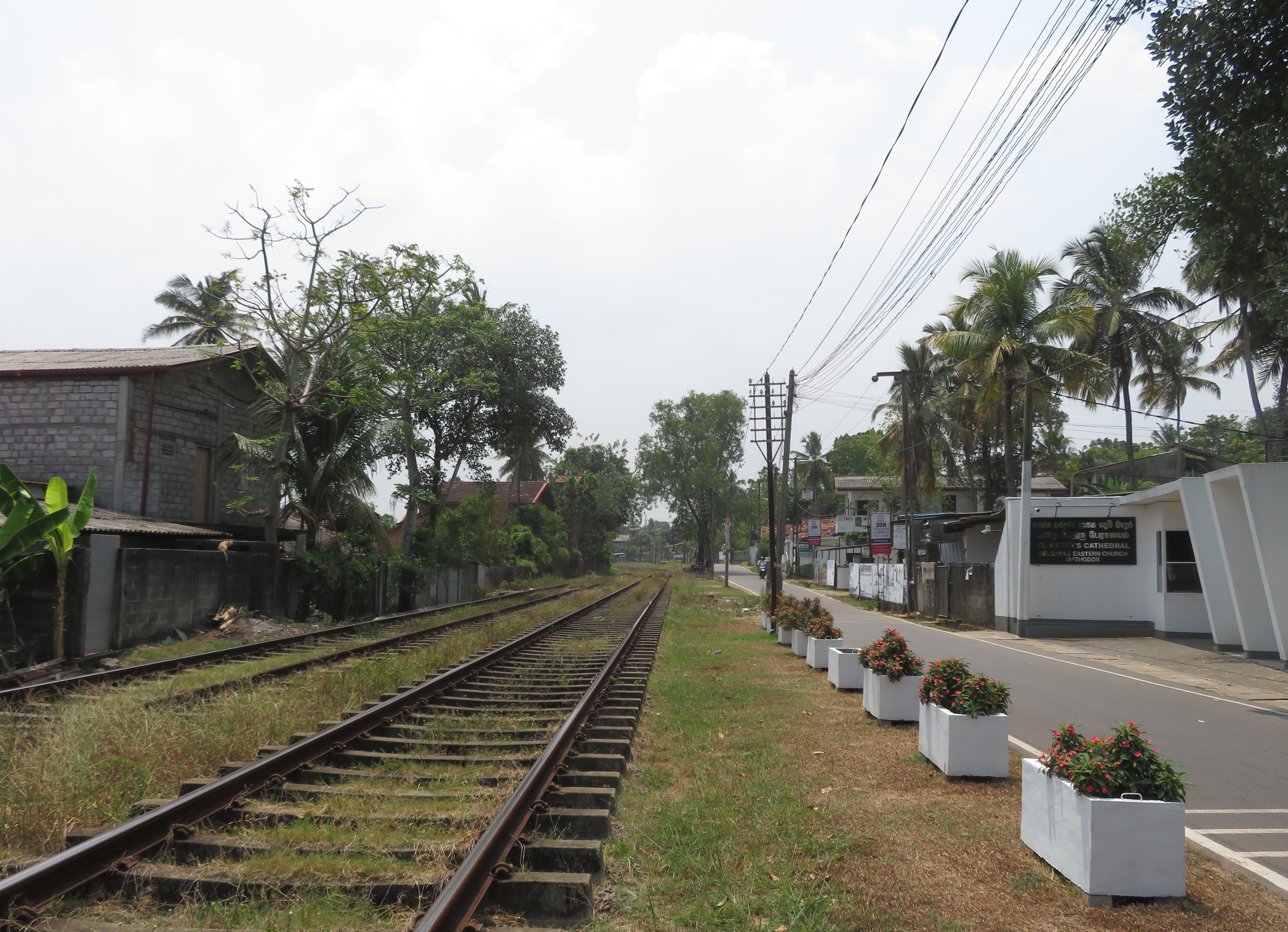
Puttalam line in Kandana

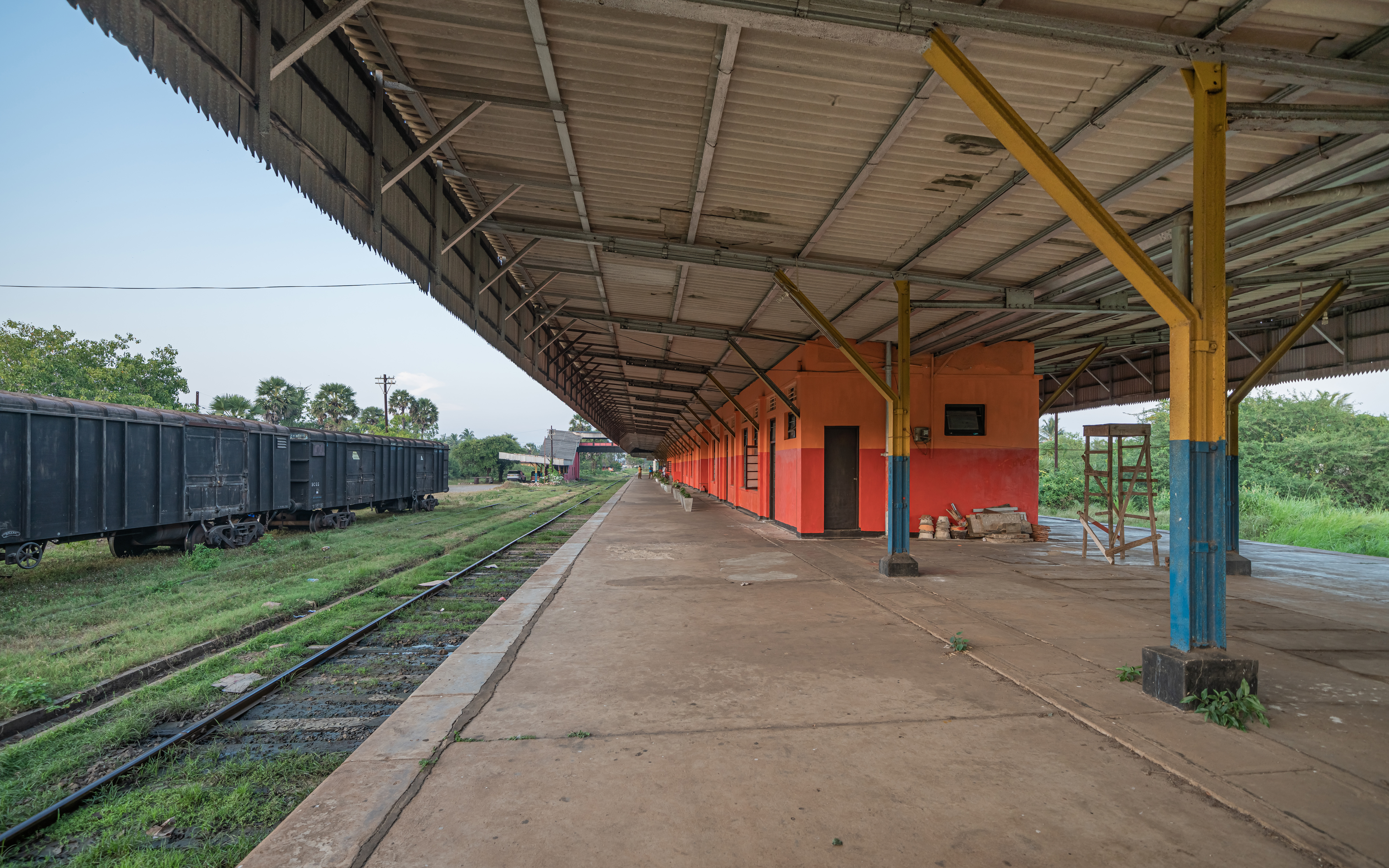
Puttalam station

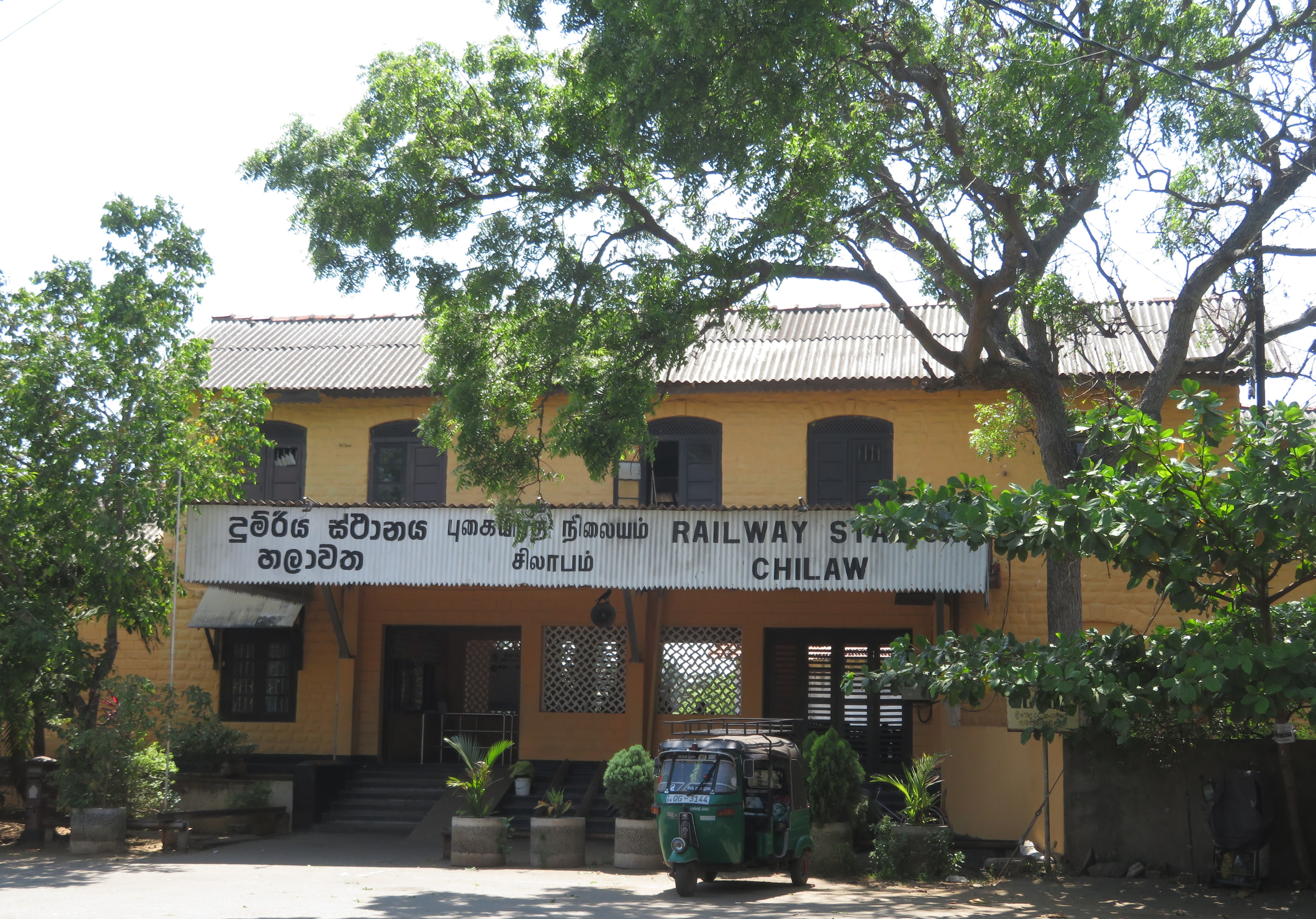
Chilaw railway station
