= Ragama =

Ragama රාගම ரா௧ம
- Suburb
- Location within Sri Lanka
- Coordinates: 7°1′51″N 79°55′0″E
- Country: Sri Lanka
- Province: Western Province
- District: Gampaha District
- Divisional Secretariat: Ja-Ela
- Elevation: 10 m (33 ft)
- Time zone: UTC+5:30 (Sri Lanka Standard Time Zone)
- Postal code: 11010
- Area code: 011

Ragama (Sinhala: රාගම Tamil: ரா௧ம) is an outer suburb of Colombo, located in the Gampaha District, Western Province, Sri Lanka. It is governed by the Ja-Ela Divisional Secretariat.

== History ==
In July 1874 a rail line, known as the Breakwater line, was opened connecting the Harbour Works Quarry at Ragama to the Colombo Harbour breakwater, in order to enable stone to be transported to the harbor to construct the breakwater. Stone from a second quarry at Ragama was then used to stabilise the Coastal line where it ran on the edge of the beach.

On 8 January 1901 the British War Office established a prisoner-of-war camp in Ragama to house Boer prisoners captured in the Second Boer War. The prisoners at Ragama were primarily dissidents, foreign volunteers and irreconcilables who refused to sign an oath of allegiance to the British Crown, and were transferred from the main camp at Diyatalawa.

Ragama served as the main observation camp for coolies entering the country. The coolies disembarked at Colombo and were sent by train to Ragama, where they were detained for forty eight hours before being transported to various tea plantations around the country. In 1904, 76,963 coolies from Southern India came through the camp and in 1905 this increased to 132,690.

== Transport ==
Ragama is accessible from the A3 highway (Colombo-Negombo road) and is about 5 km (3.1 mi) from Mahabage junction. Sri Lanka's second motorway flyover was built in 1996 over the main railway line right at the town centre, at a cost of Rs 200 million.

Ragama Junction railway station is a main railway junction, where the Main line and the Puttalam line diverge. The first stage of the Puttalam line from Ragama to Ja-Ela was constructed in 1908 and the full length to Puttalam through Peralanda completed in May 1926.

== Health ==
The Colombo North Teaching Hospital is located at Ragama. It is the second largest hospital in Sri Lanka, with a 1,442 bed capacity. The hospital comprises the District Hospital Kandana, the Rehabilitation Hospital, Ragama and the Nurses Training School, Kandana. It also associated with the University of Kelaniya's Faculty of Medicine and is known for having one of the most advanced diagnostic departments in the country. It also boasts the country's only Liver Transplant Unit.

Other hospitals in Ragama include the National Hospital for Respiratory Diseases, the Ragama Rehabilitation Hospital, Melsta Hospital, Leesons Hospital and Suwasarana Hospital.

== Government facilities ==
Ragama is home to several important government establishments in the country. They include:

1. Sri Lanka Navy (Gemunu) Brigade
2. Sri Lanka Navy (Mahasen) Brigade
3. College of Naval Architecture (attached to Sri Lanka Navy)
4. Mahara Prison (a maximum security prison and one of the largest prisons in the country)
5. Governments Ammunition Storage
6. Faculty of Medicine - University of kelaniya
7. Ayati Center
8. Ranawiru Sewana

== Religion ==
1. St. Lazarus' Church, Kurukulawa
2. Basilica of Our Lady of Lanka, Tewatte
3. Weluwanaramaya Temple
4. Ragama Dewalaya
5. St. Peter & Pauls' Church, Ragama
6. Christ the King Church, Lenchiyawatta
7. Christ the Healer Church, Ragammulla
8. Word of Power Ministries (Kingdom Centre) - branch Ragama
9. Assemblies of God Church, Ragama
10. Sri Sugatharama Temple Ihalagama. (with Iahalagama Lake)
