= Swadeshi Industrial Works =

Personal care products manufacturing company in Sri Lanka

The Swadeshi Industrial Works PLC
- Logo of the company
- Company type: Public
- Traded as: CSE: SWAD.N0000
- ISIN: LK0161N00006
- Industry: Personal care
- Founded: 1941; 85 years ago
- Founder: S. M. Nayagam
- Headquarters: Kandana, Sri Lanka
- Key people: Amari Wijewardene (Chairperson); C. S. M. Samarasinghe (Managing Director/Deputy Chairperson)
- Revenue: ▲LKR4,819 million (2023)
- Operating income: ▲LKR257 million (2023)
- Net income: ▲LKR200 million (2023)
- Total assets: ▲LKR3,405 million (2023)
- Total equity: ▲LKR1,698million (2023)
- Owners: C. S. M. Samarasinghe (33.74%); Seylan Bank/Senthilverl Holdings (24.79%); Sedawatte Exports (19.72%)
- Subsidiaries: The Swadeshi Chemicals
- Website: swadeshiherbal.com

The Swadeshi Industrial Works PLC is a personal care products manufacturing company in Sri Lanka. The company became the first local soap manufacturing company when the company was incorporated in 1941. Swadeshi is a listed company on the Colombo Stock Exchange. Brand Finance calculated Swadeshi Industrial Works' brand value to be LKR543 million in 2022 and ranks the company as 85th most valuable brand in Sri Lanka.

== History ==
The Swadeshi Industrial Works PLC was established in 1941 and was the first local soap manufacturing company in the country. Swadeshi is one of the native industrial companies developed during the wartime economic background. By 1958, Swadeshi was one of the four soap manufacturers in Sri Lanka. Others were Lever Brothers, British Ceylon Corporation, and Eastern Chemical Industries. Although inedible tallow was used in manufacturing soap, coconut oil was the main raw material used. In 1960, the company sought to partner up with American soap and toiletries manufacturers to expand its business. At the time, the company was manufacturing safety matches, plastic moulding, photoengraving and printing besides manufacturing soap and toiletries.

Swadeshi obtained a restraining order against Vendol Lanka preventing Vendol Lanka from marketing its Apsara soap. In 1999, Swadeshi launched a new soap product called Apsara after registering the trade mark with the National Intellectual Property Office. Vendol Lanka followed up by launching its own product called Apsara, with identical packaging in the same colour. After a decade-long legal battle, Swadeshi won its case against Vendol in 2012. Swadeshi obtained an enjoining order against Lanka Sathosa and ReeBonn Lanka regarding Sathosa Khomba soap in December 2021. Swadeshi instituted a legal dispute over a trademark violation and unfair competition law.

== Operations ==
Swadeshi Industrial Works ranked 29th in LMD 100's second board for the financial year 2020/21. LMD 100 ranks listed companies in Sri Lanka by revenue annually. Amari Wijewardene is the company's chairperson and a member of the Wijewardene family. Wijewardene's appointment as the Sri Lankan High Commissioner to the United Kingdom in 2016 by her cousin, then prime minister Ranil Wickremesinghe was criticised as nepotism. Over the years, the company has sponsored the Buddhist ritual of Aloka Pooja (illumination offering) in various prominent temples across the country. This is carried out as a part of the company's corporate social responsibility programme. The programme has been conducted in many temples including Ridi Viharaya, Kelaniya Raja Maha Vihara, Kiri Vehera and Kataragama temple.

Swadeshi signed an agreement with UNICEF to partner up with respect to UNICEF's betterparenting.lk website. During the onset of the COVID-19 pandemic in Sri Lanka, Swadeshi donated Swadeshi Khomba soap and hand sanitisers to the armed forces, who were the frontline workers. The company obtained the COVID-19 Safety Management System certification from the Sri Lanka Standards Institution. The 80th anniversary of Rani Sandalwood soap was marked by the company by launching a new packaging.

== See also ==
- Swadeshi movement, Mahatma Gandhi's concept of self-sufficiency which extended to developing native industries
- List of companies listed on the Colombo Stock Exchange
