= Hanwella =

Hanwella හංවැල්ල ஹன்வெல்லை
- Map of Sri Lanka showing the location of Hanwella
- Coordinates: 06°52′48″N 080°05′15″E
- Country: Sri Lanka
- Province: Western Province
- District: Colombo District
- Time zone: UTC+5:30 (Sri Lanka Standard Time Zone)
  - Summer (DST): UTC+6 (Summer time)
- Postal Code: 10650

Hanwella is a town in Sri Lanka, situated about 30 km (19 mi) from Colombo, the commercial capital of the country. Hanwella lies on the Colombo-Ratnapura main road, on the banks of the Kelani River.

== Geography ==
This historic city belongs to the Colombo district and Avissawella electorate. Hanwella is one of three major towns in the Seethawake pradeshiya sabha, the other two being Kosgama and Padukka. Hanwella lies on both of the Colombo-Ratnapura roads, namely the Highlevel and Lowlevel roads. The Kelani River, one of Sri Lanka's major rivers, runs alongside the town. Hanwella borders the Gampaha district. The nearest towns are Padukka (8 km), Pugoda (8 km), Kosgama(8 km) and Nawagamuwa (8 km).

There are some waterfalls, and lush green hills and rubber plantations surround the city. Two main reservoirs, called Labugama and Kalatuwawa, are situated close to Hanwella and supply water.

== History ==
Hanwella was part of the ancient Seethawaka kingdom. Many battles between Portuguese soldiers and Sinhalese troops took place in Hanwella and the surrounding area. These sites have been preserved and can be seen in the Hanwella restaurant district. Portuguese and other colonial influences are still visible in the town.

Prior to the construction of the Colombo-Kandy highway by the British, the main access road to Kandy and the interior of the country was via Hanwella.

== Urbanisation ==
Hanwella is rapidly becoming urbanised. Several factories have been built in and around the city. The local version of the Disneyland, "Leisure World", is an attraction for kids a few kilometres away from the town. Currently, the part of the town situated on the Highlevel Road is gradually developing into a separate town called Pahatgama.

== Facilities ==
Among government institutions, the Divisional secretariat office is located in Pahatgama on Highlevel Road. The main schools are Rajasinghe Central College, Roman Catholic, and Mayadunna Vidyalaya. MOH office, Hanwella is located about 8 km (5.0 mi) away from the town at Kosgama.
