= St. Sebastian's College Kandana =

St. Sebastian's College, Kandana
- සාන්ත සෙබස්තියන් විද්‍යාලය, කඳාන
- Kandana, Gampaha District; Western Province; Sri Lanka

Information
- School type: Government school
- Motto: Sapientia Est Lumen
- Established: 1979
- Founder: Arangalla
- Principal: Mrs. Shiromani Crishanthi Ratnayake
- Grades: Grade 1 to 13
- Gender: Male
- Language: Sinhala, English
- Colours: Green, red and white
- Song: "වොරැ‍ඳේ වොරැ‍ඳේ..."
- Alumni: Sebastianites
- Website: Sebastianite official website

St. Sebastian's College is a school in Kandana, Sri Lanka. It is located in the Ja-Ela Education Division of the Negombo Zone in the Gampaha District. Its current principal is Mrs. Shiromani Crishanthi Ratnayake.

== See also ==
- List of schools in Sri Lanka
