= Kottawa Dharmapala Maha Vidyalaya =

Location
- Kottawa; Sri Lanka
- Coordinates: 6°50′29″N 79°57′53″E

Information
- Type: Public school
- Motto: ඉගෙනුමට අපි එමු සේවයට පිටවෙමු
- Established: 1 February 1970
- Principal: Captain Kapila Weerasooriya
- Grades: 1 - 13
- Color(s): Blue and yellow
- Affiliation: Ministry of Education
- Website: http://kdmvkottawa.org/

Kottawa Dharmapala Maha Vidyalaya is a Buddhist school in Sri Lanka, which provides primary and secondary education. It was founded on 1 February 1970 in Kottawa.

== History ==
In February 1970, the school was founded with 158 students, 5 teachers and one building, with a contribution from Parliament minister M.D.H Jayewardhana. The first principal was L. D. Premarathne.

== Houses ==
- - Mayura (මයුර)
- - Hansa (හංස)
- - Lihini (ලිහිණි)
- - Paravi (පරවි)

== Sports ==
- Badminton
- Chess
- Taekwondo
- Judo
- Football
- Netball
- Volleyball
- Handball
- Athletics
- Karate
- Swimming
- Cadeting
- Scouting
- Cub Scouting
- Gymnastics

== Notable alumni ==
- Kusal Janith Perera, Sri Lankan Cricketer
- Dulani Chamika, Mechatronics Engineer
