= Ananda Vidyalaya, Kottawa =

Kottawa Ananda Maha Vidyalaya is a school that was founded on 1 April 1902 in Kottawa.

A school in Sri Lanka, provides primary and secondary education.

In 2003 the schools principal M.G.G. Ddharmadasa was arrested for sexual bribery.

In 2004 the school was funded by the Economic Development Ministry to build a new three-storey building.

The principal since 2023 is Mrs. Disna Shiromani Welikala.
