= Kottawa railway station =

Railway station in Sri Lanka

Kottawa Railway Station

General information
- Coordinates: 6.843763°N 79.968114°E
- Owner: Sri Lanka Railways
- Line: Kelani Valley Line
- Platforms: 2

Other information
- Station code: KOT

History
- Opened: 1912
- Rebuilt: 1992

Services
Intermediate stop at Kottawa:
Commuter Rail - Kaleni Valley line
Location

Kottawa Railway Station is a railway station near Kottawa, Sri Lanka, which is a suburb of Colombo. This station serves the Kaleni Valley Line and services are provided by Sri Lanka Railways.

== History ==
Kottawa station was constructed as part of the Kelani Valley railway, a narrow-gauge railway (2ft 6in (762mm)) line, which commenced in 1900 and was completed in 1902, with an extension reaching Opanayake in 1919. The railway line primarily served the rubber plantations in the area.

In 1992 the Kottawa railway station was rebuilt in a new location, as part of the broad-gauge conversion of the Kelani Valley line.

Kottawa was included in a proposal for elevated commuter rail lines serving the Colombo metropolitan area. An elevated track named "Neela" (Blue), 23 km (14 mi) in length, was proposed to connect Hunupitiya to Kottawa via Pelawatte.

== Location ==
Kottawa Station is located 500 m (1,600 ft) north of Kottawa along the Athurugiriya road. The station is 21.31 kilometres (13.24 mi) from the Colombo Fort station

== Services ==
The station is served by the Kelani Valley Line, which connects Colombo to Avissawella.

Preceding station	Sri Lanka Railways	Following station
Pannipitiya	Commuter Rail	Malapalla

== See also ==
- Railway stations in Sri Lanka
- Sri Lanka Railways
- List of railway stations by line order in Sri Lanka
- Sri Lanka Railways
