= Padukka =

Padukka පාදුක්ක பாதுக்கை
- suburb
- Location within Colombo District Location within Sri Lanka
- Coordinates: 6°50′06″N 80°05′30″E
- Country: Sri Lanka
- Province: Western Province
- Time zone: UTC+5:30 (Sri Lanka Standard Time)

Padukka (Sinhala: පාදුක්ක, Tamil: பாதுக்கை) is a town in the district of Colombo in the Western Province of Sri Lanka. It has a population of roughly 8,000. Elevation 44feet.

Padukka, which is part of the Avissawella electorate is situated 33 kilometers east of Colombo, the commercial capital of Sri Lanka, and on the bank of Pusweli Oya on a high ground surrounded by marshland.

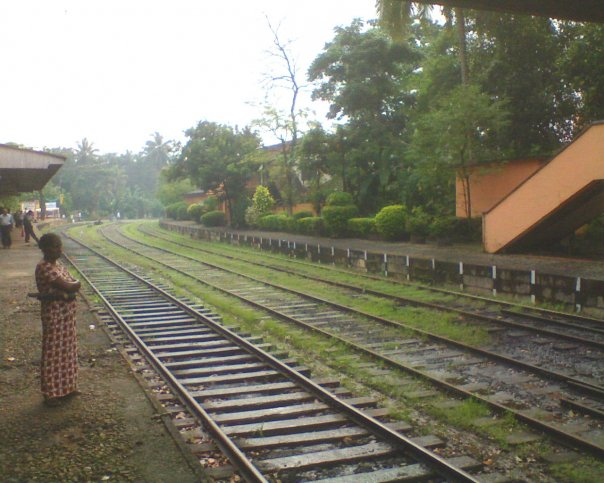

== History ==
The town of Padukka is thought to have been founded as a camp site by the forces of the Seethawaka Kingdom in the 16th century CE, on the banks of the Pusweli Oya (a major tributary of Kelani Ganga river), at a location where the Arukwathu Oya (stream) joins the Pusweli Oya. It was a well-protected site with marshland and hills surrounding the site. Legend says that the town got its name as it was under the "Naa" (Iron Wood) Trees in the town that the Portuguese Army rested after being defeated by the Army of King Seethawa Rajasinghe in the battle at the adjoining Hanwella Fort. It was said that the defeated Portuguese army rested there until they settled their minds. Thus in the Sinhala Language it was called "Paha Dukka" ("paha"= vanish; "dukka"= sadness), which became "Padukka" (පාදුක්ක) later. The famous "Naa" (Iron Wood) Trees are still present at the town's rest house premises.

Padukka has also played a significant role in other wars against Portuguese occupants as an integral part of the Hewagam Korale which literally means the korale (an administrative division) that provided soldiers (hewa). According to the historical data, Sinhalese soldiers confronted the retreating Portuguese army, chased them down at the current Galagedera junction, and inflicted heavy casualties upon the Portuguese contingent.

Names of satellite villages bear testimony to the rich historical legacy of Sithawake kingdom in current Padukka area. Angampitiya which is just 4 miles from the city centre is believed to be the place where king observed the kind of martial art known as Angam Poraya. Kelimadala is believed to be the play ground of Sithawake royalty. Bope was a thick jungle according to the book Kunsthanthinu hatana( Konstantine's war) written by Alagiyawanna Mukaweti of "Subhashithaya" fame.

Moreover the area called "Legumbima", in the adjoining village, "Udumulla", had been a camp site of Portuguese Army.

== Location ==
Padukka can be accessed via the B240 (Sri Jayawardanapura - Padukka - Bope highway, earlier B2) highway (33 km from Colombo) or by the Kelani Valley Railway Line (take approximately 1.5hrs for the slow train ride from Colombo - distance 35 km). An alternative but comfortable drive (36 km from Colombo) is via the Colombo-Avissawella (Highlevel) road (A4 Axis) up to Galagedera junction. From here, one has to take a turn to the right and drive on Horana road to Padukka town(1.5 km). It is one of the borders of Colombo District. Horana, the next town after Padukka, belongs to Kalutara District. Homagama, Horana, Hanwella, Halbarawa and Handapangoda are the adjoining towns to Padukka. Udumulla, Meepe, Galagedera, Liyanwala, Malagala, Yatawatura, Beliaththawila, Kahawala, Menerigama, Poregedara, Kotigamgoda, Bope, Arukwatta, Weragala, Angampitiya, Pitumpe, Uggalla, Wewelpanawa, Diddeniya, Udagama, Dambora, Panaluwa, Angamuwa, Meeriyagalla, Mawathagama, Galkaduwa, Koshena, Watareka, Daampe, Horagala-East, Horagala-West, Kurugala and Madulawa are main satellite villages scattered around Padukka.

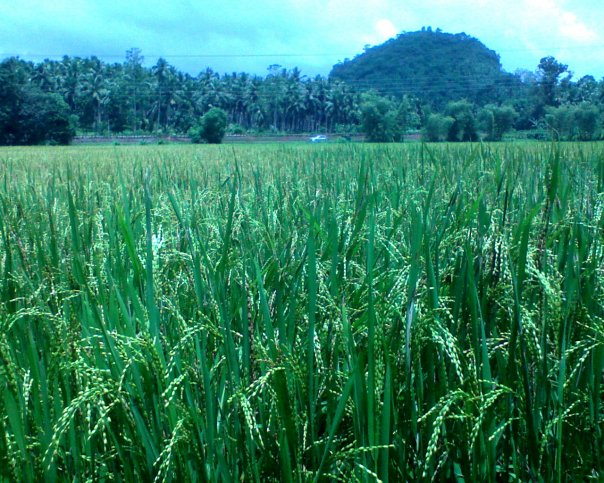

== Public transport ==
=== Bus ===
Route	Destination	Via
125	Colombo(Pettah)	Godagama, Homagama, Maharagama, Nugegoda, Kirulapona, Havelock Road.
182	Hanwella	Meepe, Pahathgama
239	Waga (Irida pola)	Meepe, Pitumpe, Pinnawala
239/1	Avissawella	Bope, Dambora, Thummodara, Pangngagula, Puwakpitiya
282	Horana / Yatawathura	Malagala
317	Handapangoda	Mahingala
315	Meepe - Horana	Moragahahena
239/2	Udagama / Madakada	Bope
366/1	Madulawa /Horagala West / Halbarawa	Kurugala
364	Batawala	

=== Train ===
- Kelani Valley line

FROM	TO	VIA	Distance
Colombo Fort(Pettah)	Padukka	Kirulapone, Nugegoda, Maharagama, Kottawa, Homagama, Meegoda	37.2 km
Awissawella	Padukka	Puwakpitiya, Kosgama, Waga, Angampitiya	24 km

Link: Tarin Time schedule

== Development ==
The development of Padukka as an urban center began with the building of a road from Colombo to Ingiriya in the 19th century and the opening of the interior forests with the spreading of rubber, tea, cinnamon and coconut plantations. The building of the Kelani valley railway in 1902, which ran from Colombo to Yatiyantota and Ratnapura passing Padukka and Avissawella, also contributed greatly to the growth of the city. In 1871, when the first census in the country was done, the town's population stood at 400.

With rapid urbanization in the country, Padukka and its surrounding villages have started to expand vastly. As a result, the government has carved out a separate divisional secretariat division for Padukka from the Hanwella division to which it previously belonged. Padukka city has become the main administrative centre of this divisional secretariat whose current population stands at 54395.

== Demographics ==
Padukka is predominantly a Sinhalese area, with 95.8% of the population being Sinhalese. Tamils (both Sri Lankan and Indian) comprise 2.4% while Sri Lankan Moors are also present. 1405 people live in the estate sector in the division. Religious composition is also similar to racial distribution with 94.6% Buddhists, 1.9% Hindus, 1.7% Christians and 1.8% Muslims.

The number of housing units in the Padukka division, according to the census data of 2001, is 15010 while total number of building units including government buildings is 17065.

== Administration ==
The Padukka city, which was once administered by the Padukka—Waga Village Council is now run by the Seethawaka Pradeshiya Sabha (Divisional Council). Notable government institutions in Padukka include:

- Divisional Secretariat
- Police Station
- Government Hospital
- Rest House
- Railway Station
- Bope Rajasinghe National School
- Siri Piyaratana Central College

The office of the Medical Officer of Health (MOH) the main preventive medicine centre for public health activities in the region is situated on Horana Road in Padukka town. This MOH office has a unique history having dated back to British colonial era. The Padukka hospital also has a long history in the Sri Lankan medical system.

There is a monumental gas lamp placed in the center of the town to commemorate the peace treaty ending World War I in 1919. Padukka also has a splendid Rest House run by the Sri Lanka Tourist Board and also a few Guest Houses.

Two out of three Satellite Earth Stations in Sri Lanka are also situated in Padukka. Today Padukka is also famous for having a number of rubber estates while there are substantial amounts of graphite deposits in and around the area. The highest mountain in the Colombo district, Udagama Kanda (1492 ft) lies near Padukka.

Newly built Padukka Sathi Pola (weekly fair) opened in 2014 at town itself. Branches of Bank of Ceylon, People's Bank, Hatton National Bank, Commercial Bank & Sampath Bank are situated at Padukka.

== Maps ==
- https://www.google.lk/maps/place/Padukka/@6.8436433,80.1011896,14z/data=!3m1!4b1!4m2!3m1!1s0x3ae252b4e771f95f:0x7b8423cfccab27b7?hl=en
