= Ja-Ela Urban Council =

Ja-Ela Urban Council ජා-ඇල නගර සභාව ஜா-எல நகர சபை

Type
- Type: Local authority

Leadership
- Mayor: Shammi Roshan Nonis, (NPP) since (6 May 2025)
- Deputy Chairman: Deshan Miyuranga, (NPP) since (6 May 2025)

Structure
- Seats: 17
- Political groups: Government: NPP (9); Opposition: SJB (4); UNP (1); SLPP (1); PA (1); Independents (1)

Elections
- Last election: 6 May 2025
- Next election: TBA

Ja-Ela Urban Council (JUC) is the local authority for the town of Ja-Ela in Gampaha District Sri Lanka. JUC is responsible for providing a variety of local public services including roads, sanitation, drains, housing, libraries, public parks and recreational facilities.
