= Udagama Kanda =

Mountain in Sri Lanka

Udagama Kanda, (Sinhala: උදාගම කන්ද) is a mountain in Sri Lanka, situated in Padukka Division, Colombo District, Western Province.

It is the highest mountain in the district reaching a height of 455 m (1,492 ft) above sea level. Geologically, it is composed primarily of metamorphic gneiss and granite, characteristic of Sri Lanka's Precambrian basement rocks.

Udagama Kanda functions as a primary catchment area for the Labugama Reservoir, constructed in 1886, and the Kalatuwawa Reservoir, constructed in 1955. These reservoirs collectively supply drinking water to over 1 million residents in the Greater Colombo region through the National Water Supply and Drainage Board system.

Udagama Kanda forms a core part of the Labugama-Kalatuwawa Forest Strict Reserve, a protected area established to safeguard the surrounding ecosystem and watershed. The reserve, gazetted under Sri Lanka's conservation framework, encompasses the mountain's slopes and extends across approximately 2,150 ha (5,300 acres), with the primary objective of maintaining watershed integrity for downstream water resources. The reserve is home to wild cats, foxes, deer, sambhur, wild boar, wild hare and porcupines.

The village of Udagama is also on the slopes of the mountain. The name "Udagama" originates from the Sinhalese term "uda", meaning upper or high, reflecting the village's elevated position relative to the surrounding lowlands and its prominence in the local landscape.

== See also ==
- Geography of Sri Lanka
- List of mountains in Sri Lanka
