= Kelani Valley line =

Railway line in Sri Lanka

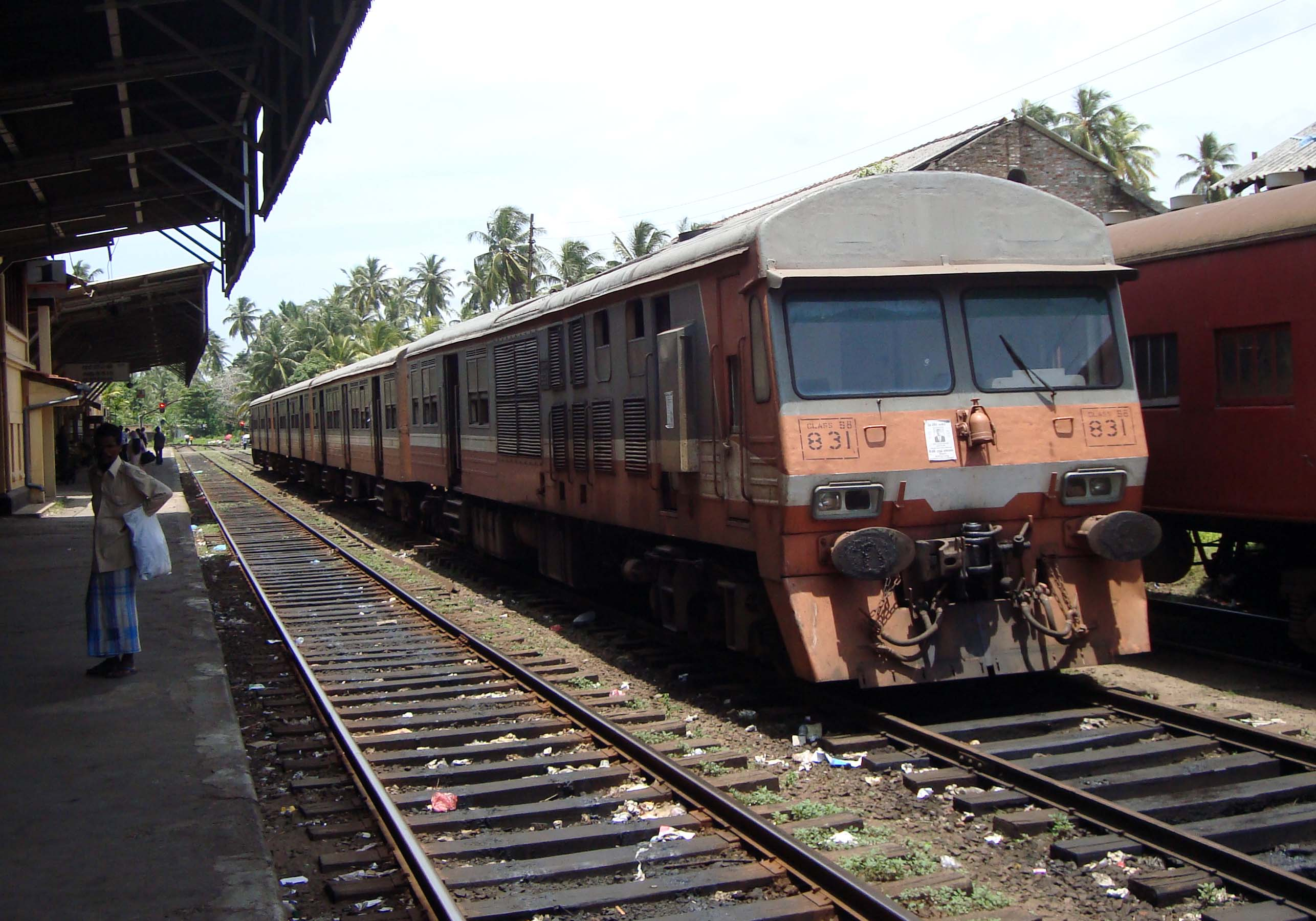
- Class S8 DMUs do most of runs on the Kelani Valley line

Overview
- Status: Operational
- Locale: Sri Lanka
- Termini: Colombo Fort; Avissawella
- Stations: 25

Service
- Type: Regional rail
- System: Sri Lanka Railways
- Operator(s): Sri Lanka Railways
- Depot(s): Maradana

History
- Opened: 1902 (as narrow gauge)
- Closed: 1992 (to start gauge conversion)
- Reopened: 1996 (as broad gauge)

Technical
- Number of tracks: Single track
- Track gauge: 1,676 mm (5 ft 6 in)
- Old gauge: 2 ft 6 in (762 mm)
- Electrification: No

The Kelani Valley railway line in Sri Lanka, covering the breadth of Colombo District. The line is owned, maintained, and operated by Sri Lanka Railways.

== Route definition and overview ==
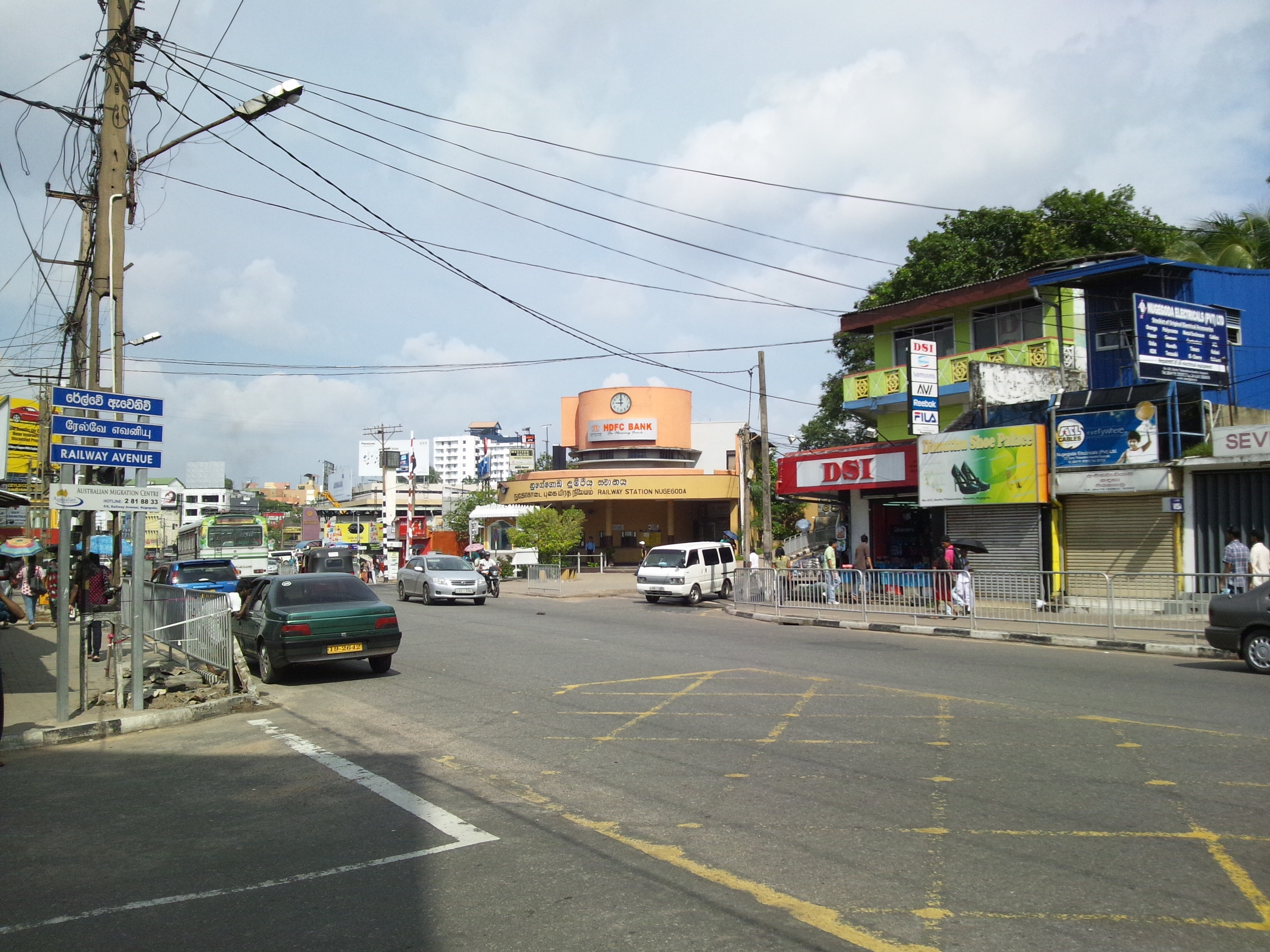
Nugegoda railway station

The Kelani Valley line runs southeast from Colombo Maradana Station, through much of the city of Colombo. It runs through major business centres, like Nugegoda and Maharagama, before turning eastwards. It crosses the Southern Expressway near Homagama and continues east towards Avissawella, the current terminus of the line. The line serves an increasingly urbanising community.

Major railway stations on the line are Colombo Fort, Maradana, Narahenpita, Nugegoda, Maharagama, Pannipitiya, Kottawa, Homagama, Meegoda, Padukka, Waga, Kosgama, and Avissawella.

== History ==
=== Narrow-gauge era ===
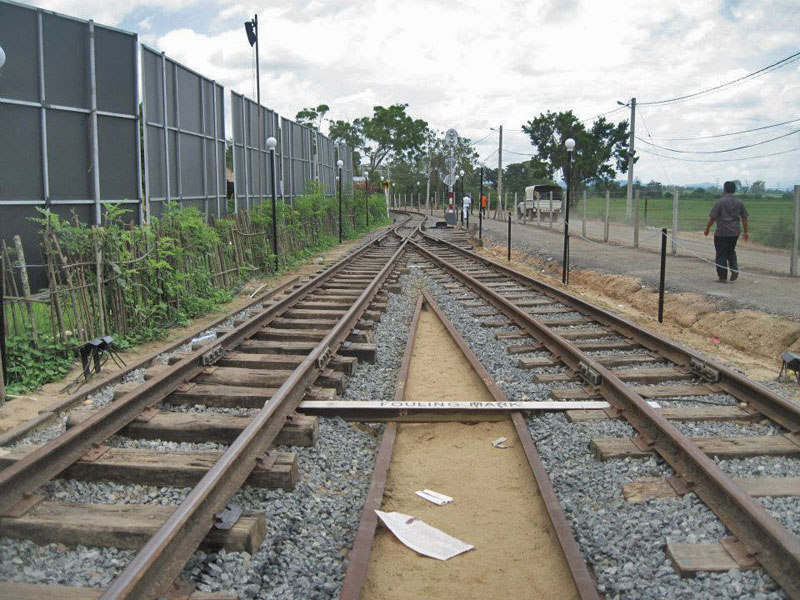
An exhibit of narrow-gauge line

The Kelani Valley line was originally built from Colombo to Yatiyanthota via Avissawella during 1900–1902. It was branched off at Avissawella and extended up to Opanayaka via Ratnapura (completed in 1912). It was officially opened for service in 1919. Originally built as a 2 ft 6 in (762 mm) narrow-gauge line to serve the rubber plantations in the area, the railway line between Avissawella and Yatiyanthota was removed in 1942, the line from Homagama to Opanayaka abandoned in 1973.

The services were restarted up to Avissawella in 1978.

=== Gauge conversion ===
In 1992, a project was started to convert the line to 1,676 mm (5 ft 6 in). The project was finally completed up to Avissawella (58 km or 36 mi) in 1996. The tracks beyond were completely dismantled leaving only ruined stations, bridges, and bunds.

== Infrastructure ==
The Kelani Valley line is entirely single track, at 1,676 mm (5 ft 6 in). As train frequency increases, it is becoming increasingly challenging to operate trains running both direction on the single-line track.

Currently the line serves an increasingly urbanizing population leading up to Avissawella. The Kelani Valley line is not electrified. All services run on diesel power. Current operating speeds are limited due to the sharp curves on the line.

=== Locomotives and rolling stock ===
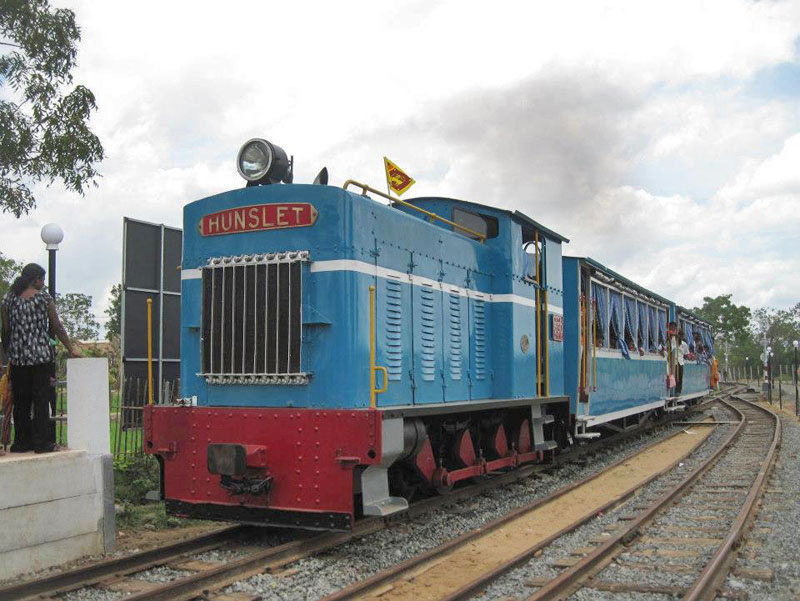
A Class P1 locomotive in Deyata Kirula exhibition

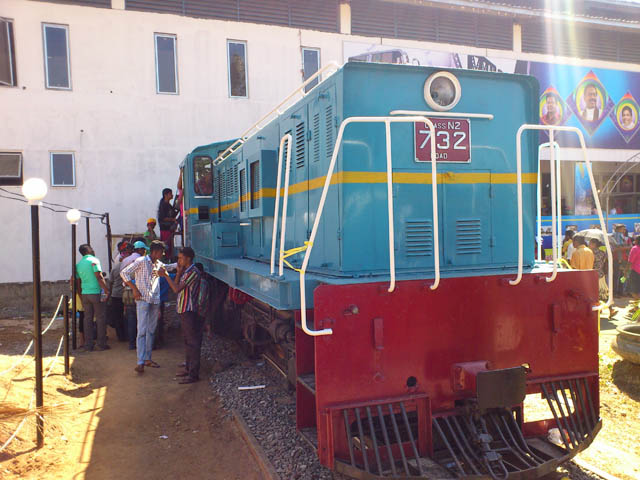
Class N2 narrow-gauge locomotive

During the narrow-gauge era, the line had its own fleet of narrow-gauge locomotives and rolling stock. The steam locomotives of Class K and Sentinel railcars class V1 and V2 were also used.

Class	Horse power	Manufacturer	Engine	Transmission	Livery	Imported year
N1	492	Krupp	8 cylinder powered	Hydraulic	Red	1953
N2	600	Kawasaki Japan	General Motors Detroit diesel v16	Hydraulic	Blue & red	1973
P1	132	Hunslet	Ruston Hornsby 6 cylinder	Mechanical	Green	1950

Currently, the line is operated with broad-gauged S8 diesel multiple units.

Class	Horse power	Manufacturer	Engine	Transmission	Livery	Imported year	Notes
S6	1165	Hitachi (Japan)	Paxman V12-12YJXL (4 stroke)	Diesel hydraulic	Formerly Red, then Orange with White stripes (similar to the S8 livery)	1975	Not in use.
S7	1020	Hitachi (Japan)	Cummins V8 KTA-2300 (4 stroke)	Diesel hydraulic	Green	1977	Not in use
S8	1430	Hitachi (Japan) & Hyundai (S. Korea)	MTU 12V396TCI13	Diesel hydraulic	Orange, white, and gray	1991	

== Planned extension to Hambantota ==
Sri Lanka Railways is planning to restore the Kelani Valley Line up to Opanayake through Kuruvita, Ratnapura and Kahawatta and to augment the line with a broad gauge via Embilipitiya and Suriyawewa to the port of Hambantota by 2030.

== Operation ==
Sri Lanka Railways has a monopoly on the operation of Kelani Valley line.

As of January 2016, there were 20 trains operating on the line daily, mainly catering to rush hour commuters traveling to and from Colombo. In addition to this, Sri Lanka Railways introduced a rail bus service to cater commuters traveling between Kosgama and Maharagama during daytime.

== See also ==
- Sri Lanka Railways
- Railway stations in Sri Lanka
- Diesel locomotives of Sri Lanka
