= Puttalam railway station =

Railway station in Puttalam, Sri Lanka

Coordinates: 8.0227°N 79.8379°E

Puttalam Railway Station
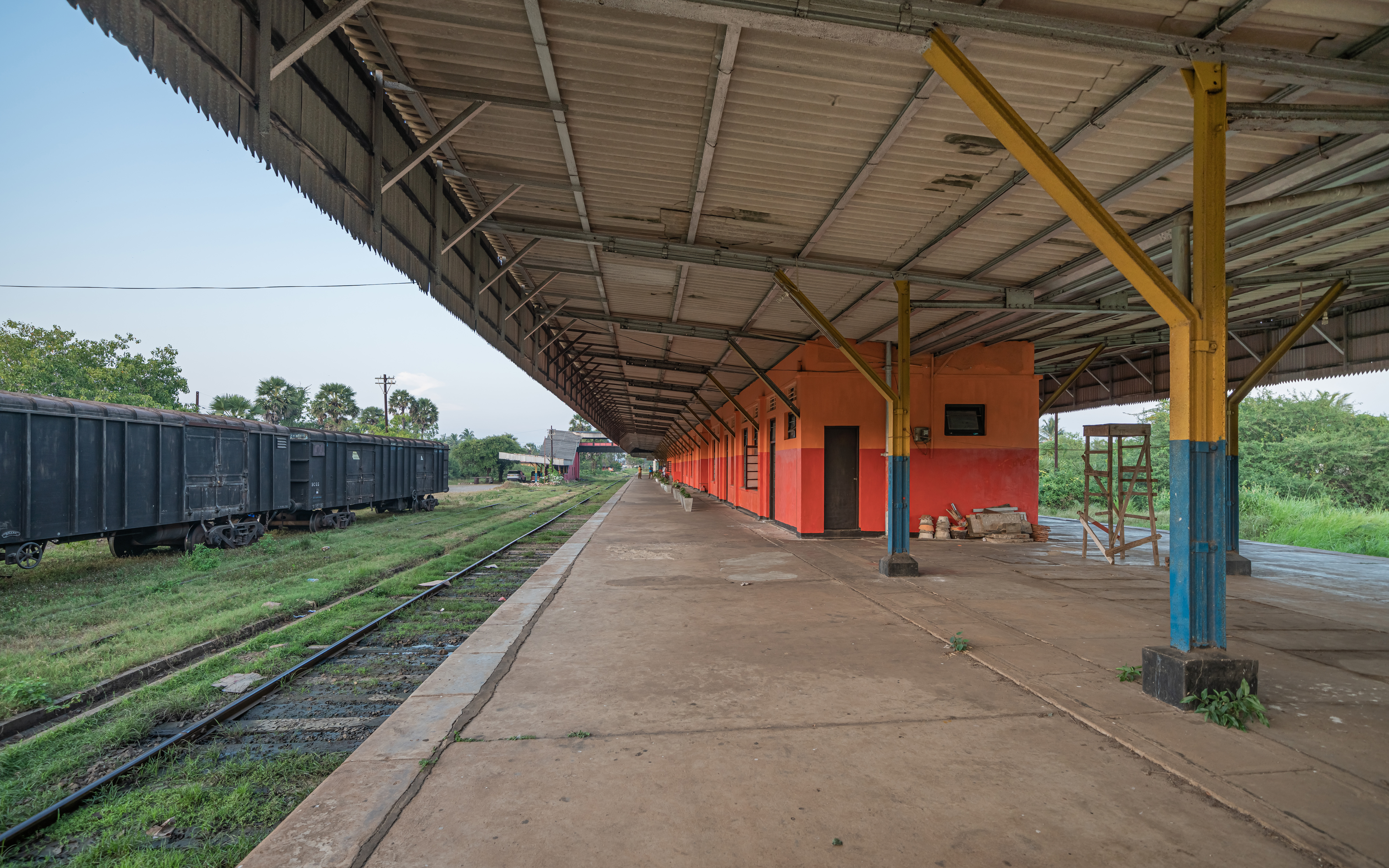

General information
- Location: Puttalam; Sri Lanka
- Owner: Sri Lanka Railways
- Line: Puttalam Line
- Platforms: two side platforms

Other information
- Status: functioning
- Station code: PTM

History
- Opened: 12 May 1926
- Rebuilt: 1946
Location

Puttalam railway station is a railway station in the Puttalam District, North Western Province, Sri Lanka. The station is served by Sri Lanka Railways, which is the state-run railway operator.

The station is located 135 kilometres (84 mi) from Colombo Fort railway station and 2.04 m (6.7 ft) above sea level.

The station was the original terminus of what was originally known as the North West line. It was officially opened on 12 May 1926.

In 1943 the track from Bangadeniya to Puttalam was removed, as the rails were required on other strategically important routes due to shortages caused by World War II. It was re-laid in 1946 with a number of new stations added to the line. As a result, a new railway station was constructed approximately 1.6 km (0.99 mi) south-east of the town centre, with the old station becoming redundant.

== Continuity ==
Preceding station	Sri Lanka Railways	Following station
Thillayadi	Puttalam Line	Noor Nagar

== See also ==
- List of railway stations in Sri Lanka
- List of railway stations in Sri Lanka by line
- Sri Lanka Railways
