= Ja-Ela =

Ja-Ela ජා-ඇල ஜா-எல
- Suburb
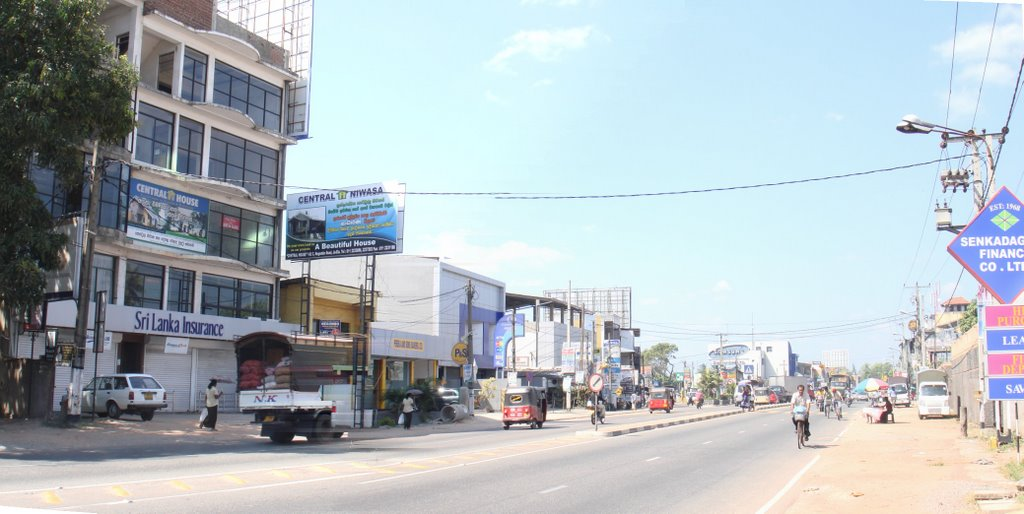
- A Stretch of Ja-Ela town along the Negombo-Colombo Road

- Location within Sri Lanka
- Coordinates: 7°4′0″N 79°53′36″E
- Country: Sri Lanka
- Province: Western Province
- District: Gampaha District

Government
  - Urban Council: Ja-Ela Urban Council
  - Mayor: Syammika Dias (UPFA)
- Time zone: UTC+5:30 (SLST)
- Postal code: 11350
- Area code: 011
- Website: www.jaela.ds.gov.lk

Ja-Ela (Sinhala: ජා-ඇල, Tamil: ஜா-எல) is a town, located approximately 20 km (12 mi) north of the city centre of Colombo, Sri Lanka. Ja-Ela lies on the A3 road which overlaps with the Colombo – Katunayake Expressway at the Ja-Ela Interchange.

== Etymology ==
The etymology of the name is uncertain, and there are several yet arguable interpretations of the name. Howbeit, based on verified historical shreds of evidence, the etymology of the place, Ja Ela is based on both Malay and Sinhala languages. "Ja" and "Javan" are referential terms used by the Sinhalese, Moors & Tamils to address the Malays/Javanese or those of Indonesian descent and the term "Ela" is derived from Sinhala language meaning stream, lake or canal.

== Local government council ==
Ja-Ela is administered by the Ja-Ela Urban Council.

== Populations ==
32,175

== Demographics ==
Majority of the people from Ja-Ela are generally Sinhalese, along with other minority communities such as Tamils, Muslims and Burghers.

The following table summarises the population of Ja-Ela DS Area which covers both urban sectors and rural sectors, according to ethnicity (2012 Census)

| Ethnicity | Population | % of Total |
|---|---|---|
| Sinhalese | 186,086 | 92.34% |
| Sri Lankan Moors | 853 | 0.423% |
| Sri Lankan Tamils | 8,042 | 4% |
| Indian Tamils | 1,236 | 0.613% |
| Burghers | 3,453 | 1.71% |
| Bharatha | 45 | 0.02% |
| Sri Lankan Malays | 1,239 | 0.614% |
| Sri Lankan Chetty | 120 | 0.06% |
| Others | 447 | 0.22% |
| Total | 201,521 | 100% |

Source: Department of Census and Statistics, 2012

Majority of residents belong to the Christian denomination, followed by a large proportion of Buddhists.

Religious composition in Ja-ela DS Division according to 2012 census are as follows Roman Catholics 99,515-49.38%, Buddhists 87,772-43.55%, Other Christians 7,746-3.84%, Hindus 4,235-2.10%, Muslims 2,115-1.05%, Others 138-0.07%.

== Transport ==
This suburb is situated on the main road A3, between Colombo municipality and Negombo municipality. Ja-Ela is situated very close to the Bandaranaike International Airport. There is also a bus stand in Ja-Ela which provides access to Colombo, Negombo, Gampaha. The traffic issues at Ja-Ela have been reduced after the introduction of the Colombo – Katunayake Expressway, which serves an interchange at Ja-Ela.

=== Railway ===
The Ja-Ela railway station is located on the Puttalam line and was opened in 1908. It is the fourth station on the line and is 22.15 km (13.76 mi) from Colombo Fort railway station. The station provides commuter access to the Colombo, Putlam and Chilaw areas. Not only is the station in the heart of the Ja- Ela town, it is also the nearest station to the Negombo-Colombo Main road. Therefore, it is known as one of the most popular stations in the area.

== Schools ==
- Christ King College, Tudella
- Mary Immaculate Convent, Tudella
- St. Maries College, Ja-Ela
- Jayanthi Vidyalaya, Ja-Ela
- King's International College - Kapuwatta

== Geography ==
=== Climate ===
Climate data for Ja-Ela, Sri Lanka
| Month | Jan | Feb | Mar | Apr | May | Jun | Jul | Aug | Sep | Oct | Nov | Dec | Year |
|---|---|---|---|---|---|---|---|---|---|---|---|---|---|
| Mean daily maximum °C (°F) | 30 (86) | 31 (88) | 33 (91) | 34 (93) | 34 (93) | 32 (90) | 32 (90) | 32 (90) | 32 (90) | 31 (88) | 30 (86) | 29 (84) | 32 (90) |
| Mean daily minimum °C (°F) | 22 (72) | 22 (72) | 24 (75) | 26 (79) | 26 (79) | 25 (77) | 24 (75) | 24 (75) | 24 (75) | 24 (75) | 23 (73) | 22 (72) | 24 (75) |
| Average precipitation mm (inches) | 16 (0.6) | 19 (0.7) | 22 (0.9) | 63 (2.5) | 54 (2.1) | 87 (3.4) | 130 (5.1) | 140 (5.5) | 111 (4.4) | 192 (7.6) | 141 (5.6) | 71 (2.8) | 1,046 (41.2) |
| Average precipitation days | 1 | 1 | 2 | 3 | 3 | 2 | 3 | 4 | 5 | 8 | 7 | 4 | 43 |
Source: World Climate Guide. To check the current Weather - Visit: https://www.worldweatheronline.com/ja-ela-weather/western/lk.aspx
