= Avissawella =

Avissawella අවිස්සාවේල්ල அவிசாவளை
- Town
- Location within Colombo District
- Coordinates: 6°57′11″N 80°13′06″E
- Country: Sri Lanka
- Province: Western Province
- District: Colombo District
- Time zone: UTC+5:30 (Sri Lanka Standard Time Zone)
  - Summer (DST): UTC+6 (Summer time)

Avissawella (Sinhala: අවිස්සාවේල්ල, Tamil: அவிசாவளை) is a township in Sri Lanka, governed by an Urban Council, in Colombo District, Western Province, Sri Lanka. It is also known as Sitawakapura, the Old Capital of the Sitawaka Kingdom.

== Overview ==
Avissawella is on the edge of the Western Province, bordering Sabaragamuwa Province. This town was the capital of Sitawaka Kingdom from 1521 to 1593. Seethawaka was ruled by King Mayadunne and later his son Rajasinghe the First during this period. There is a lore that Rajasinghe was a parricide but some historians discount this as a story spread by jealousy.

The Kelani Valley Railway line terminates at Avissawella Railway Station. The town is known for the nearby Kumari waterfall.

This area was previously known as Seethawaka and this name is used to identify a section of this town to this day. Seethawaka river, a tributary of the Kelani river, flows in the outskirts of the city. The city is rapidly transforming into an industrial city with the establishment of the Seethawaka Export Promotion Zone (industrial zone) during late 1990s. After this Zone was established, the population of Avissawella increased rapidly due to migrant workers and resultant increase in residents.

== See also ==
- List of railway stations in Sri Lanka
- Kelani Valley Railway Line
