= DFH =

DFH may refer to

- Dong Fang Hong, a Chinese space satellite program
- China Railways DFH shunting locomotives
- China Railways DFH mainline locomotives
- Discovery Fit and Health, a television network owned by Discovery Communications
- Dynamic frequency hopping, in wireless networking
- Deutsch-Französische Hochschule, German for Franco-German University
- Daughter from Hell, 2026 album by Gracie Abrams

== See also ==
- Dong Fang Hong (disambiguation)
