= Dong Fang Hong (disambiguation) =

Dong Fang Hong was a space satellite program in the People's Republic of China.

Dong Fang Hong ("the East is red") may also refer to:

- Dong Fang Hong 1, China's first satellite
- Dong Fang Hong 2, a geostationary television satellite
- China Railway Dong Fang Hong locomotives:
  - China Railways DFH shunting locomotives
  - China Railways DFH mainline locomotives
- A subdistrict of Yuelu District, Changsha
- Dongfanghong Square in Lanzhou
- Dongfanghong BJ760, a Chinese car made by BAW, since 1960s.

== See also ==
- The East Is Red (disambiguation)
