= CRRC Qingdao Sifang =

Chinese rail rolling stock manufacturer

CRRC Qingdao Sifang Co., Ltd.
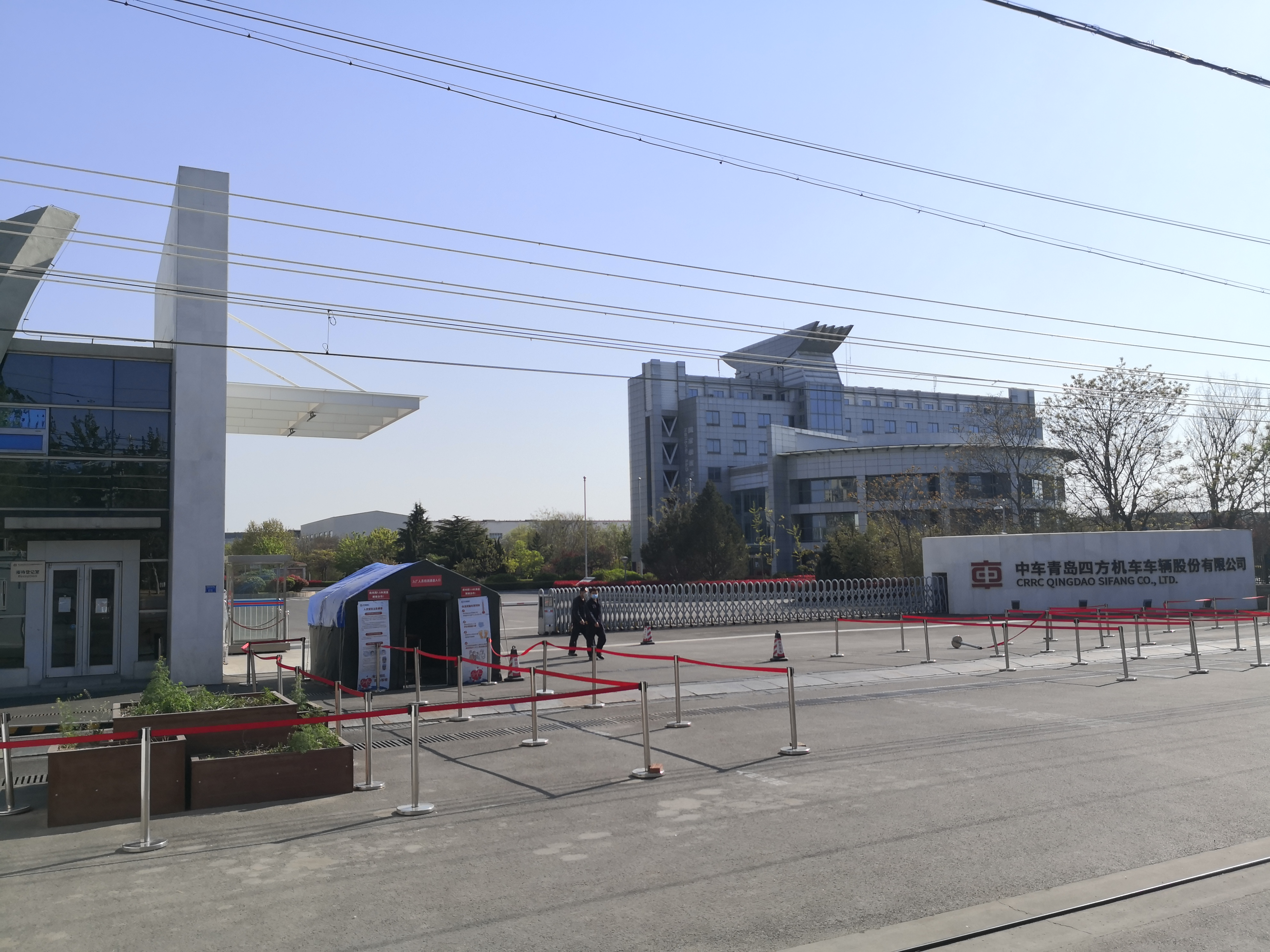
- Gate of Qingdao Sifang Jihongtan Manufacturing Base
- Native name: 中车青岛四方机车车辆股份有限公司
- Formerly: CSR Qingdao Sifang Co., Ltd.
- Type: Subsidiary
- Industry: Railway – rolling stock
- Founded: 1900 (as Syfang General Repair Works); July 22, 2002 (as CRRC Qingdao Sifang Co., Ltd.)
- Headquarters: Qingdao, Shandong, China
- Parent: CRRC
- Website: crrcgc.cc/sfgfen

CRRC Qingdao Sifang Co., Ltd. (Chinese: 中车青岛四方机车车辆股份有限公司; lit. 'CRRC Qingdao Sifang Locomotive & Rolling Stock Co. Ltd.') is a Chinese rolling stock manufacturer based in Qingdao, Shandong. Founded in 1900 during the German occupation, Qingdao Sifang is one of the oldest rolling stock manufacturers in China.

== History ==
The main building of Shantung Railway Syfang General Repair Works. Steel structure, built in the 1900s.

=== Qing Dynasty and the Republic of China Era ===
==== Founding of the Syfang General Repair Works ====
Following the Juye Incident, the German army landed at Tsingtao in 1897. In 1898, the Qing government signed the Jiao'ao Concession Treaty with Germany, which made Tsingtao a German colony. This treaty also granted the German government the right to build the Jiaoji Railway and develop the mineral deposits along the route.

Kaiser Wilhelm II was determined to make Tsingtao a "model colony" and a bridgehead for the German army in the Far East. As a result, German authorities built a number of factories in Tsingtao between 1900 and 1910. In October 1900, while building the Jiaoji Railway, German authorities began constructing the Shantung Railway Syfang General Repair Works (Hauptreparatur-Werkstätte Syfang der Schantung-Eisenbahn), which was under the Shantung Railway Company (Schantung-Eisenbahn-Gesellschaft), with a total investment of 1,587,000 marks. It became China's third rolling stock factory after Tangshan and Dalian. The factory was located near the Sifang Railway Station in Sifang Village, with more than 10,000 square meters of factory spaces and more than 400 workers, and was completed in 1902. Locomotive parts were imported from Germany and assembly was conducted by the Sifang plant. By 1914, a total of 1,148 locomotives, coaches, and wagons had been assembled or repaired.

==== Times of turmoil ====
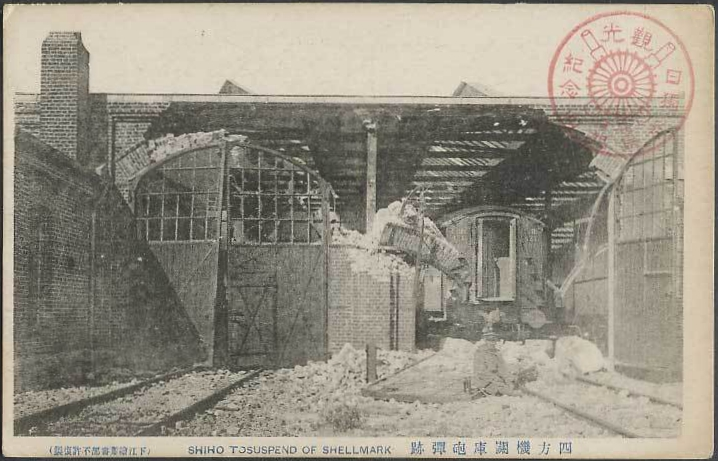
Damaged Sifang Workshop after the Siege of Tsingtao.

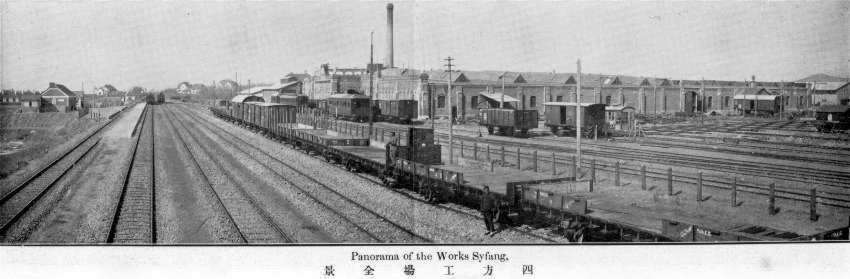
Panoramic view of the Syfang Workshop in 1914. The building on the left was the Syfang Railway Station.

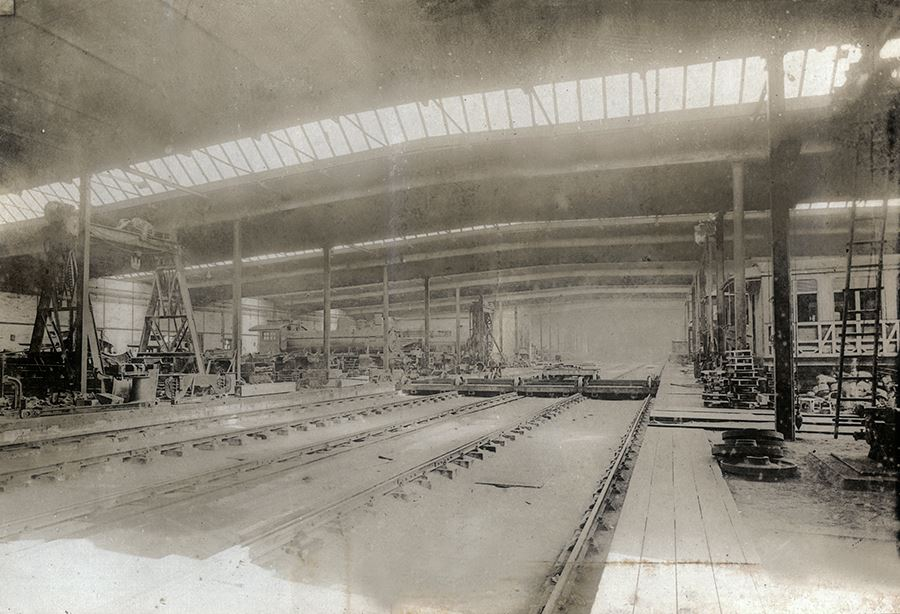
Interior view of the factory during the first Japanese occupation.

In 1914, the First World War broke out, and Germany was occupied with war at the homefront. Japan and the United Kingdom took the opportunity and launched the Siege of Tsingtao. The Shantung Railway Syfang General Repair Works was damaged during the siege. In 1915, the Empire of Japan forced the Republic of China government to accept its Twenty-One Demands, which affirmed Japan's takeover of the German territories and railroad assets in Shantung. The Syfang General Repair Works was renamed Shantung Railway Syfang Workshop, which was temporarily managed by the Japanese Army. In March 1915, the Japanese army in Tsingtao established the Shantung Railway Administration, which had five departments: general affairs, transportation, engineering, accounting and mining, and the Tsingtao Workshop. During the Japanese occupation, additional facilities such as sand casting factories, passenger wagon yards, wheel factories, copper casting yards were built, and the number of employees reached more than 1,500.

==== Pre-PRC to 1949 ====
In 1938 the Beiyang government took over control of the rolling stock manufacturer but constant political turmoil left railway development on hold until 1949.

==== Local growth and beyond ====
After 1949 the facility became Sifang Works and in 1952 produced China's first indigenous steam locomotive, August 1st, then through the 1960s and 1970s became a supplier to China Railway passenger cars and later expanded to export markets by the 1980s.

== Products and services ==
=== Historic rolling stock ===
- China Railway DF4 (B/C/E variants) diesel-electric locomotive
- DFH4 diesel-hydraulic locomotive
- DFH1 and DFH3 diesel-hydraulic locomotive
- DFH2, DFH5, DFH21 diesel-hydraulic shunters
- Dongfeng DMU (2 car set)

=== High speed trains ===
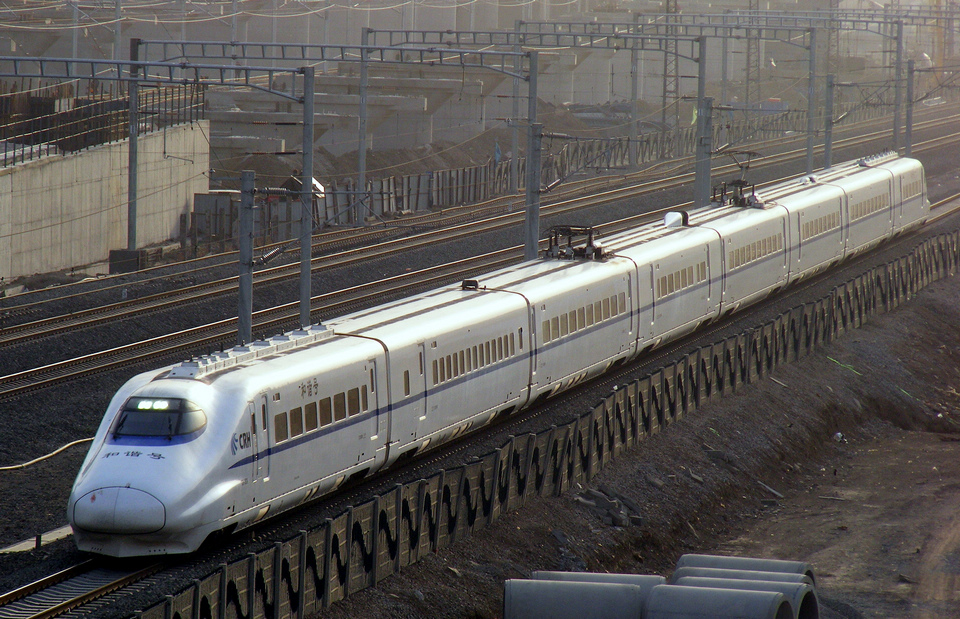
CRH2A EMU

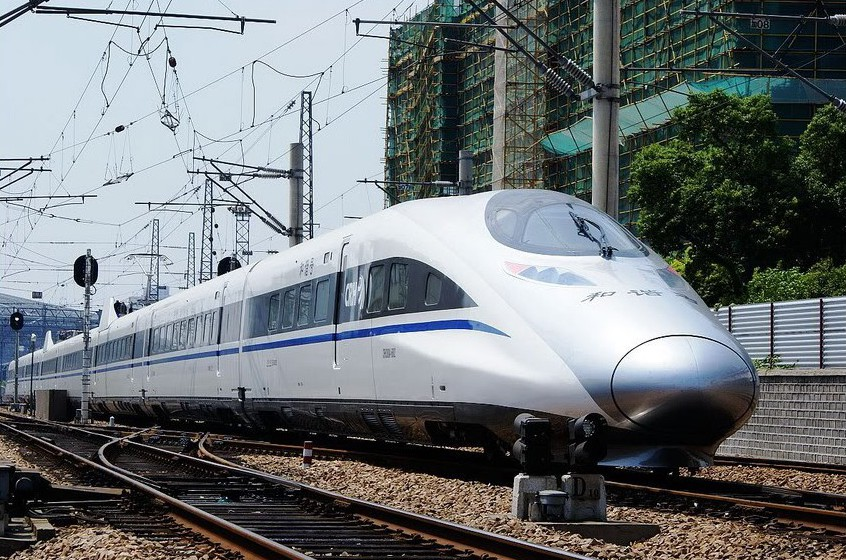
CRH380A EMU

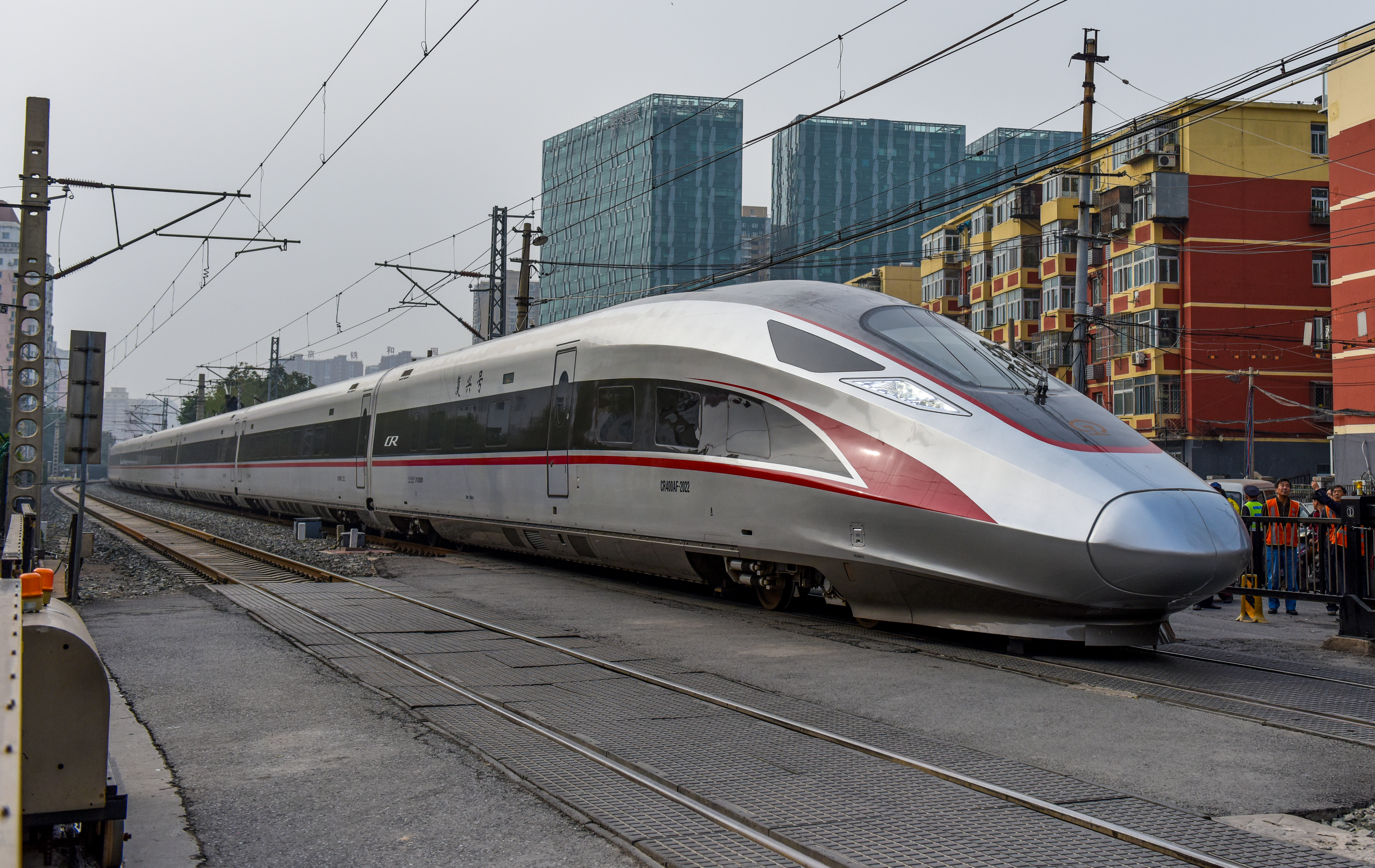
CR400AF EMU

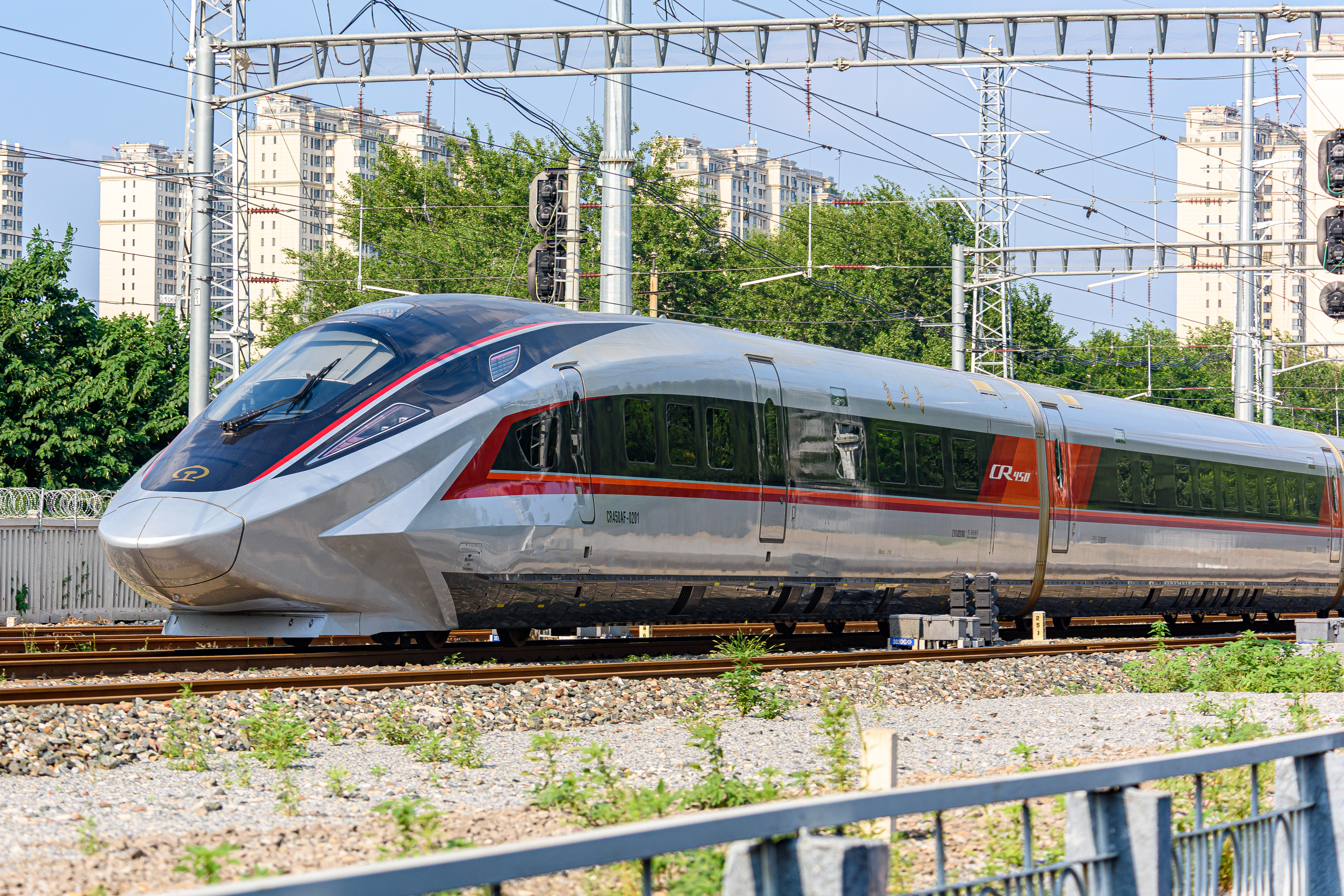
CR450AF EMU

- China Railway
  - CRH1 as a joint venture between Bombardier Transportation
  - CRH2 as a partly joint venture between Kawasaki Heavy Industries (KHI)
  - CRH380A
  - CR400AF
  - CR450AF
  - CRRC 600 (maglev)
- MTR Corporation
  - Vibrant Express
- Kereta Cepat Indonesia China
  - KCIC400AF (derived version of CR400AF)

=== Metro ===
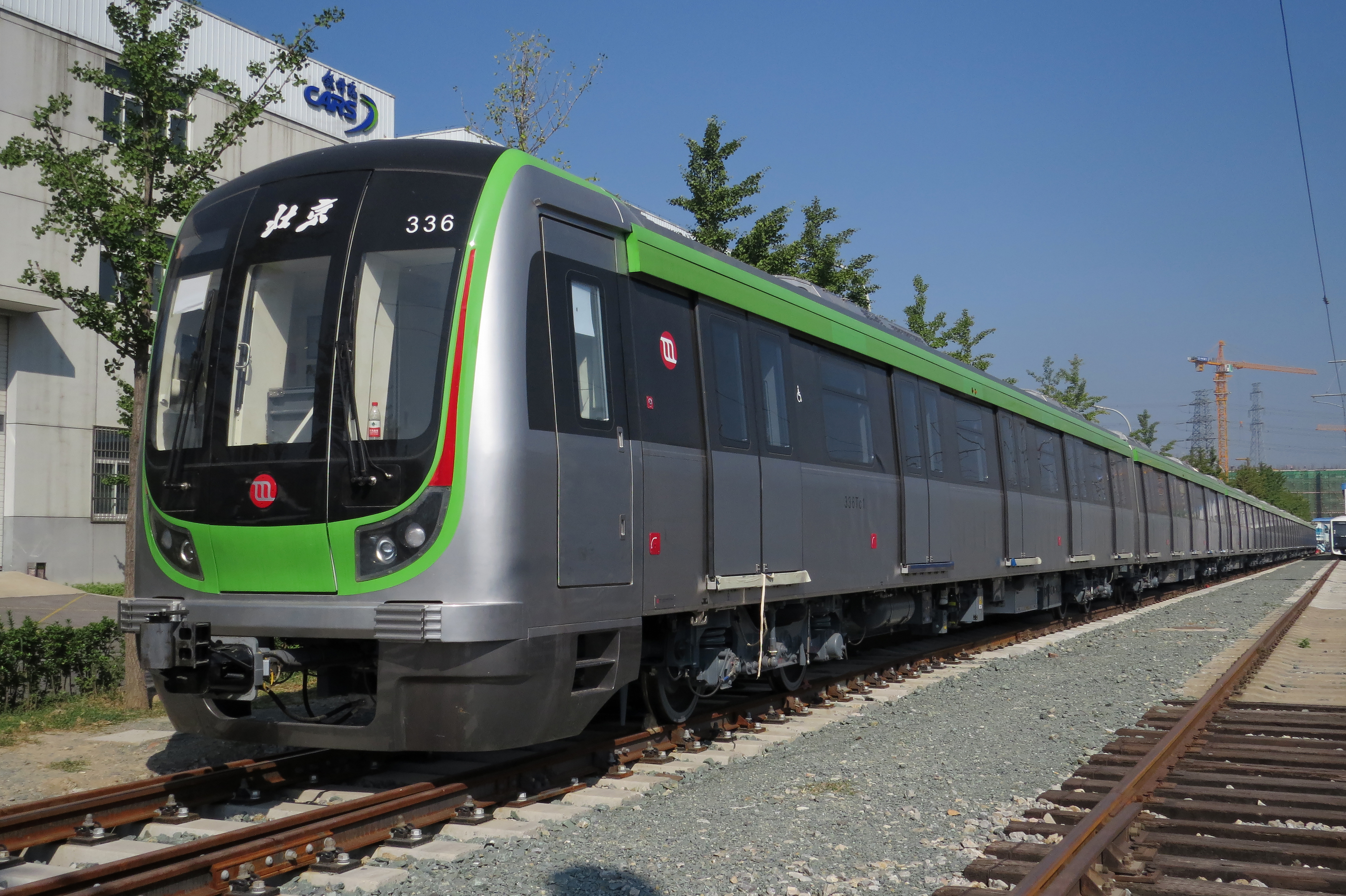
CRRC Qingdao Sifang-built 8A trainset for Beijing Subway Line 16

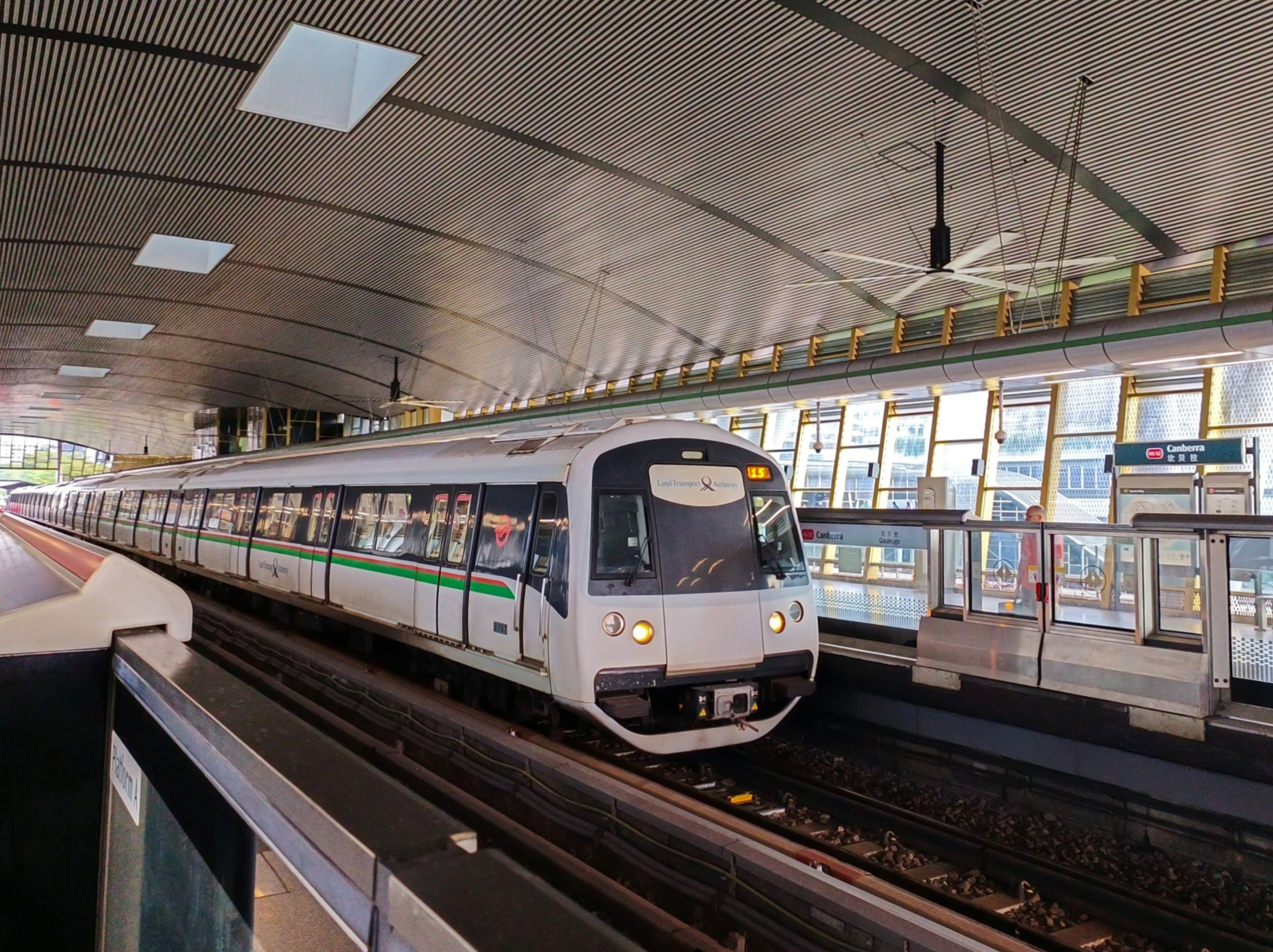
Kawasaki Heavy Industries & CRRC Qingdao Sifang C151C train arriving at Canberra station, Singapore

- Beijing Subway
  - Line 1, Line 4, Daxing line, Line 8, Line 14, Line 16, Line 17, Batong line, Changping line, Daxing Airport Express
- Guangzhou Metro
  - Line 4, Line 5 and Line 6 in a joint venture with Kawasaki Heavy Industries
- Zhengzhou Metro
  - Line 1
- MTR Corporation (Hong Kong)
  - MTR Urban Lines Vision Train
  - MTR Lantau Airport Railway Vision Train
  - MTR Disneyland Resort Lines Vision Train
- Chengdu Metro
  - Line 1 (Chengdu Metro)
  - Line 2 (Chengdu Metro)
- Shenyang Metro
  - Line 2 (Shenyang Metro)
- Tianjin Metro
  - Line 3 (Tianjin Metro), Line 6 (Tianjin Metro)
- Singapore Mass Rapid Transit
  - North South MRT line, East West MRT line, Thomson-East Coast MRT line, Cross Island MRT line
    - Kawasaki Heavy Industries & CRRC Qingdao Sifang C151A
    - Kawasaki Heavy Industries & CRRC Qingdao Sifang C151B
    - Kawasaki Heavy Industries & CRRC Qingdao Sifang T251
    - Kawasaki Heavy Industries & CRRC Qingdao Sifang C151C
    - CRRC Qingdao Sifang CR151
- Qingdao Metro
- Shenzhen Metro
  - Line 13
- Chongqing Rail Transit
  - Line 4, Line 5, Line 10
- Chicago Transit Authority
  - 7000 series (CTA)

=== Intercity commuter ===
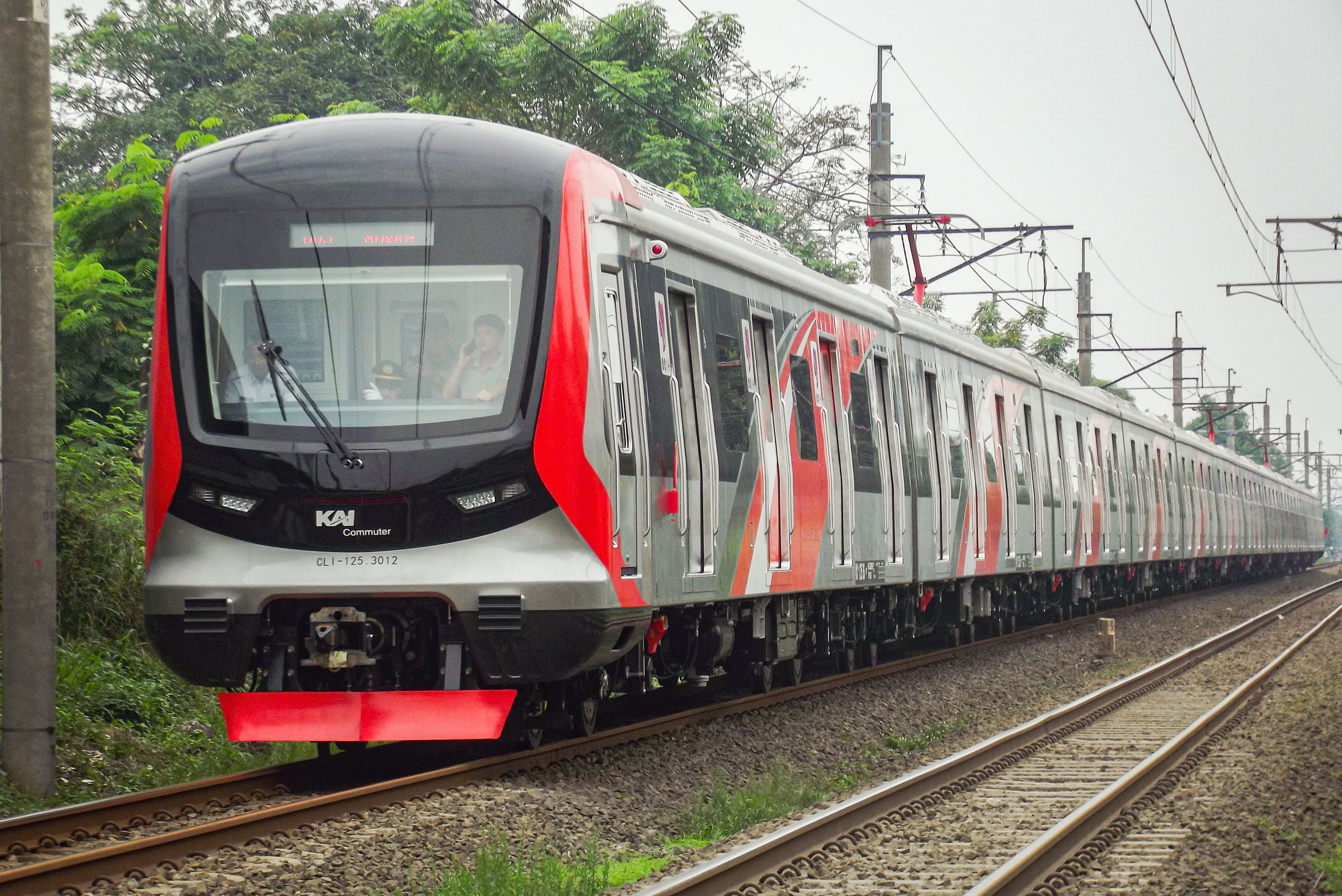
KCI-SFC120-V series entering Tambun Station on Cikarang Loop Line.

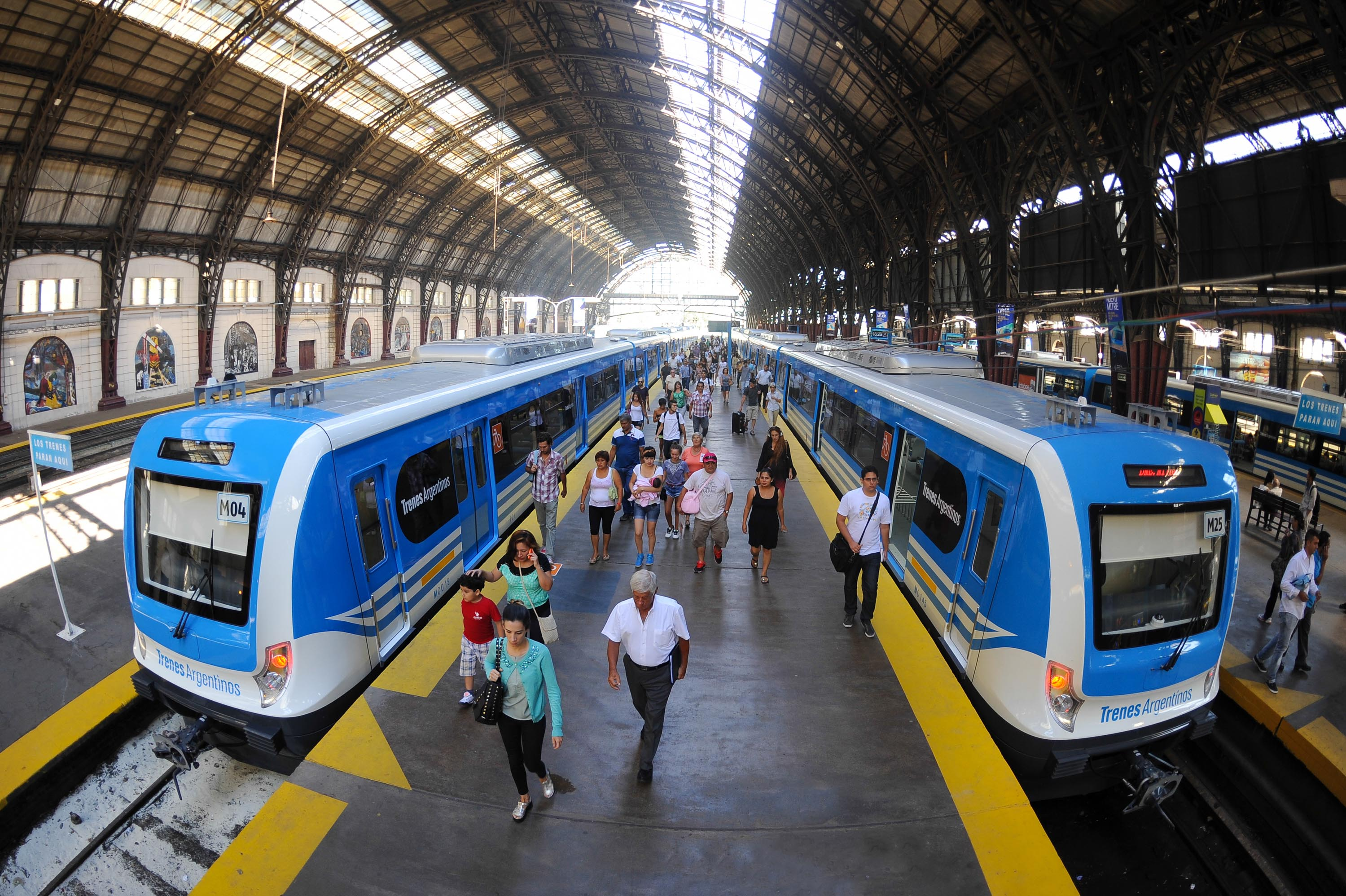
CSR EMUs at Retiro Mitre railway station in Buenos Aires.

- China Railway
  - CRH6
- KAI Commuter
  - KCI-SFC120-V
- Trenes Argentinos
  - CSR EMU (Argentina)
- São Paulo Metropolitan Trains
  - 2500 Series fleet
- Cairo LRT
  - CRRC EMU
- Empresa de los Ferrocarriles del Estado (EFE)
  - SFE/SFD Series
  - SFB-500 Series

=== Light rail vehicles ===
- Qingdao Tram
  - zh:青岛有轨电车 as a joint venture with Škoda Transportation

=== Coaches and passenger cars ===
- China Railway
  - zh:中国铁路25T型客车 as a partly joint venture between Bombardier Transportation
- Coaches for Turkmenistan
- SEPTA
  - Multi-level cars (manufactured in China and finally assembly in Springfield, MA) for SEPTA Regional Rail lines (order cancelled in April 2024) 4 Pilot cars including 2422 were being built or completed in China.

=== Diesel multiple units ===
- Costa Rica Interurban Line
- Iraqi Republic Railways
- Sri Lanka Railways
  - Sri Lanka Railways S9
  - Sri Lanka Railways S10
  - Sri Lanka Railways S12
  - Sri Lanka Railways S14 & S14A

=== Research and development projects ===
- prototype of permanent magnet straddled-type monorail train in 2016.
- prototype of 100 km/h (62 mph) monorail train in 2020.
- prototype of suspended type monorail train in 2017.
- manufacture of bi-level cars

== Joint ventures ==
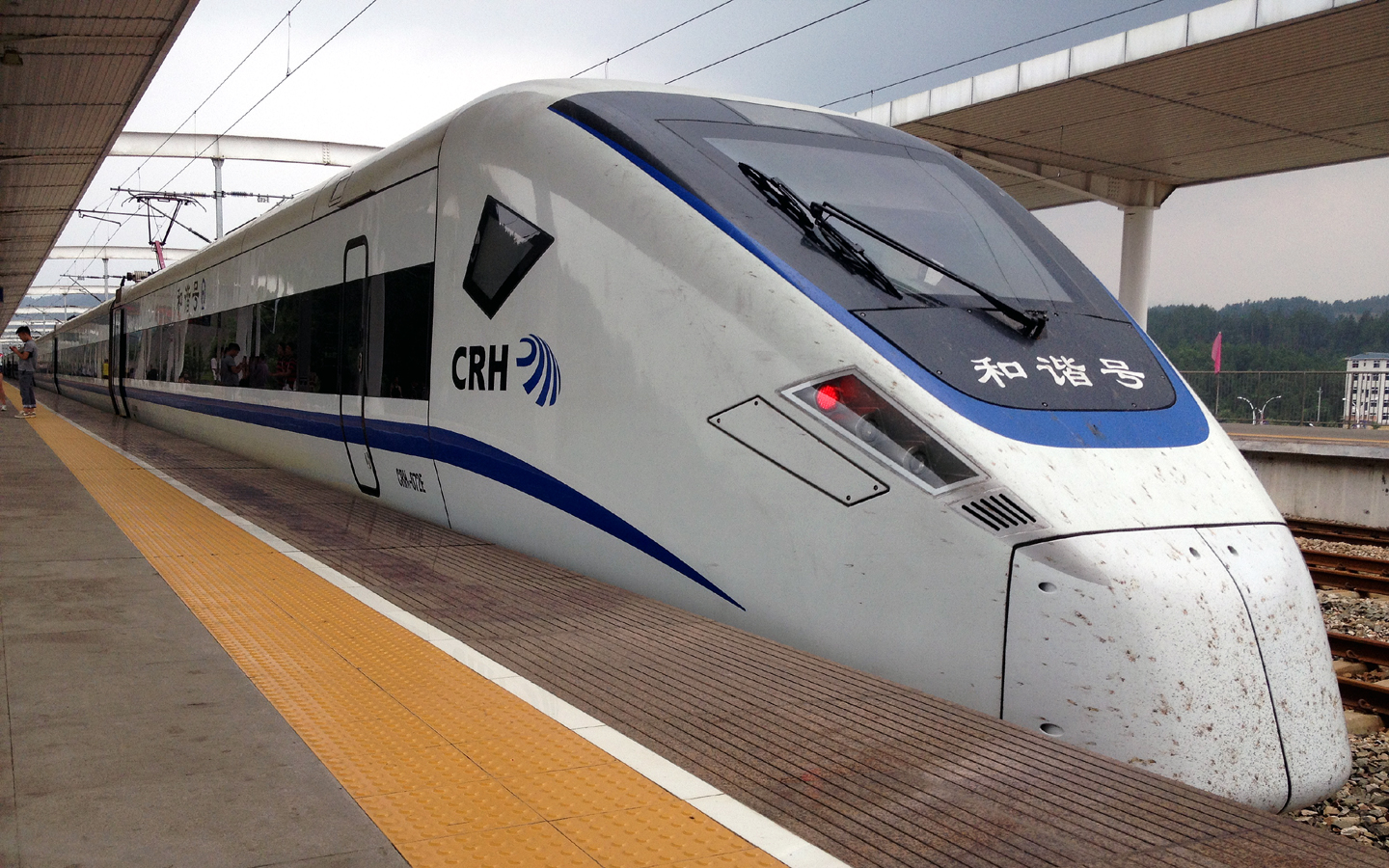
CRH1E

=== Bombardier Sifang (Qingdao) Transportation Ltd ===
Bombardier Sifang (Qingdao) Transportation Ltd was established in 1998 as a joint venture between Bombardier Transportation (Germany) and Sifang Locomotive and rolling stock company limited as a company for the production of high speed trains and high quality coaches. This joint venture includes a new IS development named JOSS (joint venture operating system support).

By 2009 it had delivered over 1000 units, including the CRH1E (Zefiro 250) high speed sleeper trains, and had secured an order for 80 CRH380D (Zefiro 380) very high speed trains in an order estimated to be worth €2.7 billion ($4 billion, 27.4billion RMB) in total.

=== Kawasaki Railcar with CRRC Qingdao Sifang Co., Ltd ===
Kawasaki Railcar Manufacturing co-operated with CRRC Qingdao Sifang Co, Ltd. in 2009 to produce the C151A trains, the fourth generation MRT train for SMRT Trains, in Singapore. A total of 22 trainsets were built with 6 carriages each. By 2010, half of the trainsets were completed, and testing was done in 2011 by Kawasaki, before full delivery in December 2011. These trains now serve the North South line and East West line in Singapore. In 2013, a further order of another 78 cars (13 trainsets) of C151A trains was made, which were delivered by 2014.

Kawasaki and CRRC Qingdao Sifang also collaborated to manufacture the new 270 cars (45 trainsets) of C151B trains, which were delivered from 2015 to 2017. Another 72 cars (12 trainsets) of C151C trains were also later added, and delivered from 2017 to 2019.

In 2013, Kawasaki planned to sue CRRC Qingdao Sifang for patent infringement after their partnership was dissolved. Kawasaki said it deeply regretted entering into the partnership. Kawasaki subsequently dropped the action.

Nevertheless, in 2014, the consortium of Kawasaki and CRRC Qingdao Sifang collaborated again and won the tender to produce 364 cars (91 trainsets of 4 cars each) of T251 trains for the Thomson–East Coast MRT line. These trains were to be fully automated and driverless, and also the first trains in Singapore to have 5 doors in each carriage. These 91 trains were delivered from 2018 to 2022.

In 2017, the consortium also submitted a bid for the contract R151 to produce 66 new trains intended to replace the first-generation C151 trains for the North-South and East-West lines, but were unsuccessful in securing the contract, losing out to Bombardier Transportation.

From December 2024, the C151B Set 649/650 EMU taken out of revenue service and sent to CRRC Sifang in Qingdao, China for repair works, than after re-delivery to Singapore & arrived at Bishan Depot. train featuring a notably without pixelated livery and pasted with red colour bands, inspired by Singapore flag. Firstly, KSF Proof of concept train were revenue service from June 2026.

==== Issues with C151A trains ====
On 5 July 2016, a Hong Kong Based non-profit news organization FactWire broke the news of Kawasaki C151A trains suffering from multiple defects. These defects were related to the Chinese-made materials of the train, with the entire investigative works being posted to YouTube. Most of its claims were subsequently acknowledged by the rail operator SMRT and the Land Transport Authority. The allegations generated significant controversy and uproar in Hong Kong and Singapore, with the quality of the Chinese-made trains being put into question.

=== Astra Vagoane with CRRC Qingdao Sifang ===
On 9 September 2020 Bucharest City Hall sent to the Association Astra Vagoane (Romania) – CRRC Qingdao Sifang (China) a "Communication on the outcome of the award procedure for Purchase of 100 trams. By this address, the mentioned association is notified that the winner of the procurement procedure has been designated and that it will be informed of the date and time when the contract will be signed."

The town hall will pay 840 million Romanian lei (200 million USD) for 100 ASTRA trams.
