= Dongfeng DMU =

First diesel multiple unit built in China

Dongfeng
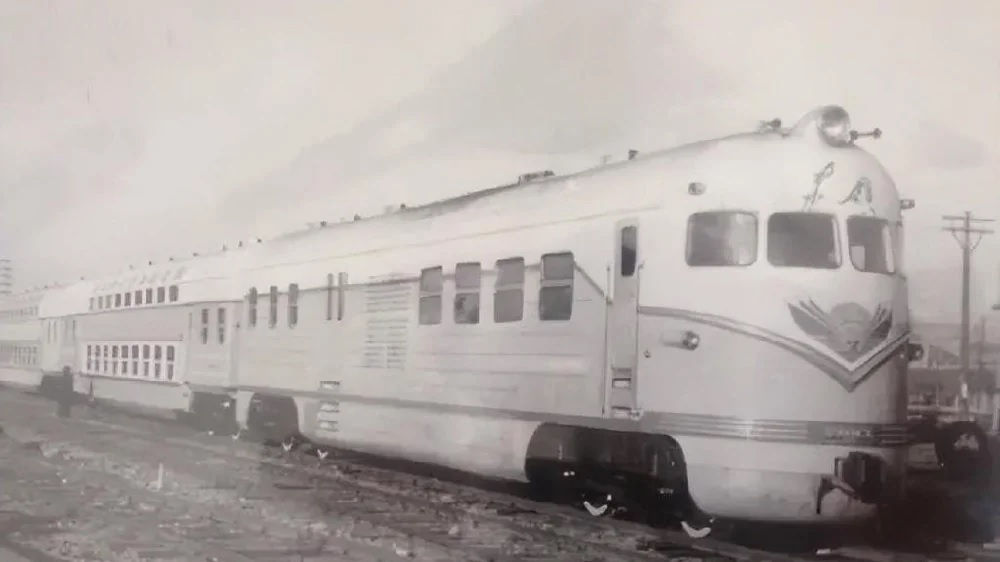
- A Dongfeng diesel multiple unit in 1958
- Stock type: NM1
- Manufacturer: Qingdao Sifang
- Designers: Sifang Locomotive Factory, Dalian Locomotive, Shanghai Jiaotong University
- Assembly: Qingdao, China
- Constructed: 1958
- Refurbished: 1963, 1968, 1974
- Scrapped: 1982
- Number built: 1 set
- Formation: Mc-T-T-T-T-Mc
- Fleet numbers: Power car: NM1-001–002; Double deck trailer: SK 0001–0004
- Operator: Ministry of Railways

Specifications
- Car length: 20.395 m (66 ft 11 in) (motor car); 24.537 m (80 ft 6 in) (trailer car)
- Width: 3,104 mm (10 ft 2.2 in)
- Height: 4,650 mm (15 ft 3 in)
- Wheel diameter: 1,000 mm (3.3 ft) (motor, new); 915 mm (3.002 ft) (trailer, new)
- Weight: 65,000 kg (143,300 lb) (motor car); 47,500 kg (104,720 lb) (trailer car)
- Axle load: 16.25 tons
- Prime mover: DV12A
- Engine type: four 400 hp (300 kW) (1,200 hp (890 kW) total)
- Transmission: hydraulic
- AAR wheel arrangement: B-B
- Bogies: trailer: 202C
- Seating: 816 total
- Track gauge: 1,435 mm (4 ft 8 1/2 in)

The Dongfeng diesel multiple unit, also known as the Dongfeng motor coach, (Note: Motor coach was a direct translation from the Russian words 'Моторвагонный поезд', which defines a train where some carriages have motors, analogous to the more modern word multiple unit.) and NM1, was a DMU of Ministry of Railways, and was also the first diesel-hydraulic power car and double deck passenger car of China, built by Qingdao Sifang in 1958. The train consisted two motors and four double deck trailers, and was designed for short, commuter services. Each motor has two DV12A high speed diesel engines, and has the SF2006-1 hydraulic transmission. As the set had numerous flaws, it never entered mass production, but the valuable experience gained in the design and manufacturing process was later applied to the DFH1 and Red Star-class locomotive, while the passenger cars designs were later further developed for double deck trains such as the NZJ.

== Development history ==
=== Background ===
In the 1950s, China started swapping steam power on the railways for diesel power. As a result, in August 1956, the China Academy of Railway Sciences developed the first roadmap for technological development of the railways, creating the "1956 to 1967 Railway Technological development plan", which was heavily discussed at the national level, where it was pointed out that the overall development of technology was dependent on developing new traction motors, and thus a need to replace steam locomotives with electric locomotives and diesel locomotives appeared. This determined the direction that the railways would take in the upcoming years. From 1956 to 1958, the First Machine Industry ministry locomotive research bureau, the Ministry of Railways railway development academy undertook research, and developed personnel and taught the operating principles of diesel locomotives, and their design, completing the groundwork for the future development of diesel locomotives.

From 1958, under the encouragement of the Great Leap Forward, the ministry tasked manufacturers and repair bases with the goal of aiming to build diesel locomotives, which included the CRRC February 7th Locomotive, which built the Construction-class locomotive; Dalian locomotive which built the Julong-class locomotive and Qishuyan which built the Xianxing locomotive. In constructing these diesel-electric locomotives, except for the Julong which used the design of the Soviet TE3 locomotive, the other designs all faced difficulties with the transmission. As at the time, China was still rather backwards in building powerful electrical generators, a generator that matched or was close to the output of the diesel motor was not available, so the Jianshe and Xianxing both relied on a reduction gearbox. While Qingdao Sifang also ran into this issue, they opted to take a chance, as hydraulic and electric transmission were simultaneously promoted, and decided to experiment with hydraulic transmission.

In June 1958, Sifang, along with Dalian Locomotive Research Institute, Jiao Tong University and Jining railway sector all proceeded to begin development of the Dongfeng bilevel, hydraulic transmission diesel multiple unit. Design work for the set and the hydraulic transmission was completed on 18 July 1958. In 22 September, with a build time of just two months, Sifang rolled out the first Dongfeng DMU from the production lines. The Dongfeng DMU was also known as the NM1 motor coach, where "N", "M" stands for internal combustion and motor respectively. It was designed for short distance passenger transport, with the motors on either end of the DMU and having a structural maximum speed of 120 km/h (75 mph).

=== Operational history ===
By the end of September 1958, the Dongfeng was delivered to Beijing, for the ninth national railroad worker's exhibition. In 1959, the set was delivered to Beijing bureau, Beijing diesel locomotive sector for operational tests from on the Jingshan railway between Beijing station and Tianjin station at speeds of up to 90 km/h (56 mph). From June 1960, the train entered service officially, running services from Beijing to Liulihe station and Changxindian Railway Station. Due to the lack of experience with hydraulic transmission, there were multiple problems with the structure and properties of the transmission. The hydraulic torque converter was built according to Soviet formulas, which turned out to be inappropriate. In operation, various faults occurred, such as high oil temperatures, out of synchronisation valves, twisted universal joints and so on. In 1961, the two motor cars were removed from service, while the trailers continued in use with Beijing railway sector. In September 1962, the double deck trailers were transferred to Shenyang bureau, Shenyang sector, and became part of a locomotive hauled train.

In March 1963, under the direction of the ministry, the motorcoach returned to Sifang for modifications. These were completed in December 1963, and was assigned to Shanghai bureau, Hangzhou sector. From 5 January 1964, it started on the Shanghai-Hangzhou railway for tests, and started formally carrying passengers from 1 April 1964, running the 93/94 from Shanghai North station to Hangzhou station. From 1978, it was put to use on the Zhegan railway, now part of the Shanghai–Kunming railway, running the 221/222 from Hangzhou—Jinhua—Quzhou. The set underwent further modifications locally with Hangzhou sector from July to September 1969, removing the vertical supports on the upper and lower passenger decks, and replacing the original hopper windows with sliding windows. In 1974, the set returned to Sifang for some modifications, replacing the seats with the same as those on the Type 22 carriage, replacing the sliding bearing on the bogies with roller bearings, and removed the piping for under-car heating.

As the first generation of double deck passenger carriages in China, the design of the set lacked prior experience, and so the operation of these sets revealed multiple problems, such as poor ventilation leading to high temperatures in summer, water leaks reducing the resistance of electrical components, and the corrosion of the structural frame. As a result of these problems, on 16 June 1982, the Dongfeng was withdrawn, and subsequently scrapped.

== Design ==
=== Power car ===
==== Overall layout ====
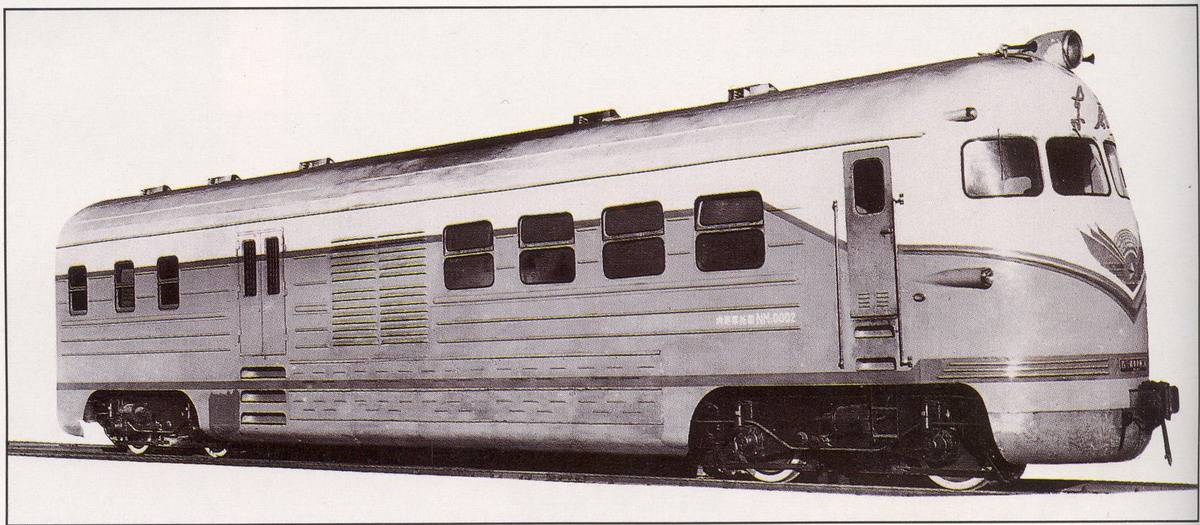
The power car of the Dongfeng

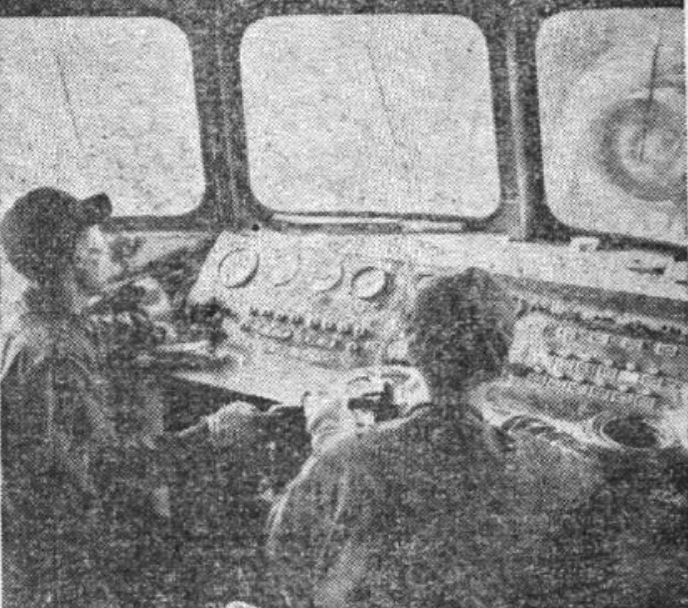
The controls of the Dongfeng

The Dongfeng was designed for short range, high speed travel. Each set had two power cars on either end and trailers in the middle. The two motor cars have the same structure, and were numbered NM_{1}-001 and NM_{1}-002 with the ability for the train to be controlled from either end. They had the same height and width as the passenger cars. Each car was supported by two 2-axle bogies in a B-B layout. They could carry a weight of 65 tons and had a structural speed of 120 km/h (75 mph). From front to rear, the motor car had the driver's cabin, the motor room, the cooling equipment, store rooms and the buffet area. Motor car NM_{1}-001 also had a 10 kW auxiliary petrol engine acting as a generator, providing power to the entire train. The bogie is of a fully welded design, supporting the car through four springs. The bogie was innovative for having vertical hydraulic shock absorber. (Note: The Dongfeng was the first rail vehicle to use hydraulic dampers. Development on them started with Sifang in 1958, and was successfully used on the Dongfeng in the same year.)

==== Motor equipment ====
Each motor car has two Shanxi diesel motor factory built DV12A diesel engines. (Note: The DV12A diesel engine is a motor vehicle variant of the V-2-300, a very similar engine to the V-2-34 that powered the T-34. It was developed in the 1950s after Shanxi diesel engine factory was able to obtain Soviet technologies.) These engines are a V12, direct injection, four-stroke engine with a cylinder of 150 mm (5.9 in) in diameter, piston stroke of 180 mm (7.1 in) (left) and 186.7 mm (7.35 in) (right), with an angle of 60° between them. They have a rated speed of 1500 r.p.m., a rated power output of 220 kW (300 hp) and a weight of 850 kg (1,874 lb). As such, each motor car has an output of 440 kW (600 hp) and the whole set has an output of 880 kW (1200 hp). Cooling fans are driven directly by the motor, after it passes through a gearbox, friction clutch and a universal joint.

=== Double deck trailer ===
==== Carriage structure ====
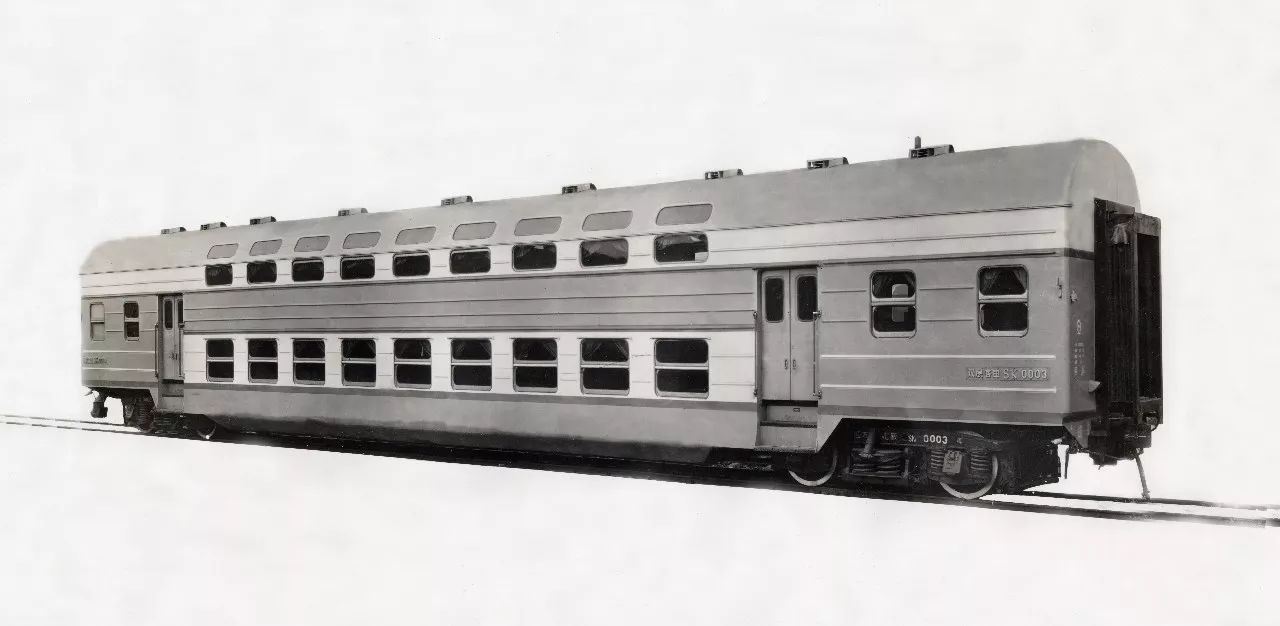
The double deck passenger car, while still fitted with hopper windows and the slanted windows.

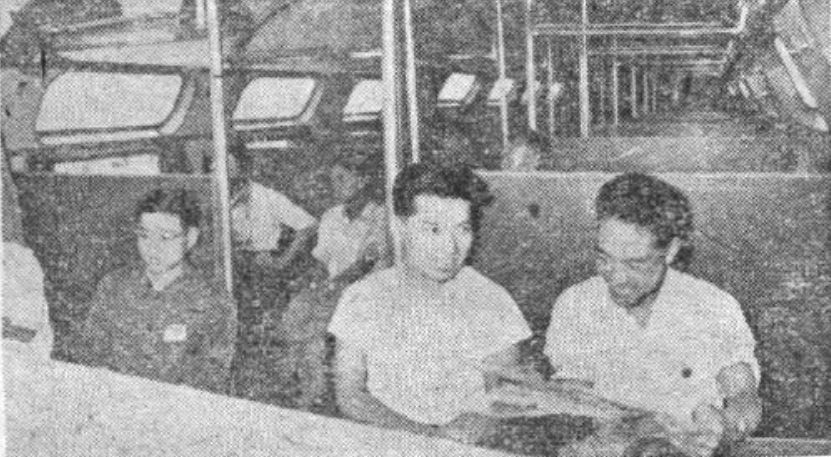
Upper deck. Poles supporting the floor are visible

The four trailers of the Dongfeng DMU were all double deck passenger cars, with the design name of 双_{2}, numbered SK 0001–0004. The carriage is of a welded structure, with overall dimensions similar to the Type 22 carriage, but it is 385 mm (15.2 in) higher than the carriage, and has a lower ground clearance by 600 mm (23.6 in), at 270 mm (10.6 in). The cars weighed 47.5 t (104,720 lb) and had a structural speed of 120 km/h (75 mph). A feature of these passenger cars was that both the upper and lower decks had 16 support poles, carrying the weight of the upper deck but also adding strength to the car body. However, this design reduced space in the carriage, and made it difficult for passengers with luggage to move around easily. When the car passed a renovation in 1969 with Hangzhou sector, all of the support poles were removed, while the staircase structure was strengthened, while the lower deck was fitted with an arch roof to support the weight of the upper deck. All later designs in China uses an arch structure to support the upper deck instead.

==== Layout ====
The passenger car was separated into the upper and lower decks, and the vestibule at either end of the carriage. As the set was designed with short distance commuting in mind, the carriages were all fitted with 'hard' seats, optimising the carriage for capacity instead of comfort. This meant the aisle was only 1,500 mm (4 ft 11 in) wide with a 3 by 3 seating layout. The lower deck had a rated occupancy of 80 people, the upper deck 104 and vestibules 14 for a total of 198 people per carriage. The vestibules are fitted with toilets, boilers and conductor's seat. The doors of the carriages are located at where the structure of the upper and lower decks meets the unified vestibule structure.

The upper deck used downwards folding windows, while the lower deck used upwards folding windows. While the upper deck originally had slanted windows to allow sunlight in, thermal radiation caused the cabin to heat up uncomfortably, such that in 1966 the windows were removed and welded. The upper deck was originally fitted with 18 roof mounted ventilators, while the lower deck was ventilated by holes on the lower part of the carriage, which then passed air into the carriage. Heating was carried out by boiler heated water circulated in the car. These cars were fitted with the Sifang factory type 202C bogie, with an axle width of 2,400 mm (7 ft 10 in) fitted with hydraulic shock absorbers.
