= The East Is Red =

The East Is Red may refer to:

- "The East Is Red" (song), the de facto anthem of the People's Republic of China during the Cultural Revolution in the 1960s
- The East Is Red (1965 film), a "song and dance epic" directed by Ping Wang
- The East Is Red (1993 film), a 1993 Wuxia film
- The East is Red: The Sino Soviet War, a 1974 board wargame

== See also ==
- Dong Fang Hong (disambiguation) ("The East Is Red")
