= Sri Lanka Railways S14 =

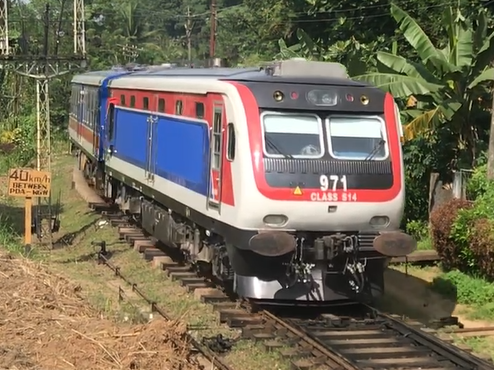
- S14 Powerset No. 971
- Stock type: diesel-electric trainset with power cars
- Manufacturer: CRRC Qingdao Sifang
- Assembly: Qingdao, China
- Constructed: 2019 - 2020 (S14); 2019 - 2020 (S14A)
- Number built: 9 train sets (S14); 4 power cars (S14A)
- Number in service: 22 Power Cars
- Predecessor: Sri Lanka Railways S12
- Formation: 2 Power Cars + 7 Intermediate Coaches
- Fleet numbers: 971–988 (S14); 989–992 (S14A)
- Capacity: 400
- Operator: Sri Lanka Railways

Specifications
- Maximum speed: 120 kilometres per hour (75 mph)
- Weight: 74,000 kilograms (163,000 lb) (Power Car)
- Prime mover: MTU 12V 4000 R41
- Engine type: Diesel
- Tractive effort: 1,950 hp (1,450 kW)
- UIC classification: Bo-Bo
- Track gauge: 1,676 mm (5 ft 6 in)

Sri Lanka Railways S14 is a class of diesel-electric trainsets with locomotive-like power cars, built for Sri Lanka Railways by CRRC Qingdao Sifang, China and financed by a Chinese sovereign loan. Nine of these train sets were imported to Sri Lanka from 2019 to 2020. They possess air-conditioned first class along with second class and third class accommodations. The Class S14s were ordered to mainly operate on the Main Line from Colombo to Badulla and Kandy.

In addition, four power cars designated as the S14A Class were also ordered for the Aruwakkalu Waste Processing Facility under the Metro Colombo Solid Waste Management Project in Puttalam. Delivery of these units began in 2020.

== Livery ==
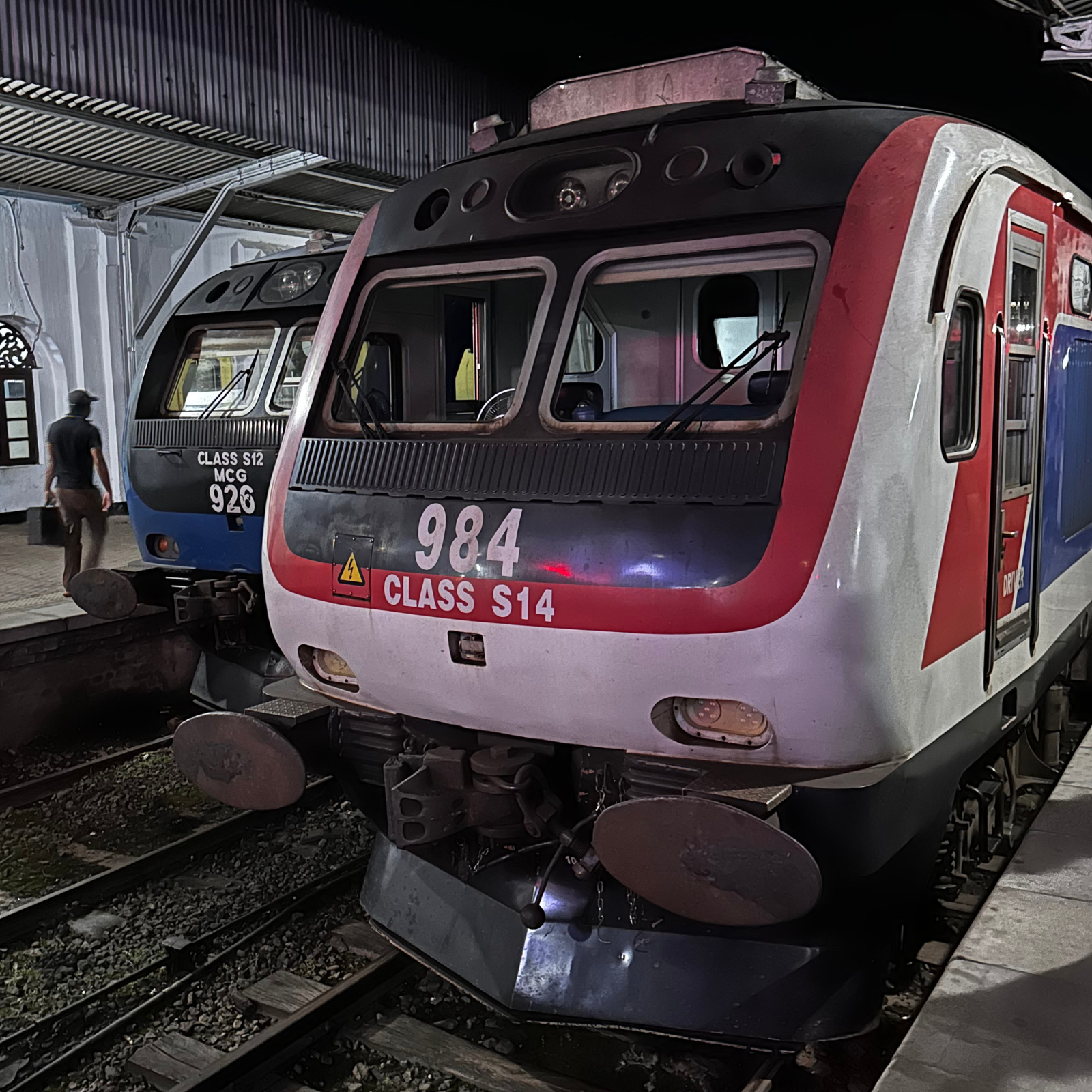
S14 Powerset No. 984 at Kandy railway station

The Class S14 diesel trains all sport a pink, blue and white livery, while the S14A power cars are adorned with a distinctive green and white livery.

== Operations ==
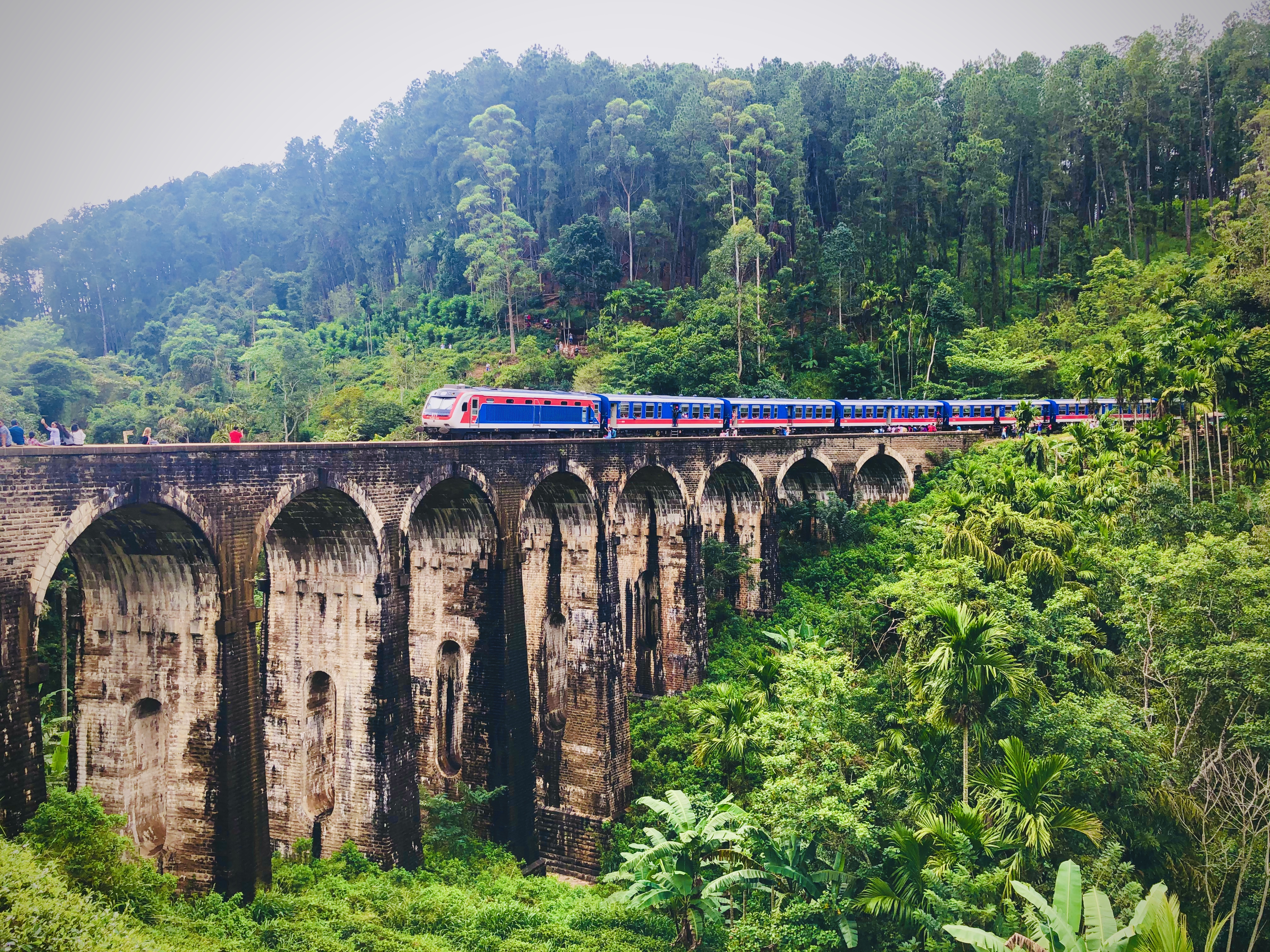
A S14 diesel train passing over the Nine Arch Bridge in Ella whilst running the Denuwara Menike

The maiden run of the Class S14 was undertaken on the 3 September 2019 from Ratmalana to Aluthgama.

The following named services are currently operated by the Class S14:

Service Name	Line	Starting Station	Terminus Station
Udarata Menike	Main Line	Colombo Fort	Badulla
Podi Menike	Main Line	Colombo Fort	Badulla
Denuwara Menike	Main Line	Colombo Fort	Badulla
Ella Odyssey	Main Line	Colombo Fort	Badulla
