= Sri Lanka Railways S12 =

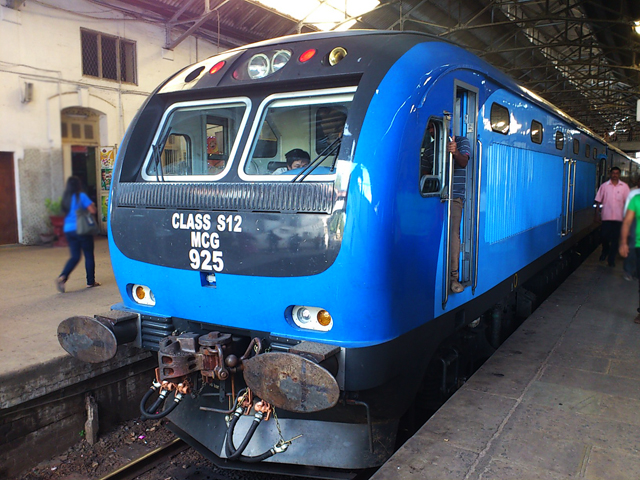
- Class S12 No. 925
- Stock type: diesel electric trainset with power cars
- Manufacturer: CSR
- Built at: Sifang, China
- Replaced: Class M5, Class M6
- Constructed: 2012
- Number built: 23 locomotives
- Number in service: 23 locomotives
- Successor: Sri Lanka Railways S14
- Formation: MCG + 3xTC + 3xSC + 1xFC + 1xRC + MCG (Main Line Set) || MCG + 5xTC + DDCG (KV Set)
- Fleet numbers: 917-939
- Capacity: 44 (AFC) + 66*3 (TC) + 52 (TCBU) + 44*3 (SC) = 426
- Operator: Sri Lanka Railways

Specifications
- Car body construction: Stainless steel
- Car length: 50 ft (15.24 m)
- Maximum speed: 100 km/h (62 mph) (De-rated 80 km/h or 50 mph)
- Prime mover: MTU 12V4000R41 Two engines per unit in Main Line Set
- Engine type: V12
- Power output: 1,950 hp (1,450 kW)
- Transmission: Diesel-electric
- Braking systems: Air (Knorr-Bremse), Dynamic
- Coupling system: Automatic (dual)
- Track gauge: 5 ft 6 in (1,676 mm)

Sri Lanka Railways S12 is a class of diesel-electric trainset with locomotive-like power cars built for Sri Lanka Railways by China's CSR Corporation. The first batch arrived in Sri Lanka in August 2012. They were built to replace locomotive-hauled passenger trains. Seven of the S12 DMUs were ordered to strengthen long-distance travel on the Main line from Colombo to Badulla. Four of S12s were built to serve the Kelani Valley Line. The remaining two sets were designed as a luxury train.

== History ==
The S12 diesel trainsets were meant to improve services on the Main Line and the Kelani Valley Line. The steep hills and tight curves on the mountainous section of the Main Line is difficult to operate. Prior to the S12, only a few classes of locomotives were capable of operating this line. As these trains started to replace locomotive-operated trains on other lines, the up-country Main Line could not be operated by diesel train. The S12 is the first diesel train to handle these conditions.

The locomotives were purchased under a US$101 million credit line agreement with China. The loan was to be settled within 15 years.

In September 2012, the first units had trial runs. The first Main Line train operated by the S12 began on 23 October 2012.

Most of the named services operated by the S12 diesel trains were later taken over by the newer S14 diesel trains.

== Current fleet details ==
Class	Configuration	Line	Operator	No. locos in fleet	No. of sets in service	Year built	Cars per Set	Unit numbers.
S12	Long Distance	Main Line	Sri Lanka Railways	15	7	2012 - 2013	8	917-939
S12	Commuter	KV Line	Sri Lanka Railways	4	4	2012 - 2013	7	917-939
S12	Luxury		Sri Lanka Railways	4	2	2012 - 2013	8	917-939

== Operations ==
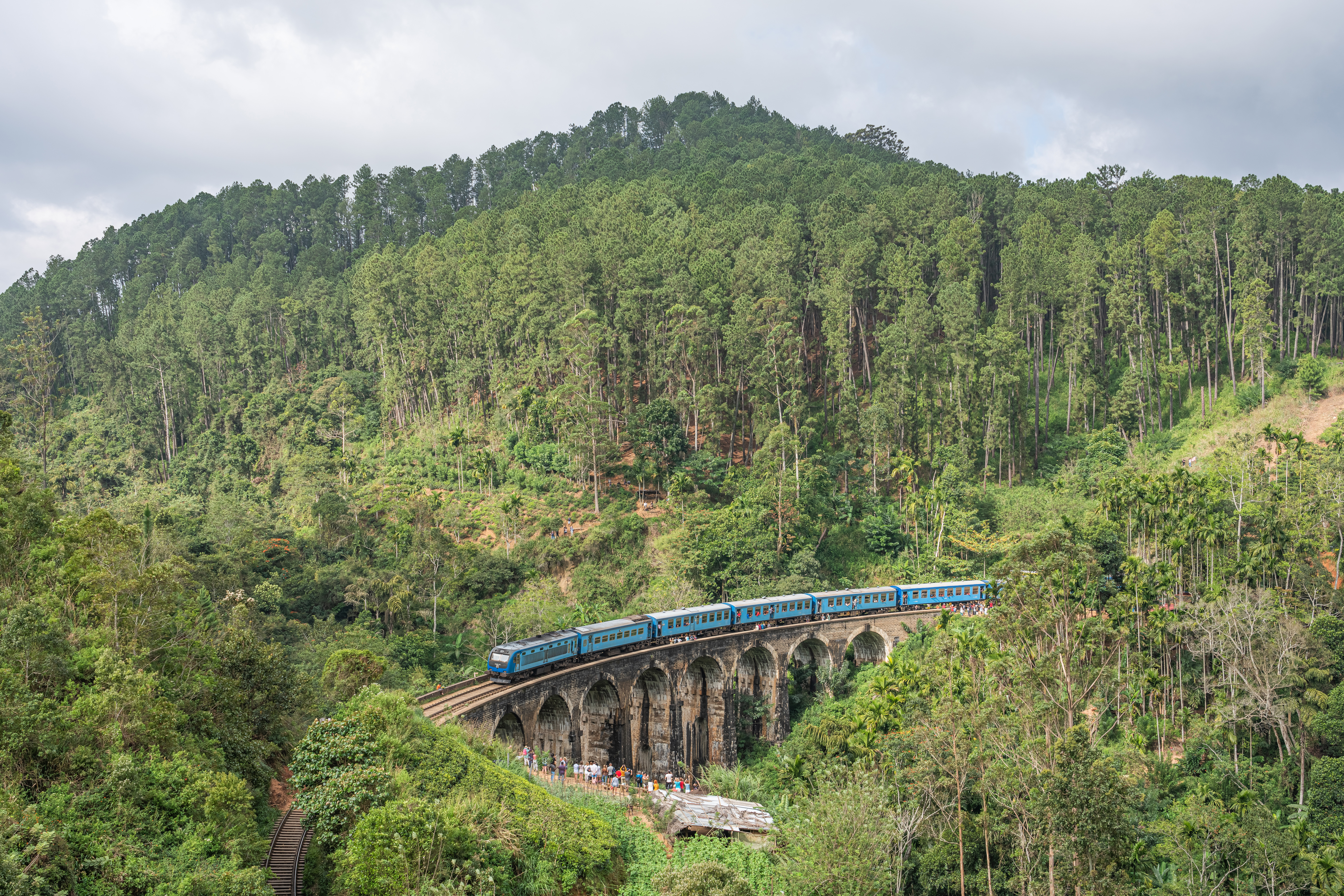
A S12 diesel trainset passing over the Nine Arch Bridge in Ella

Class S12 train sets are used in three different configurations as mentioned above, for Long distance trains, long distance luxury trains and short distance commuter trains. They are operated mainly on the Main Line (Long distance config) and Kelani Valley Line (Commuter config).

== Gallery ==
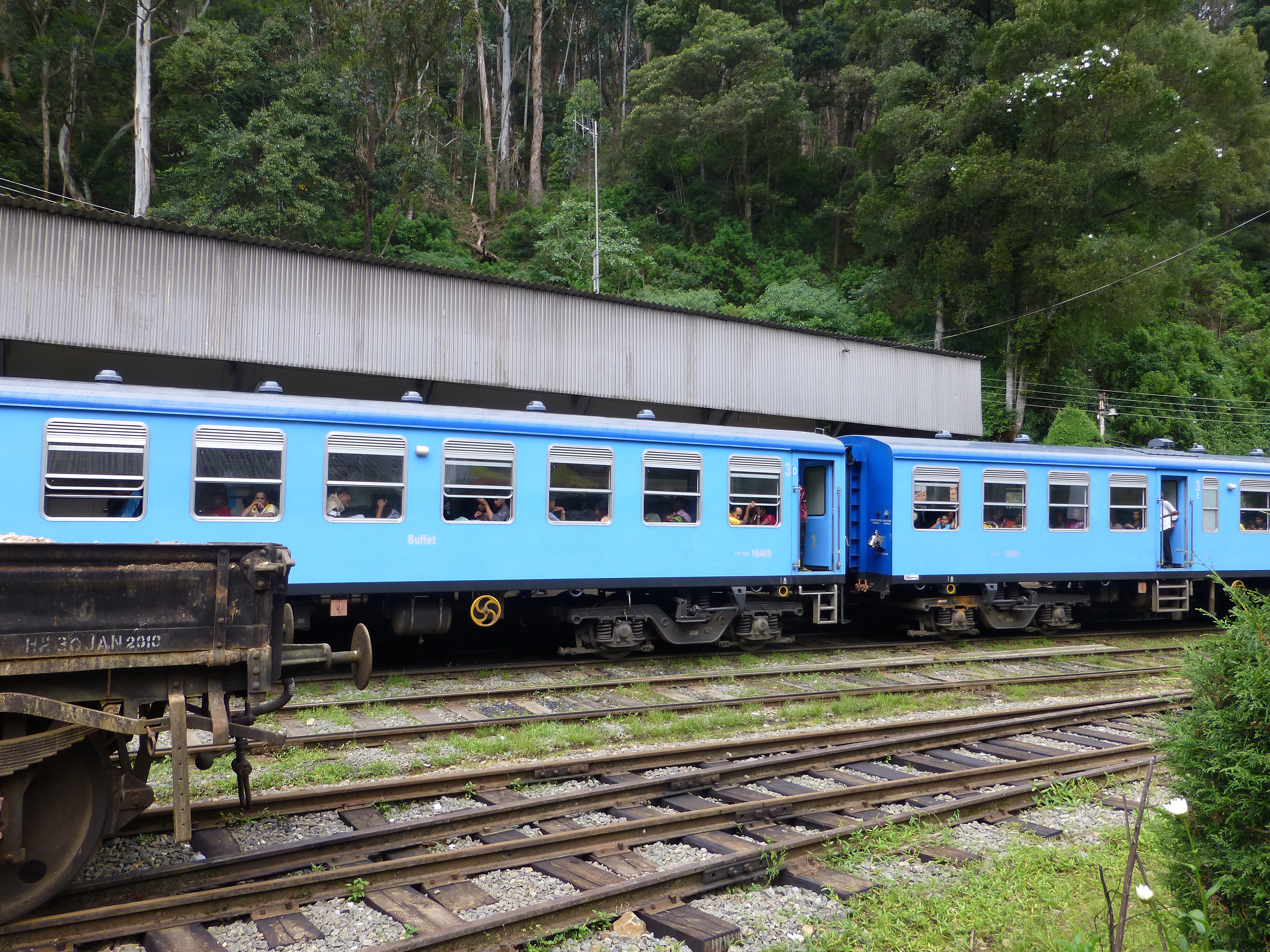
Class S12 at Ohiya Railway Station

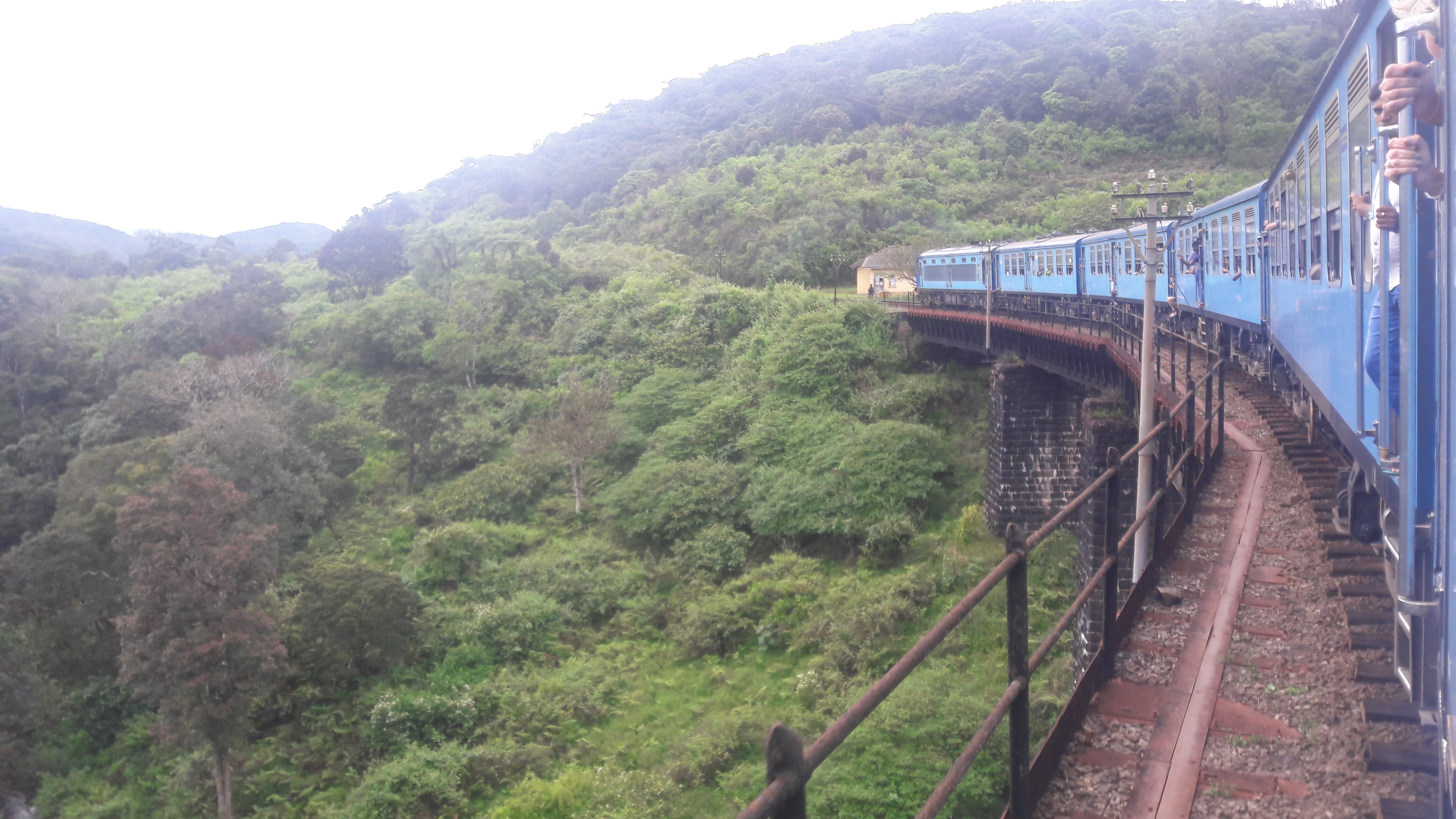
Class S12 in Ambewela

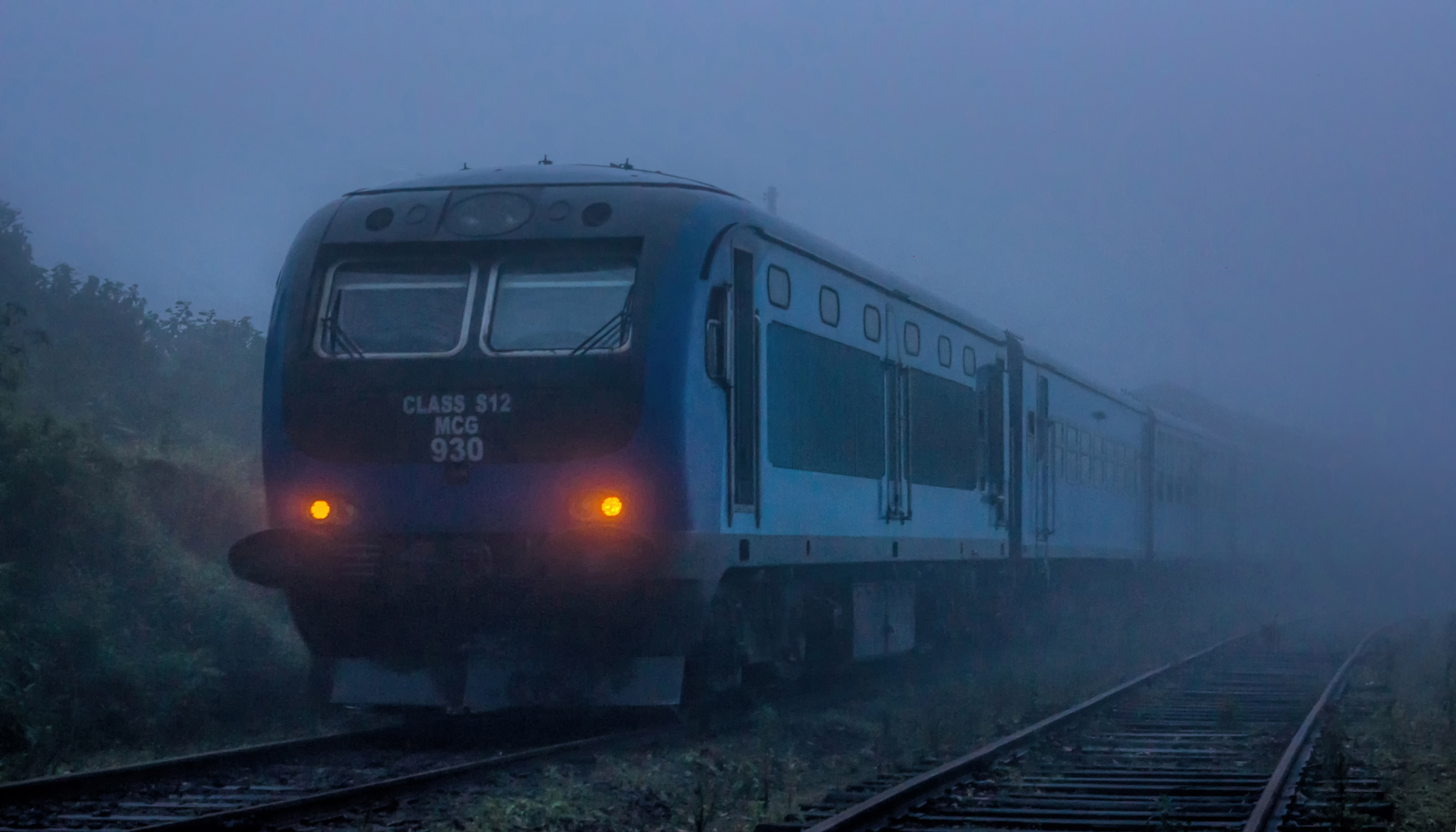
Class S12 at Idalgashinna Railway Station
