= China Railway DFH shunting locomotives =

Class of Chinese diesel-hydraulic locomotives

DFH2, DFH5, DFH6, DFH7, DFH21 东方红2、东方红5、东方红6、东方红7、东方红21
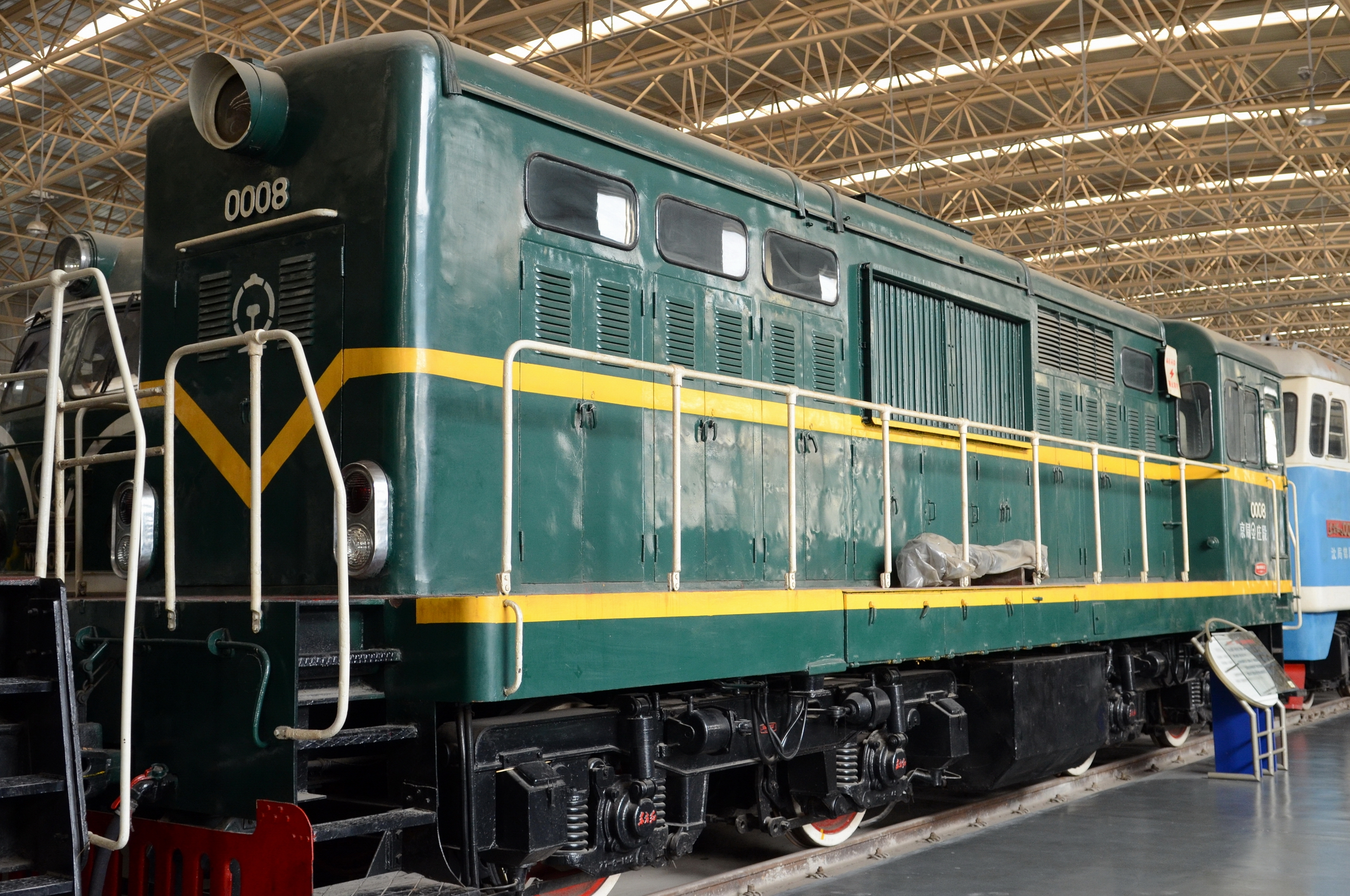
- DFH2-0008
Type and origin
- Power type: Diesel-hydraulic
- Builder: DFH2, DFH5, DFH6, DFH7 Ziyang locomotive works DFH2, DFH5, DFH21 Sifang locomotive works
- Build date: DFH2 1973; DFH5 1976-1988; DFH6 1981; DFH7 1988; DFH21 1977 (prototype), 1982
- Total produced: DFH2 ? DFH5 >500; DFH6 1 DFH7 4 DFH21 >29
Specifications
- Configuration
  - UIC: B'B'
- Gauge: 1,435 mm (4 ft 8 1/2 in); DFH21 1,000 mm (3 ft 3 3/8 in)
- Minimum curve: (?)
- Length: DFH2 12.400 m (40 ft 8.2 in); DFH5 13.700 m (44 ft 11.4 in); DFH6 ? DFH7 ? DFH21 12.000 m (39 ft 4.4 in)
- Transmission: Hydraulic
Performance figures
- Maximum speed: DFH2 62 km/h (39 mph); DFH5 40 km/h (25 mph); DFH6 ? DFH7 ? DFH21 50 km/h (31 mph)
- Power output: DFH2 650 kW (870 hp); DFH5 790 kW (1,060 hp); DFH6 1,740 kW (2,330 hp); DFH7 790 kW (1,060 hp); DFH21 640 kW (860 hp)
Career
- Operators: China Railway DFH2, DFH5, DFH6, DFH7, DFH21; Vietnam Railways D10H

The Dongfang Hong (Chinese: 东方红) was a type of single-cab diesel-hydraulic locomotive used on China Railways. The first DFH began trial production in 1959 at the Sifang Locomotive and Rolling Stock Works (CRRC Sifang), before entering mass production in 1966. The DFH series of diesel locomotives, includes the DFH2, DFH3, DFH4, DFH5, DFH7 and DFH21. The DFH 2,5,6,7 and 21 were shunting locomotives built from the 1970s to 1990s.

The use of diesel-hydraulic shunters has fallen out of favour on the Chinese rail network, with diesel-electric locomotives being used. However, diesel-hydraulic machines continued to be produced for industrial railways – mainly the China Railways GK classes.

The DFH21 class is a meter gauge version of the DFH2, and was used on the Yunnan–Vietnam Railway for both passenger and freight services; the same machines are used on the Vietnam Railways where they are known as the D10H.

== China Railways standard gauge ==
=== DFH2 ===
The DFH2 was originally designed by Sifang locomotive works in 1966 as a passenger locomotive of rated power 1,470 kW (1,970 hp). The design did not enter mass production. In 1973, the design was changed at Ziyang locomotive works to a 650 kW (870 hp) power locomotive with a top speed of 62 km/h (39 mph). (Note: 新闻资料：东方红型内燃机车, Dongfang Hong (The east is red) types 2 and 3 museum images, news.workercn.cn)

The mass was 60 t (59.1 long tons; 66.1 short tons) and the starting tractive effort was 192 kN (43,000 lb_{f}). The locomotive used a 12V180ZL engine and SF2010 transmission.

In 1976, CRRC Sifang produced several DFH and DFH2 locomotives for use on the Chinese funded Tanzania-Zambia Railway (TAZARA Railway), becoming the first locomotive to be exported from China.

=== DFH5 ===
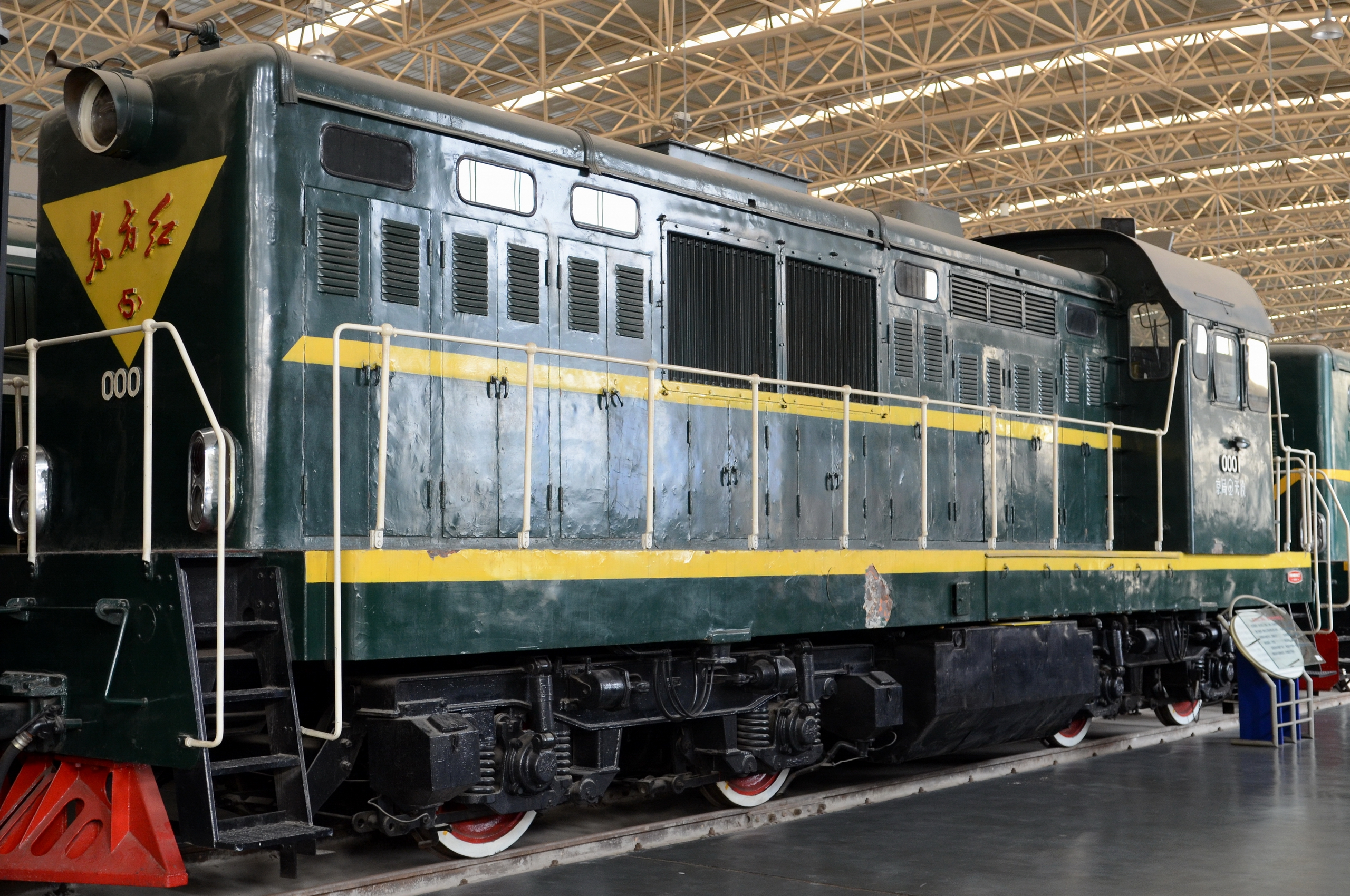
DFH5-0001

To compensate to the growing needs of growing railway traffic for industrial and mining operations, the Ziyang Diesel Locomotive Factory redesigned the DFH2, addressing technical issues in the manufacturing process and operations, to create the DFH5. The locomotive's pushing capacity was increased to 3300 tons. Between 1975 and 1993, 450 units were manufactured.

Early models of the DFH2 and DFH5 locomotives suffered from high oil temperatures in warm environments. To address this issue, in August 1976, the Ziyang Diesel Locomotive Factory improved the lubrication oil pipeline on the DFH5 locomotive No. 0001 to reduce oil temperatures, a change that was further implemented on later units of the DFH5. In 1986, the Ziyang Diesel Locomotive Factory then made improvements to the torque converter in the hydraulic transmission box, adding a new turning mechanism and module axle gears. Improvements were also made to the axle gearbox and bogie frame. To meet the high-temperature and corrosion-resistant requirements of metallurgical and chemical systems, the locomotive uses fire-resistant, heat-insulating, and corrosion-resistant materials, enabling it to operate in external temperatures of 50°C. These improvements led to the widespread use of the DFH5 diesel locomotive in local railways and industrial and mining enterprises.

The DFH5 engine was a 12V180ZJ and transmission ZJ2011, producing 278 kN (62,000 lb_{f}) of tractive effort with a mass of 86 t (84.6 long tons; 94.8 short tons) and with a top speed of 40 km/h (25 mph). A higher speed was available with a limit of 80 km/h (50 mph) and tractive effort reduced to approximately half. (Note: 新闻资料：东方红型内燃机车, Dongfang Hong (The east is red) type 5, museum images and technical details, news.workercn.cn)

Variants, the DFH5B and DFH5C, were introduced in 1985, with modifications to improve reliability and performance – in both where the rated power was increased to 920 kW (1,230 hp), and the mass by 4 t (3.9 long tons; 4.4 short tons). DFH5C was produced for operations in metalworks.

=== DFH6 ===
In 1981, CRRC Ziyang designed and trial-produced the 2,000 horsepower hydraulic transmission shunting locomotive, the DFH 6. One example was produced for shunting in the Chinese port of Huangpu District, Shanghai.

=== DFH7 ===
Four units were produced for shunting in mines and industrial environments.

== Metre gauge ==
=== DFH21 ===
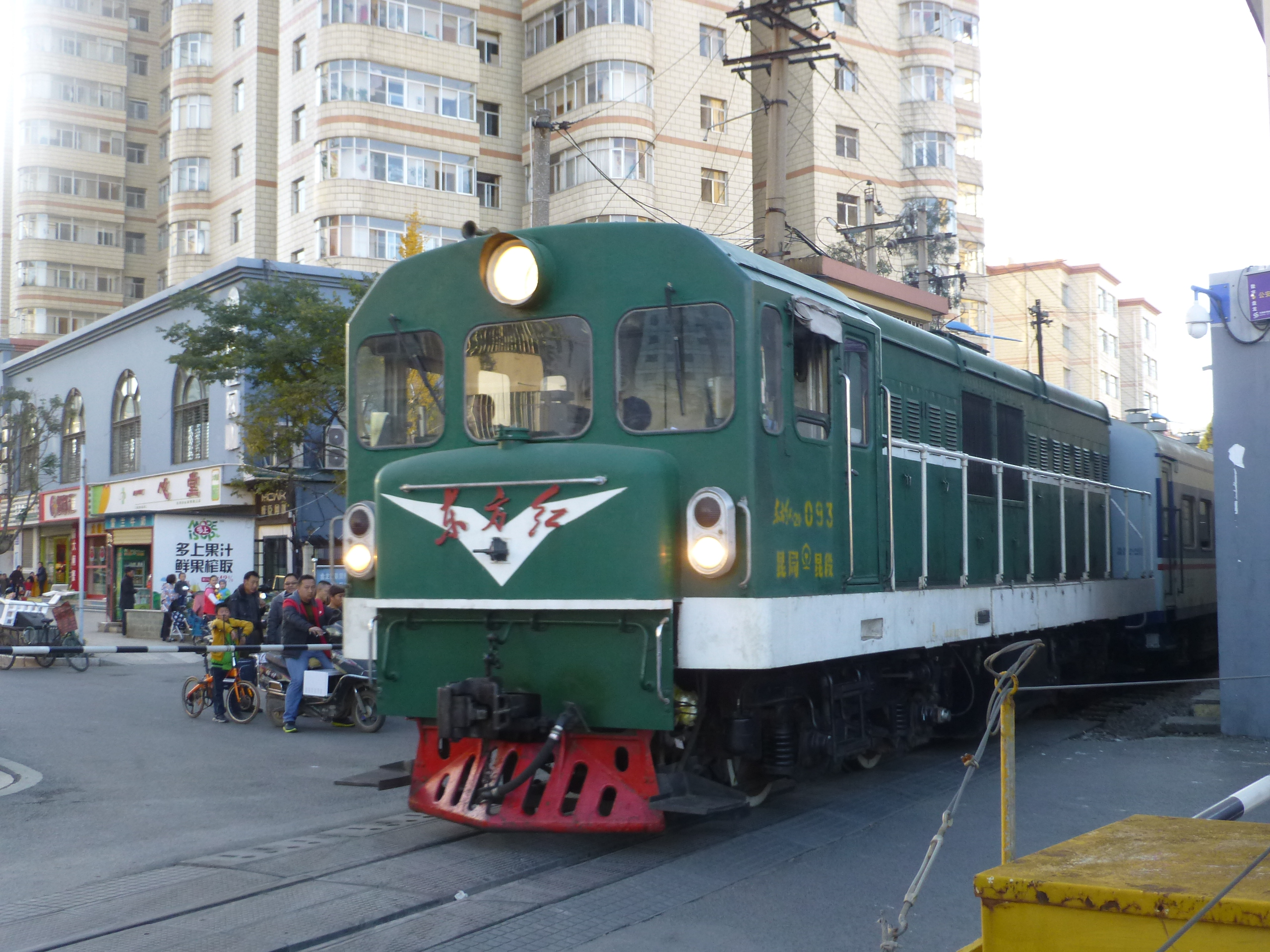
A DF21 pulling a narrow-gauge commuter train in Kunming (2016)

CRRC Sifang designed and developed the DFH 21 diesel shunting locomotive in 1977 for use on Yunnan’s metre-gauge railway, upgrading the line from steam to modern diesel powered engines. The DFH 21 locomotive was similar in design to the DFH2 type but was built to meter gauge and used as universal locomotives. The locomotives were used on the Kunming metre gauge railway, including passenger services. (Note: DFH21 Images via www.flickr.com)

As of 2012, Kunming rail fans report that DFH21 locomotives are still used to haul a few passenger trains a day along the metre gauge tracks from Kunming North Railway Station to several nearby stations. As of 2014, these trains were still in operation.

30 of the locomotives are also used by Vietnam Railways, where they are known as the D10H. In 2005, Vietnam railways had 20 units operational. In 2009, ten of the engines had Caterpillar Inc. 3512B engines fitted as replacements.

== Preserved locomotives ==
DFH2 0008 and DFH5 0001 are both preserved at the Beijing China Railway Museum.

== See also ==
- China Railways DFH mainline locomotives, Contemporary Chinese diesel-hydraulic locomotives used primarily for passenger and freight trains
