= China Railways DFH mainline locomotives =

Class of Chinese diesel-hydraulic locomotives

Dongfanghong (东方红)
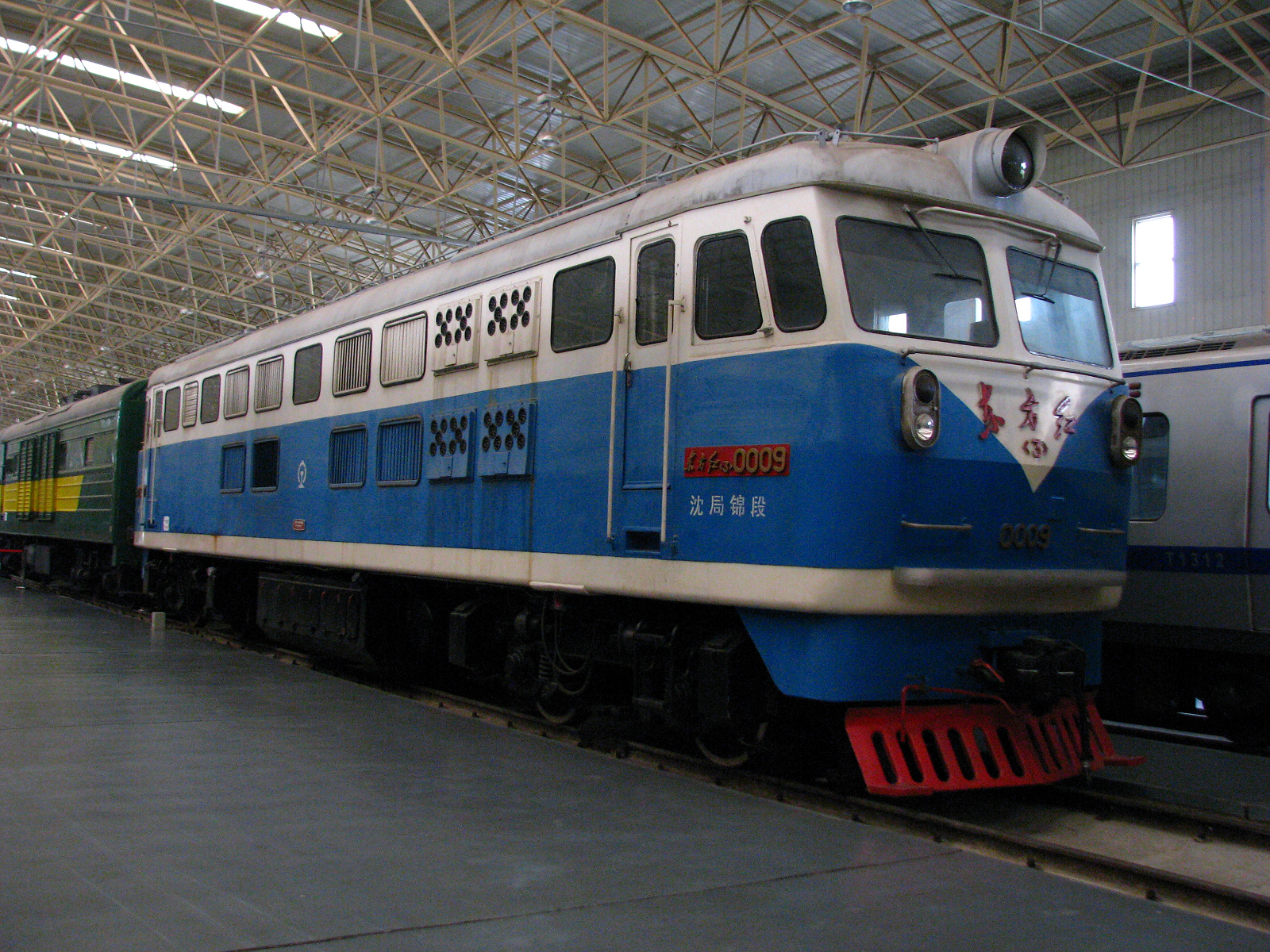
- DFH3-0009 at Beijing Railway Museum (2010)
Type and origin
- Power type: Diesel-hydraulic
- Builder: DFH1: Sifang; DFH3: Sifang; DFH4 Sifang, Ziyang, Qishuyan; China
- Build date: DFH1 1959‡ 1964-1972 (series); DFH3 1976-87; DFH4 1969-81
- Total produced: DFH1 109; DFH3 268; DFH4 6
Specifications
- Configuration
  - UIC: DFH1, DFH3 B’B’ DFH4 6 axle
- Gauge: 1,435 mm (4 ft 8 1/2 in)
- Wheel diameter: DF1, DF3 1,050 mm (41.34 in); DF4 ?
- Minimum curve: DF1, DF3 145 m (476 ft); DF4 ?
- Length: DFH1 16.550 m (54 ft 3.6 in); DFH3 17.970 m (58 ft 11.5 in)
- Width: DFH1 3.106 m (10 ft 2.28 in); DFH3 3.279 m (10 ft 9.09 in)
- Height: DFH1 4.516 m (14 ft 9.80 in); DFH3 4.450 m (14 ft 7.20 in)
- Loco weight: DFH1 84 t (83 long tons; 93 short tons); DFH3 92t
- Prime mover: DFH1 2 of 12V175Z, 12V180Z or 12V175ZL; DFH3 12V180JZ; DFH4 2 of 12V200ZL later 12V200ZJ
- Transmission: DFH1 hydraulic 12175Z (2 of)
Performance figures
- Maximum speed: DFH1 140 km/h (87 mph)*, 120 km/h (75 mph)† DFH3 120 km/h (75 mph)
- Power output: DFH1 1,060 kW (1,420 hp)*, 1,220 kW (1,640 hp)† DFH3 2*730 kW (980 hp), 2*820 kW (1,100 hp)¤ DFH4 3,308 kW (4,436 hp)¶
- Tractive effort: DFH1250 kN (56,000 lb_{f}) / 270 kN (61,000 lb_{f}) (maximum); DFH3 271 kN (61,000 lb_{f}) (maximum)
Career
- Operators: China Railway (North Korea) Korean State Railway
- First 73 units † Final 36 units ‡ NY1 prototype ¤ Two units produced in 1986 of higher power ¶ First units produced were of higher power

The Dongfanghong (Chinese: 东方红) was a type of 4-axle B'B' single-cab diesel-hydraulic locomotive used on China Railway's mainline. The DFH began trial production in 1959 at the Sifang Locomotive and Rolling Stock Works (CRRC Sifang), before entering mass production in 1966. The DFH series of electric-drive diesel locomotives, includes the models numbered DFH2, DFH3, DFH4, DFH5, DFH7 and DFH21. The DFH 2,5,6,7 and 21 were shunting locomotives.

== NY1-Dongfanghong Diesel Locomotive ==
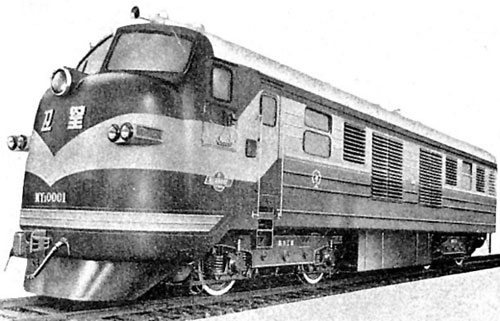
Prototype NY1 Weixing

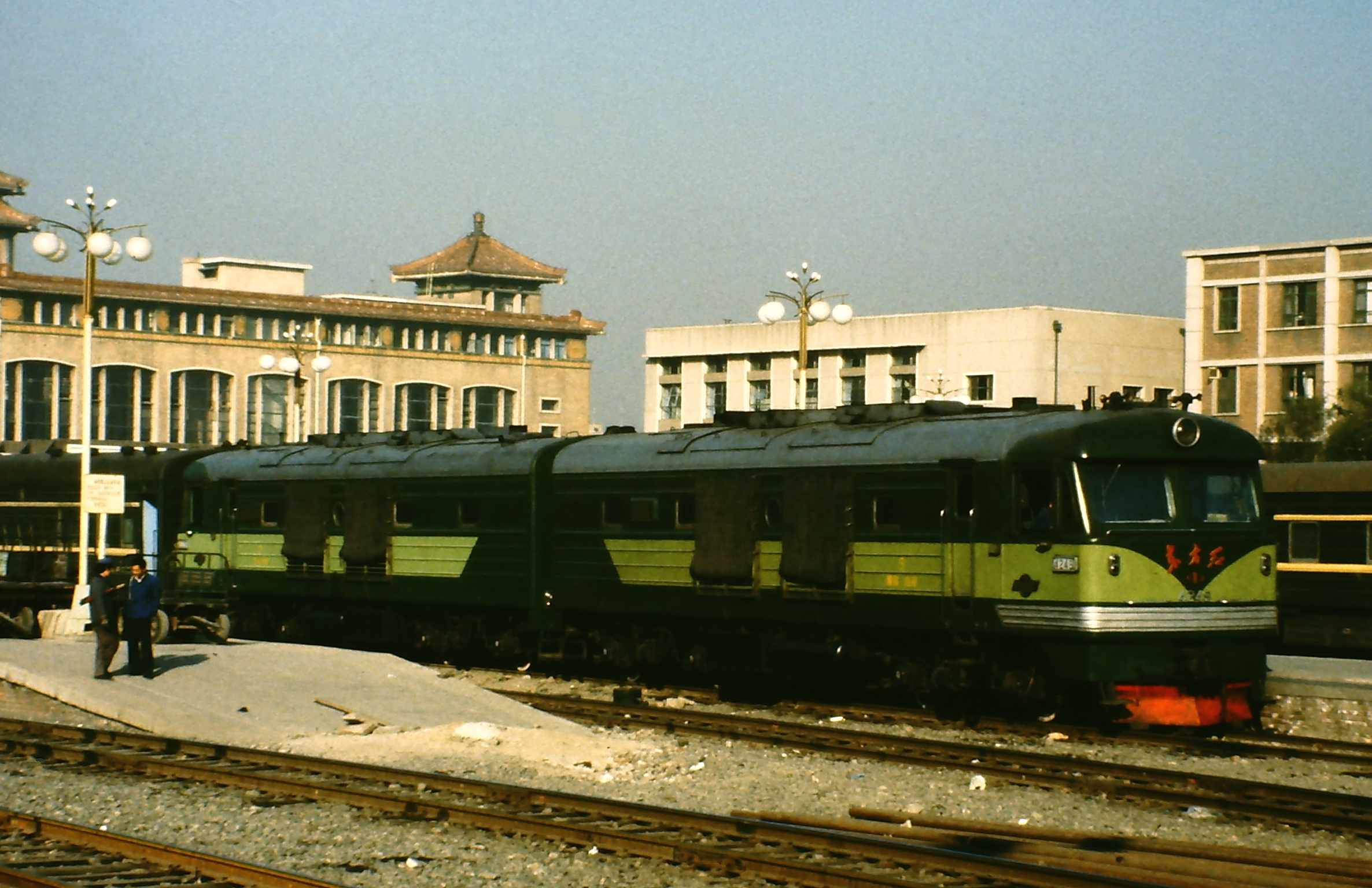
DFH1 at Beijing railway station

The first prototype unit (NY1) (neiran yeli chuandong meaning diesel-hydraulic transmission) was produced in 1959 at Sifang locomotive works, and given the name 'Weixing,' meaning Satellite. The NY1 prototype was launched as a tribute to the 10th anniversary of the founding of the People's Republic of China.

The NY1 locomotive design was similar to German diesel-hydraulic machines such as the DB Class V 200, consisting of two high-speed diesel engines. The pair of engines would have each drive a separate hydraulic torque converter based transmission. This configuration resulted in low mass compared to contemporary diesel-electric locomotives.

The first edition of the DFH was put into mass production in 1966 and was a part of China’s first generation of mainline passenger diesel locomotives. The DFH was continually redeveloped during the late 1960s, leading to the development of the both mainline passenger, freight, and shunting models. The original DFH locomotive could be worked in multiple with a driver’s cab at each end. They operated on the Beijing Shenyang passenger trains.

== Dongfanghong 3 ==
In 1976, CRRC Sifang put the newly developed DFH 3 into mass production. The DFH 3 was the first of China Railways second-generation passenger diesel locomotives. Unlike earlier models, the DFH 3 was designed with two driving cabs. The DFH3 shares the same twin engine and twin hydraulic transmission as the DFH.

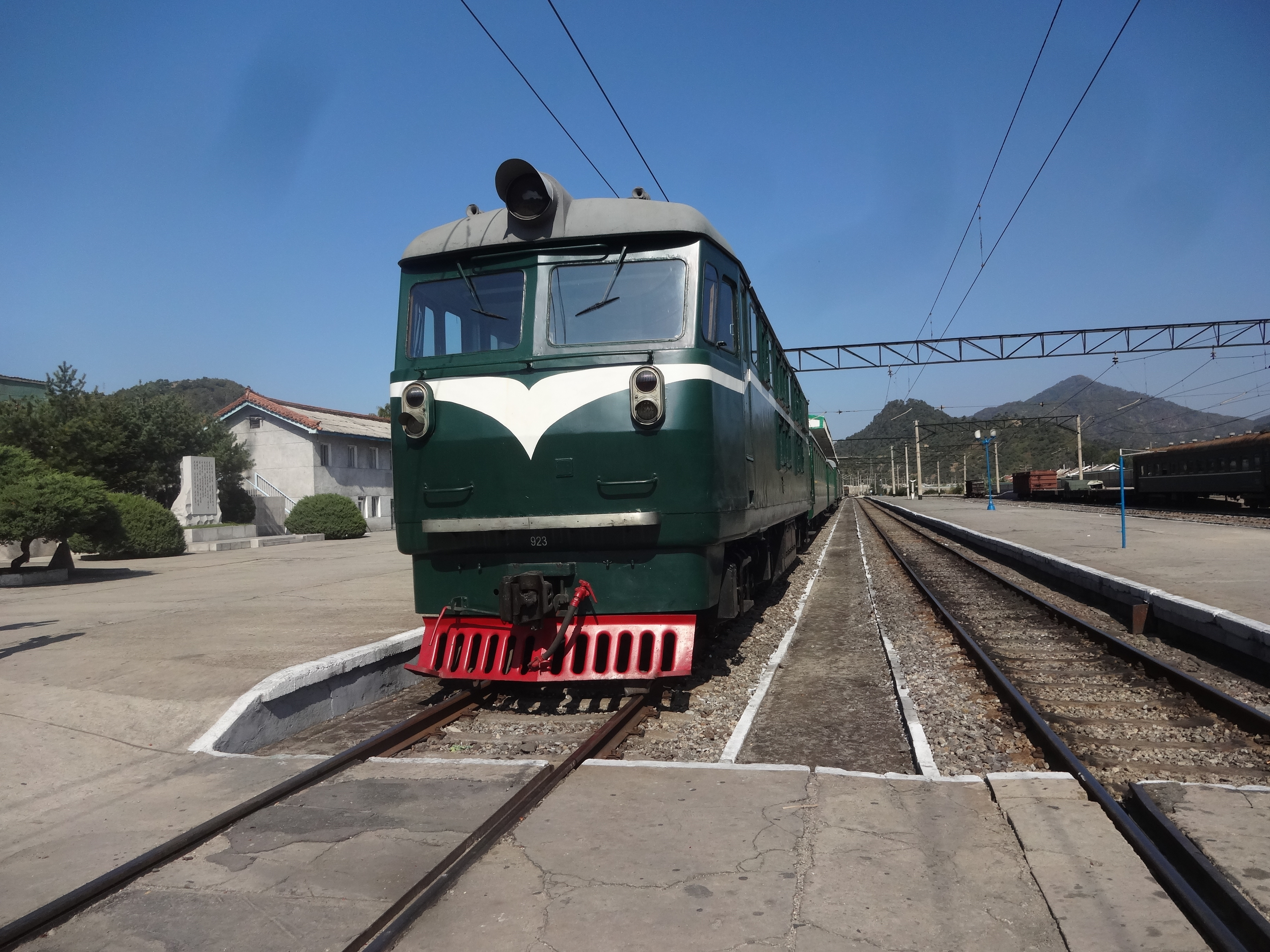
내연923, ex-China Railways DFH3 in service in North Korea.

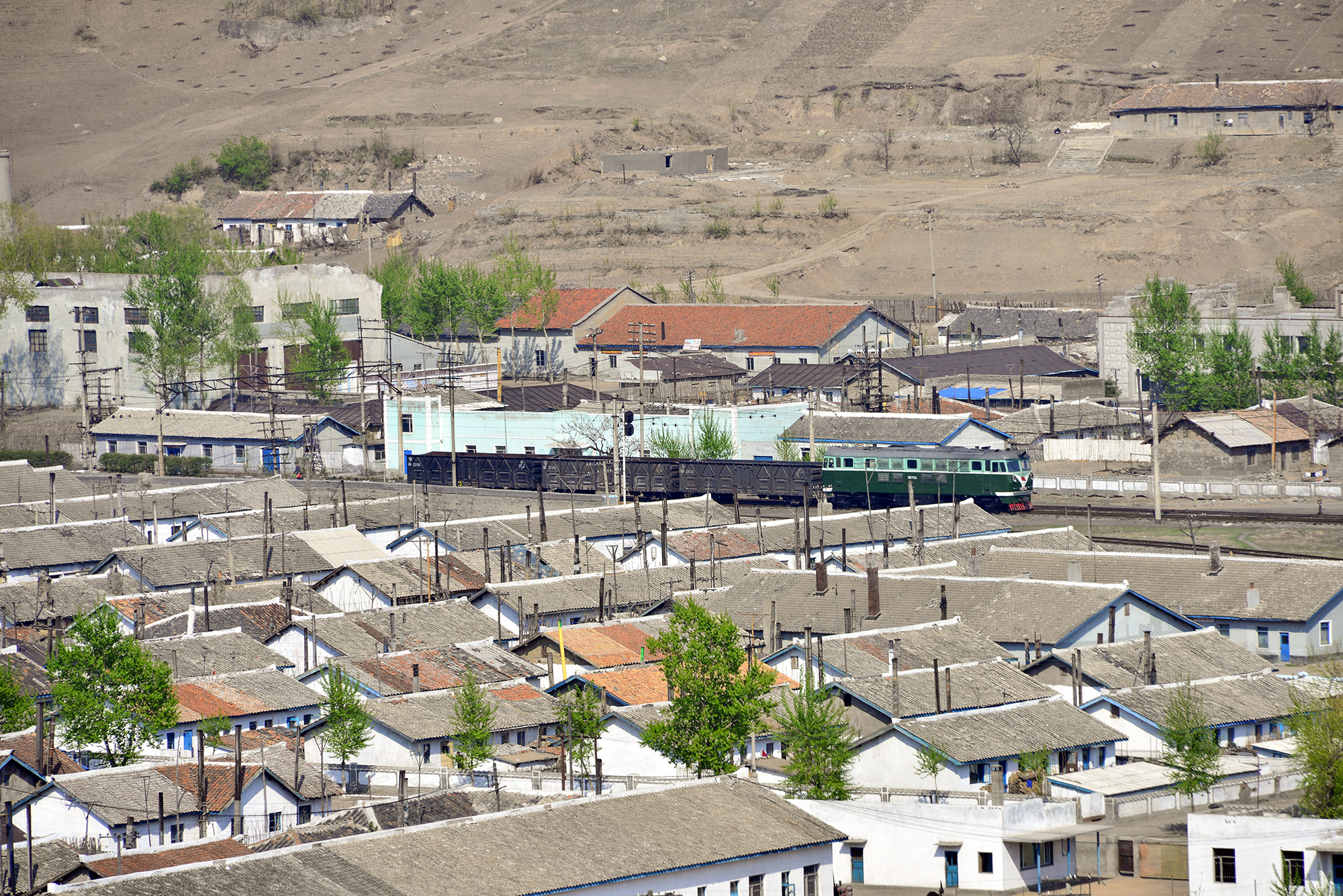
A DFH3 in standard Kukch'ŏl livery at Namyang Station on the Hambuk Line.

The DFH3 class were used on passenger trains in northeast China, by 2010 most had been displaced, and some are believed to being used in industrial service.

=== North Korea ===
Between 2000 and 2002, thirty second-hand DFH3 were imported by the Korean State Railway for operation in North Korea, numbered 내연901 to 내연930, although 내연903 is a Beijing class locomotive. Many are still in their original Chinese livery of blue and white, but some have been repainted into several different liveries, including the standard North Korean light blue over dark green, along with non-standard schemes of white over green, green with a yellow stripe, and green with a white stripe.

== Dongfanghong 4 ==
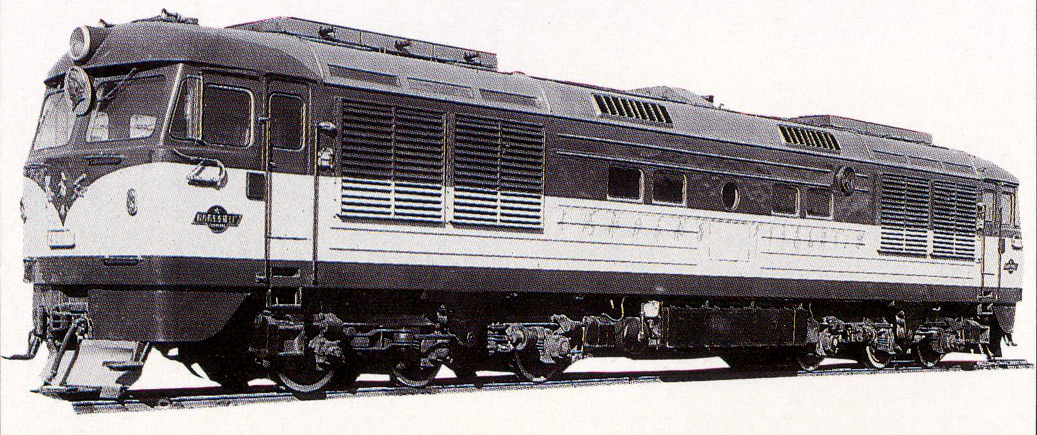
DFH4

The Qishuyan Ziyang Diesel locomotive works manufactured six locomotives of type DFH4 between 1969 and 1981. The first unit was produced in 1969 with an overall 5,000 hp (3,700 kW) machine with twin engine and hydraulic transmission. Two 4,500 hp (3,400 kW) machines were produced in 1971 and 1974. Between 1975 and 1981 the CRRC Ziyang plant investigated the manufacture of further locomotives using the 12V200ZJ engine.

== Preserved locomotives ==
One unit, locomotive number DFH1 4290 is an exhibit at the Beijing China Railway Museum, all other units have been destroyed except DFH1 4222 which is believed to be at the locomotive museum in Shenyang. The Beijing museum also stores DFH3 0009.

== See also ==
- China Railways DFH shunting locomotives, Contemporary Chinese diesel-hydraulic locomotives used primarily for shunting
