= E01 expressway (Sri Lanka) =

Road in Sri Lanka

Southern Expressway
- Colombo–Matara Expressway
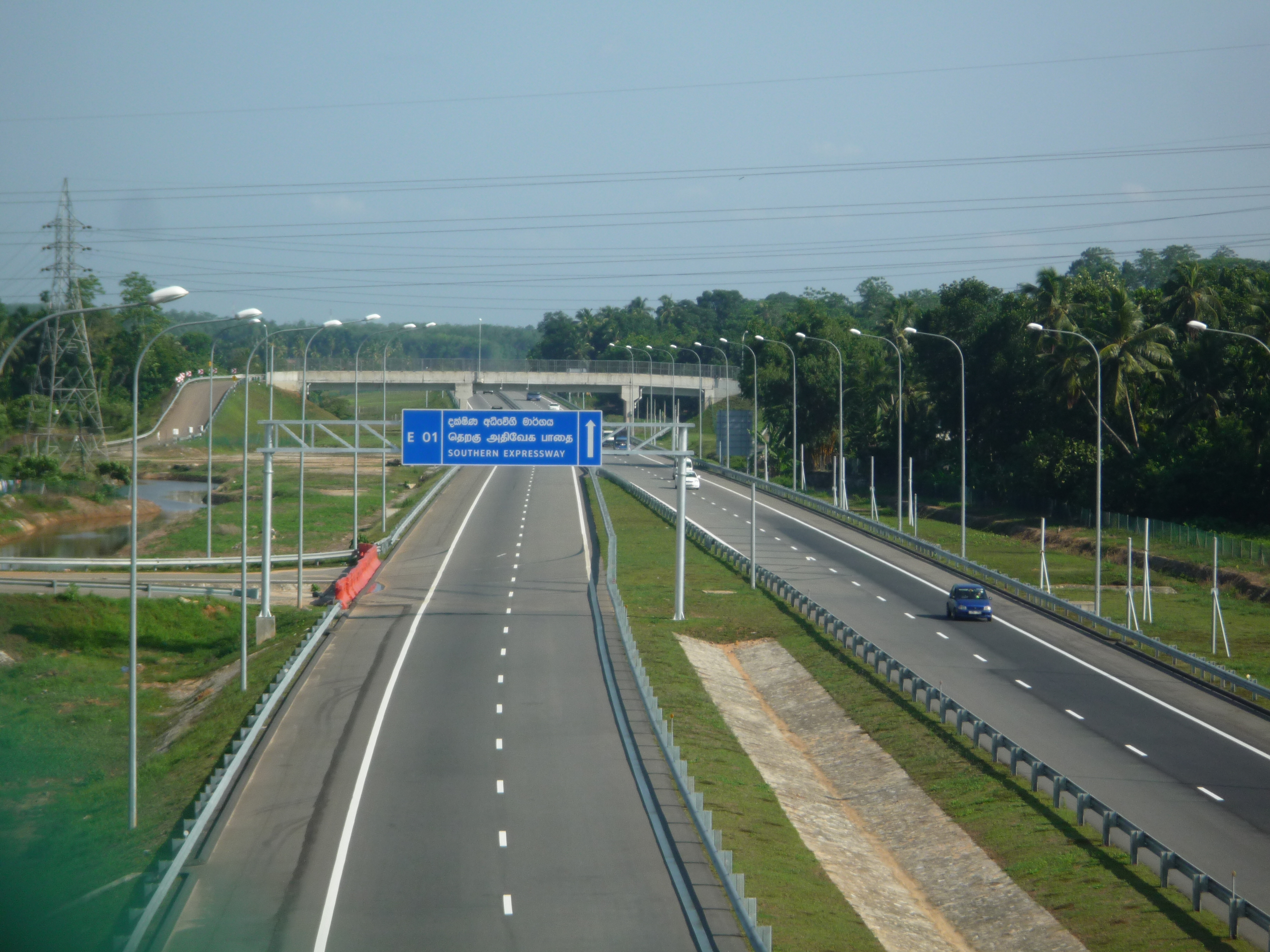

Route information
- Maintained by the Road Development Authority
- Length: 222 km (138 mi)
- Existed: 27 November 2011–present
- History: Kottawa-Galle section opened on 27 November 2011. Galle-Matara section opened on 15 March 2014. Matara-Hambantota Section opened on 23 February 2020.

Major junctions
- North end: Kottawa A4 - Start of E02 Colombo Outer Circular Expressway
- Interchange 2 → B84 in Kahathuduwa - Start of E06 Ruwanpura Expressway; Interchange 3 → A8 in Gelanigama; Interchange 4 → B304 in Dodangoda; Interchange 5 → B157 in Welipanna; Interchange 6 → B14 in Kurundugahahetekma; Interchange 7 → B153 in Baddegama; Interchange 8 → B594 in Pinnaduwa; Interchange 9 → A17 in Imaduwa; Interchange 10 → B465 in Kokmaduwa; Interchange 11 → B275 in Kapuduwa; Interchange 12 → B284 in Aparekka; Interchange 13 → B54 in Beliatta; Interchange 14 → B410 in Bedigama; Interchange 15 → B387 in Kasagala; Interchange 16 → B465 in Agunukolapelessa; Interchange 17 → A18 in Barawakumbuka; Interchange 18 → B562 in Sooriyawewa; Interchange 19 → E06 in Andarawewa; Interchange 20 → B631 in Mattala
- South end: Mattala B631

Location
- Country: Sri Lanka
- Provinces: Western Province, Sri Lanka, Southern Province, Sri Lanka
- Towns: Panadura, Kalutara, Matugama, Bentota, Elpitiya, Ambalangoda, Galle, Matara, Aparekka, Beliatta, Agunukolapelessa, Mattala, Hambantota

Highway system
- Roads in Sri Lanka; Expressways; A-Grade; B-Grade

The Southern Expressway (Sinhala: දක්ෂිණ ලංකා අධිවේගි මාර්ගය, romanized: Dakśina Langkâ Adiwêgi Mârgaya; Tamil: தென்னிலங்கை அதிவேக நெடுஞ்சாலை) is Sri Lanka's first expressway. The 222-kilometre-long (138 mi) highway links the Sri Lankan executive and judicial capital Colombo with Galle, Matara and Hambantota, major cities in the south of the island.

The Southern Expressway Project (SEP) was introduced by the Road Development Authority and the Ministry of Highways as far back as late 1980s. The University of Moratuwa undertook an Environment Impact Assessment study in 1996, which was submitted to the government in early 1997.

Construction of the highway began in 2003 and completion up to Galle was achieved by November 2011. March 2014 saw the section from Galle to Matara being declared open to the public. The construction of the expressway was partly funded by the Japan Bank for International Cooperation, who were responsible for the 65 km (40 mi) section between Kurundugahahetekma and Kokmaduwa, and the Asian Development Bank, responsible for the 161 km (100 mi) section between Kurundugahahetekma and Pinnaduwa. The expressway reduces the time taken to travel from Colombo to Galle (116 km (72 mi)) to one hour from three hours, and Colombo to Matara (29.3 km (18.2 mi)) to one and a half hours from four hours taken by the regular A2 highway.

The extension of the expressway to Hambantota was inaugurated on 4 July 2015. The extension will be four lanes (with allowance of further two lanes in future), the cost of US$180M being funded by the Exim Bank of China.

On 10 August 2015, a Highway Traffic Management system was inaugurated and currently covers the length of the expressway, including the Outer-Circular Expressway.

On 23 February 2020, The final stage of the expressway which links to Hambanthota was opened to the public.

== Intersections ==
Mileage	Interchange	Name	Destinations	Notes
0.0	1	Kottawa	A4 – Kottawa (1.8 km), Maharagama (6.3 km), Nugegoda (11.3 km), Colombo (20.6 km), Ratnapura (79.1 km), Avissawella (37 km), Homagama (2.2 km)	The start of the expressway; a continuation of the E02 Colombo Outer Circular Expressway
5.9	2	Kahathuduwa	B084 – Kesbewa (5.8 km), Piliyandala (8.1 km), Colombo (25.7 km), Horana (12.3 km), Ingiriya (25.9 km), Ratnapura (63.5 km)	This intersection will be the beginning point of E06 Ruwanpura Expressway, which will connect Rathnapura to the national expressway network. It was scheduled to be opened in 2019.
13.7	3	Gelanigama	A8 – Bandaragama (1.8 km), Panadura (11.6 km), Horana (6.9 km), Ingiriya (20.4 km), Ratnapura (58.1 km)	
34.8	4	Dodangoda	B304 – Nagoda (11.5 km), Kalutara (17.0 km), Matugama (5.5 km), Kalawana (36.3 km)	
46.0	5	Welipanna	B157 – Aluthgama (10.3 km), Matugama (11.5 km), Agalawatte (17.5 km)	
67.6	6	Kurundugahahetekma	B014 – Elpitiya (3.8 km), Karandeniya (6.0 km), Batapola (7.0 km), Ambalangoda (13.2 km), Balapitiya (13.5 km)	
79.8	7	Baddegama	B153 – Baddegama (1.5 km), Hikkaduwa (12.8 km), Nil Hena (2.4 km), Udugama (20.8 km)	
95.3	8	Pinnaduwa	B594 – Galle (8.4 km)	

== Earnings and traffic volumes ==
Year since opening	Annual earnings (billion) Rs	Average daily earnings (USD)	Annual traffic volume (million)	Average daily traffic volume	ROI on capital (billion) Rs	Earning per KM (USD)
2012	0.975	21,000	3.3	9000	-125.25	80,500
2013	-	-	-	-	-	-
2014	-	-	-	-	-	-

== Toll structure ==
Toll collection is currently done manually in cash by toll collectors. An electronic toll collection system has been proposed.
