= A4 road (Sri Lanka) =

Road in Sri Lanka

Coordinates: 6.851364°N 80.264536°E

A4 highway

Route information
- Length: 430 km (270 mi)

Major junctions
- North end: Colombo A1
- Kottawa - E02 Avissawela - A07 Rathnapura - A08 Pelmadulla - A18 Beragala - A16 Wellawaya - A23, A02 Hulandawa - A22 Siyambalanduwa - A25 Karaithivu - A31
- West end: Batticaloa A15

Location
- Country: Sri Lanka

Highway system
- Roads in Sri Lanka; Expressways; A-Grade; B-Grade
← A1	→ A15

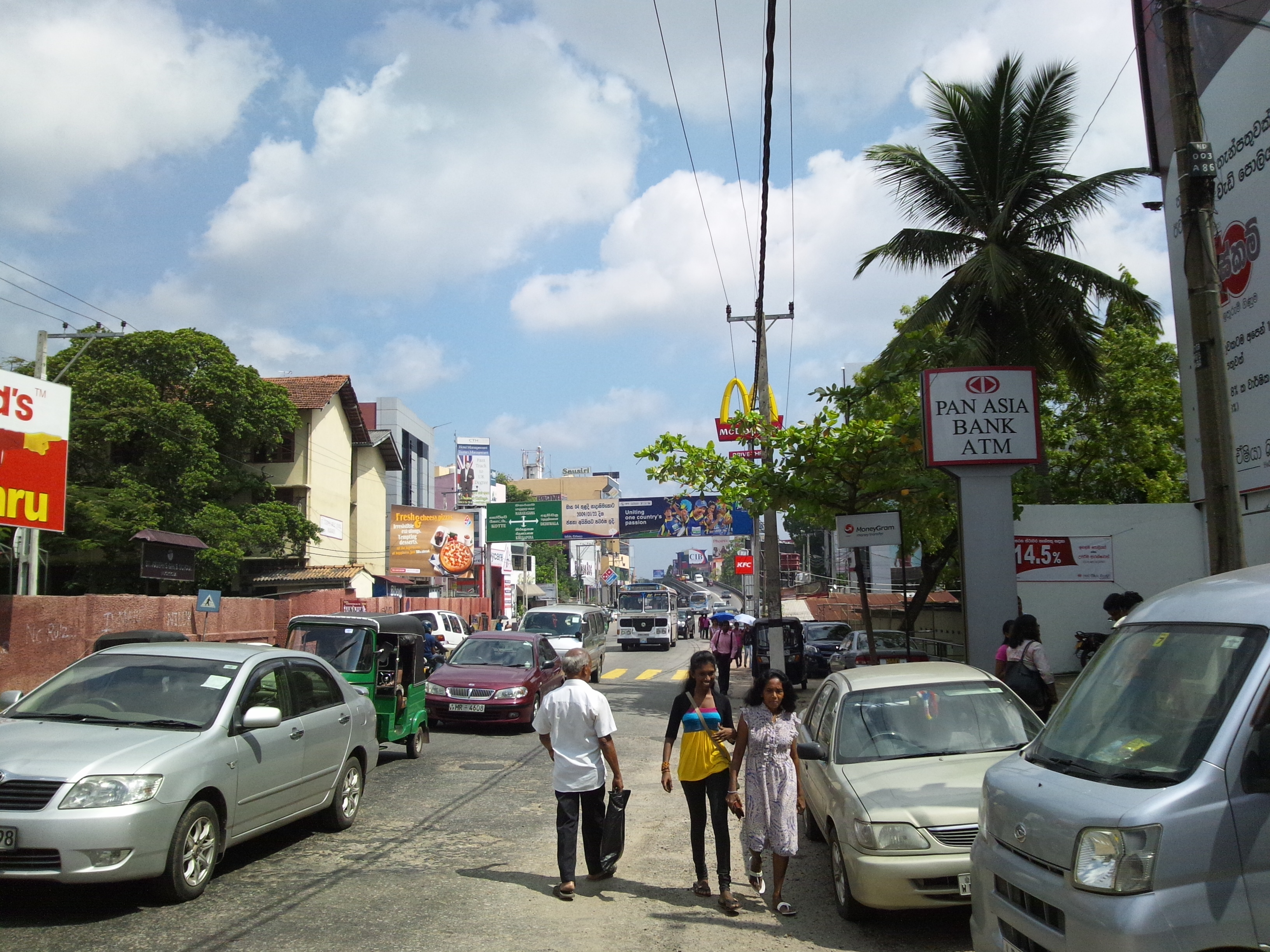
High Level Road in Nugegoda, Sri Lanka. It was taken from west to east.

The A4 Highway also known as the Colombo-Ratnapura-Wellawaya-Batticaloa highway, is the longest highway in Sri Lanka, at 430 kilometres (270 mi) in length. It goes Colombo to Batticaloa, through many important cities in Western, Sabaragamuwa, Uva and Eastern provinces.

The highway passes through Kirulapone, Nugegoda, Delkanda, Navinna, Maharagama, Pannipitiya, Kottawa, Homagama, Godagama, Meegoda, Meepe, Pahathgama, Hanwella, Avissawella, Eheliyagoda, Kuruwita, Ratnapura, Lellopitiya, Pelmadulla, Balangoda, Beragala, Koslanda, Wellawaya, Buttala, Monaragala, Liyangolla, Siyambalanduwa, Hulanuge, Lahugala, Pottuvil, Komari, Thirukovil, Akkaraipattu, Oluvil, Karaitivu, Kalmunai, Periyakallar, Chettipalayam, Arayampathy, and Kattankudy.

Bus Routes

- 99 - Colombo (Pettah) - Badulla / Passara / Welimada / Lunugala / Bibila
- 122 – Pettah - Avissawella / Rathnapura / Embilipitiya / Rakwana / Suriyawewa / Kataragama
- 124 – Maharagama – Ihala Bope
- 182 - Padukka - Hanwella
- 74/122 - Maharagama - Kandy
- 182/122 - Maharagama - Kandy
- 315 - Horana - Meepe
- 436/315/182/1 - Aluthgama - Kandy
- 285/315/182/1 - Matugama - Kandy
- 315/182/1 - Horana - Kandy
- 285/315/182/15 - Matugama - Jaffna
- 285/315/182/15 - Matugama - Anuradhapura
- 17/57 - Maharagama - Anuradhapura
- 450/315/182/48 - Panadura - Polonnaruwa
- 122/182/48 - Maharagama - Polonnaruwa

-Please note that route number 16 is Nawalapitiya - Colombo via Gampola/Peradeniya-

The stretch from Colombo up to Hanwella is known as the High Level Road.

== See also ==
- List of A-Grade highways in Sri Lanka
