= Ruwanpura Expressway (Sri Lanka) =

Road in Sri Lanka

Ratnapura Expressway

Route information
- Maintained by the Road Development Authority
- Length: 71.8 km (44.6 mi)
- History: Construction commenced 2026

Major junctions
- North end: Kahathuduwa E01 Southern Expressway
- South end: Pelmadulla A4

Location
- Country: Sri Lanka
- Provinces: Western Province, Sri Lanka, Sabaragamuwa Province, Sri Lanka
- Towns: Horana, Ingiriya, Kiriella, Kuruwita, Thiruwanaketiya, Ratnapura

Highway system
- Roads in Sri Lanka; Expressways; A-Grade; B-Grade

The Ruwanpura Expressway, also known as the Ratnapura Expressway will be Sri Lanka's sixth E Class highway. The 71.8-kilometre-long (44.6 mi) highway will link the Kahathuduwa exit on the Southern Expressway with Pelmadulla, a major city in Sabaragamuwa Province, Sri Lanka, via Ratnapura, the provincial capital of Sabargamuwa Province.

== Construction Attempts ==
In 2014, the government of President Mahinda Rajapaksa proposed and approved the project. Initially, construction was planned to commence in 2014 and be completed by 2019. During the 2014 presidential election campaign, he laid the foundation stone for the project. Political commentators pointed out that the foundation stone laying appeared to be a symbolic event carried out in public view during the election period, rather than evidence of actual construction having commenced.

Construction of the highway was then proposed to commence in January 2017 and be built in three stages. The construction contract was awarded to a Chinese Company. The expressway was then proposed to be completed by 2019. But constructions were not started.

In 2020, newly elected government cancelled the contract to the Chinese firm and started the construction works of 1st phase 26 kilometre section at a cost of 54.7 billion rupees with domestic finance. Contract was awarded to Sri Lanka–based Maga Constructions.However, no actual construction was undertaken.

== Project initiation ==
However, although the foundation stone was laid in 2014, by 2026 even the most basic step of acquiring the land had not been initiated. In 2025 the project was temporarily suspended due to the effects of the Sri Lankan economic crisis as the government was unable to continue funding the project. Instead construction of the Ratnapura railway track and the completion of the Central Expressway was prioritised.However, on 28 July 2026, Cabinet approval was granted to commence the procurement process for the first phase of restarting the Ruwanpura Expressway project under the government of Anura Kumara Dissanayake, with an estimated allocation of Rs. 15 billion.Accordingly, the construction of the Ruwanpura Expressway officially commenced..
