= List of A-Grade highways in Sri Lanka =

A-Grade Highways in Sri Lanka

System information
- Length: 3,720.310 km (2,311.693 mi)
- Formed: 1820
- Notes: Length by 2023

Highway names
- Highways: Highway XX (A XX)

System links
- Roads in Sri Lanka; Expressways; A-Grade; B-Grade

This is a list of A-grade roads in Sri Lanka sorted by route number. A class roads are further classified in to sub classes AA, AB and AC.

== Roads ==
=== Class AA Roads ===
Road Number	Route	Length (km)
A0	Kollupitiya-Sri Jayawardenapura	7.12
A1	Colombo-Kandy	115.85
A2	Colombo-Galle-Hambantota-Wellawaya	317.78
A3	Peliyagoda-Puttalam via Ja-Ela, Negombo and Chilaw	126
A4	Colombo-Ratnapura-Wellawaya-Batticaloa	430
A5	Peradeniya-Badulla-Chenkalady	276
A6	Ambepussa-Kurunegala-Trincomalee	198.71
A7	Avissawella-Nuwara Eliya	119
A8	Panadura-Ratnapura	68
A9	Kandy-Jaffna via Matale, Dambulla, Anuradhapura, Vavuniya, Killinochchi	321
A10	Katugastota-Puttalam	124.58
A11	Maradankadawala-Tirikkondiadimadu via Polonnaruwa	129.36
A12	Puttalam-Trincomalee	176.99
A13	Galkulama-Anuradhapura	17
A14	Medawachchiya-Talaimannar via Mannar	114
A15	Batticaloa-Trincomalee	131
A16	Beragala-Hali Ela	40
A17	Galle-Madampe	144
A18	Nonagama-Pelmadulla	88
A19	Polgahawela-Kegalle	12
A20	Anuradhapura-Rambewa	14
A21	Kegalle-Karawanella	42
A22	Passara-Monaragala	34
A23	Wellawaya-Kumbalwela	31
A24	Matara-Akuressa	20
A25	Siyambalanduwa-Ampara	57
A26	Kandy-Padiyathalawa	105
A27	Ampara-Maha Oya	58
A28	Anuradhapura-Padeniya	84
A29	Vavuniya-Horowpothana	46
A30	Vavuniya-Parayanalankulam	36
A31	Ampara-Karaitivu	24
A32	Navatkuli-Mannar via Kerativu	98
A33	Ja Ela-Yakkala via Gampaha	17
A34	Mankulam-Mullaitivu	49
A35	Paranthan-Mullaitivu	52
Total Distance		3723.39 km

=== Class AB Roads ===
Road Number	Route	Length (km)
AB001	Ampara - Inginiyagala	19.79
AB002	Anuradhapura New Town Roads	12.66
AB003	Approach Road to Gampola Bridge	0.48
AB004	Approach Road to Kaduwela Bridge	0.77
AB005	Approach Road to Sri Jayewardenepura Hospital	2.46
AB006	Avissawella Town Road	0.06
AB007	Balangoda By Pass	1.13
AB008	Bandarawela By Pass	0.51
AB009	Canada Friend-ship Road	2.4
AB010	Colombo - Hanwella Low Level Road	24.94
AB011	Galle Road New Deviation (Cross Junc. to Egoda Uyana)	6.98
AB012	Galle - Marine Drive	1.22
AB013	Gampola - Nawalapitiya	17.54
AB014	Hospital - Esplanade road, Ratnapura	1.66
AB015	Inner ring Road	3.8
AB016	Jaffna - Kankesanthurai	18.5
AB017	Jaffna - Manipay - Karainagar	27.21
AB018	Jaffna - Palaly	17.3
AB019	Jaffna - Pannai - Kayts	19.31
AB020	Jaffna - Point Pedro	33.79
AB021	Jaffna - Ponnalai - Point Pedro	55.38
AB022	Jail Road, Hambantota	0.43
AB023	Kalattawa - Matale Junction	6.44
AB024	Link Road—Dambulla	1
AB025	Lion Pillar - Sri Maha Bodhi Road	1.21
AB026	Matale - Udupihilla	6.03
AB027	Old Colombo - Galle Road, Panadura	1.9
AB028	Old Colombo - Puttalam Road, Ja Ela	0.95
AB029	Pasyala - Giriulla	19.31
AB030	Poonakary - Sangupiddy	8.85
AB031	Puloly - Kodikamam - Kachchai	18.91
AB032	Puttur - Meesalai	13.68
AB033	Samanturai village Road	1.85
AB034	Sea Street, Galle	0.16
AB035	Section A - B NEW TOWN ROAD, Ratnapura	1.85
AB036	Thalapitiya road, Galle	0.98
AB037	Upper Gampola Road	2.57
AB038	Valachchenai - Nasavantivu - Nawaladi	5.12
AB039	Valukkairaru - Pungudutivu - Kurikadduwan	24.54
AB040	Wattala Deviation	0.64
AB041	Weligama By Pass	4.18
AB042	Getambe Kandy By Pass	3.8
AB043	Wellawaya By Pass	1.15
AB044	Mahiyangana - Dimbulagala - Dalukkane	72.6
AB045	Avissawela By pass	0.88
Total Distance		466.92 km

=== Class AC Roads ===
Road Number	Route	Length (km)
AC002	Bauddhaloka Mawatha (Buller's Road)	2.77
AC003	Central Road	0.6
AC004	Cotta Road up to City Limit	1.37
AC005	Danister De Silva Mawatha (Baseline Road)	2.56
AC006	D.R.Wijewardana Mawatha (McCallum Road)	1.9
AC007	D.S.Senanayake Mawatha (Kanatta Road)	0.53
AC008	Elvitigala Mawatha (Narahenpita Road - Kanatta Junc.)	1.88
AC009	Fifth Cross Street	0.32
AC010	Gas Work street	0.34
AC011	George R De Silva Mawatha (Skinners's Road)	1.09
AC012	Havelock Road - Maya Avenue Junction to Pamankada Bridge	1.13
AC013	Jayantha Weerasekara Mawatha (Drieberg's avenue)	0.77
AC014	Layards Broadway road - Barber Street to Prince of Wales Avenue	0.26
AC015	Lotus Road	0.93
AC016	Maha Vidyala Mawatha (Barber Street)	0.53
AC017	Main Street from Lotus road to Reclamation road	0.23
AC018	Maligawatta Road - Jayantha Weerasekera Mw. to Sri Saddhamma Mw.	0.27
AC019	Maradana Road	2.59
AC020	N.H.M.Abdul Cader Mawatha (Reclamation road)	0.51
AC021	Pamankada Road	0.32
AC022	Panchikawatta Road - Maradana Road to Janaytha Weerasekara Mw.	0.14
AC023	Part Sri Ramanathan Mw. - (K'boam St. to Skinnders's rd. junc.)	0.31
AC024	Prince of Wales Avenue	2.25
AC025	Railway Road	0.32
AC026	Sea Beach Road	0.45
AC027	Sri Dharmarama Mawatha (Albion Road)	0.48
AC028	Sri Saddharma Mawatha (Ingram Road)	0.88
AC029	Sri Sangaraja Mawatha (Skinner's Road [South])	0.93
AC030	Sri Sumanatissa Mawatha (Armour Street)	0.66
AC031	St. Anthony's Mawatha (Kochchikade Road)	0.34
AC032	W.A. de Silva Mawatha (High Street)	0.92
Total Distance		30.19 km

== See also ==
- List of B-Grade highways in Sri Lanka
- List of E-Grade expressways in Sri Lanka
- Highway museum complex, Kiribathkumbura
