= A5 road (Sri Lanka) =

Road in Sri Lanka

Coordinates: 7.009451°N 80.734084°E

A5 highway

Route information
- Maintained by Road Development Authority
- Length: 275.64 km (171.27 mi)

Major junctions
- West end: Peradeniya (Merging with A1)
- Nuwara Eliya - A07 Hali-Ela - A16 Passara - A22 Padiyathalawa - A26 Maha Oya - A27
- East end: Chenkalady

Location
- Country: Sri Lanka

Highway system
- Roads in Sri Lanka; Expressways; A-Grade; B-Grade

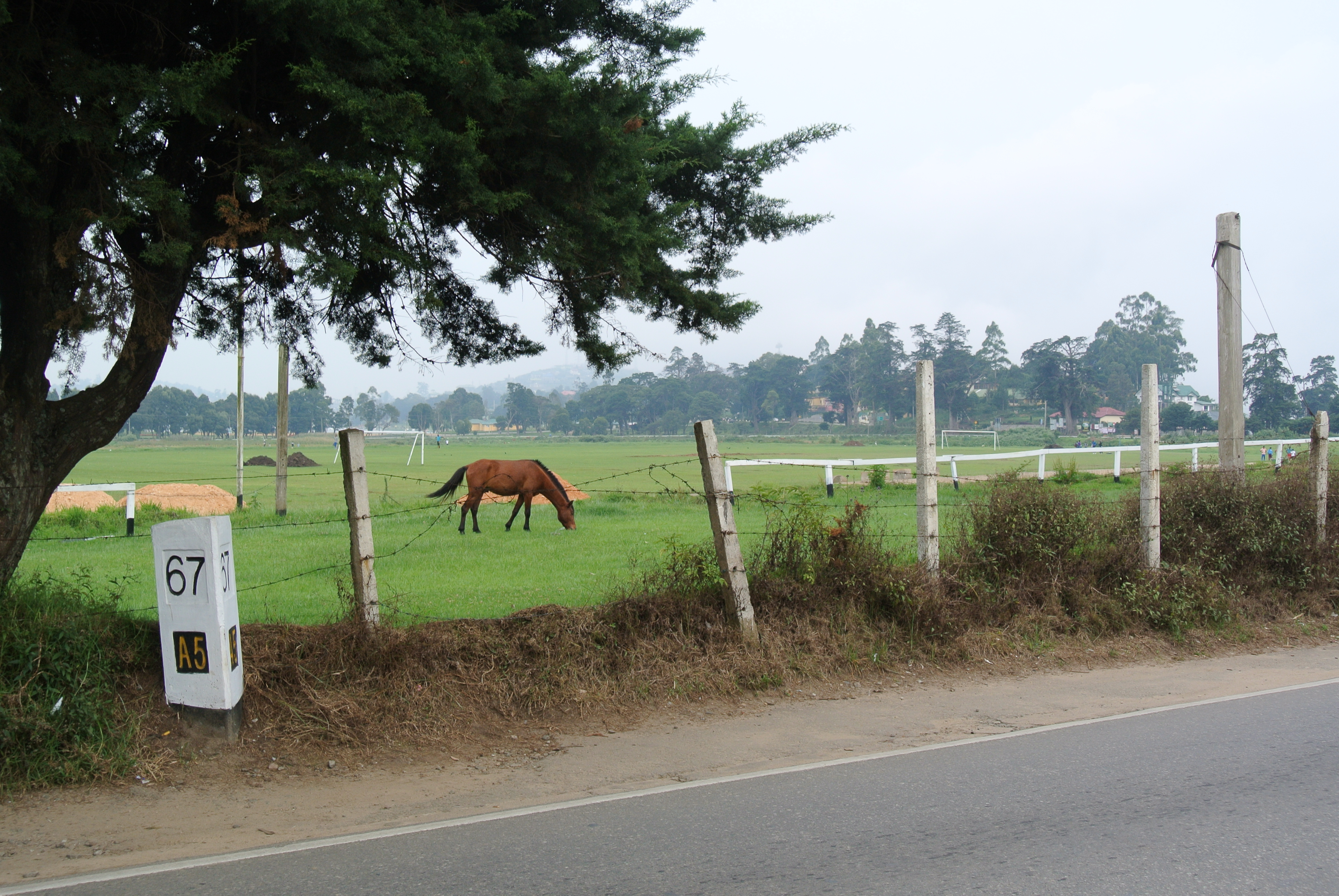
Marker on the A5 highway in Nuwara Eliya

The A 5 road is an A-Grade trunk road in Sri Lanka. It connects the Peradeniya

with Chenkalady via Badulla.

It is also known as "PBC Highway", a shortened term for Peradeniya-Badulla-Chenkalady.

The A 5 passes through Geli Oya, Gampola, Pussellawa, Nuwara Eliya, Keppetipola, Welimada, Hali-Ela, Badulla, Passara, Lunugala, Bibile, Padiyathalawa, Maha Oya, Thumpalancholai and Karadiyanaru to reach Chenkalady.
