= Western Province, Sri Lanka =

Province of Sri Lanka

Western Province බස්නාහිර පළාත மேல் மாகாணம்
- Province
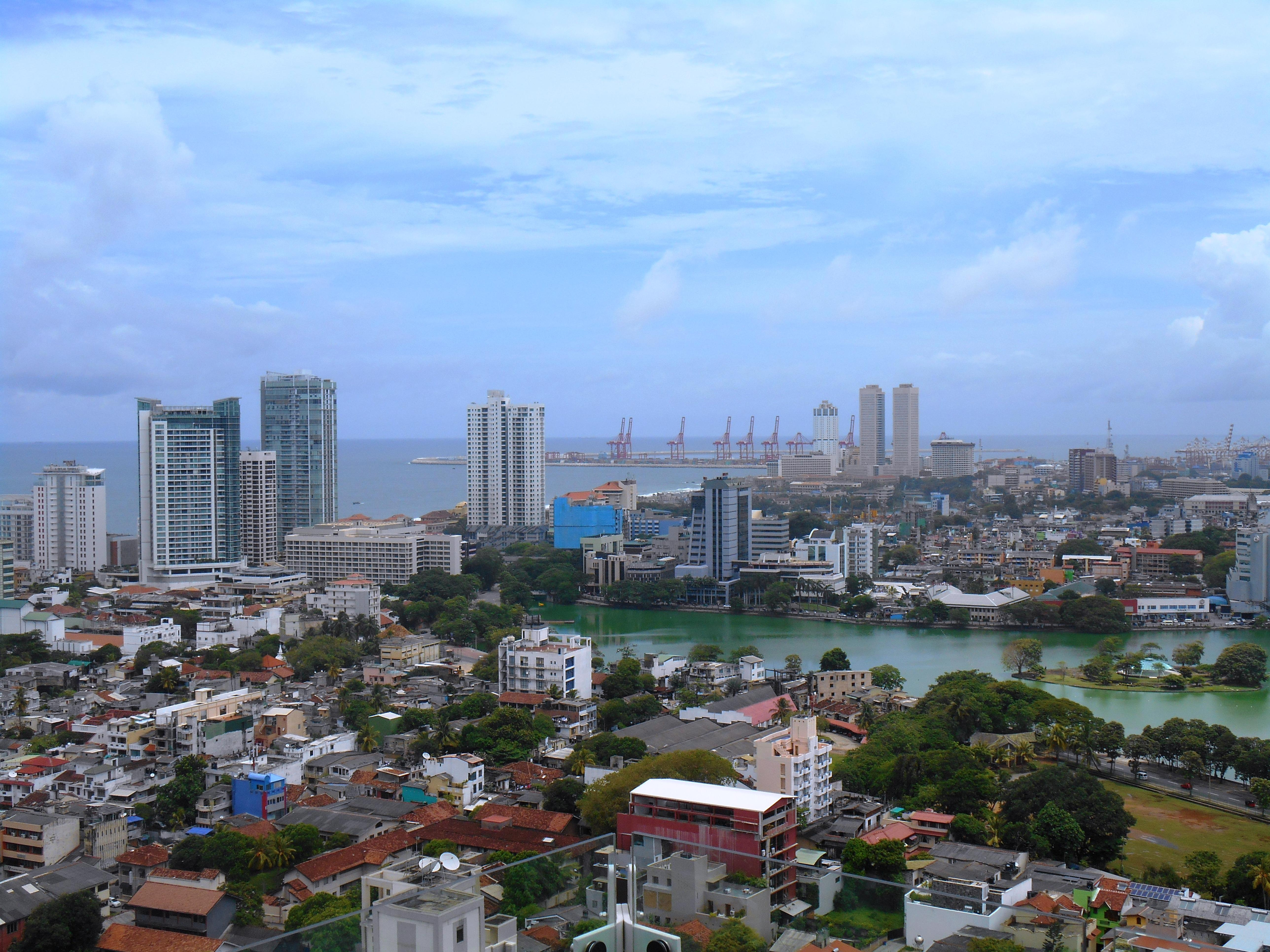
- Colombo

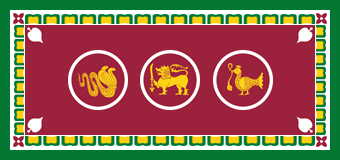
- Flag

- Location within Sri Lanka
- Coordinates: 06°50′N 80°05′E
- Country: Sri Lanka
- Created: 1 October 1833
- Provincial council: 14 November 1987
- Capital: Colombo
- Largest City: Colombo
- Major Cities: List: * Gampaha; * Negombo; * Kalutara; * Kaduwela; * Dehiwala; * Kotte; * Kesbewa; * Moratuwa
- Districts: List: Colombo; Gampaha; Kalutara

Government
  - Type: Provincial council
  - Body: Western Provincial Council
  - Governor: Hanif Yusuf

Area
  - Total: 3,758 km^{2} (1,451 sq mi)
  - Land: 3,664 km^{2} (1,415 sq mi)
  - Rank: 9th (5.61% of total area)

Population (2024 census)
  - Total: 6,117,341
  - Rank: 1st (28.73% of total pop.)
  - Density: 1,670/km^{2} (4,324/sq mi)

Ethnicity (2012 census)
  - Sinhalese: 4,905,425 (84.26%)
  - Sri Lankan Moors: 450,505 (7.74%)
  - Sri Lankan Tamil: 335,751 (5.77%)
  - Indian Tamil: 61,826 (1.06%)
  - Other: 68,203 (1.17%)

Religion (2012 census)
  - Buddhism: 4,288,797 (73.67%)
  - Catholicism: 752,993 (12.93%)
  - Islam: 500,992 (8.61%)
  - Hinduism: 274,336 (4.71%)
  - Other: 4,592 (0.08%)
- Time zone: UTC+05:30 (Sri Lanka)
- Post Codes: 00000-19999
- Telephone Codes: 011, 031, 033, 034, 036, 038
- ISO 3166 code: LK-1
- Vehicle registration: WP
- Official Languages: Sinhalese, English, Tamil
- Flower: White Lotus (Nymphaea lotus)
- Butterfly: Ceylon Blue Glassy Tiger (Ideopsis similis)
- Website: www.wp.gov.lk

The Western Province (Sinhala: බස්නාහිර පළාත Basnāhira Paḷāta; Tamil: மேல் மாகாணம் Mael Mākāṇam) is one of the nine provinces of Sri Lanka, the first level administrative division of the country. The provinces have existed since the 19th century but did not have any legal status until 1987 when the 13th Amendment to the Constitution of Sri Lanka established provincial councils.

== History ==
Parts of present-day Western Province were part of the pre-colonial Kingdom of Kotte. The province then came under Portuguese, Dutch and British control. In 1815 the British gained control of the entire island of Ceylon. They divided the island into three ethnic based administrative structures: Low Country Sinhalese, Kandyan Sinhalese and Tamil. The Western Province was part of the Low Country Sinhalese administration. In 1833, in accordance with the recommendations of the Colebrooke-Cameron Commission, the ethnic based administrative structures were unified into a single administration divided into five geographic provinces. The districts of Chilaw, Colombo, Kalutara, Puttalam, Seven Korales (present day Kurunegala District), Three Korales, Four Korales and Lower Bulatgama (present day Kegalle District) formed the new Western Province. Chilaw District, Puttalam District and Seven Korales were transferred to the newly created North Western Province in 1845. Three Korales, Four Korales and Lower Bulatgama were transferred to the newly created Sabaragamuwa Province in 1889.

It is planned to create a planned Megacity under the Western Region Megapolis Plan in the Western Province designed by Surbana. Originally initiated in 2004 by Ranil Wickremesinghe it was stopped after his election defeat and was restarted again after his return to power in 2015. The project plans to merge Colombo, Gampaha and Kalutara districts and introduce zoning.

== Geography and climate ==
Western Province is located in the southwest of Sri Lanka. It has an area of 3,684 square kilometres (1,422 sq mi), making it the smallest of the country's nine provinces. The province is surrounded by the Laccadive Sea to the west, North Western Province to the north, Sabaragamuwa Province to the east and the Southern Province to the south.

The Western Province is vulnerable to recurrent flooding as a result of an increase in average rainfall coupled with heavier rainfall events, with knock-on impacts on the infrastructure, utility supply, and the urban economy of the Province. As the most urbanised province in Sri Lanka, these climate events pose a number of problems due to the rapid urban growth the province has undergone.

== Administrative divisions ==
=== Districts ===
The Western Province is divided into three administrative districts, 40 Divisional Secretary's Divisions (DS Divisions) and 2,505 Grama Niladhari Divisions (GN Divisions).

District	Capital	District Secretary	DS Divisions	GN Divisions	Total Area (km^{2})	Land Area (km^{2})	Population (2012 Census)						Population Density (/km^{2})
District	Capital	District Secretary	DS Divisions	GN Divisions	Total Area (km^{2})	Land Area (km^{2})	Sinhalese	Sri Lankan Moors	Sri Lankan Tamil	Indian Tamil	Other	Total	Population Density (/km^{2})
Colombo	Colombo	Sunil Kannangara	13	566	699	676	1,771,319	242,728	231,318	27,336	37,108	2,309,809	3,304
Gampaha	Gampaha	J. J. Rathnasiri	13	1,177	1,387	1,341	2,079,115	95,501	80,071	10,879	29,075	2,294,641	1,654
Kalutara	Kalutara	U. D. C. Jayalal	14	762	1,598	1,576	1,054,991	112,276	24,362	23,611	2,020	1,217,260	762
Total			40	2,505	3,684	3,593	4,905,425	450,505	335,751	61,826	68,203	5,821,710	1,580

=== Major population centres ===
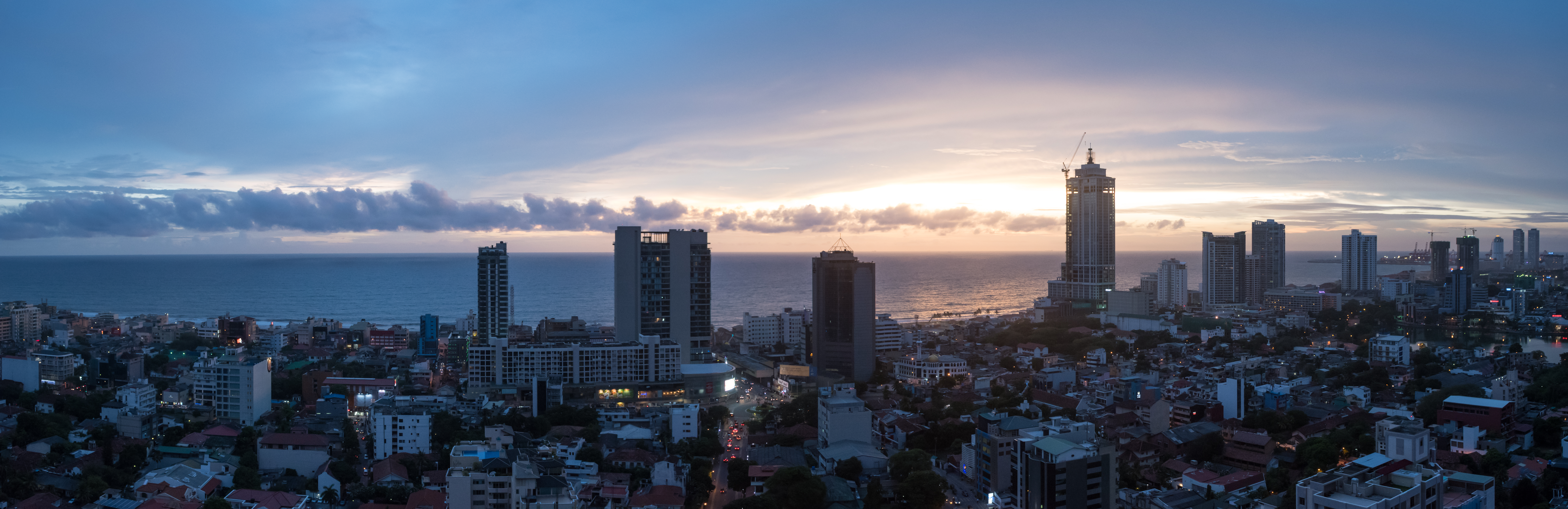
Colombo is the most populous city and the largest city in Sri Lanka

Largest cities or towns in Western Province, Sri Lanka As per the 2024 Census
Rank		District	Pop.
1	Colombo	Colombo	639,818
2	Kaduwela	Colombo	252,041
3	Dehiwala-Mount Lavinia	Colombo	219,827
4	Maharagama	Colombo	196,423
5	Moratuwa	Colombo	185,031
6	Kesbewa	Colombo	245,232
7	Negombo	Gampaha	137,223
8	Sri Jayawardenepura Kotte	Colombo	115,826
9	Gampaha	Gampaha	9,350
10	Katunayake	Gampaha	84,643

== Demographics ==
=== Population ===
The Western Province's population was 6,117,341 in 2024. Western Province has a sex ratio of 93.83 females per 100 males. The majority of the population are Sinhalese, with a minority Sri Lankan Moor and Sri Lankan Tamil population.

=== Ethnicity ===
Ethnicity in Western Province (2024)
1. Sinhala (83.6%)
2. Sri Lankan Moors (8.91%)
3. Sri Lankan Tamils (6.26%)
4. Others (1.21%)

Population of Western Province by ethnic group 1981 to 2012
Year	Sinhalese		Sri Lankan Moors		Sri Lankan Tamil		Indian Tamil		Other		Total No.
Year	No.	%	No.	%	No.	%	No.	%	No.	%	Total No.
1981 Census	3,321,830	84.74%	238,728	6.09%	228,516	5.83%	59,402	1.51%	71,331	1.82%	3,919,807
2001 Census	4,530,918	84.20%	374,729	6.96%	325,706	6.05%	61,337	1.14%	88,507	1.64%	5,381,197
2012 Census	4,905,425	84.26%	450,505	7.74%	335,751	5.77%	61,826	1.06%	68,203	1.17%	5,821,710

Sinhalese are the largest group in the province, and are particularly concentrated in areas outside Colombo. Moors and Tamils are concentrated in Colombo and its suburbs.

=== Religion ===
Religion in Western Province (2024)
1. Buddhism (73.7%)
2. Catholicism (10.1%)
3. Islam (9.34%)
4. Hinduism (5.06%)
5. Other Christianity (1.76%)
6. Others (0.04%)

Population of Western Province by religion 1981 to 2012
Year	Buddhist		Christian (Note: Roman Catholic and Other Christian.)		Muslim		Hindu		Other		Total No.
Year	No.	%	No.	%	No.	%	No.	%	No.	%	Total No.
1981 Census	2,885,789	73.62%	556,581	14.20%	279,639	7.13%	194,000	4.95%	3,798	0.10%	3,919,807
2001 Census	3,942,171	73.26%	721,115	13.40%	441,397	8.20%	271,777	5.05%	4,737	0.09%	5,381,197
2012 Census	4,288,797	73.67%	752,993	12.93%	500,992	8.61%	274,336	4.71%	4,592	0.08%	5,821,710

Buddhism is the largest religion, practiced by the ethnic Sinhala majority. Catholicism is mainly practied by Sinhalese, while Muslims are found among the Moor and Malay population.

== Economy ==
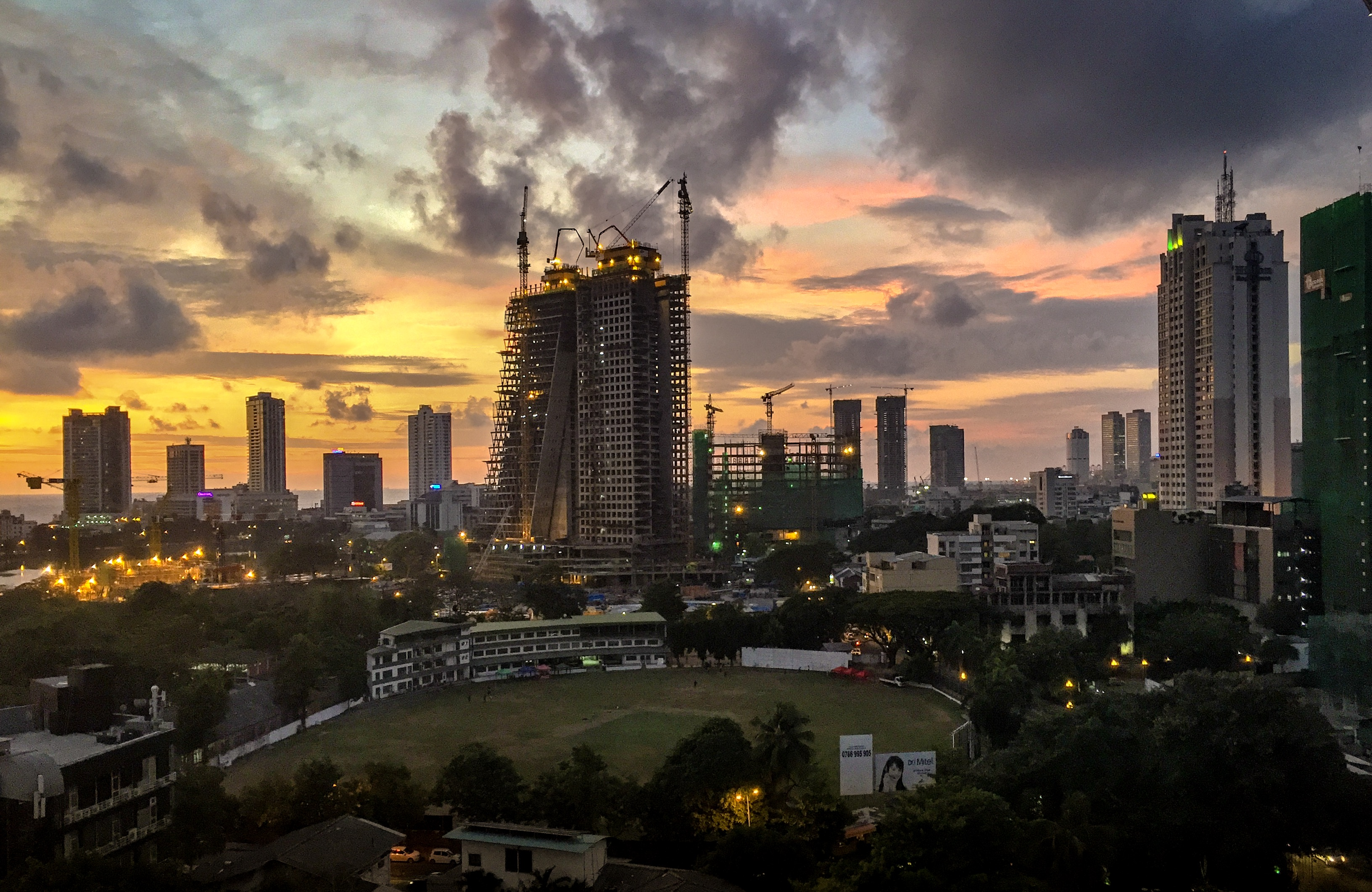
Colombo the commercial capital of Sri Lanka

The Western province provides the highest contribution to the Gross Domestic Product contributing 41.2% of the Provincial Gross Domestic Product(PGDP) and has a nominal PGDP growth rate of 5.8% as of 2015. Agriculture only made up 1.7% of the GDP the lowest among the nine provinces while Industrial sector made up 34.6% the highest in the country and service sector represented 56.5%.

The province is undergoing rapid development with several of the largest infrastructure development projects happening in the province such as the Colombo International Financial City(CIFC) which is an International Financial Zone and the Western Region Megapolis Planning Project(WRMPP) Western province is also undergoing a major real estate and construction boom with residential and commercial buildings and skyscrapers changing the skylines of cities such as Colombo and Rajagiriya. Several major residential, office and hotel buildings as well as resorts and malls are either proposed or under construction.

The Colombo Harbour is also a major driver of economic growth being the busiest port in South Asia. It has both privately run and state owned terminals and is being expanded.

== Education ==
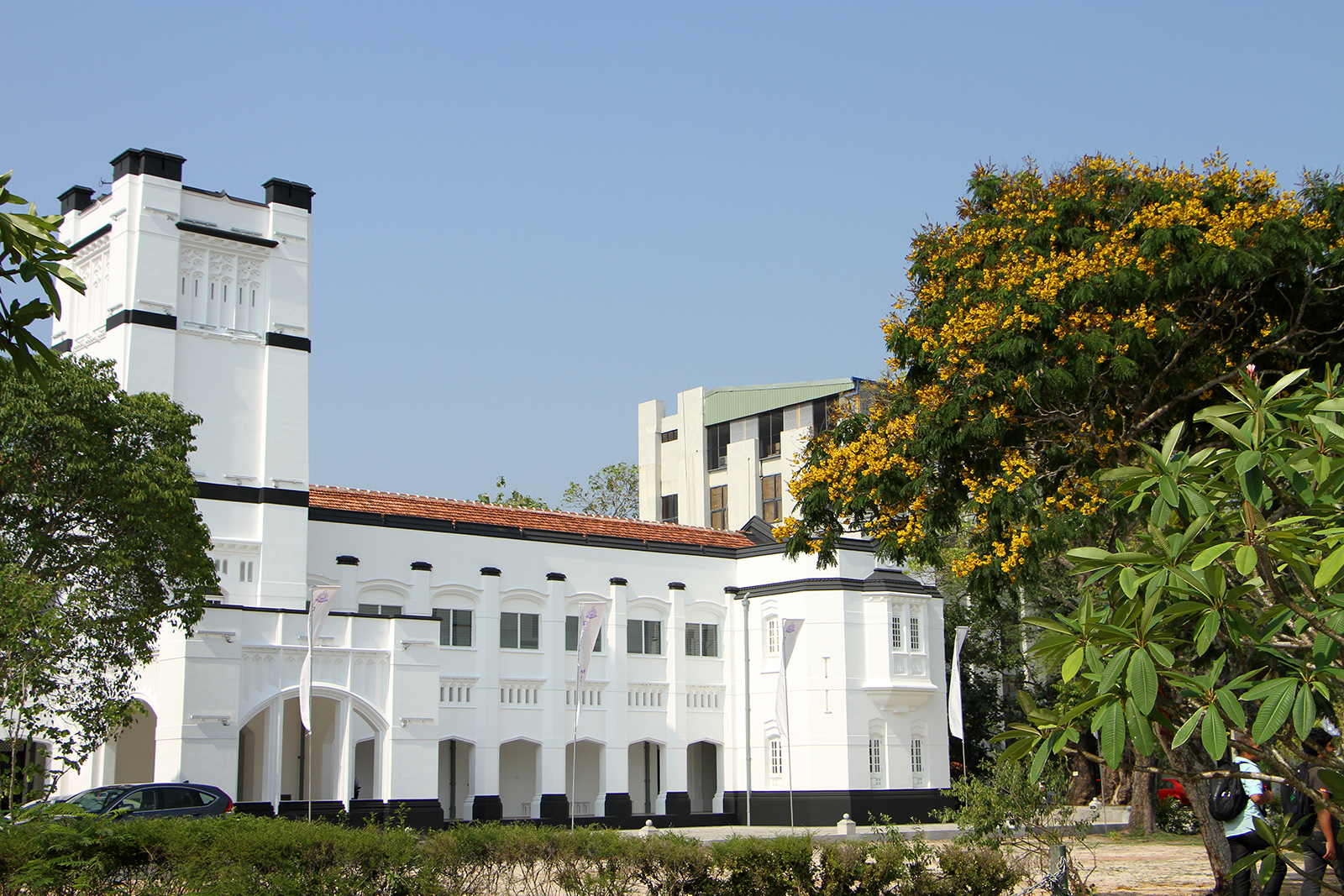
University of Colombo

Almost all the premier educational institutions in the island are located in the Western Province. Universities in the province includes the University of Colombo, University of Kelaniya, University of Moratuwa, University of Sri Jayewardenepura, Open University, Sri Lanka, Buddhist and Pali University of Sri Lanka, General Sir John Kotelawala Defence University, National Institute of Business Management and the Sri Lanka Institute of Information Technology. Having the highest population in all the provinces, Western Province has the largest number of schools in the country, which includes national, provincial, private and international schools.

== Transportation ==
=== Expressways in Western Province ===
- E01 Southern Expressway
- E02 Outer Circular Expressway
- E03 Colombo-Katunayake Expressway

=== International Highways in Western Province ===
- AH43

=== National Highways in Western Province ===
- A0 Kollupitiya to Sri Jayawardenapura Kotte
- A1 Colombo to Dummaladeniya
- A2 Colombo to Alutgama
- A3 Colombo to kochchikade
- A4 Colombo to Avissawella
- A8 Panadura to Nambapana
- A33 Ja Ela to Yakkala

== See also ==
- List of settlements in Western Province (Sri Lanka)
- Provinces of Sri Lanka
- Districts of Sri Lanka
