= Thenmarachchi =

Thenmarachchi தென்மராட்சி තෙන්මරච්චි
- Region
- Location within Sri Lanka
- Coordinates: 09°42′N 80°12′E
- Country: Sri Lanka
- Province: Northern
- District: Jaffna
- Largest town: Chavakacheri
- Divisional Secretariats: List: Thenmarachchi

Area
  - Total: 229.4 km^{2} (88.6 sq mi)

Population (2007)
  - Total: 55,478
  - Density: 241.8/km^{2} (626.4/sq mi)
- Time zone: UTC+05:30 (Sri Lanka)

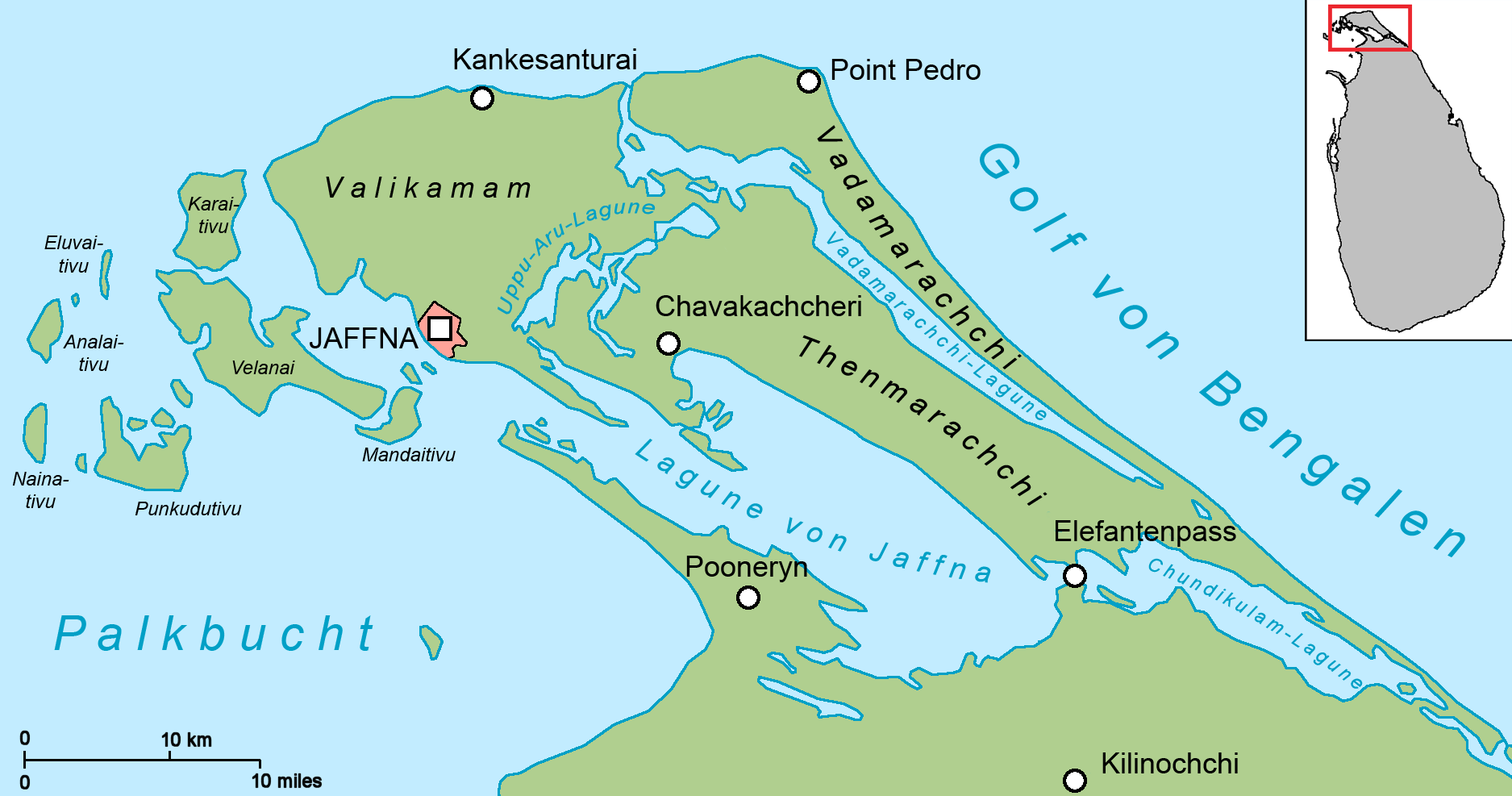
Map of the Jaffna Peninsula

Thenmarachchi is one of the three historic regions of the Jaffna Peninsula in northern Sri Lanka. The other two regions are Vadamarachchi and Valikamam. Thenmarachchi is sometimes spelt Thenmarachi, Thenmaraachi or Thenmaraadchi. This area, like the entire Jaffna Peninsula, is populated mostly by Tamil people and was for many years under the de facto control of the "Tamil Tigers".

== Etymology ==
Thenmarachchi translates to "possession of southerners" or "rule of the southerners" in English. It is derived from the Tamil words thenmar (southerners) and achchi (possession or rule).

== Cities and villages in Thenmarachchi ==
1. Varani
2. Navatkadu
3. Idaikurichchi
4. Thavalai, Iyattralai
5. Kodikamam
6. Kaithady
7. Navatkuli
8. Thachchanthoppu
9. Sarasalai
10. Mattuvil
11. Chavakachcheri
12. Maravanpulavu
13. Arukkuveli
14. Nunavil
15. Meesalai
16. Kachchai
17. Mirusuvil
18. Ottuveli
19. Vidaththalpalai
20. Keratheevu
21. Kerudavil
22. Anthananthidal
23. Allarai
24. Paalavi
25. Ketpeli
26. Thanankilapu
27. Usan
28. Manthuvil
29. Kilali
30. Eluthumattuval

== See also ==
- Kachchai
- Vadamarachchi
- Valikamam
