= A2 highway (Sri Lanka) =

Road in Sri Lanka

Coordinates: 6.751896°N 79.899445°E

Route information
- Part of Asian Highway AH43
- Maintained by the Road Development Authority

Major junctions
- South end: Wellawaya
- North end: Colombo Fort

Location
- Country: Sri Lanka
- Major cities: Colombo,Panadura Kalutara, Galle, Matara, Hambantota

Highway system
- Roads in Sri Lanka; Expressways; A-Grade; B-Grade

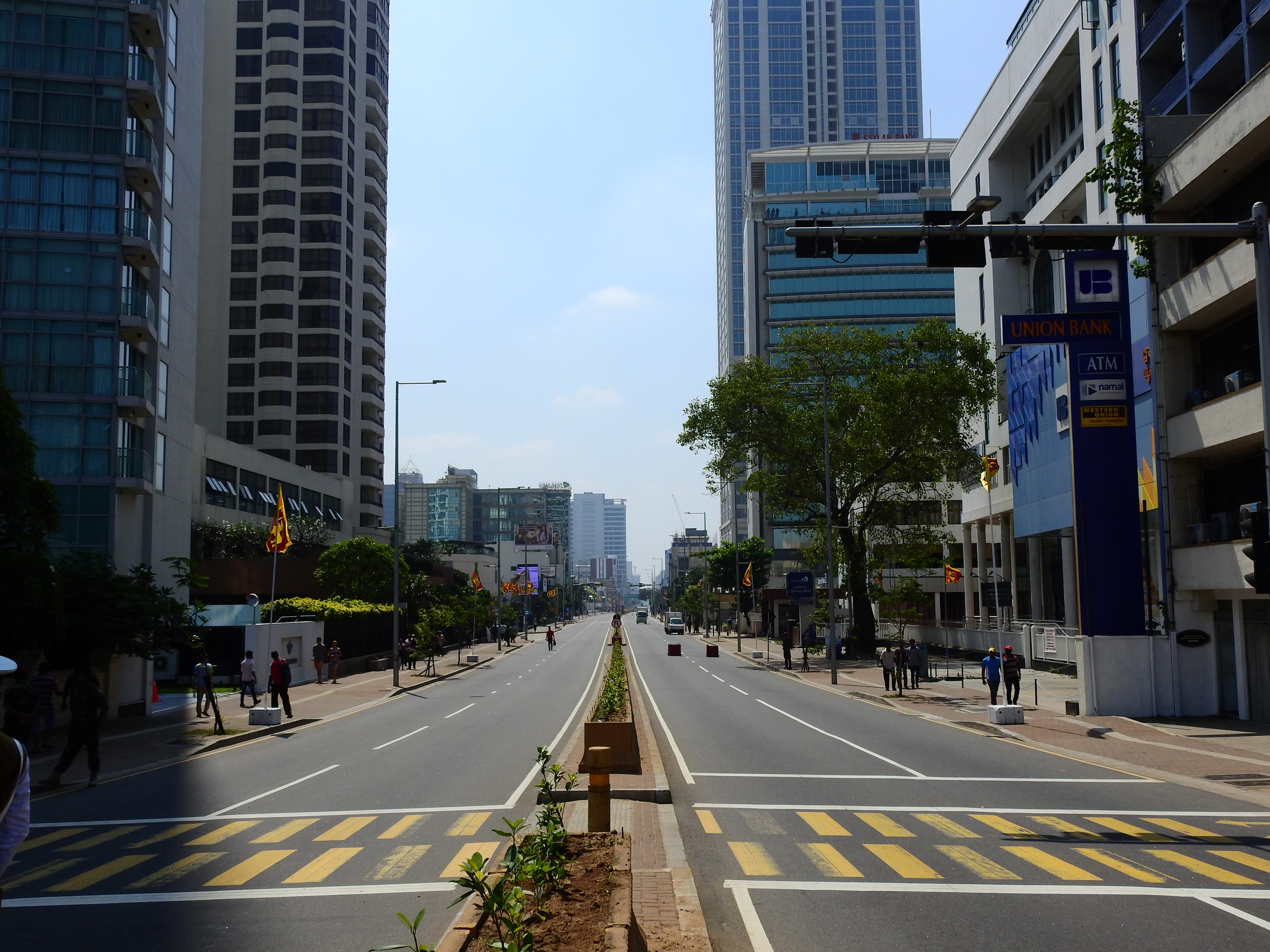
Segment of the A2 Highway, looking south between Crescat Residencies (tall building on left) and Grand Hyatt Colombo (tall building on right).

The A 2 Highway is an A-Grade road in Sri Lanka. It connects Colombo and Wellawaya via Panadura Kalutara, Galle, Matara and Hambantota.

== Route ==
=== Colombo to Galle ===
The west-coast portion of the highway consists of the Galle Road. Within Colombo, the A2 serves as a north–south backbone to the city. It is split into two one-way streets from Colombo Fort to Wellawatte, in order to ease traffic flow.

The highway passes through Bambalapitiya, Dehiwala, Ratmalana,Panadura, Kalutara, Beruwala, Bentota, Ambalangoda, Hikkaduwa and Galle. At Galle, the highway runs through the city centre before continuing towards Hambantota.

=== Galle to Hambantota ===
From Galle, the highway continues east along the south coast towards Ahangama. It passes Unawatuna, Koggala, Ahangama and Weligama, before arriving at Matara. At Matara, it passes the University of Ruhuna. The highway continues towards Dikwella, Tangalle, Ambalantota, and Hambantota. To cross the artificial harbour at Hambantota, a harbour-bypass road allows the A2 to continue to Wellawaya.

=== Hambantota to Wellawaya ===
After the Hambantota Harbour, the A2 turns north and passes Weligatta, Tanamalwila, Kuda Oya and Teluulla before reaching Wellawaya. At Wellawaya, it meets the A4 and A23 highways.

== Asian Highways ==
The A2 forms part of the Asian Highways route AH43. AH43 is unsigned while on the A2.

== See also ==
- List of A-Grade highways in Sri Lanka
- E01 expressway (Sri Lanka), expressway built to reduce the traffic load on the A2.
