= A29 =

A29 or A-29 may refer to:

== Aircraft ==
- A-29 Hudson, a Lockheed World War II aircraft
- Aero A.29, a Czech target tug floatplane of the 1920s
- Focke-Wulf A 29, a variant of the 1927 German Focke-Wulf A 17 airliner with a BMW VI engine
- A-29, another name of the Embraer EMB 314 Super Tucano

== Roads ==
- A29 road (England), a road connecting Capel and Bognor Regis
- A29 autoroute, a road in France connecting Le Havre with the A26 autoroute at Saint-Quentin
- A 29 motorway (Germany), a road connecting Wilhelmshaven and Oldenburg
- Autostrada A29 (Italy), a road connecting Palermo and Mazara del Vallo
- A29 motorway (Netherlands), a road connecting Rotterdam and Steenbergen
- A29 road (Northern Ireland), a road connecting Portrush and Coleraine
- A29 road (Sri Lanka), a road connecting Vavuniya and Horowpathana

== Other uses ==
- HLA-A29, a human serotype
- Spasmolytic A29, a drug
