= A28 road (Sri Lanka) =

Road in Sri Lanka

Coordinates: 7.888548°N 80.247917°E

The A28 road is an A-Grade trunk road in Sri Lanka. It connects Anuradhapura with Padeniya.

The A28 passes through Talawa, Tambuttegama, Mahagalkadawala, Galgamuwa, Ambanpola and Daladagama to reach Padeniya.
