= Kahathuduwa =

- town
- Location within Sri Lanka
- Coordinates: 6°47′3.00″N 79°58′52″E
- Country: Sri Lanka
- Province: Western Province
- District: Colombo District
- Time zone: UTC+5:30 (SLT)
  - Summer (DST): UTC+6
- Postal code: 10300

Kahathuduwa is a small town in the Colombo District of the Western Province of Sri Lanka. It is located approximately 28.3 kilometres (17.6 mi) south east of Colombo. It has interchange to southern express way

== Transportation ==
Kahathuduwa is located on the B84 (Colombo to Horana Road) and is situated at the second exit (Exit 2) on the E01 (Southern Expressway) and will be the beginning point of E06 (Ruwanpura Expressway), connecting Rathnapura and Pelmadulla to the national expressway network.

== Public Facilities ==
- District Hospital Kahathuduwa
- Police Station
- Post Office
