= A28 =

A28 or A-28 may refer to:

== Roads ==
- A28 road (England), a road in Kent connecting Margate, Canterbury, Ashford, Tenterden and Hastings
- A28 motorway (France), a road connecting Abbeville, Somme and Tours, Indre-et-Loire
- A 28 motorway (Germany), a road connecting Leer and Oldenburg with Bremen
- A28 road (Isle of Man), a road connecting New and the Ballanorris road
- A28 motorway (Italy), a road connecting Conegliano and Portogruaro
- A28 motorway (Netherlands), a road connecting Utrecht and Groningen
- A28 motorway (Portugal), a road connecting Porto to Viana do Castelo
- A 28 road (Sri Lanka), a road connecting Anuradhapura and Padeniya
- A28 (Sydney), a road in Sydney which is commonly known as Cumberland Highway

== Other uses ==
- A-28 Hudson, a Lockheed World War II aircraft
- Aeroprakt A-28 Victor, a 2000s Ukrainian twin engined aircraft design
- Focke-Wulf A 28, a 1927 German airliner
- HLA-A28, a human serotype
- Asahikawa Station, a station in Asahikawa, Hokkaido, Japan, station code A28
