= A30 highway (Sri Lanka) =

Road in Sri Lanka

Coordinates: 8.760357°N 80.43093°E

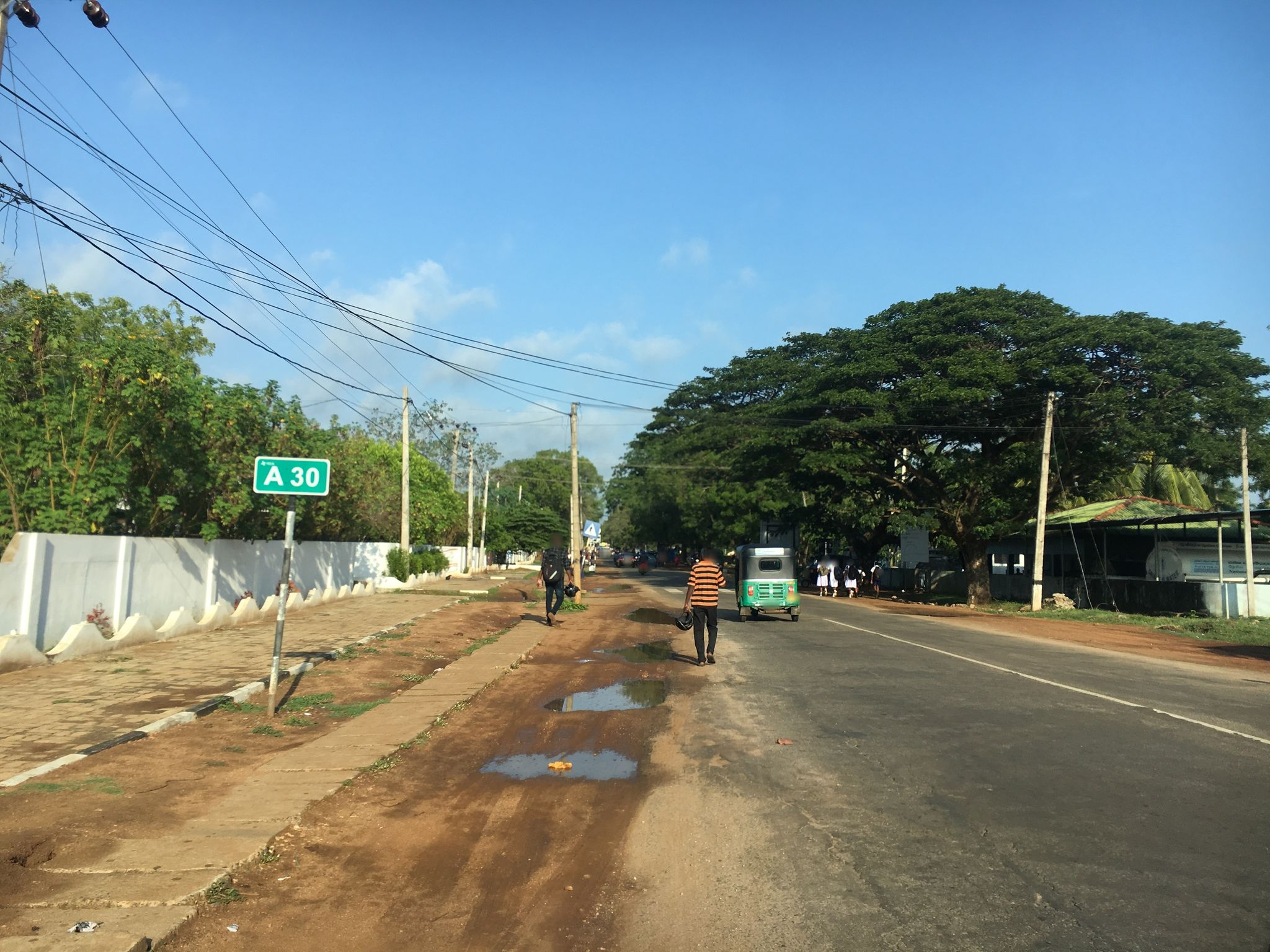
A30 road in Vavuniya

The A30 road is an A-Grade trunk road in Sri Lanka. It connects Vavuniya with Parayanalankulam, passing through Poovarasankulam and Pandisurichchan.
