= Pussellawa =

Pussellawa පුස්සැල්ලාව புசல்லாவ
- Pussellawa Town Council Original Crest 1950
- Motto: Service to the Nation
- Map of Sri Lanka showing the location of Pussellawa
- Coordinates: 7°6.32′0″N 80°38.2′0″E
- Country: Sri Lanka
- Province: Central Province
- District: Kandy District

Government
  - Type: Udapalatha Divisional Secretariat
- Elevation: 855 m (2,805 ft)
- Time zone: UTC+5:30 (Sri Lanka Standard Time Zone)
- Postal Code: 20580
- Area code: 081
- Vehicle registration: CP XX XXXX

Pussellawa Sinhala: පුස්සැල්ලාව. Tamil: புசல்லாவ, is a l town in Kandy District, Sri Lanka. It is located along the A5 road between Gampola and Nuwara Eliya.

Legend says ancient kings of Gampola Kingdom established by the great King Buvanekabahu IV. (1341–1357) when threatened by enemies used to hide among in the inaccessible terrain around Pussellawa and Kothmale. These inaccessible terrains later became the world best known Tea Plantations.

The beginning of the Hill country, Pussellawa is 16 km from Gampola on A5 Nuwara Eliya road and has an elevation of nearly 2,800 feet (850 m) that makes the climate cool and surroundings can go under the mist during late evenings. Pussellawa Rest House was a popular stop with the early travellers, who rested prior to passing through the difficult mountains at Ramboda Pass onto Nuwara Eliya. The nearest Railway station is located in Gampola.

Around the town are a number of Tea Plantations, Tea Factories, Streams, Waterfalls. Kothmale Dam, Places of worship that could be visited conveniently by the modern traveler.

== Schools in Pussellawa ==
- Holy Trinity National College
- Hindu National College
- Delta Gemunupura Maha Vidyalaya
- Saraswathy National College
- Buddhist Junior School
- Hindu Primary School

== Banks ==
- Hatton National Bank
- Bank of Ceylon
- People's Bank
- Sampath Bank
- NSB Bank
- Seylan Bank

== Public Transport ==
The public transport of the area is carried out mainly by buses and by various other local modes such as taxis, * Auto rickshaw (three wheels) and lorries. Main Bus Stop Terminal for the public buses within the town is located center of the town. The Rail transportation can be obtained via Gampola railway station, which is the nearest railway station to the town. The main public transport mode of many of estate dwellers to reach main road or the town is Three wheels. Also there are many Three wheelers available for short and long-distance travelling.

== Attractions near Pussellawa ==
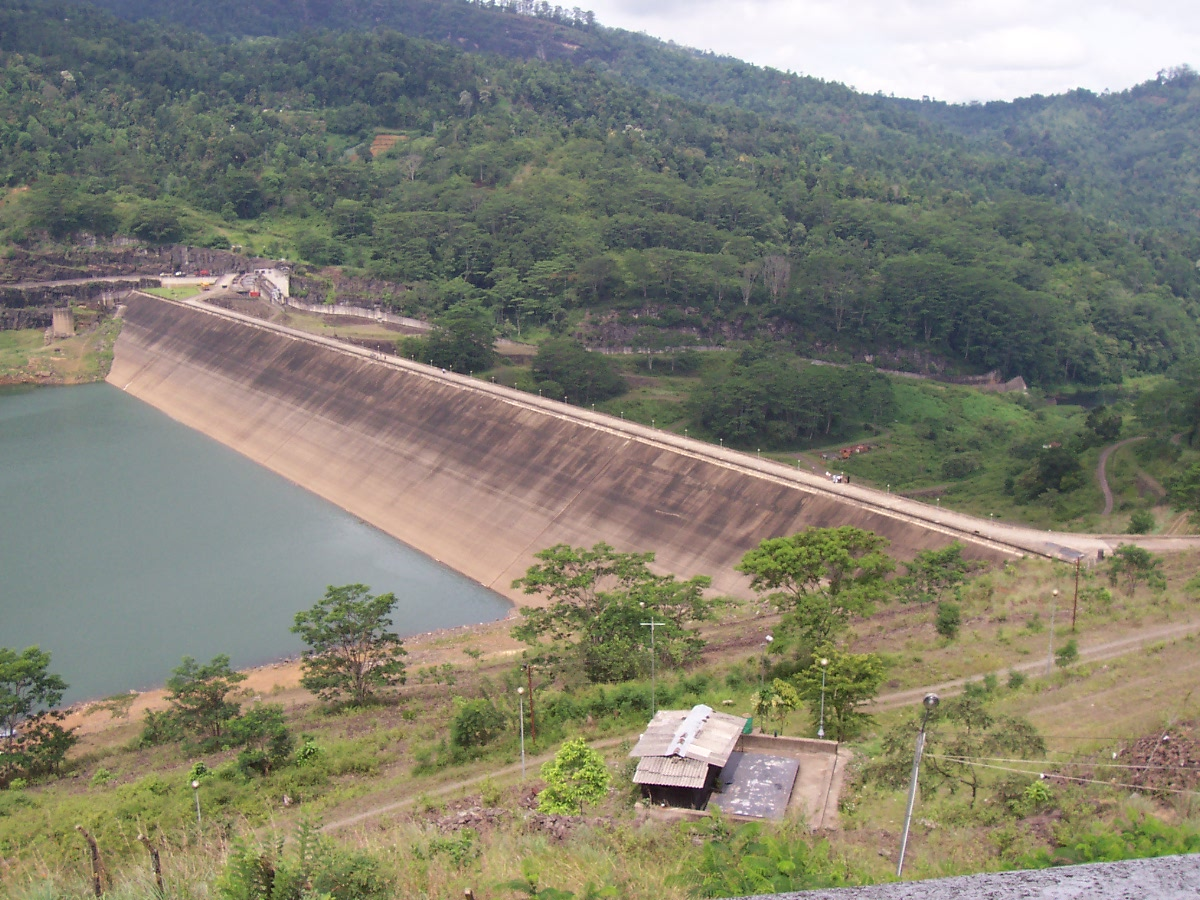
Kotmale dam is located near Pussellawa.

=== Delta Falls ===
Height: 197 feet (60 m), 60 meters Delta Falls a minor waterfall, in – Pussellawa area, near the main highway A5. This fall, rushing over in six cascades into a wide pond surrounded by rocks, is also located on a tributary of Kotmale Oya. People around the area call this waterfall “Helboda Ella”

=== Garandi Falls ===
Height: 328 feet (100 m), 100 meters

=== Ramboda Falls ===
Ramboda Falls is 109m high and is regarded as the 11th highest waterfall in Sri Lanka and 729th highest waterfall in the world. It is situated in Pussellawa area, on the A5 highway at Ramboda Pass. It formed by Panna Oya which is a tributary of Kothmale Oya. Altitude of the falls is 945m above sea level.

=== Hellebodde Falls ===
Height: 10 meters, 33 feet (10 m) The small waterfall by the main Gampola – Nuwara Eliya road at 41/7 km is 9 km from Pussellawa and is located below the Helboda Estate. The fall rushing over the rock ledge originating from the forests upstream carries a fair amount of water even during the dry season. The location with parking is convenient for bathing and the clean, cool water is popular among the travelers.

=== Pundalu Oya Falls ===
Height: 328 feet (100 m), 100 meters The magnificent fall consists of three sectors. In the first sector water falls over the broad rock-face and continues to flow over a flat terrain. The river traverses across this flat sector and continues below the bridge, into the valley below to join Kotmale Oya. The waterfall is located 2 km to the east of Pundalu Oya on the road to Dansit Estate in the midst of tea plantations.

== Tea estates around Pussellawa ==
Sri Lanka is one of the world's largest exporters of tea. Since the introduction of tea to Sri Lanka in mid 19th century Pussellawa has been in the mids of the tea industry. For many miles prior to reaching Pussellawa Town from either direction you will find acres and acres of tea plantations, in fact, nothing but tea estates. There are many factories open for visitor's which also have tea sales outlets.

Melfort Estate This area is where the ground was cleared for the very first plantations which were in coffee in about 1826. The estate is at the lower end of the Pussellawa valley on the road to Nuwara Eliya. This area is an endless tea carpet, following every dip and mound in the ground broken only by the shade trees, bungalows, factory and workers cottages. A green tea factory was established in 1918.

Rothschild Tea Estate The 2000-acre Rothschild estate at Pussellawa was well known for its completeness and efficiency and was held up as a model for others to recapitulate. Rothschild tea was the standard for quality in Mincing Lane for over twenty-five years. With the start made at Pussellawa (History of Ceylon Tea).

Rothschild Tea estate wins top entrepreneur award in Central Province (Sunday December 19, 2010) Rothschild Tea Estate at Pussellawa recently received the award for the best large-scale entrepreneur in the Central Province at a ceremony organized by the Ministry of Industries and the Department of Industrial Development and Enterprise Promotion, to recognize and reward best performing entrepreneurs in the province in overall business excellence. Rothschild is the first tea estate in the world to receive the Global Gap certificate.

Kaloogala Estate

Sogama Estate

Sanquhar Estate Estate comprises, 605 are under cultivation, 475 being planted with tea and 130 with rubber.

New Peacock Estate

Delta Estate a company owned by "Pussellawa" plantation ltd.

Beaumont Estate

== Places of Worship ==
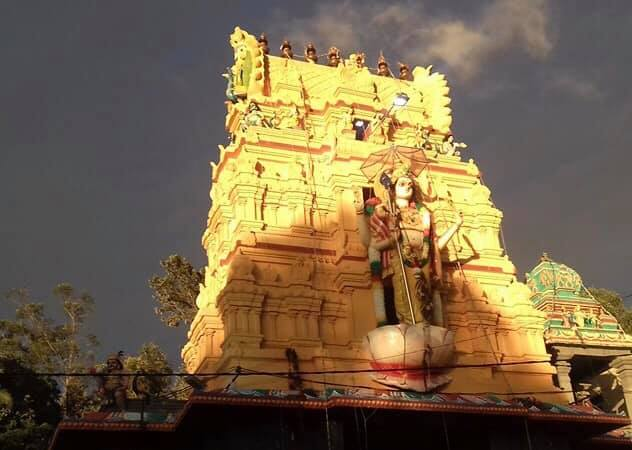
கதிரேசன் கோயில் புஸ்ஸல்லாவ

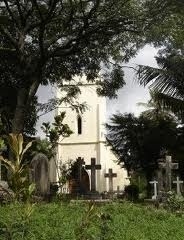
Holy Trinity Anglican Church

Sri Kathiresan Kovil Murugan Temple was built in around 1885. This temple was reconstructed and Kumbhabhishekham was held in March 2016. The presiding deity is Lord Murugan in the form of the holy 'Vel' in the Sanctum.

Sri Bakta Hanuman Temple Ramboda Shri Bhakta Hanuman Temple was built by the Chinmaya Mission of Sri Lanka. The 16 foot idol of Shri Hanuman is made of black granite. The temple itself is situated about 500m from the main road on a hill having a commanding view of the surrounding area. Legend has it that king Ravana has hid Sita in this area at one time and Hanuman come to this area in search of Sita.

Holy Trinity Church This Church is a small whitewashed church on a wooded hillock overlooking Pussellawa. The church was built in 1859 by Europeans who were here as tea planters. The church's sesquicentennial 150 year anniversary was celebrated in 2009. There are brass memorials to a number of plantation owners and superintendents. All worship is conducted in Sinhala and Tamil languages. In the shadow of Holy Trinity is the Holy Trinity Pre-School. Established in 1976, the pre-school is attended by over 100 children of the four religious faiths in Sri Lanka. The Daughter church of the Holy Trinity is Saint Hilda's Church situated in Delta Estate, built in 1902.

St. Benedicts Church

Sri Mathindaramaya Buddhist Temple

Sri Bodirajaramaya Buddhist Temple

Jummah Masjid
