= Katugastota =

Katugastota කටුගස්තොට கடுகஸ்தொட
- Suburb
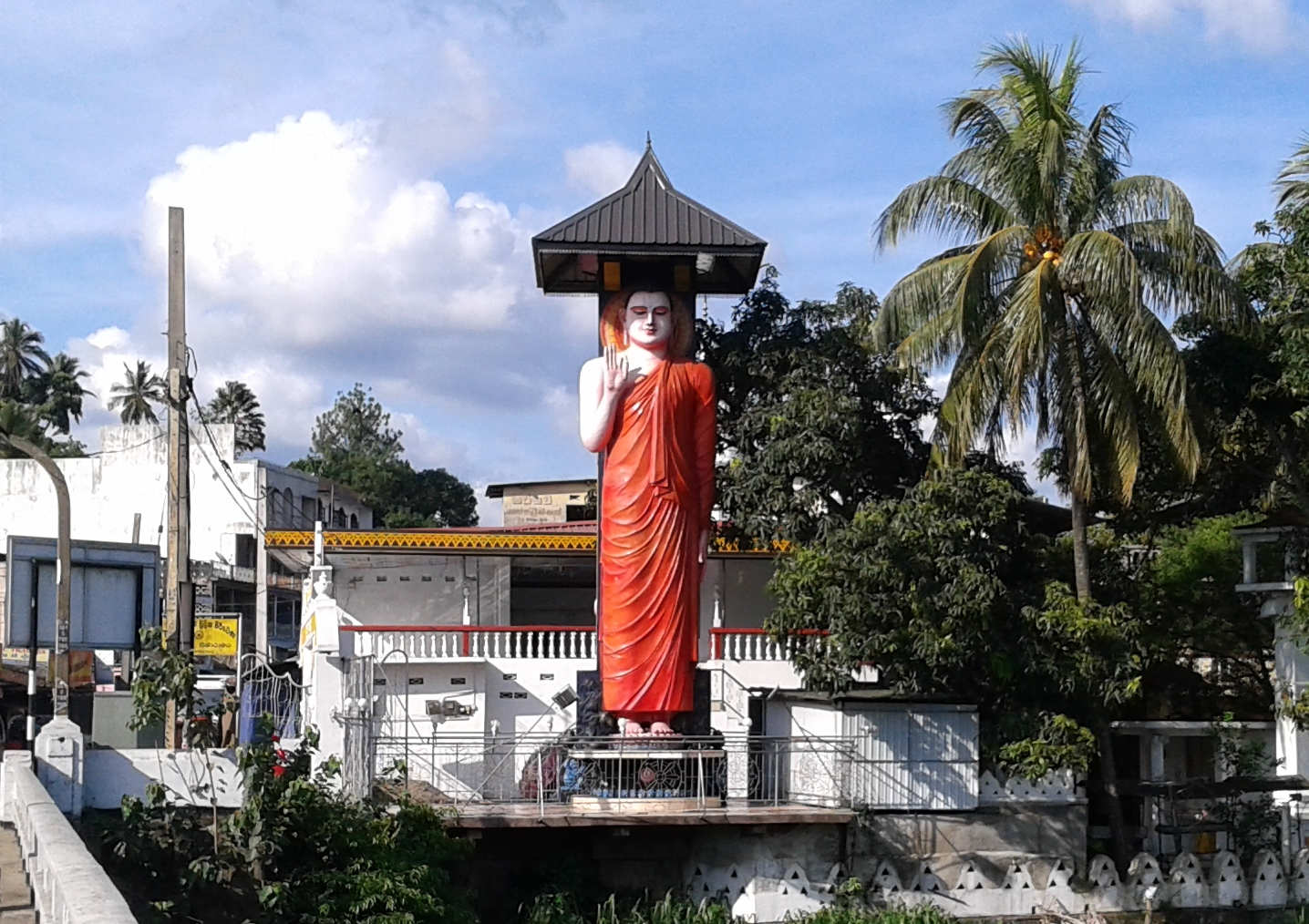
- Three Sinhala Seemaramaya Katugastota, The division point of Thun Sinhale.

- Location within Sri Lanka
- Coordinates: 7°19′10.56″N 80°37′10.55″E
- Country: Sri Lanka
- Province: Central Province
- District: Kandy District
- Elevation: 453 m (1,486 ft)
- Time zone: UTC+5:30 (Sri Lanka Standard Time)

Katugastota (Sinhala: කටුගස්තොට, Tamil: கடுகஸ்தொட) is a suburb of the city of Kandy in Kandy District, Central Province of Sri Lanka. It is located along the Kandy-Jaffna A9 highway approximately 4 km (2.5 mi) from the city center of Kandy. Katugastota is one of the three main entry points to the city of Kandy. Two major Highways (A9 and A10) meet at the center of the city which makes Katugastota one of the busiest suburbs in Kandy district.

== Etymology ==
The Sinhalese name කටු-ගස්-තොට (Katu-gas-tota) literally means "Port with thorn trees". Another belief is that the name is derived from the Sinhalese name කඩු-ගත්-තොට which means "port with sword-bearers".

== History ==
According to the histories, Sri Lanka has been divided into three parts well known as Ruhunu(රුහුණු), Maya(මායා) and Pihiti(පිහිටි), with each of them divided into kingdoms, provinces and districts as per the 'Tun-Sinhale proposal' and Katugastota was the center point of Sri Lanka. The 'Three Sinhala Seemaramaya', together with the '18 Riyan statue of Lord Buddha' still remain to show the division point.

The original Katugastota Bridge, which had been constructed nearly 100 years previously by the British government, was replaced in 2009 by a new four lane bridge, alongside improvements to the major A9 and A10 roads.

== Health care ==
=== Hospitals ===
Katugastota has two hospitals, the Katugastota Hospital and the Kandy Private Hospital (KPH). KPH is located approximately 2.5 km (1.6 mi) from the Katugastota towards the Kandy city centre. It provides both out patient, specialist channeling services and residential treatment facilities.

== Investment and financial ==
=== Government banks ===
The Peoples Bank is located in the Kandy-Kurunegala high way. The Bank of Ceylon Katugastota branch is located in the Madawala Road. The Sampath Bank, Commercial Bank, Seylan Bank and DFCC bank are the private banks in Katugastota. The Sampath bank is located in Madawala road approximately 100 m from the Bank of Ceylon bank. The DFCC Bank is located right before the DFCC bank and the Seylan bank is located in Kandy-Kurunegala highway approximately 200 m from the Katugastota Bridge before St. Anthony's Girls College.

== Schools ==
St. Anthony's College is situated in the center of Katugasthota. Local schools include Sri Rahula college, St. Anthony's Girls School, Zahira college, Mahaweli school, Wesswood International.

== Climate ==
Katugastota has a tropical rainforest climate (Köppen: Af) characterized by warm temperatures and a significant amount of rainfall. Katugastota has a wet season from October to December.

Climate data for Katugastota, elevation 477 m (1,565 ft), (1991–2020)
Month	Jan	Feb	Mar	Apr	May	Jun	Jul	Aug	Sep	Oct	Nov	Dec	Year
Record high °C (°F)	32.5 (90.5)	35.0 (95.0)	37.6 (99.7)	36.4 (97.5)	34.9 (94.8)	32.8 (91.0)	32.8 (91.0)	31.7 (89.1)	33.1 (91.6)	33.2 (91.8)	33.1 (91.6)	32.0 (89.6)	37.6 (99.7)
Mean daily maximum °C (°F)	28.6 (83.5)	30.2 (86.4)	32.0 (89.6)	31.4 (88.5)	30.2 (86.4)	28.6 (83.5)	28.2 (82.8)	28.5 (83.3)	28.9 (84.0)	28.9 (84.0)	28.8 (83.8)	28.0 (82.4)	29.4 (84.9)
Daily mean °C (°F)	23.7 (74.7)	24.5 (76.1)	26.0 (78.8)	26.4 (79.5)	26.0 (78.8)	25.2 (77.4)	25.0 (77.0)	24.9 (76.8)	24.8 (76.6)	24.8 (76.6)	24.7 (76.5)	23.9 (75.0)	25.0 (77.0)
Mean daily minimum °C (°F)	18.8 (65.8)	18.7 (65.7)	19.9 (67.8)	21.4 (70.5)	21.8 (71.2)	21.9 (71.4)	21.8 (71.2)	21.3 (70.3)	20.8 (69.4)	20.7 (69.3)	20.5 (68.9)	19.8 (67.6)	20.6 (69.1)
Record low °C (°F)	11.4 (52.5)	10.6 (51.1)	10.7 (51.3)	16.1 (61.0)	17.8 (64.0)	16.9 (62.4)	16.7 (62.1)	17.1 (62.8)	16.8 (62.2)	15.9 (60.6)	14.4 (57.9)	13.3 (55.9)	10.6 (51.1)
Average precipitation mm (inches)	103.2 (4.06)	78.1 (3.07)	97.6 (3.84)	189.1 (7.44)	141.2 (5.56)	124.5 (4.90)	108.0 (4.25)	95.4 (3.76)	123.5 (4.86)	303.3 (11.94)	268.9 (10.59)	203.6 (8.02)	1,836.3 (72.30)
Average precipitation days (≥ 1.0 mm)	7.6	6.1	6.8	13.2	10.4	13.6	12.5	11.4	12.4	18.1	16.5	12.7	141.3
Source: NOAA

== See also ==
- List of towns in Central Province, Sri Lanka
