= A10 road (Sri Lanka) =

Road in Sri Lanka

Coordinates: 7.621824°N 80.244935°E

The A10 road is an A-Grade trunk road in Sri Lanka. It connects Katugastota with Puttalam.

The A10 passes through Galagedara, Mawathagama, Kurunegala, Wariyapola, Padeniya, Nikavaratiya, Anamaduwa, and Kalladi to reach Puttalam.
