= A33 road (Sri Lanka) =

Road in Sri Lanka

Coordinates: 7.095372°N 79.905429°E

The A 33 road is an A-Grade trunk road in Sri Lanka. It connects Ja Ela,Yakkala with Gampaha.

The A 33 passes through Gampaha to reach Yakkala.
