= A11 road (Sri Lanka) =

Road in Sri Lanka

Coordinates: 7.938845°N 81.221291°E

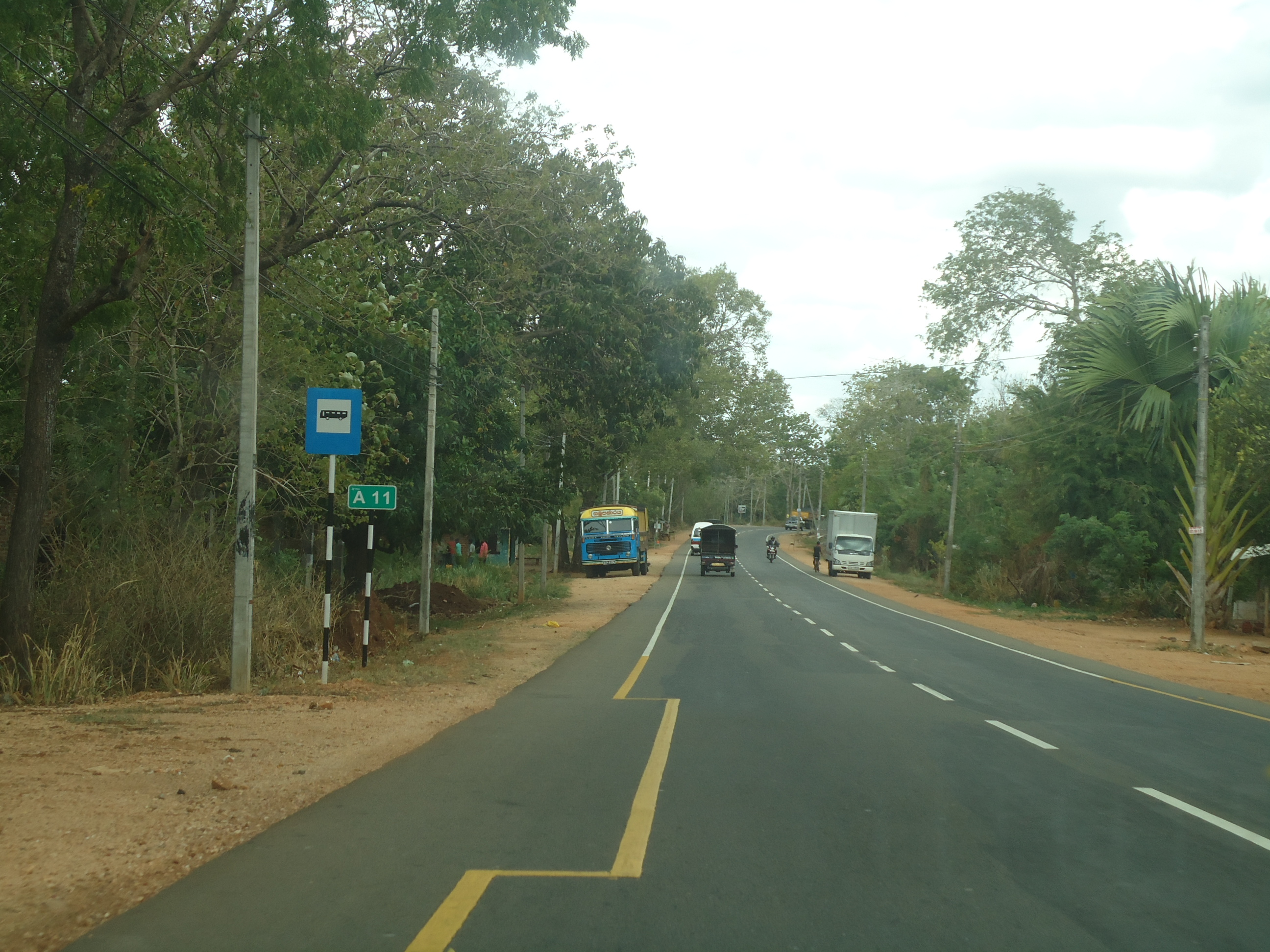
The A11 road

The A11 road is an A-Grade trunk road in Sri Lanka. It connects the Maradankadawala with Tirikkondiadimadu.

The A11 passes through Ganewalpola, Habarana, Moragaswewa, Minneriya, Polannaruwa, Kaduruwela, Manampitiya, Welikanda, Punani and Vakaneri to reach Tirikkondiadimadu.
