= A24 road (Sri Lanka) =

Coordinates: 6.012439°N 80.509624°E

The A24 road is an A-Grade trunk road in Sri Lanka that connects Matara with Akuressa. The A24 passes through Thelijavila to reach Akuressa.
