= A19 highway (Sri Lanka) =

Road in Sri Lanka

Coordinates: 7.283551°N 80.321989°E

The A19 road is an A-Grade trunk road in Sri Lanka. It connects Polgahawela with Kegalle.
