= Ambanpola =

Town in Sri Lanka

Ambanpola අබන්පොල
- Town
- Location within Sri Lanka
- Coordinates: 7°55′01″N 80°14′31″E
- Country: Sri Lanka
- District: Kurunegala
- Time zone: UTC+5:30 (SLST)
- Postal code: 60650
- Area code: 037

Ambanpola (Sinhala: අඹන්පොල) is a town in Kurunegala District in Sri Lanka. Ambanpola is located between Maho and Galgamuwa towns. It is a major railway station on the Northern Line. There are several public places like temples and schools are in this town. When traveling from Kurunegala to Anuradhapura via Padeniya this town can be found from 57 km away from Kurunegala town when travelling along "Anuradhapura through Alla" (route number is 57). Famous reservoirs of beautiful Abakolawewa, Athaeagalla and inginimitiya are located around Ambanpola.

A well-known public Ayurvedic hospital is located on Danikithawa Road in Ambanpola.
