= A21 road (Sri Lanka) =

Road in Sri Lanka

Coordinates: 7.112817°N 80.307484°E

The A21 road is an A-Grade trunk road in Sri Lanka. It connects Kegalle with Karawanella via Bulathkohupitiya.

The A21 passes through Moronthota, Bulathkohupitiya and Ruwanwella to reach Karawanella.
