= Kachchai =

Kachchai கச்சாய் කච්චය
- Village
- Location within Northern Province
- Coordinates: 9°39′0″N 80°12′0″E
- Country: Sri Lanka
- Province: Northern
- District: Jaffna
- DS Division: Thenmaradchi

Kachchai (Tamil: கச்சாய்) is a Sri Lankan village located in Thenmarachchi region, 4 km (2.5 mi) east of Chavakachcheri.
