= A35 road (Sri Lanka) =

Road in Sri Lanka

Coordinates: 9.340926°N 80.640163°E

The A 35 road is an A-Grade trunk road in Sri Lanka. It connects Paranthan with Mullaitivu, both in Northern Province, via Kachchai.

The A 35 passes through Velikkandal, Theravikulam and Puthukkudiyiruppu to reach Mullaitivu.
