= A27 road (Sri Lanka) =

Road in Sri Lanka

Coordinates: 7.525873°N 81.549969°E

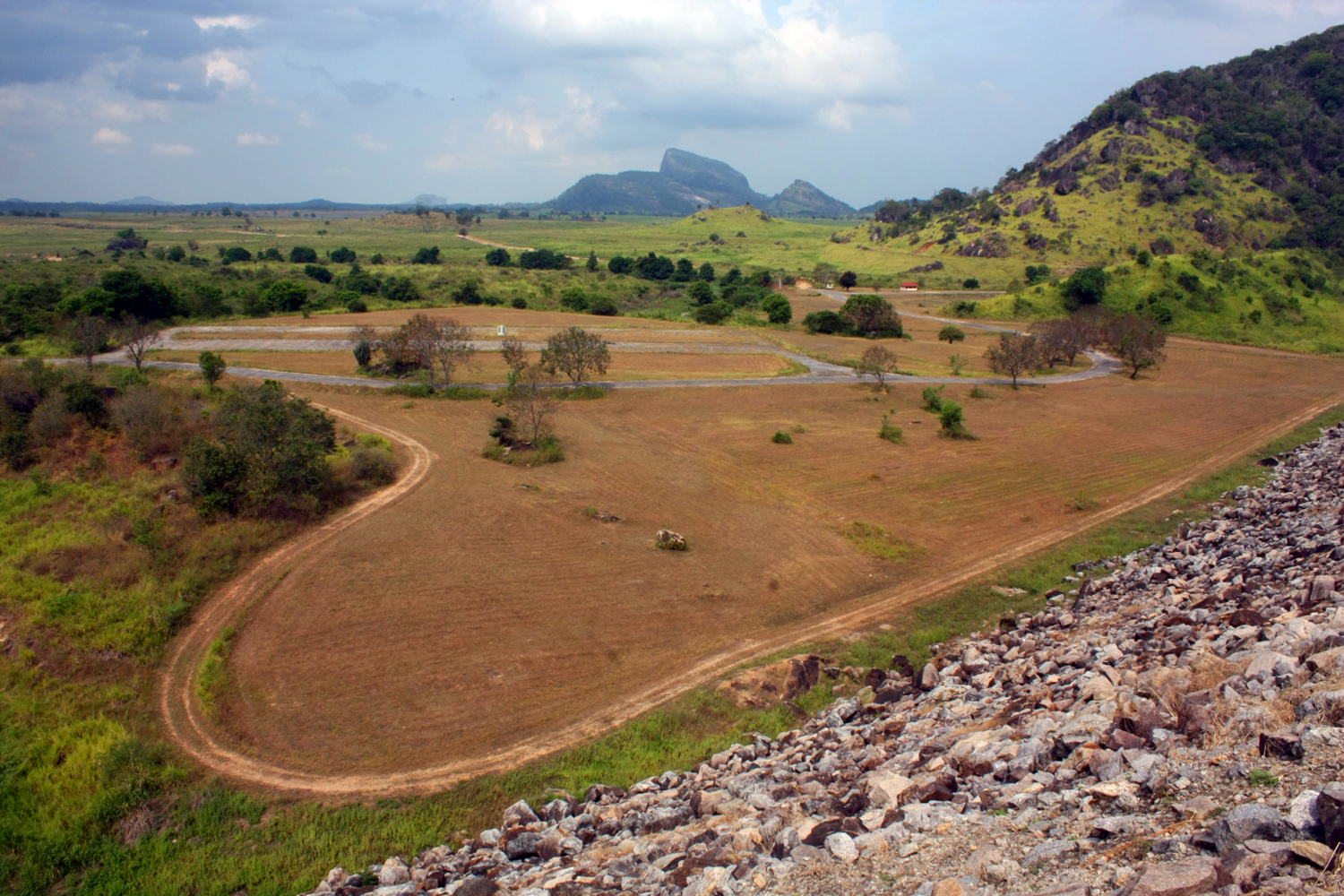
Maha Oya

The A27 road is an A-Grade trunk road in Sri Lanka. It connects Ampara with Mahaoya via Uhana.

The A27 passes through Uhana, Bakkiella, Nuwaragalatenna and Aranthalawa to reach Maha Oya.
