= A12 road (Sri Lanka) =

Road in Sri Lanka

Coordinates: 8.030605°N 79.854689°E

The A12 road is an A-Grade trunk road in Sri Lanka. It connects Puttalam with Trincomallee.

The A12 passes through Karuwalagaswewa, Palugassegama, Kala Oya, Nochchiyagama, Maha Bulankulama, Anuradhapura, Mihintale, Tammanewa, Kahatagasdigiliya, Morakewa, Horowapotana, Morawewa (Muthalikulam), Pankulam, and Kanniya to reach Trincomallee.
