= A34 road (Sri Lanka) =

Road in Sri Lanka

Coordinates: 9.154384°N 80.623598°E

The A34 road is an A-Grade trunk road in Sri Lanka. It connects Mankulam with Mullaitivu.

The A34 passes through Karupaddamurippu, Oddusuddan and Mulliyawalai to reach Mullaitivu.
