= A13 road (Sri Lanka) =

Road in Sri Lanka

Coordinates: 8.298959°N 80.441342°E

The A13 road is an A-Grade trunk road in Sri Lanka. It connects the Galkulama with Anuradhapura.
