= A23 road (Sri Lanka) =

Road in Sri Lanka

Coordinates: 6.814537°N 81.082809°E

The A23 road is an A-Grade trunk road in Sri Lanka. It connects Wellawaya with Kumbalwela via Ella.
