= Navatkuli =

Navatkuli நாவற்குழி නාවක්කුලිය
- Town
- Location within Northern Province
- Coordinates: 9°39′0″N 80°05′0″E
- Country: Sri Lanka
- Province: Northern
- District: Jaffna
- DS Division: Thenmarachchi

Navatkuli (Tamil: நாவற்குழி, romanized: Nāvaṟkuḻi) is a town in Jaffna District, Northern Province, Sri Lanka. It is located about 6.5 km from Jaffna.

Navatkuli consists of three grama niladhari divisions in the Thenmaradchi Divisional Secretariat: Navatkuli West, Navatkuli East, and Kaithady Navatkuli.

== Demographics ==
In 2007, the population of Navatkuli West was 1,362 (652 male & 710 female; 873 adults and 489 children); the population of Navatkuli East was 1,060 (484 male & 576 female; 705 adults and 355 children), and the population of Kaithady Navatkuli was 810 (398 male & 412 female; 529 adults and 281 children). The entire population of Navatkuli East and Kaithady Navatkuli, as well as all but 216 people in Navatkuli West, was displaced at the time due to the Sri Lankan Civil War.
