= A26 highway (Sri Lanka) =

Road in Sri Lanka

Coordinates: 7.296702°N 80.844934°E

The A26 highway is an A-Grade trunk road in Sri Lanka. It connects Kandy with Padiyathalawa via Mahiyangana.

The A26 passes through Digana, Teldeniya, Medamahanuwara, Hunnasgiriya, Udadumbara, Mahiyangana and Belilgalla to reach Padiyathalawa.

It is well known for its 18 consecutive hairpin turns. This road is now expanding minimizing the bends by the national highway sector project of the Road Development Authority of Sri Lanka.
