= A20 road (Sri Lanka) =

Road in Sri Lanka

Coordinates: 8.414507°N 80.461078°E

The A20 road is an A-Grade trunk road in Sri Lanka. It connects Anuradhapura with Rambewa.
