= Lunugala =

Town in Uva Province, Sri Lanka

Lunugala ලුණුගල லுணுகலை
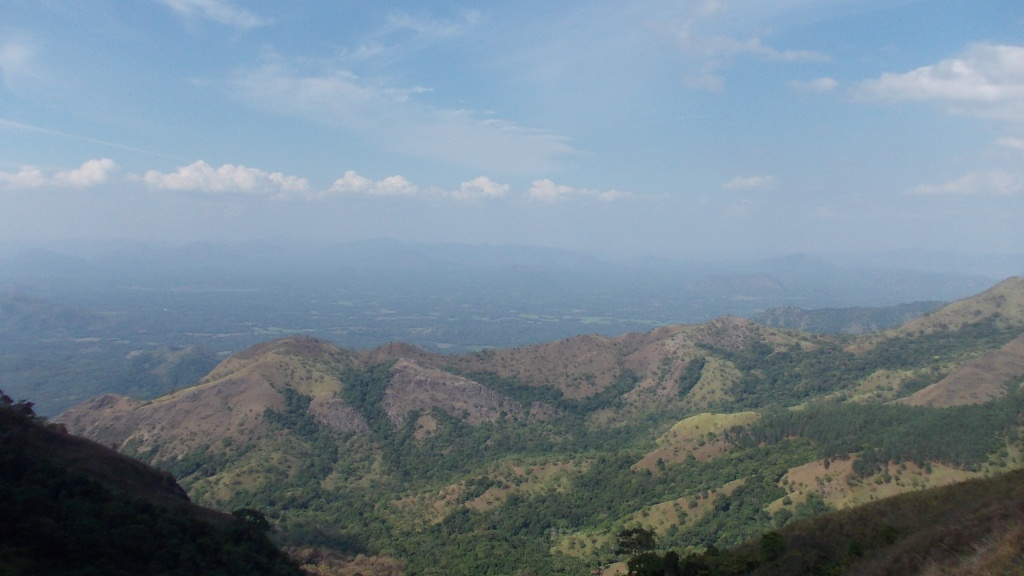
- The Madolsima region of Lunugala
- Interactive map of Lunugala
- Coordinates: 7°2′0″N 81°12′0″E
- Country: Sri Lanka
- Province: Uva
- District: Badulla

Government
  - Pradeshiya Saba: Lunugala Pradeshiya Sabava
  - Pradesiya Sabapathi: no

Population
  - Total: 31,381[Census of population Housing SL2,012]
- Time zone: UTC+05:30 (Sri Lanka Standard Time Zone)
- Social Network Profile,

Lunugala is a town in the Sri Lankan province of Uva. There are 28 Grama Niladhari Divisions in the Lunugala Divisional Secretariat Division

The town is placed in middle of a mountain range. It was called "Pattipola" (Sinhala: පට්ටිපොල) in the past. Its main agricultural product is tea. There are many beautiful tea estates in Lunugala as Adawatta Estate, Park Estate, Hopton Estate, Showlands Estate and Madolsima Plantation. Additionally people cultivate pepper, cinnamon and cacao.

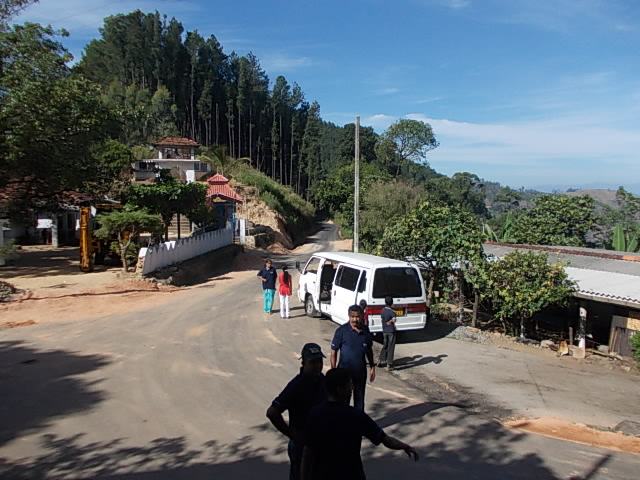
Madolsima Village

== Society & Population Distribution ==
Basically the society of lunugala consists of three major types—Sinhala, Tamil and Muslims. These people live peacefully together. In some places there are cross marriages as Tamil-Muslims, Muslim-Sinhala and Tamil-Sinhala.

Religion in Lunugala DS Division (2012)
1. Buddhist (41.4%)
2. Hindu (48.7%)
3. Muslim (3.99%)
4. Roman Catholic (4.76%)
5. Other Christian (1.19%)
6. Other (0.00%)

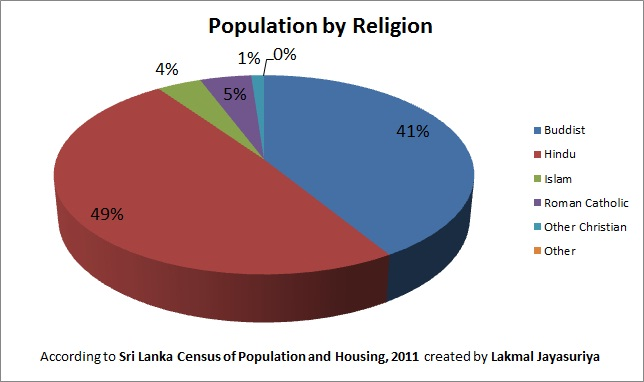
Lunugala population by religion According to Census of Population Housing SL,2011

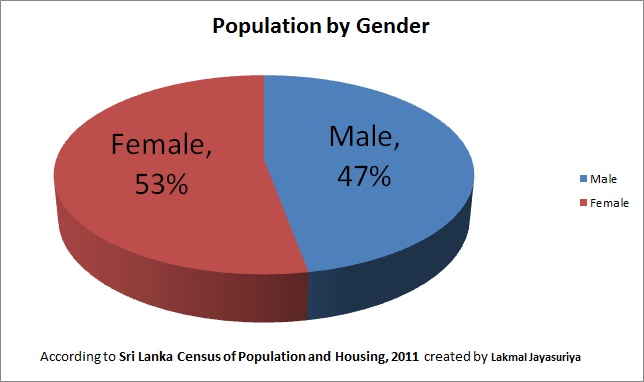
Lunugala population by gender, According to Census of Population Housing SL,2011

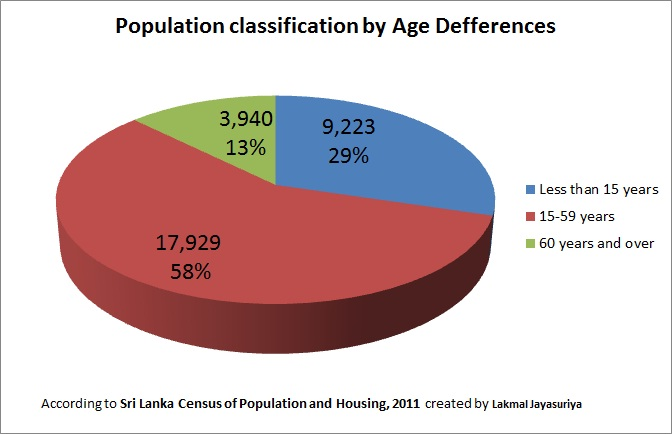
Lunugala population classification by Age differences, According to Census of population Housing SL,2011

== Schools ==
- Lunugala Central College
- Sri Ramakrishna College
- Yapamma Sri Dhammananda Vidyalaya
- Kalai Mahal Tamil Maha Vidyalayam
- Muslim School
- Jayabima Primary school

== Religious places ==
- Lunugala Sri Lonagiri Purana Rajamaha Viharaya
- Yapamma Sri Ramya Vijayarama Viharaya
- Lunugala Sri Kadireshan Kovil
- Lunugala Jumma Mosque
- Lunugala Catholic Church

== Hospitals ==
- Lunugala Hospital
- Hopton Hospital
- Adawatta Dispensary

== Public banks ==
- Bank of Ceylon
- Peoples Bank
- Regional Development Bank

== Gallery ==
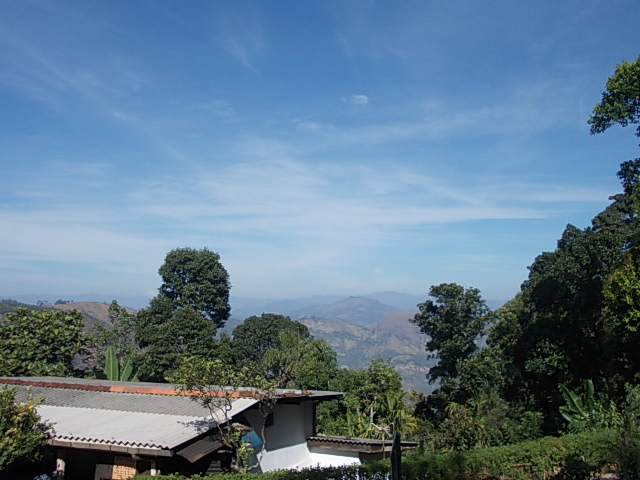
Beauty of Lunugala 1

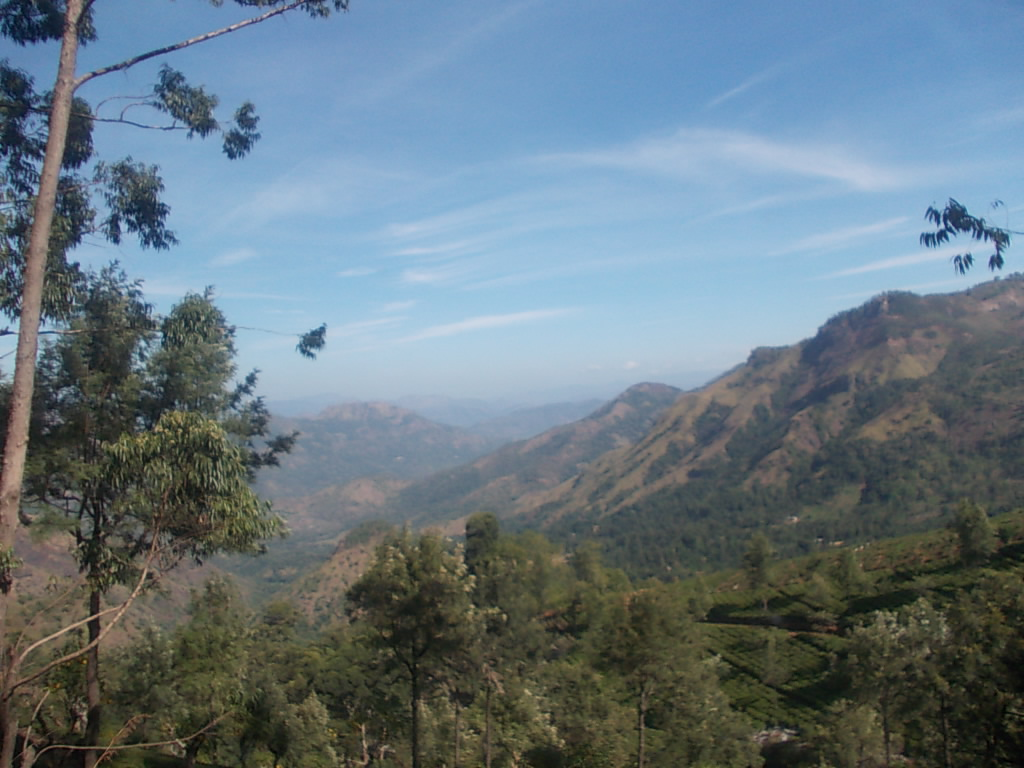
Beauty of Lunugala 2

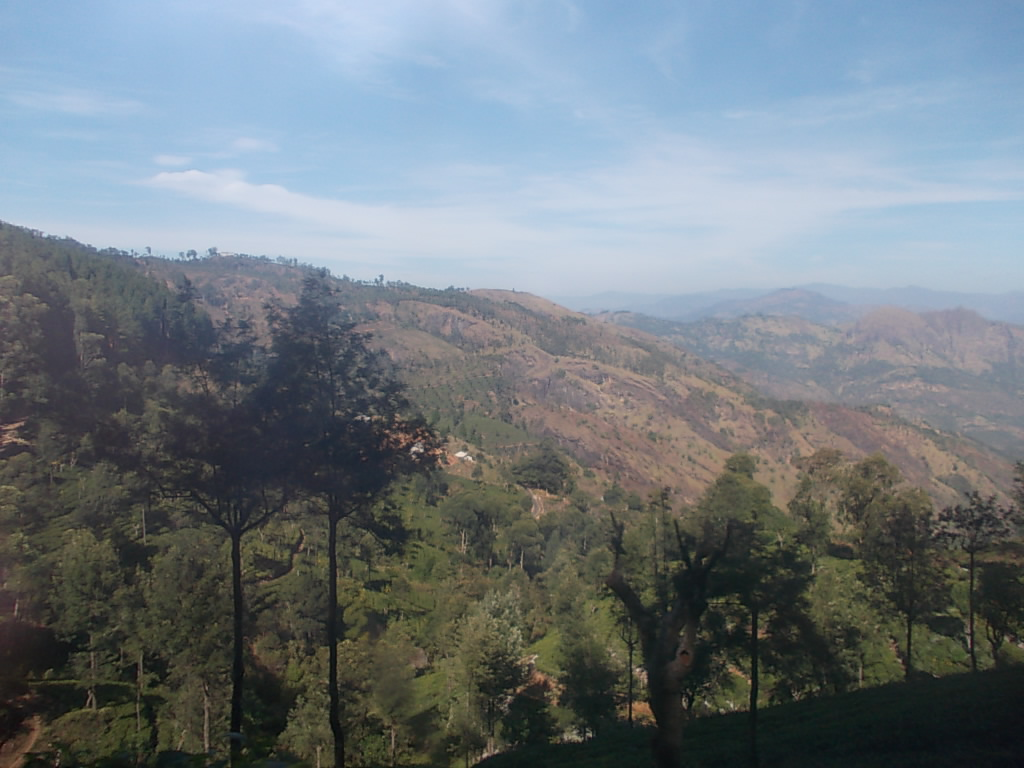
Beauty of Lunugala 3

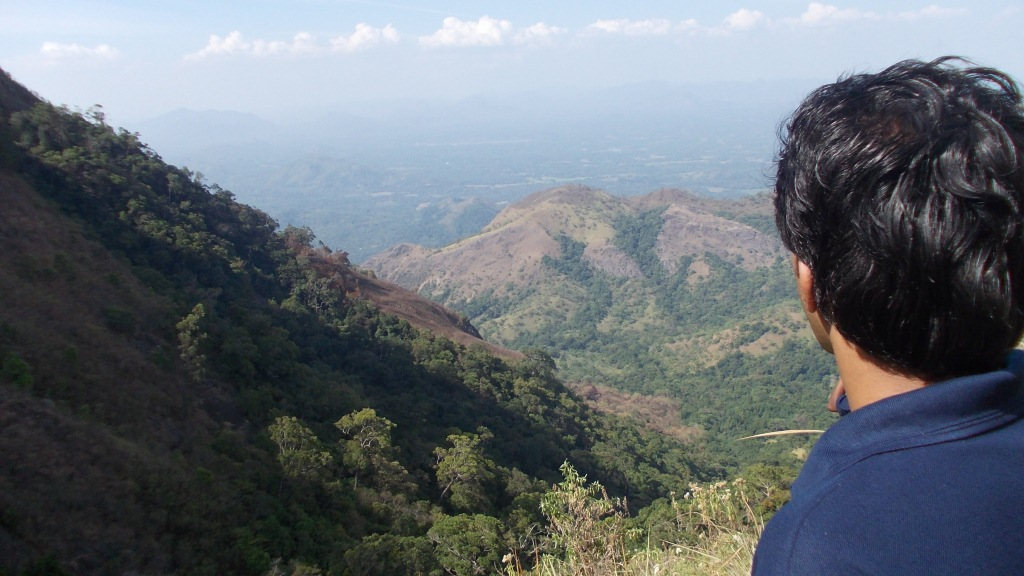
Beauty of Lunugala 4

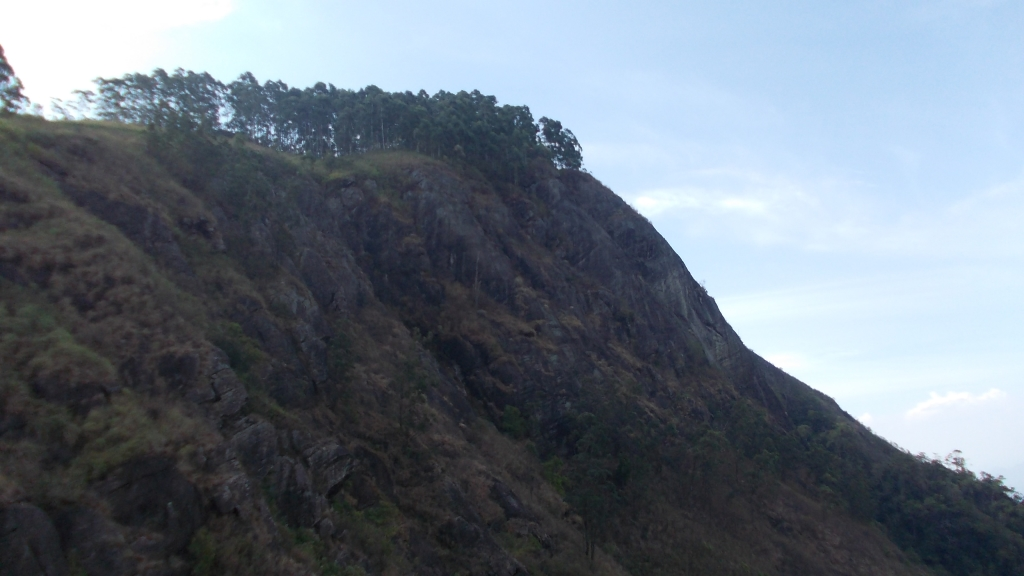
Beauty of Lunugala 5
