= A0 road (Sri Lanka) =

Road in Sri Lanka

Coordinates: 6.911899°N 79.850736°E

The A0 is an A-Grade road in Sri Lanka. It connects Kollupitiya and Sri Jayawardenepura, the nation's capital.

The highway passes through Rajagiriya.
