= A25 road (Sri Lanka) =

Road in Sri Lanka

Coordinates: 7.158768°N 81.598829°E

The A25 road is an A-Grade trunk road in Sri Lanka. It connects the Siyabalanduwa with Ampara via Damana.

The A25 passes through Pallewela, Wadinagala, and Damana to reach Ampara.
