= A22 road (Sri Lanka) =

Road in Sri Lanka

Coordinates: 6.89899°N 81.28192°E

The A22 road is an A-Grade trunk road in Sri Lanka. It connects Passara with Monaragala.

The A22 passes through Badalkumbura to reach Monaragala.
