= A31 road (Sri Lanka) =

Road in Sri Lanka

Coordinates: 7.350842°N 81.77269°E

The A31 road is an A-Grade trunk road in Sri Lanka. It connects Ampara with Karaitivu.

The A31 passes through Sammanthurai to reach Karaitivu.
