= A18 road (Sri Lanka) =

Road in Sri Lanka

Coordinates: 6.462437°N 80.735865°E

The A18 road is an A-Grade trunk road in Sri Lanka. It connects Nonagama with Pelmadulla.

The A18 passes through Siyambalagoda, Padalangala, Thunkama, Embilipitiya, Timbolketiya, Sankhapala, Pallebedda, Godakawela, Madampe and Kahawatta to reach Pelmadulla.
