= Dodangoda =

Dodangoda is a surname. It may refer to:

- Amarasiri Dodangoda (1941–2009), Sri Lankan politician and minister
- Isuru Dodangoda, Sri Lankan politician, former provincial councillor and Member of Parliament

== See also ==
- Dodangoda Divisional Secretariat, a Divisional Secretariat of Kalutara District, of Western Province, Sri Lanka
