= A16 road (Sri Lanka) =

Road in Sri Lanka

Coordinates: 6.869467°N 81.02757°E

The A16 road is an A-Grade trunk road in Sri Lanka. It connects Beragala with Hali Ela.

The A16 passes through Bandarawela and Demodara to reach Hali Ela.
