= Nonagama =

Coordinates: 6°07′N 81°00′E

Nonagama is a small town situated Ambalantota in Hambantota District in Sri Lanka. The town is known as the junction which connects the A2 and A18 roads together. Nonagama's name is derived from Gajaman Nona. The town is near the entrance to Ussangoda Beach Ambalantota from Nonagama Junction, called Walipatanwila Junction.

== History ==
Between 1802 and 1806 Sir John D'Oyly was the Government Agent and Fiscal Collector in District Matara and Hambantota. Gajaman Nona was left almost destitute by the death of her husband, and she could not get a proper job. Since Gajaman Nona had several children to take care of, she asked John D'Oyly, the Government Agent, for some kind of assistance. Kind-hearted Sir John D'Oyly granted Nindagama so that she could provide for her family. Presently, this statue of her stands at Ambalantota, Nonagama Junction (name derived from Gajaman Nona).

== Sources ==
- This inscrutable Englishman: Sir John D'Oyly, Baronet, 1774-1824 page 4,87, 249 ISBN 0-304-70095-9, ISBN 978-0-304-70095-0
- The Gajaman story: Gajaman puvatha By Dayānanda Guṇavardhana page 11,41 : ISBN 955-95409-0-4, ISBN 978-955-95409-0-8
