= A29 road (Sri Lanka) =

Road in Sri Lanka

Coordinates: 8.641956°N 80.670552°E

The A29 road is an A-Grade trunk road in Sri Lanka. It connects Horowapothana with Vavuniya.

The A29 passes through Kebettigollawa and Madukanda to reach Vavuniya.
