= Yakkala =

- village
- Location within Sri Lanka
- Coordinates: 7.085955°N 80.03333°E
- Country: Sri Lanka
- Province: Western Province
- District: Gampaha District
- Elevation: 40 m (130 ft)
- Time zone: UTC+5:30
- Area code: 033

Yakkala is a village located between Nittambuwa and Kadawatha on the A1 Highway (Colombo-Kandy Road). It forms part of Gampaha Municipal Council and located in the Gampaha District, Western Province. It is located 30 km (19 mi) north-east from Colombo, 4.5 km (3 mi) east of Gampaha and 13 km (8 mi) north-west of Radawana.

Yakkala is famous for the long-standing Ayurveda medicine family of Wickramaarachchi. Wickramaarachchi Ayurveda Institute of University of Kelaniya is also situated in Yakkala.

Main attractions around Yakkala include ancient Buddhist cave temples of Warana, Pilikuththuwa, Uruwala and Maligathenna which is also called Maligatenna Aranya.

== Education ==
- Sri Chandrajothi M.V. Yakkala
- Anura M.V. Yakkala
