= A7 road (Sri Lanka) =

Road in Sri Lanka

Coordinates: 7.001401°N 80.360956°E

The A 7 road is an A-Grade trunk road in Sri Lanka. It connects Avissawella with Nuwara Eliya.

The A 7 passes through Karawanella, Yatiyanthota, Kitulgala, Ginigathena, Hatton, Talawakele, and Nanuoya to reach Lakmini Ranasigha
