= A8 road (Sri Lanka) =

Road in Sri Lanka

Coordinates: 6.711941°N 80.347374°E

The A8 road is an A-Grade trunk road in Sri Lanka. It connects Panadura with Ratnapura, also passing through Bandaragama, Horana, Ingiriya and Kiriella. It is 68 km (42 mi) in length.
