= Wellawaya =

Wellawaya වැල්ලවාය வெல்லவாயா
- Town
- Location in Sri Lanka
- Coordinates: 6°44′0″N 81°6′0″E
- Country: Sri Lanka
- Province: Uva Province
- District: Monaragala District

Population (2012)
  - Total: 60,060
- Time zone: UTC+5:30 (Sri Lanka Standard Time)

Wellawaya (Sinhala: වැල්ලවාය, romanized: Vællavāya; Tamil: வெல்லவாய, romanized: Vellavāyā) is a town located in Monaragala District, Uva Province of Sri Lanka.

== History ==
On 25 August 1630 a major battle took place near Wellawaya between Portuguese forces and the Sinhalese under the command of King Rajasinghe II, which resulted in a complete rout of the Portuguese army.

Wellawaya is where the first armed attack occurred, on 5 April 1971, by the communist Janatha Vimukthi Peramuna (JVP) against the Government of Ceylon, under Prime Minister Sirimavo Bandaranaike.

Religion in Wellawaya DS Division (2012)

Buddhists 58,180-96.87%, Islam 1,088-1.81%, Hindu 413–0.69%, Roman Catholic 189–0.31%, Other Christian 184–0.31%, Other 6–0.01%.

Total Population 60.060-100.00%

== See also ==
- List of towns in Uva
