= Thenmaradchi Divisional Secretariat =

- Divisional Secretariat
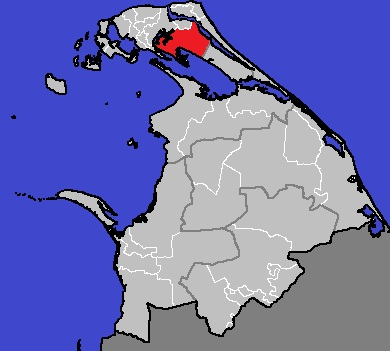
- Thenmarachchi Divisional Secretariat

- Location within Sri Lanka
- Country: Sri Lanka
- Province: Northern Province
- District: Jaffna District
- Time zone: UTC+5:30 (Sri Lanka Standard Time)

Thenmaradchi Divisional Secretariat is a Divisional Secretariat of Jaffna District, of Northern Province, Sri Lanka.

== Demography-Religion ==
Religion in Thenmaradchi DS Division (2012)
1. Buddhist (0.20%)
2. Hindu (92.7%)
3. Muslim (0.10%)
4. Roman Catholic (3.80%)
5. Other Christian (3.30%)
6. Other (0.00%)
