= Padeniya =

Coordinates: 7°39′13″N 80°13′43″E

- Village
- Interactive map of Padeniya
- Country: Sri Lanka
- Province: North Western Province
- Time zone: UTC+5:30 (Sri Lanka Standard Time)

Padeniya is a village in Sri Lanka. It is located within North Western Province.

== Geography ==
Padeniya is a small city of Kurunegala in North Western Province. which is about 25 km away from the Kurunegala City. Padeniya is located in Puttalam- Kurunegala Main Road between Nikaweratiya and Wariyapola. Padeniya provides a Junction the Anuradhapura.

== See also ==
- List of towns in North Western Province, Sri Lanka
