= Road Development Authority =

Agency overview
- Formed: 1971 (as Territorial Civil Engineering Organisation); 1983 (as Road Development Authority)
- Jurisdiction: Government of Sri Lanka
- Headquarters: "Sethsiripaya", Battaramulla, Sri Lanka
- Annual budget: ~US$ 2 Billion
- Parent department: Ministry of Highways, Ports and Shipping
- Child agency: Expressway Operation Maintenance and Management Division
- Website: www.rda.gov.lk www.exway.rda.gov.lk

The Road Development Authority (commonly abbreviated as RDA); (Sinhala: මාර්ග සංවර්ධන අධිකාරිය; Tamil: வீதி அபிவிருத்தி அதிகார சபை) is the premier highway authority in Sri Lanka and is responsible for the maintenance and development of the National Highway Network, comprising the trunk (A class) and main roads and the planning, design and construction of new highways, bridges and expressways to augment the existing network.

The RDA plans the future road network while conducting feasibility studies before major projects and post-evaluations after completion to ensure adequate economic returns.

== See also ==
- Highway museum complex, Kiribathkumbura
