= List of B-Grade highways in Sri Lanka =

This is a list of B-grade roads in Sri Lanka sorted by route number. Terminal points and route length are also included.

Road Number	Route	Length (km)
B001	Akkaraipattu - Warapathanchenai	20.92
B002	Akkaraipattu - Sagamam	18.50
B003	Akuressa - Kamburupitiya	13.27
B004	Akuressa - Ketanwila	5.63
B005	Aladeniya - Iriyagama	9.65
B006	Alakolanga - Pottepitiya	9.25
B007	Alawatugoda - Ankumbura - Keppetigala	14.79
B008	Alawwa - Dampelessa	14.64
B009	Alawwa - Maharagama	14.63
B010	Allai - Kantale	41.03
B011	Anagarika Dharmapala mawatha, Dehiwela (Municipal council - Malwatta)	1.96
B012	Aluthgama - Wigoda	8.05
B013	Alvai - Nelliady - Tunnalai	8.53
B014	Ambalangoda - Elpitiya - Pitigala	29.36
B015	Ambatenne - Bokkawela - Arambekade	19.90
B016	Ampara Airport Road	4.83
B017	Ampara Town Roads	30.57
B018	Ampilanthurai - Veeramunai	26.38
B019	Anamaduwa - Uswewa - Galgamuwa	39.02
B020	Ananda Avenue	0.24
B021	Andalla - Tissa	6.63
B022	Anderson Avenue	0.11
B023	Approach Road to Admiralty Building	28.32
B024	Approach Road to Aerodrome Ratmalana	2.93
B025	Approach Road to Laxapana Power House	11.54
B026	Approach Road to Midford Power House	0.97
B027	Approach Roads to Railway Stations	17.68
B028	Approach Road to Wilpattu Sanctuary	7.74
B029	Approach Roads to University Buildings	19.31
B030	Approach Roads to Public Buildings	21.54
B031	Arasady - Malkampiddy	5.23
B032	Attidiya - Mount-Lavinia	2.41
B033	Avarangal - Thondamanaru	6.03
B034	Ayagama - Kukulegama	16.89
B035	Badalkumbura - Buttala - Sella Kataragama	56.32
B036	Badulla - Karametiya - Andaulpotha	48.10
B037	Baladaksha Mawatha, Galle	0.56
B038	Balangoda - Bowatte - Kaltota	28.96
B039	Balangoda - Rassagala - Uwella	13.26
B040	Balapitiya - Watugedera	3.22
B041	Bandaranaika Mawatha, Galle	0.56
B042	Bandarawela - Liyangahawela - Poonagala	21.56
B043	Bandarawela - Uva Hihglands - Ettampitiya	16.49
B044	Bandarawela - Welimada	21.72
B045	Bangadeniya - Andigama - Anamaduwa	38.21
B046	Bar Road - Batticaloa	4.67
B047	Battaramulla - Pannipitiya	7.29
B048	Batukotuwa - Medirigiriya	8.69
B049	Bazaar Street, Ambalangoda	1.69
B050	Bazaar Street, Gampaha	0.05
B051	Bazzar Street and Edingburgh Street	0.63
B052	Bazzar Street, Vavuniya	2.09
B053	Beach Road Mullaitivu	0.87
B054	Beliatta - Walasmulla	15.69
B055	Bentara - Uragaha - Elpitiya	26.95
B056	Bibile - Medagama - Nakkala	33.79
B057	Bibile - Uraniya - Mahiyangana	39.58
B058	Biyanwila - Ganemulla	8.05
B059	Bo Tree Road	2.01
B060	Bogahawewa - Pulmuddai	27.76
B061	Boossa - Hegoda	1.61
B062	Borella - Rajagiriya (CMC Limits to Filling Station - Rajagiriya)	1.30
B063	Botale - Mirigama	5.63
B064	Bowatenna Access Road	2.41
B065	Bowatte - Padiwela	6.44
B066	Boyagama - Mandandawala	2.09
B067	Bulathkohupitiya - Dedugala	12.47
B068	Ingiriya - Halwatura - Egaloya	8.85
B069	Buwelikada - Lewella	1.30
B070	By pass road via Asgiriya	0.98
B071	Carolina - Norton - Wanarajah	23.73
B072	Cemetery Road (Gampaha)	0.26
B073	Chadayantalawa - Uhana	11.26
B074	Chavakachcheri - Kachchai	6.44
B075	Chavakachcheri - Puloly	19.31
B076	Chavakachcheri - Thannankilappu	3.62
B077	Chavalakadai - Chadayantalawa	8.05
B078	Chilaw Road, Negombo	1.26
B079	Chilaw - Wariyapola	50.64
B080	Chundikuli - Colombouthurai	2.56
B081	Chunnakam Power Station Road	0.16
B082	Circular Road, Kurunegala	9.84
B083	Circular Road, Tangalle	1.45
B084	Colombo - Horana	28.01
B085	Cross Road - Medawachchiya	0.48
B086	Dambagahapitiya - Pinnagolla - Arawa - Meegahakiula	13.32
B087	Dambokka - Katupitiya	8.85
B088	Dandagamuwa - Udawela	13.27
B089	Danikittawa - Ambanpola	22.33
B090	Danowita - Mirigama	8.61
B091	Daulagala - Watadeniya	7.45
B092	Deegawapi Temple Road	6.44
B093	Dehiowita - Deraniyagala - Noori	27.96
B094	Dehiwela - Maharagama	7.64
B095	Delgoda - Dompe - Giridara	12.07
B096	Dematagoda - Wellampitiya	1.93
B097	Demodera - Spring Valley - Badulla	21.32
B098	Denegama - Mulatiyana	11.26
B099	Deniyaya - Viharahena	8.04
B100	Dikwella - Jangulla - Talpitigala	24.14
B101	Dikwella - Beliatta	13.27
B102	Diyatalawa - Aluthwela North	2.81
B103	Diyatalawa - Aluthwela South	1.96
B104	Diyatalawa - Mirahawatta	6.44
B105	Diyatalawa - Welanhinna - Walagahawela	5.63
B106	Dodanduwa - Gonapinuwala	3.86
B107	Dondra Light House Road	1.25
B108	Dunagaha - Nilpanagoda	5.79
B109	Edmand Mawatha, Galle	4.02
B110	Eheliyagoda - Dehiowita	16.78
B111	Ekala - Kotadeniyawa	26.95
B112	Elahera - Giritale	39.42
B113	Ella - Passara	27.55
B114	Elpitiya - Avittawa - Lewwanduwa	27.56
B115	Embilipitiya - Panamure - Bulutota	38.62
B116	Embilmeegama - Daulagala - Penideniya	11.26
B117	Eppawala - Timbiriwewa	15.69
B118	Eriyagama - Penideniya	0.93
B119	Erukkalampuddy - Causeway	0.80
B120	Etulkotte - Mirihana - Kohuwela	5.95
B121	Gadaladeniya - Paranapattiya	5.23
B122	Galagedara - Rambukkana	18.50
B123	Galagedera - Horana	19.05
B124	Galagoda - Weligepola	7.24
B125	Galaha - Pupuressa - Delpitiya (Section 2)	28.96
B126	Galgamuwa - Nikawewa	24.54
B127	Galigomuwa - Ruwanwella	22.53
B128	Galle - Baddegama	19.31
B129	Galle - Udugama	36.60
B130	Galle - Wakwella	6.84
B131	Galmadu - Muwangala - Hingurana	7.64
B132	Gampola - Craighead	15.93
B133	Ganewelpola - Dachchahalmillewa	45.86
B134	Gangodawila - Boralesgamuwa	2.61
B135	Geli Oya - Embekke	4.23
B136	Gevilipitiya - Hettimulla	15.37
B137	Ginoya - Bolawatte - Dankotuwa	4.70
B138	Gintota Plywood Factory Road	4.51
B139	Gonadeniya - Udugama	4.02
B140	Gravets Road	5.71
B141	Hakmana - Beliatta - Tangalle	19.31
B142	Hakmana - Meella - Talahaganwaduwa	11.26
B143	Halpatota - Kurundugahahetekma	16.49
B144	Halwatura Estate Road	1.00
B145	Hanwella Junction Road	0.80
B146	Hanwella - Pugoda - Weke - Urapola	24.14
B147	Haputale - Dambetenne	9.32
B148	Harangala - Kalapitiya - Kumbaloluwa	23.39
B149	Hatton - Maskeliya - Dalhousie	32.97
B150	Hedeniya - Pujapitiya	8.05
B151	Hendala - Hunupitiya	4.02
B152	Mattakkuliya - Uswetakeiyawa - Pinwattha	7.66
B153	Hikkaduwa - Baddegama - Nilhena	14.88
B154	Hindagala - Naranwita - Gampola	15.78
B155	Hingurakgoda - Yoda Ela	5.63
B156	Hiniduma - Opatha - Pitabeddera	31.38
B157	Horana - Anguruwatota - Aluthgama	54.14
B158	Horawela - Pelawatte - Pitigala	25.74
B159	Ibbagamuwa - Kumbukgete - Madagalla	34.19
B160	Idangoda - Ayagama	13.68
B161	Imbulgoda - Weliweriya	4.42
B162	Inamaluwa - Sigiriya	9.17
B163	Ingiriya - Halwatura	2.96
B164	Jaffna Junction - Sri Maha Bodhi	2.41
B165	Kachcheri Beach Fort Road	3.62
B166	Kadahapola - Rambawewa	18.71
B167	Kadawalagedara - Vitikuliya	13.84
B168	Kadawata - Ragama - Welisara	8.05
B169	Kadawatha - Mawaramandiya	3.54
B170	Kadduwan - Mallakam - Chankanai	11.26
B171	Kadduwan - Myliddy	3.72
B172	Kadugannawa - Gampola	17.30
B173	Kadugannawa - Pottepitiya	8.45
B174	Kaduwela - Athurugiriya	9.25
B175	Kahambiliyagoda - Suriyagoda	0.40
B176	Kahawa - Batapola	8.37
B177	Kahawatte - Ela-Bemmullegedara	12.23
B178	Kakkapalliya - Thambagalla	6.84
B179	Kalagedihena - Veyangoda	4.10
B180	Kalalpitiya - Ukuwala - Elkaduwa	13.47
B181	Kalawana - Depdene - Rakwana	46.66
B182	Kalawewa - Avukana	4.68
B183	Kaleliya - Pallewela - Medagampitiya	10.22
B184	Kalkudah Road	5.63
B185	Kalkudah - Valachchenai	4.42
B186	Kalmunai Sea View Road	1.21
B187	Kalmunai - Chavalakadai	4.38
B188	Kaluaggala - Labugama	14.00
B189	Kalugala - Polpitiya - Laxapana	11.26
B190	Kalugamuwa - Wilakatupotha	21.11
B191	Kalutara - Nagoda	5.74
B192	Kandasamykovil - Kaluthaipiddy	3.38
B193	Kandasamykovil - Nachchimarkovil	2.43
B194	Kandaswamy Mawatha	1.21
B195	Kandy - Kirimetiya	16.09
B196	Kantale Perathuveli Road	2.25
B197	Karainagar Circular Road	6.77
B198	Karaiyoor Reclamation	3.06
B199	Karandupona - Rambukkana	8.85
B200	Karappikade Extension Road	0.40
B201	Karuwalagaswewa - Miyallewa	19.31
B202	Kataragama - Sella-Kataragama	5.05
B203	Katpaha - Pulliar Kovil Road	1.61
B204	Katubedde - Kospelena	1.82
B205	Katugastota - Madawala - Bambarella	34.89
B206	Katugastota - Medawela	10.30
B207	Katukurunda - Neboda	16.49
B208	Katunayake - Veyangoda	22.32
B209	Kebithigollewa Extension Road	1.85
B210	Kebithigollewa New Town Road	0.97
B211	Kebithigollewa - Padaviya	33.79
B212	Kekirawa - Ganewelpola	6.95
B213	Kekirawa - Talawa	37.41
B214	Kelaniya - Mudungoda	27.76
B215	Kelaniya - Wedamulla (Waragoda)	3.22
B216	Kesbewa - Kindelpitiya - Bandaragama	11.78
B217	Ketapola - Omatta - Thotupola	1.61
B218	Kibissa - Digampathana	6.03
B219	King George Avenue	0.48
B220	Kiribathgoda - Hunupitiya	3.59
B221	Kiribathgoda - Oil Refinery, Sapugaskande	5.07
B222	Kiriella - Nedurana - Eheliyagoda	14.08
B223	Kirimetitenna - Galgoda	5.63
B224	Kirimetiya - Yala	17.17
B225	Kirindiwita - Assennawatte	12.87
B226	Kirindiwita - Ganemulla	2.82
B227	Kiriyankalli - Andigama	13.68
B228	Kochchikade - Halpe	9.46
B229	Kohuwela - Dehiwela	2.74
B230	Kokkuvil - Vaddukoddai	8.45
B231	Kolonnawa - Gothatuwa - Angoda	3.22
B232	Kolonnawa - Yakbedde	2.41
B233	Kong Tree Road	0.53
B234	Korakahawewa - Sri Maha Bodhi	4.83
B235	Koralawella - Egoda-Uyana	5.84
B236	Koslande - Poonagala	11.55
B237	Kotadeniyawa - Mirigama	8.05
B238	Kottawa - Batemulla	13.68
B239	Kottawa - Talagala	15.48
B240	Batttaramulla - Malabe - Godagama - Padukka - Bope	28.80
B241	Kudapaduwa - Kammalturai	3.01
B242	Kudugala - Wattegama	12.07
B243	Kuliyapitiya - Hettipola	15.69
B244	Kuliyapitiya - Padiwela	11.26
B245	Kurana Road	0.88
B246	Kurana - Taladuwa	1.85
B247	Kurunegala - Narammala - Kuliyapitiya - Madampe	64.36
B248	Labuduwa - Wandurambe - Sandarawela	22.12
B249	Lady Macallums Drive	5.63
B250	Lake Road, No.1, Batticaloa	0.90
B251	Lewaya Road	3.54
B252	Lindula to end of Agras Road	22.24
B253	Lowland - Panaliya	1.80
B254	Mabima - Sapugaskanda	3.22
B255	Madampe - Chettiyar Street	0.31
B256	Madawala - Rajawella	8.21
B257	Madulkelle - Kabaragala - Kandenuwara	20.92
B258	Mahakeliya - Katupotha	12.87
B259	Main Access to Gam Udawa 87	6.39
B260	Main Road to Vettappalai	3.62
B261	Main Street, Negombo	0.43
B262	Makola - Udupila	8.85
B263	Malabe - Kaduwela	5.63
B264	Mallawapitiya - Rambodagalla - Keppetigala	34.59
B265	Malwala - Carney	14.48
B266	Malwattha - Chadayantalawa	5.63
B267	Mampe - Kottawa	6.23
B268	Manipay - Kaithady	13.68
B269	Mankulam - Vellankulam	37.81
B270	Mannar Market Street - Sebastian Hospital	2.33
B271	Maradagahamulla - Badalgama	7.64
B272	Marawila - Udubaddawa	19.87
B273	Maskeliya - Upcot	8.70
B274	Matale - Illukkumbura-Pallegama	46.80
B275	Matara - Hakmana	24.14
B276	Mathagal - Pandatherippu - Sambiliturai	6.61
B277	Maviddapuram - Keeramalai	2.94
B278	Mawanella - Aranayake - Horawela	14.45
B279	Mawanella - Hemmaththagama - Singhapitiya	25.80
B280	Mawathagama - Barandara	8.25
B281	Mawathagama - Muwankanda	8.85
B282	Medawachchiya - Horowopotana	37.81
B283	Medawachchiya - Kebitigollewa	25.74
B284	Meddewatte - Kekanadure - Yatiyana	14.64
B285	Meepe - Ingiriya	18.09
B286	Middeniya - Panamure	13.27
B287	Minneriya - Hingurakgoda (Airport Road)	8.85
B288	Minuwangoda - Gampaha - Miriswatte	13.27
B289	Minuwangoda - Miriswatte - Katana	12.63
B290	Mirigama - Nalla	8.21
B291	Mirihana - Udahamulla - Nawinna	3.38
B292	Miriswatte - Waturugama	10.06
B293	Moneragala Town Road	0.45
B294	Moragaswewa - Ilukwewa	10.06
B295	Moratuwa - Piliyandala	4.83
B296	Puliyankulam-Mullaittivu	42.68
B297	Mullaitivu - Kokkilai	36.20
B298	Munai Street, Batticaloa	0.43
B299	Murunkan - Chilawathurai	15.29
B300	Muttetugala - Hiripitiya	18.50
B301	Nadukudai Road	2.41
B302	Nagoda - Gallassa Colony Road	3.70
B303	Nagoda - Gonadeniya	3.62
B304	Nagoda - Kalawellawa - Bellapitiya	55.51
B305	Nallur - Oddumadam	2.41
B306	Nanu Oya - Hendeniya	2.41
B307	Narahenpita - Nawala - Nugegoda	3.22
B308	Narammala - Dankotuwa	45.25
B309	Narandeniya - Hakmana	11.67
B310	Nartupana - Warakagoda	3.22
B311	Nattarampotha - Yakgahapitiya	2.83
B312	Naula - Elahera - Pallegama - Hettipola	64.37
B314	Naval Camp Road	0.80
B315	Navanturai - Oddumadam	1.21
B316	Navinna - Boralesgamuwa	2.41
B317	Nawalapitiya - Dimbula	31.18
B318	Nawalapitiya - Dolosbage	19.71
B319	Nawalapitiya - Ginigathena	12.07
B320	Nayapamulla - Unanwitiya - Nagoda	12.07
B321	Negombo - Aluthepola	14.67
B322	Negombo - Giriulla	37.81
B323	Negombo - Kadirana	3.62
B324	Negombo - Mirigama	30.57
B325	Nelukkulam - Neriyakulam	21.72
B326	Nikaweratiya - Moragollagama - Siyambalangamuwa	48.51
B327	Nilaweli Salt Office Road	1.64
B328	Norton - Maskeliya	16.80
B329	Norwood - Bogowantalawa - Campion	16.89
B330	Norwood - Upcot	12.71
B331	Nuwara Eliya Town Road	2.41
B332	Nuwara Eliya - Uda Pussellawa	46.00
B333	Oddamavadi - Vahaneri	9.25
B334	Oddusudan - Nedunkerny	10.86
B335	Old Bazaar Road, Maharagama	0.80
B336	Old Kandy Road	0.69
B337	Old Road, Kattankudy	7.67
B338	Old Tangalle Road, Matara	2.41
B339	Olugantota - Pinnawala - Bogowantalawa	35.14
B340	ORR's Hill Road	3.38
B341	Outer Circular Road (Nochchiyagama)	9.78
B342	Padaviya - Galkulama	14.67
B343	Padaviya - Parakrama Pura (Bandaranayake Mawatha)	10.06
B344	Padiruppu - Vellaveli	6.03
B345	Pagoda - Pitakotte	1.61
B346	Palapathwela - Galewela	28.16
B347	Palathoppu - Seruwila Road	7.82
B348	Palavi - Kalladi	7.24
B349	Palavi - Kalpitiya	40.23
B350	Pallang Oya - Inginiyagala	12.87
B351	Pallebedde - Medaganoya - Weligepola	12.47
B352	Pallimunai Road	1.29
B353	Palugama - Boralande - Haputale	26.55
B354	Panagoda - Henpita	6.44
B355	Panama - Kumbukkana	17.70
B356	Pannala - Kuliyapitiya	16.25
B357	Paranthan - Poonakary	25.74
B358	Parussella - Panapitiya	5.12
B359	Passara - Hingurukaduwa - Pelwatte	30.17
B360	Passara - Madulsima - Metigahatenna	29.93
B361	Pasyala - Attanagalla	6.84
B362	Pattanwila - Makola	1.80
B363	Pelawatta - Kankotayawatta - Tinniyawela - Morawaka	53.18
B364	Peradeniya - Deltota - Rikiligaskada	52.13
B365	Peradeniya - Halloluwa - Katugastota	10.61
B366	Perkar Road	2.41
B367	Piliyandala - Maharagama	7.37
B368	Pitakotte - Talawatugoda	4.23
B369	Pitiyagedera - Wattegama - Iriyagastenne	5.15
B370	Point Pedro East Coast Road	3.94
B371	Point Pedro - Maruthankerny	28.96
B372	Police Station Circular Road, Badulla	1.29
B373	Poonewa - Kidavaramkulama	3.22
B374	Potuvil - Panama	17.70
B375	Power House Road - Thirugnanasampauthar	1.61
B376	Prison Road, Tangalle	0.23
B377	Pujapitiya - Alawatugoda	8.05
B378	Puliyadi - Irakkamam Madu	10.86
B379	Puttalam - Marichchikadai	65.97
B380	Puttur - Kantharoday	12.47
B381	Radaella Short Cut Road	3.38
B382	Ragama - Kandana	4.55
B383	Rakwana - Bulutota	1.13
B384	Rambukkana - Katupitiya	9.81
B385	Rambukkana - Mawanella	16.89
B386	Ranatunga Mawatha	0.11
B387	Ranna - Udayala - Weeraketiya	15.69
B388	Ratmalana - Borupona	1.93
B389	Ratmalana - Mirihana	8.05
B390	Ratnapura - Palawela - Karawita	22.53
B391	Ratnapura - Wewelwatte	28.00
B392	Rattota - Gammaduwa	11.26
B393	Ridigama - Liniwehera	2.01
B394	Roads to Kataragama Planning Scheme	14.48
B395	Roads to Saltern & Town Roads	8.88
B396	Roehampton - Diyatalawa - Bandarawela	9.90
B397	Sacred City Road, Nochchiyagama	17.68
B398	Sandilipay - Senthankulam	7.72
B399	Sangilithoppu - Chemmny	3.43
B400	Seeduwa - Udugampola	11.62
B401	Siyambalape - Galwalkada	4.42
B402	Soranapattu - Thalayadi	7.48
B403	South Coast Road (Thallady - Arrippu - Marrichchkadai)	46.66
B404	Sri Ariyavilasa Road, Horana	0.50
B405	Sri Somananda Mawatha, Horana	0.85
B406	Stony Cliff - Kotagala	6.31
B407	St. Joseph's Street, Negombo	2.82
B408	Talduwa - Meewitigammana	18.90
B409	Talgodapitiya - Yatawatte - Dombawala	29.36
B410	Tangalle - Weeraketiya	14.48
B411	Tawalama - Neluwa - Batuwangala	9.65
B412	Tawalantenne - Talawakela	33.36
B413	Tennekumbura - Rikiligaskada - Ragala	72.67
B414	Thavadi - Suthumalai	2.62
B415	Thihagoda - Kamburupitiya - Mawarala - Kotapola	67.58
B416	Thihariya - Warapalana	5.39
B417	Thoandamanaru - Vallai - Tunnalai	12.87
B418	Thondamanaru - Udupiddy	2.70
B419	Thoppu - Madampe	26.95
B420	Thumpalai - Valalai	4.83
B421	Tiruwanaketiya - Agalawatte	67.98
B422	Tissa - Kirinde	13.11
B423	Tonigala - Kalawewa - Galewela	45.78
B424	Trincomalee - Pulmoddai	55.11
B425	Tudella - Pamunugama - Talahena - Negombo	20.11
B426	Tummodera - Puwakpitiya	9.65
B427	Udawalawe - Tanamalwila	35.40
B428	Udawela - Kumbukgahamulla	1.93
B429	Udugama - Hiniduma	11.26
B430	Udugampola - Divulapitiya	14.88
B431	Ulapane - Pussellawa	22.53
B432	Uraliyagara - Panirendawa - Villattewa	14.48
B433	Urani Road	3.22
B434	Urapola - Waturugama	7.08
B435	Urugodawatte - Ambatale	8.05
B436	Vaddukoddai - Moolai	2.82
B437	Vallai - Telippalai - Araly	27.43
B438	Vallai-udupiddy - Velvettiturai	5.63
B439	Varapathanchenai - Deegawapi	7.64
B440	Veeragoda Central Camp Road	16.09
B441	Velani - Kayts	6.77
B442	Velikulam - Mamaduwa	8.05
B443	Veyangoda - Banduragoda	8.62
B444	Veyangoda - Kaleliya	7.45
B445	Veyangoda - Ruwanwella	32.18
B446	Vijitha Road	0.24
B447	Vilgam Vihara Road	4.18
B448	Villu Road	0.90
B449	Wadduwa - Morontuduwa	5.28
B450	Walasmulla - Weeraketiya	8.05
B451	Walgama - Aturugiriya	1.77
B452	Walgama - Diyagama	7.06
B453	Walpola - Mailawalana	9.25
B454	Wandurambe - Ethumale - Yakkatuwa	36.20
B455	Wandurambe - Kottawa	9.73
B456	Warakapola - Kandalama	10.86
B457	Warakapola - Ruwanwella	22.53
B458	Waskaduwa - Bandaragama	12.07
B459	Wattala - Hekitta	1.56
B460	Wattala - Mahara	7.24
B461	Wattegama - Kandenuwara - Wariyapola	30.65
B462	Wattegama - Matale	13.00
B463	Weeraketiya - Middeniya	12.87
B464	Weerawila - Tissa - Kataragama	23.89
B465	Weligama - Kananke	9.65
B466	Weligama - Telijjawila	11.26
B467	Weligepola - Handagiriya	10.06
B468	Welihena - Katana	5.02
B469	Welikada - Kohilawatta	6.03
B470	Welikada - Nawala	2.57
B471	Welimada - Kirklees	17.83
B472	Weliweriya - Kirindiwela	12.87
B473	Wennappuwa - Kirimetiyana	5.63
B474	Weragantota - Randenigala	22.20
B475	Bulugolla - Dombemada - Wahawa	13.64
B476	Weweldeniya - Mirigama	6.44
B477	Wewelwatte - Agarsland - Uwella	9.49
B478	Wilakatupotha - Ganewattha - Kumbukgete	21.69
B479	Yakkala - Radawana	12.87
B480	Yakkalamulla - Ketanwila	14.48
B481	Yatadolawatta Road	2.82
B482	Yatiyantota - Poonagala - Meenagala	24.14
B483	Sammanthurai - Malkampiddi - Deegawapiya	14.90
B484	Handungamuwa - Hettipola - Hasalaka	45.05
B485	Walasmulla - Katuwana - Middeniya	26.15
B486	Embilipitiya - Middeniya	14.48
B487	Atugala Road, Kurunegala	1.70
B488	Polonnaruwa - Tambala - Sungawila - Somawathiya	42.68
B489	Roads within President's pavilion Kandy	0.75
B490	Atabage - Ulapane Road	7.50
B491	Kotmale Dam Crest- Harangala Road	1.40
B492	Kandehandiya - Adikarigama - Randenigala - Loggal Oya	54.40
B493	Moragahamula - Victoriya Damtop	8.40
B494	Victoriya Damtop - Adikarigama	2.30
B495	Edandawela - Kahahengama	2.00
B496	Thanamalwila - Hambegamuwa(Thanamalwila - Bodagama)	5.50
B497	51st Mile post - Ulhitiyawa	8.04
B498	Barrier Junction - Girandura Kotte	7.00
B499	Kirinda - Palatupana - Yala	29.00
B500	Tissa - Akurugoda	1.10
B501	Andarawewa - Balaluwewa( Jeya Mawatha )	52.75
B502	Manampitiya - Aralaganwila - Maduru oya	33.00
B503	Makandura - Badalgama	4.50
B504	Maharagama - Pamunuwa - Thalapathpitiya	2.40
B505	Phala Eriyagama - Penideniya	0.86
B506	Nawalapitiya - Harangala	11.52
B507	Rendapola - Ambewela	8.24
B508	Welimade - Borelanda - Ohiya - Horton Plains	32.47
B509	Kuttampokuna - Galpalama	3.22
B510	Kesbewa - Kosgashandiya	1.70
B511	Keerthibandrapura - Naranthalawa	4.42
B512	Blackpool Ambewela Pattipola Horton Plains	28.16
B513	Kumbukkana Okkampitiya maligawila	15.20
B514	Internal Roads in ith Sacred City Mahiyangana	2.35
B515	Road Parallel to halpanu Ela	1.10
B516	Etalai - Talawila (Jubily Mawatha)	4.70
B517	Dehiattakandiya - Aralaganwila	21.10
B518	Sangaraja Mawatha - Kandy	1.76
B519	Yatinuwara Veediya - Kandy	0.60
B520	Kande Veediya - Kandy	0.11
B521	Mosque Road - Kandy	0.38
B522	Buttala - Helagama - Okkampitiya	9.00
B523	Elpitiya By Pass	0.58
B524	Beach Road Matara( Matara By Pass)	2.40
B525	Dikwella - Wewurukannala	1.87
B526	Baddegama - Halpatota	1.65
B527	Bibile - Pitakumbura - Namal Oya - Inginiyagala	60.25
B528	Bodagma - Hambegamuwa - Kaltota	48.20
B529	Polonnaruwa - New Town Road	3.60
B530	Udahamulla - Thalapathpitiya	2.06
B531	Parliament Drive	0.72
B532	Approach Road to Sri Jayawardenepura Parliament	0.43
B533	Pelawatta Access Road	0.83
B534	Nawala - Pagoda Link Road	0.27
B535	Nilwala By pass	1.83
B536	Kamburupitiya - Kirinda	9.20
B537	Barigama - Halloluwa	5.76
B538	Kahatagasdigiliya - Rathmalgahaweewa - Kivulekade	24.32
B539	Nelundeniya - Alawwa	8.20
B540	Nelundeniya - Tuntota - Galapitamada	14.00
B541	Thampalakamam - Kinniya	15.60
B542	Lady Manning Drive	1.00
B543	Liyods Avenu	0.42
B544	Moragolla - Bellana	9.83
B545	Approach Road to National Food Stores, Rathmalana(Kaldemulla Rd)	1.37
B546	New Nuga Road	1.30
B547	Kawdana Attidiya	2.50
B548	Ranna Angunakolapelessa Vatiya	16.14
B549	Embilipitiya - Moraketiya - Kiriibbanara - Uda Mauara	16.82
B550	Dharmashoka Mawatha	2.76
B551	Luvi Peris Mawatha	0.86
B552	Polonnaruwa - Hingurakgoda	13.65
B553	Old Kesbewa Road	0.85
B554	Ragama Karagahamuna (Ragama to Thewattha section)	2.00
B555	Access road to Getabaru Temple	1.70
B556	Madatugama Pubbogama Andiyagala	13.26
B557	Circular Road - Devinuwara	0.43
B558	Kosgoda Uragaha Road	6.00
B559	Sinhasana Road	0.82
B560	Council Avenue, Dehiwala	0.14
B561	Dambulla Kandalama	0.80
B562	Mirijjawila Sooriyawewa	23.30
B563	Sooriyawewa Padalangala	12.00
B564	Otappuwa Ihalawewa	13.80
B565	Walasmulla By Pass	0.37
B566	Nakulugamuwa Kudawella Moraketiara	3.90
B567	Weligaththa Lunugamwehera	23.60
B568	Hurigaswewa Kalankuttioya Siyambalangamuwa	14.12
B569	Access to Gampaha Railway Station (Queen Mary's Road)	1.16
B646	Mudungoda Gampaha (Orutota Road)	5.15
B571	Approach Road to College of Education - Addalaichenai	1.15
B572	Addalachenai Alankulam	9.75
B573	Akkaraipattu Deegavapi Ambalatharu	23.00
B574	Flood ProtectionRoad, Akkaraipattu	2.13
B649	Kulavadi Central Camp	5.23
B576	By Pass Road to Pallikkudiyiruppu village on Akkaraipattu Varapathanchenai Road	1.34
B577	Belaganwewa Hembarawa Wilgamuwa	11.63
B578	Dorape Hiyare	8.60
B579	Polonnaruwa - New Town - Kaduruwela (Nidahas Swarna Jayanthoi Mawatha)	4.61
B580	Nikatupitiya Junction to Mapakadawewa Junction	8.32
B581	Welimada By Pass	0.08
B582	Gomburuoya - Balapokuna	8.50
B583	Mawanella By Pass	1.90
B584	Lathpandura Molkawa	11.78
B585	Kaluwamodara Kandevihara	1.09
B586	Park Road Matale	0.33
B587	Sooriyawewa Hathporuwa Moraketiya	13.60
B588	Dedugala Dolosbage	12.41
B589	Hidellana Karapincha (Approach Road to Tea Research Institute -Law Country Region)	4.10
B590	Udayagiri Rajamahavihara Road	1.10
B591	Uyanwatta Polgolla Dam	0.60
B592	Hettimulla Deewala Ussapitiya	12.60
B593	Pambahinna Kumbalgama Rajawaka Kapugala	28.42
B594	Galle Port Access	5.20
B595	Hunnadeniya Rathmale Radampola Walasgala	12.30
B596	Uswetakeiyawa Epamulla Pamunugama	8.05
B597	Kandawala Katunayake	4.50
B598	Seeduwa Katunayake	3.90
B599	Mabopitiya Degalaeriya	3.71
B600	Meepitiya Ekiriyagala Paragammana	5.10
B601	Kegalle Siyambalapitiya Dewalegama	4.40
B602	Morontota Arandara	8.30
B603	Magmmana Kurupettha Daigala Gurugalla	12.00
B604	Paragammana Dikella Atugoda Wanduradeniya	14.60
B605	Alawathura Yatapana Kotiyakumbura	6.15
B606	Katuwana - Rukmalpitiya - Hulankanda - Heegoda	9.00
B607	Bengamuwa - Molokgamuwa - Galdola	9.50
B608	Weera Maddumabandara Mawatha	0.14
B609	Hiripitiya - Galtemwewa	14.90
B610	Melsiripura - Rambe	12.70
B611	Thitthawella - Gonagama	15.27
B612	Ramboda - Pusulpitiya	2.38
B613	Kothmale New Town Road	1.05
B614	Battuluoya - Udappuwa - Andimunai	9.23
B615	Dambulla - Bakamuna - Kalagahawela	32.48
B616	Nochchiyagama - Kukulkatuwa	19.53
B617	Minneriya - Gal Oya	14.54
B618	Mollipothana - Soorangal	14.00
B619	Sardhapura - Kanniya	5.00
B620	Kanniya - Illuppaikulam	4.00
B621	Atabage - Dunukeulla	7.62
B622	Hungama - Thalawa - Middeniya	25.37
B623	Medamulana - Gonadeniya - Debokkawa	11.72
B624	Thalawa - Dambarella - Hingura	6.60
B625	Ambakolawewa - Morayaya - Gonadeniya	4.23
B626	Nalagama - Beliatta	6.60
B627	Dammulla - Weeraketiya	10.10
B628	Tangalle - Kadurupokuna - Beliatta	8.76
B629	Walasmulla - Julampitiya	13.10
B630	Beliatta - Kirinda	13.87
B631	Hambantota - Gonnoruwa - Meegahajandura	30.30
B632	Sapugaskanda Oil Refinery Junction - Biyagama Free Trade Zone (Samurdhi Mawatha)	6.77
B633	Access Road to Ja-Ela Interchange	2.57
B634	Access Road to Peliyagoda Interchange	2.10
B635	Access Road to Matara	1.34
B636	Akuressa By pass	1.76
B637	Pelena-Polwatta-Denipitiya	2.10
B638	Sri Maha Bodhi Access	3.10
B639	Piliyandala By Pass	2.865
B640	Nainamadama-Iranawila-Chilaw	31.66
B641	Kadawatha By pass	1.80
B642	Access road to Defence Headquarters Pelawatta (From Denzil Kobbekaduwa Mawatha, Koswatta to Defence Headquarters Pelawatta)	1.255
B643	Kegalle Bypass	4.400
B644	Kelanimulla-Angoda-Koswatta	4.567
B645	Pelawatta-Akuregoda-Pothuarawa	4.074
Total Distance		3723.39 km

== See also ==
- Transport in Sri Lanka
- List of A-Grade Roads in Sri lanka
