= Makola South Ihala Grama Niladhari Division =

Makola South Ihala
- Grama Niladhari Division
- Interactive map of Makola South Ihala
- Coordinates: 6.978259°N 79.968301°E
- Country: Sri Lanka
- Province: Western Province
- District: Gampaha District
- Divisional Secretariat: Biyagama Divisional Secretariat
- Electoral District: Gampaha Electoral District
- Polling Division: Biyagama Polling Division

Area
  - Total: 1.58 km^{2} (0.61 sq mi)
- Elevation: 37 m (121 ft)

Population (2012)
  - Total: 4,856
  - Density: 3,073/km^{2} (7,960/sq mi)
- ISO 3166 code: LK-1239080

Makola South Ihala

Makola South Ihala Grama Niladhari Division is a Grama Niladhari Division of the Biyagama Divisional Secretariat of Gampaha District of Western Province, Sri Lanka. It has Grama Niladhari Division Code 271.

Mawaramandiya are located within, nearby or associated with Makola South Ihala.

Makola South Ihala is a surrounded by the Heiyanthuduwa North, Sapugaskanda, Makola North Central, Makola North Ihala and Mawaramandiya Grama Niladhari Divisions.

== Demographics ==
=== Ethnicity ===
The Makola South Ihala Grama Niladhari Division has a Sinhalese majority (98.2%). In comparison, the Biyagama Divisional Secretariat (which contains the Makola South Ihala Grama Niladhari Division) has a Sinhalese majority (91.7%)

Ethnicity in Makola South Ihala
1. Sinhalese (98.2%)
2. Other (1.80%)

=== Religion ===
The Makola South Ihala Grama Niladhari Division has a Buddhist majority (93.8%). In comparison, the Biyagama Divisional Secretariat (which contains the Makola South Ihala Grama Niladhari Division) has a Buddhist majority (86.5%)

Religion in Makola South Ihala
1. Buddhist (93.8%)
2. Roman Catholic (3.70%)
3. Other Christian (1.30%)
4. Other (1.20%)
