= Alawwa =

Alawwa අලව්ව
- Town
- Location within Sri Lanka
- Coordinates: 7°17′48.4″N 80°14′06.2″E
- Country: Sri Lanka
- District: Kurunegala
- Time zone: UTC+5:30 (SLST)
- Postal code: 60280
- Area code: 037

Alawwa is a town and divisional secretariat of the Kurunegala District in the North Western Province of Sri Lanka. The town is considered part of the Coconut Triangle, where most of the country's coconut exports come from. The population was 63,667 according to the 2012 Sri Lankan census.

== Demography-Religion ==
Religion in Alawwa DS Division (2012)
1. Buddhist (99.1%)
2. Hindu (0.20%)
3. Muslim (0.00%)
4. Roman Catholic (0.40%)
5. Other Christian (0.30%)
6. Other (0.00%)

Alawwa is located at the border between the North Western Province and Sabaragamuwa Province. The two provinces are separated by the Maha Oya.

There are 66 Grama Niladhari Divisions in Alawwa Area.

== Transport ==
Alawwa has well established road and railway links. The city is located on the A6 (Ambepussa - Trincomallee Road). The B8 (Alawwa - Dampelessa Road), B9 (Alawwa - Maharagama Road), B539 (Nelundeniya - Alawwa Road) and many other regional roads emanate from Alawwa.

== Government Institutes ==
Alawwa Pradeshiya Sabha

== Schools ==
- Abbowa Maha Vidyalaya
- Boyawalana Maha Vidyalaya
- Humbuluwa central college
- Kandegedara Maha Vidyalaya
- Madawala Maha Vidyalaya
- Nungamuwa Damsen Central College
- Sri Rahula central college
- Rathanalankara Maha Vidyalaya
- Walakubura Maha Viddalaya
- Wayamba President College Pambadeniya
- Wewala Maha Vidyalaya

== Librarys ==
- Alawwa Public Library
- Boyawalana Public Library
- Maharachchimulla Public Library

== Hospitals ==
- Alawwa Regional Hospital
- Nawathalwattha Hospital

== Cinema Halls ==
- Cinemaal Movie Theater
- Sarasavi Cinema

== See also ==
- Alawwa railway station
- 2011 Alawwa rail accident
