= Kebellavita Grama Niladhari Division =

Kebellavita
- Grama Niladhari Division
- Interactive map of Kebellavita
- Coordinates: 7.313739°N 80.224670°E
- Country: Sri Lanka
- Province: North Western Province
- District: Kurunegala District
- Divisional Secretariat: Alawwa Divisional Secretariat
- Electoral District: Kurunegala Electoral District
- Polling Division: Dambadeniya Polling Division

Area
  - Total: 1.29 km^{2} (0.50 sq mi)
- Elevation: 107 m (351 ft)

Population (2012)
  - Total: 610
  - Density: 473/km^{2} (1,230/sq mi)
- ISO 3166 code: LK-6184205

Kebellavita

Kebellavita Grama Niladhari Division is a Grama Niladhari Division of the Alawwa Divisional Secretariat of Kurunegala District of North Western Province, Sri Lanka. It has Grama Niladhari Division Code 1004.

Kebellavita is a surrounded by the Alawwa North, Galpottepola, Humbuluwa East, Ihala Kalalpitiya and Nugawela Grama Niladhari Divisions.

== Demographics ==
=== Ethnicity ===
The Kebellavita Grama Niladhari Division has a Sinhalese majority (100.0%). In comparison, the Alawwa Divisional Secretariat (which contains the Kebellavita Grama Niladhari Division) has a Sinhalese majority (99.6%)

Ethnicity in Kebellavita
1. Sinhalese (100.0%)
2. Other (0.00%)

=== Religion ===
The Kebellavita Grama Niladhari Division has a Buddhist majority (98.7%). In comparison, the Alawwa Divisional Secretariat (which contains the Kebellavita Grama Niladhari Division) has a Buddhist majority (99.1%)

Religion in Kebellavita
1. Buddhist (98.7%)
2. Other (1.30%)
