= Deepal Silva =

- දීපාල් සිල්වා
- Born: November 20, 1967; Pinkanda, Dodanduwa, Sri Lanka
- Died: 14 January 2017 (aged 49); Makola, Sri Lanka
- Other name: Podi Lamaya
- Education: St. Sebastian's College, Moratuwa
- Occupations: Playback Singer, Actor
- Spouse: Kusum de Silva

Deepal Silva (20 November 1967 – 14 January 2017) was a Sri Lankan play-back singer and actor.

== Personal life ==
Deepal Silva was born on 20 November 1967 in Pinkanda, Dodanduwa. His father K.P Silva was a retired pharmaceutical officer of Sri Lanka Army. His mother Leela Silva was a former medical nurse. He was married to Kusum de Silva and lived in Makola, Kiribathgoda. He had his primary education from Pinwatte Primary School and then moved to Baddegama Karairas Boys College. He finished his advanced levels from St. Sebatine's College, Moratuwa.

== Career ==
Prior to performing in music industry, Silva was engaged in theatre dramas, usually as a supporting actor in most occasions. Silva started performing since 1990, under the stage name, Podi Lamaya. Deepal was a cricket fan and didn't accept shows if they clashed with cricket matches. He was a continuous performer in outdoor musical programs. After the comedian actor Nihal Silva was dead, Silva started to perform his stage drama Sargent Nallathambi.

However, with busy schedule in outdoor musical programs, he decided to quit dramas. After 15 years, he started his first stage drama with the name Security Sinnatambi. The muhurath ceremony was held on his birthday in 2015, and the show reached 50 screenings from one year and half months.

== Death ==
He died at the Ragama Hospital (Colombo North Teaching Hospital) on 14 January 2017, at age 50.

== Stage works ==
- Security Sinnathambi
