= A1 highway (Sri Lanka) =

Road in Sri Lanka

Coordinates: 6.977376°N 79.926374°E

Route information
- Part of Asian Highway AH43
- Maintained by the Road Development Authority
- Length: 115.85 km (71.99 mi)
- Existed: 1820–present

Major junctions
- West end: Colombo
- Peliyagoda - A3 Yakkala - A33 Ambepussa - A6 Kegalle - A19, A21 Peradeniya - A5
- East end: Kandy

Location
- Country: Sri Lanka
- Major cities: Kegalle,

Highway system
- Roads in Sri Lanka; Expressways; A-Grade; B-Grade

The A1 road (commonly known as the Colombo - Kandy Road or just the Kandy Road) is an A-Grade trunk road in Sri Lanka. It connects the capital city of Colombo with Kandy.

== History ==
Commonly known as the Kandy Road, the A1 was the first modern highway in the island. Construction began in 1820 under the orders of the British Governor of Ceylon, Sir Robert Wilmot-Horton, 3rd Baronet. Construction was carried out by Captain William Francis Dawson—who died during the project—along with Major Thomas Skinner. In the memory of Captain Dawson, the Dawson Tower was erected at Kadugannawa in the Kadugannawa Pass.feffefefeefef

== Route ==
The A1 highway begins at Colombo Fort. It passes through Peliyagoda, Kelaniya, Kiribathgoda, Mahara, Kadawatha, Kirillawala, Imbulgoda, Balummahara, Miriswaththa, Yakkala, Weediyawaththa, Thihariya, Nittambuwa, Pasyala, Wewaldeniya, Danovita, Warakapola, and Ambepussa. At Ambepussa, Kurunegala, Mawathagama, Weuda the A6 Highway branches off the A1, heading towards Kurunegala. The A1 continues east, passing Tholangamuwa, Udukumbura, Nelundeniya, Yattogoda, Galigamuwa, Ambanpitiya, Ranwala, Kegalle, Meepitiya, Karandupana, Molagoda, Uthuwankanda, Anwarama, Mawanella, Beligammana, Hingula, Kadugannawa, Pilimathalawa, Kiribathkumbura, and Peradeniya to reach Kandy.

== Images ==
Here are some photos of A1 Highway and notable places found along it.

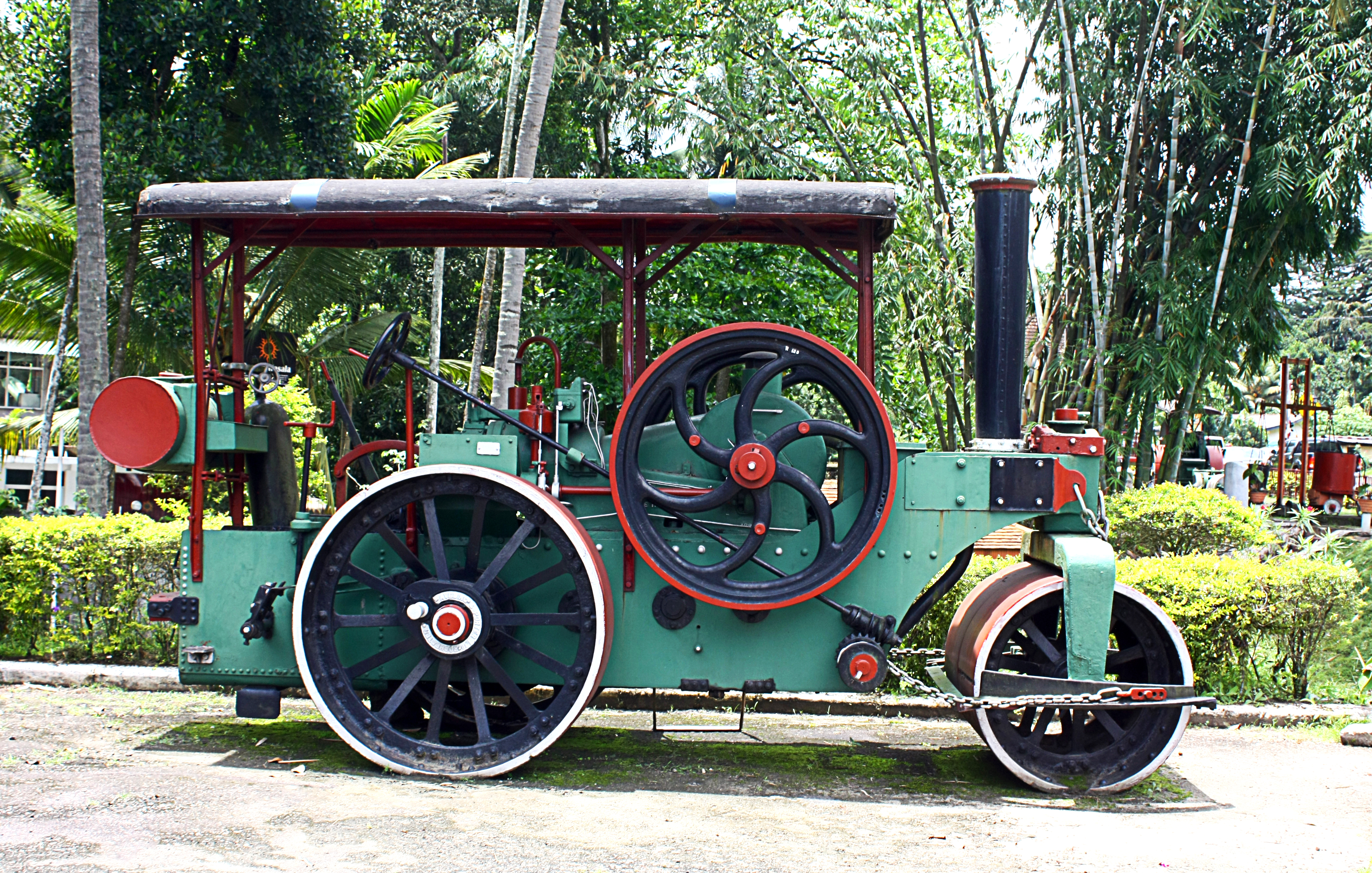
Highway museum complex at Kiribathkumbura on A1 Highway

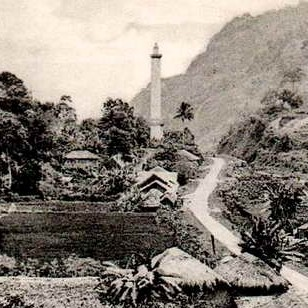
A1 road near Dawson Tower in Kadugannawa town early 1900s .

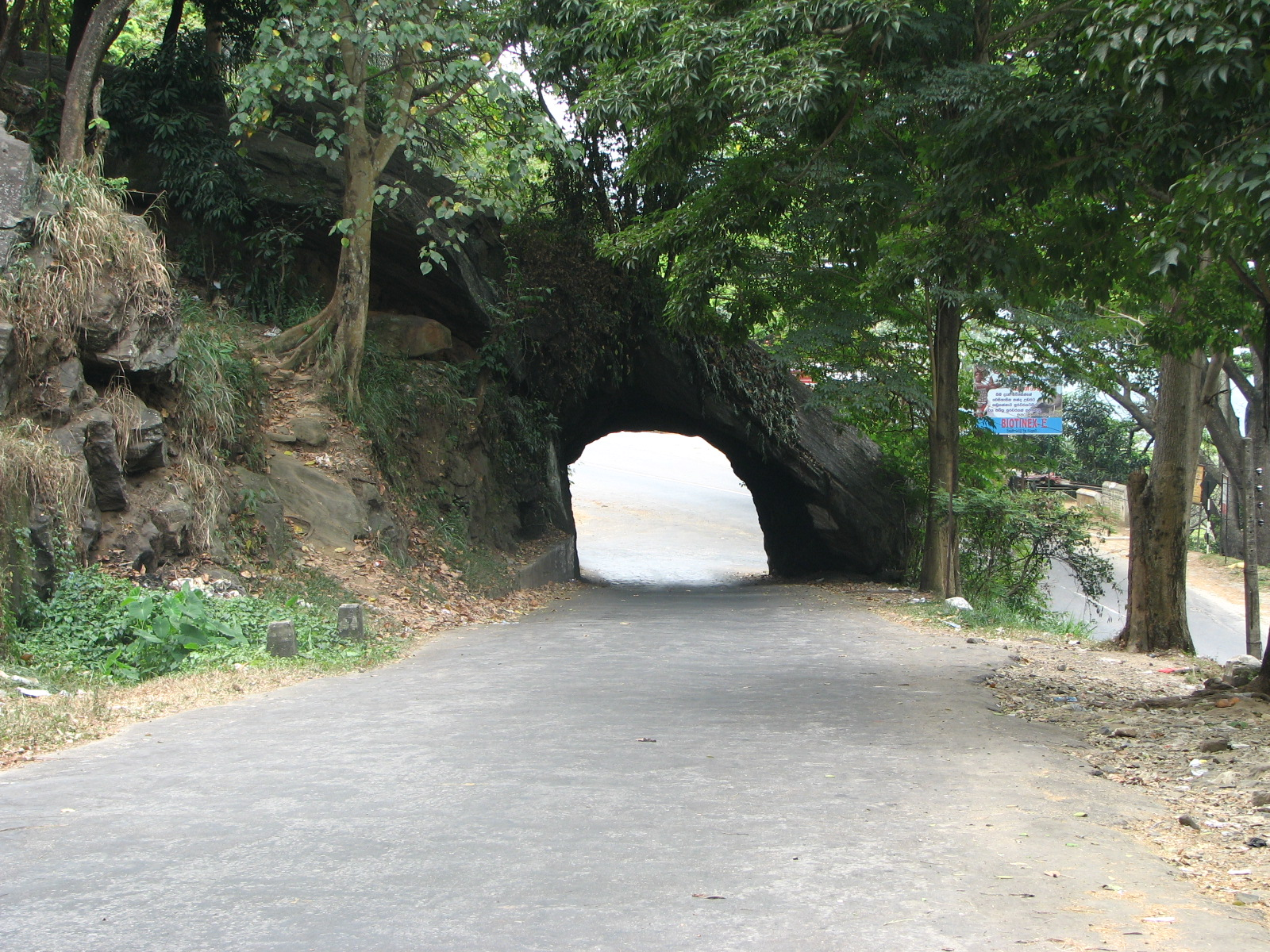
1820s rock piercing in Kadugannawa Pass.

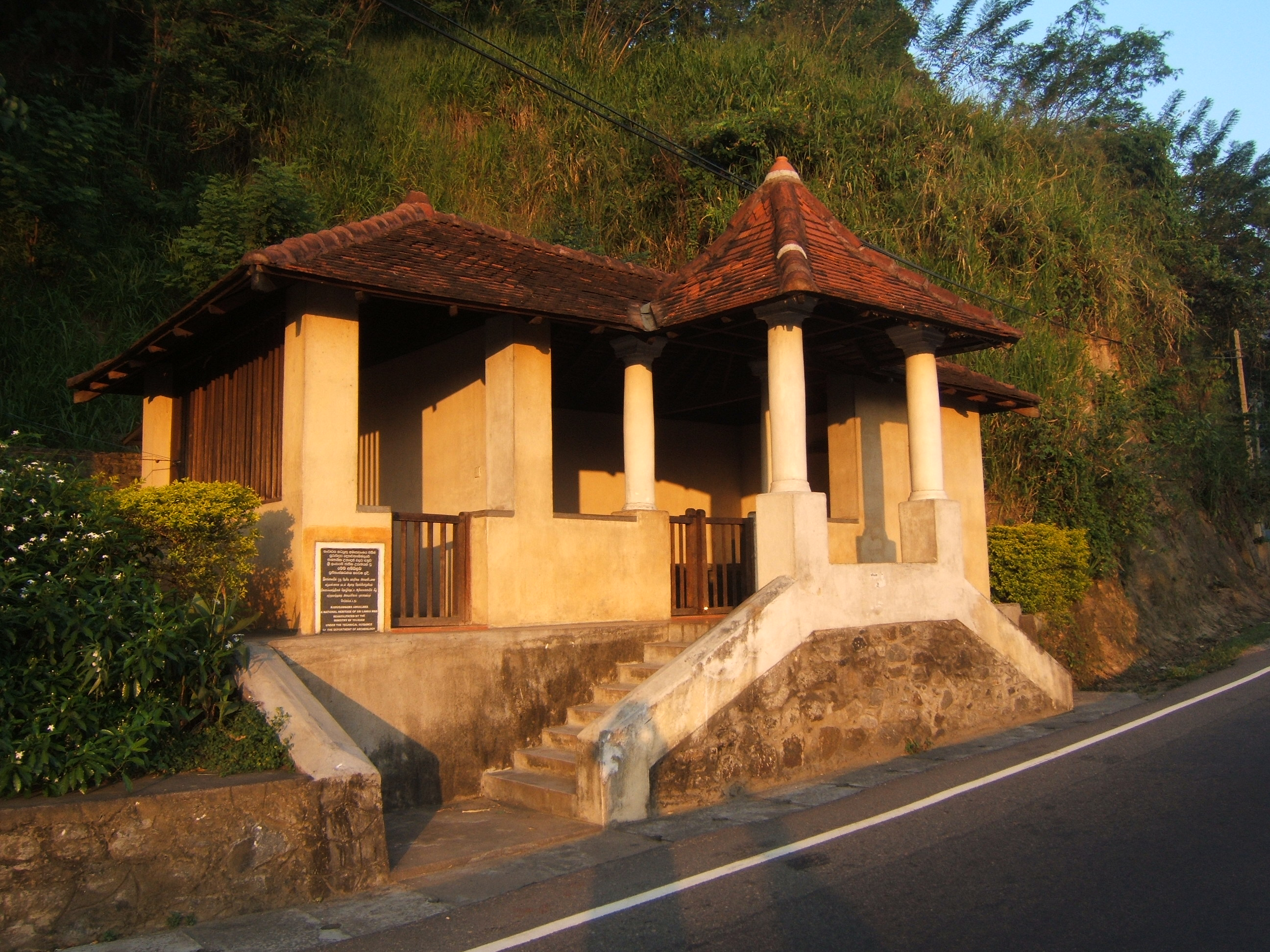
Kadugannawa Ambalama, a historic wayside rest from 18th century.
