= Danowita =

- Town
- Location within Sri Lanka
- Coordinates: 7°12′10″N 80°10′33″E
- Country: Sri Lanka
- Province: Western Province, Sri Lanka
- District: Gampaha District

Population
  - Total: 2,900
- Time zone: UTC+5:30 (SLST)
- Postal code: 11896
- Area code: 033 035 ( Some Times )

Danowita is a small town in the western province of Sri Lanka. It is 50 kilometres (31 mi) to Colombo, 59 kilometres (37 mi) to Kandy, and 45 kilometres (28 mi) to Kurunagala. The A1 highway passes by Danowita. Bandaranaike International Airport is the nearest airport.

== Nearby cities ==
- Warakapola – 4 kilometres (2.5 mi)
- Mirigama – 8 kilometres (5.0 mi)
- Pasyala – 10 kilometres (6.2 mi)
- Nittambuwa – 18 kilometres (11 mi)
- Kurunagala – 45 kilometres (28 mi)
- Colombo – 50 kilometres (31 mi)
- Kandy – 59 kilometres (37 mi)

== Demographics ==
Buddhism is the largest religion in Danowita, which contains some Buddhist temples. Hinduism and Christianity are also represented.

Ethnicity in Danowita (2006)
Population	percent
Sinhalese	91.03%
Muslim	04.98%
Tamil	02.07%
Other	01.92%

=== Language ===
The common languages of Danowita, depending on social classes, social circles, and ethnic backgrounds are Sinhalese, Tamil and English.

=== Religion ===
Notable Buddhist temples near Danowita

- Kande Viharaya
- Bothale Sri Gotabaya Rajamaha Viharaya
- Kinithulagala Aranya Senasanaya
- Waduwaththa Temple

== Economy ==
The economy of Danowita is largely driven by farming. Crops include rubber, coconut, tea, paddy, papper, pineapple, and betel.

== Climate ==
Danowita has a Tropical rainforest climate under the Köppen climate classification. The climate is fairly temperate all throughout the year with a significant rainfall . Even in the driest month there is a significant amount of rain. The driest month is January and there is about 62 mm of precipitation. Most of the precipitation in Danowita area falls in October, averaging 365 mm. The precipitation varies 303 mm between the driest month and the wettest month. April is warmest month in Danowita, with an average temperature of 28.4 °C (83.1 °F) and the December is the coldest month, with temperatures averaging 26.1 °C (79 °F). Throughout the year, temperatures vary by 2.3 °C.

Climate data for Danowita
Month	Jan	Feb	Mar	Apr	May	Jun	Jul	Aug	Sep	Oct	Nov	Dec	Year
Mean daily maximum °C (°F)	28.7 (83.7)	30.2 (86.4)	32.5 (90.5)	32.9 (91.2)	32.5 (90.5)	30.3 (86.5)	29.2 (84.6)	28.4 (83.1)	30.6 (87.1)	30.3 (86.5)	29.4 (84.9)	27.7 (81.9)	32.9 (91.2)
Daily mean °C (°F)	26.2 (79.2)	26.8 (80.2)	27.9 (82.2)	28.4 (83.1)	28.3 (82.9)	27.5 (81.5)	27.5 (81.5)	27.6 (81.7)	27.5 (81.5)	26.9 (80.4)	26.5 (79.7)	26.1 (79.0)	27.2 (81.0)
Mean daily minimum °C (°F)	22.7 (72.9)	23.8 (74.8)	23.1 (73.6)	23.2 (73.8)	25.1 (77.2)	24.8 (76.6)	24.8 (76.6)	24.8 (76.6)	24.4 (75.9)	23.6 (74.5)	22.7 (72.9)	22.2 (72.0)	21.7 (71.1)
Average precipitation mm (inches)	62 (2.4)	79 (3.1)	146 (5.7)	255 (10.0)	353 (13.9)	216 (8.5)	134 (5.3)	123 (4.8)	202 (8.0)	365 (14.4)	311 (12.2)	152 (6.0)	2,398 (94.3)
Source: CLIMATE DATA.ORG,

== Education ==
Education is free for all students who study in government schools. Schools in Danowita and the nearby area include:

=== Government schools ===
- Danowita Maha Vidyalaya
- Godawela Maha Vidyalaya
- Keenadeniya Maha Vidyalaya
- Madabawita Kanishta Vidyalya
- Bothale Kanistha Vidyalaya
- Keenadeniya Primary College

=== Private Schools ===
- Royal International College Warakapola
- Oxfard College Warakapola
- Majesty International School Warakapola

== Transportation ==
Danowita is near the A1 road, and lies on bus routes to Colombo, Galle, Hambantota, Kandy, Trincomalee, Anuradhapura, and Jaffna. More than 45 daily buses are operated from Danowita - Mirigama.

Road Transport

A-Grade highways

- A1 highway(Colombo road) which connects main cities Colombo and Kandy
- A6 highway(Kurunegala) The road is six km away and it connects with main cities Kurunegala and Trincomalee

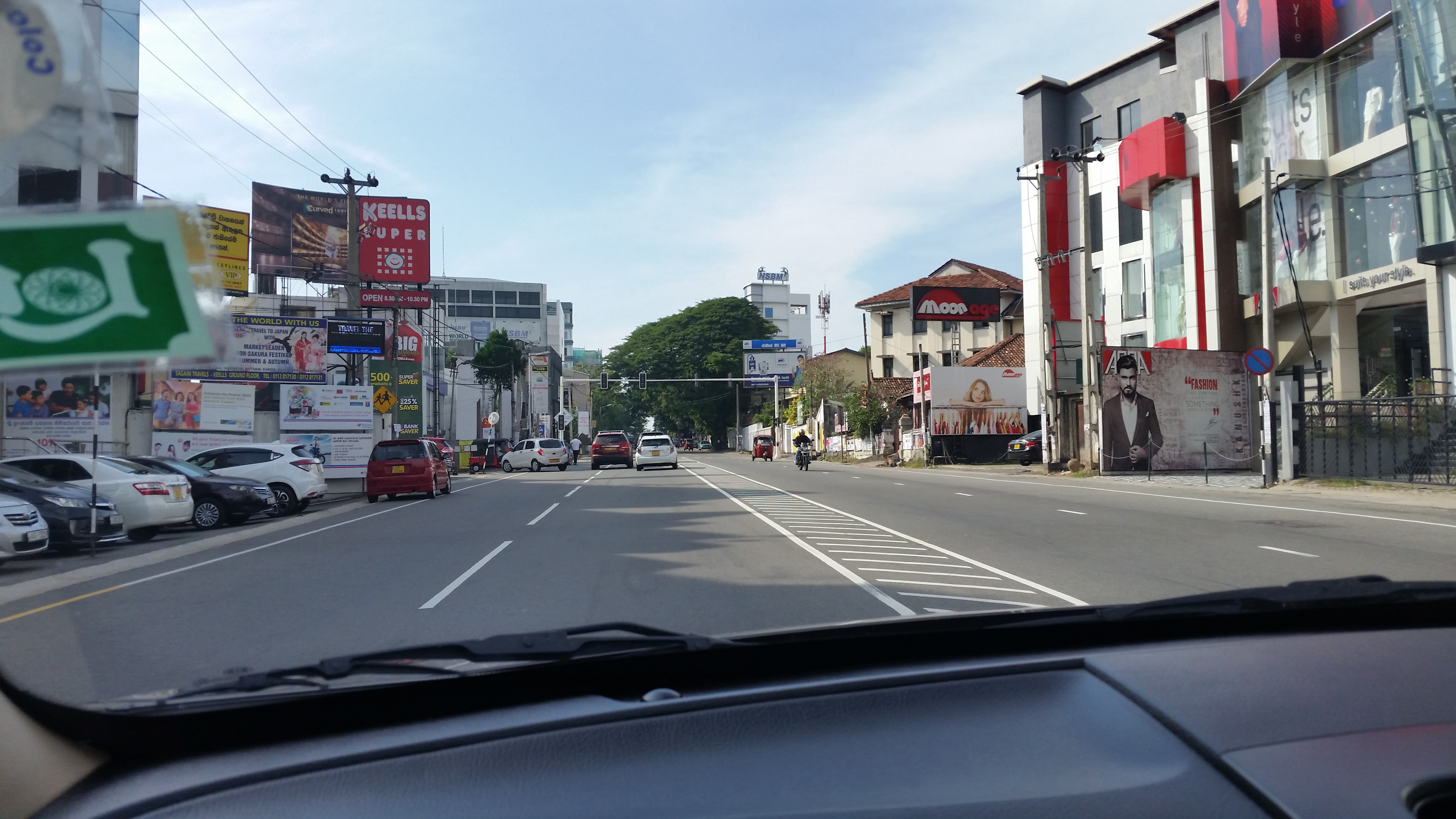
Colombo - Kandy A1

Expressways

- E04 is under construction and it is six km away

Central Expressway Construction

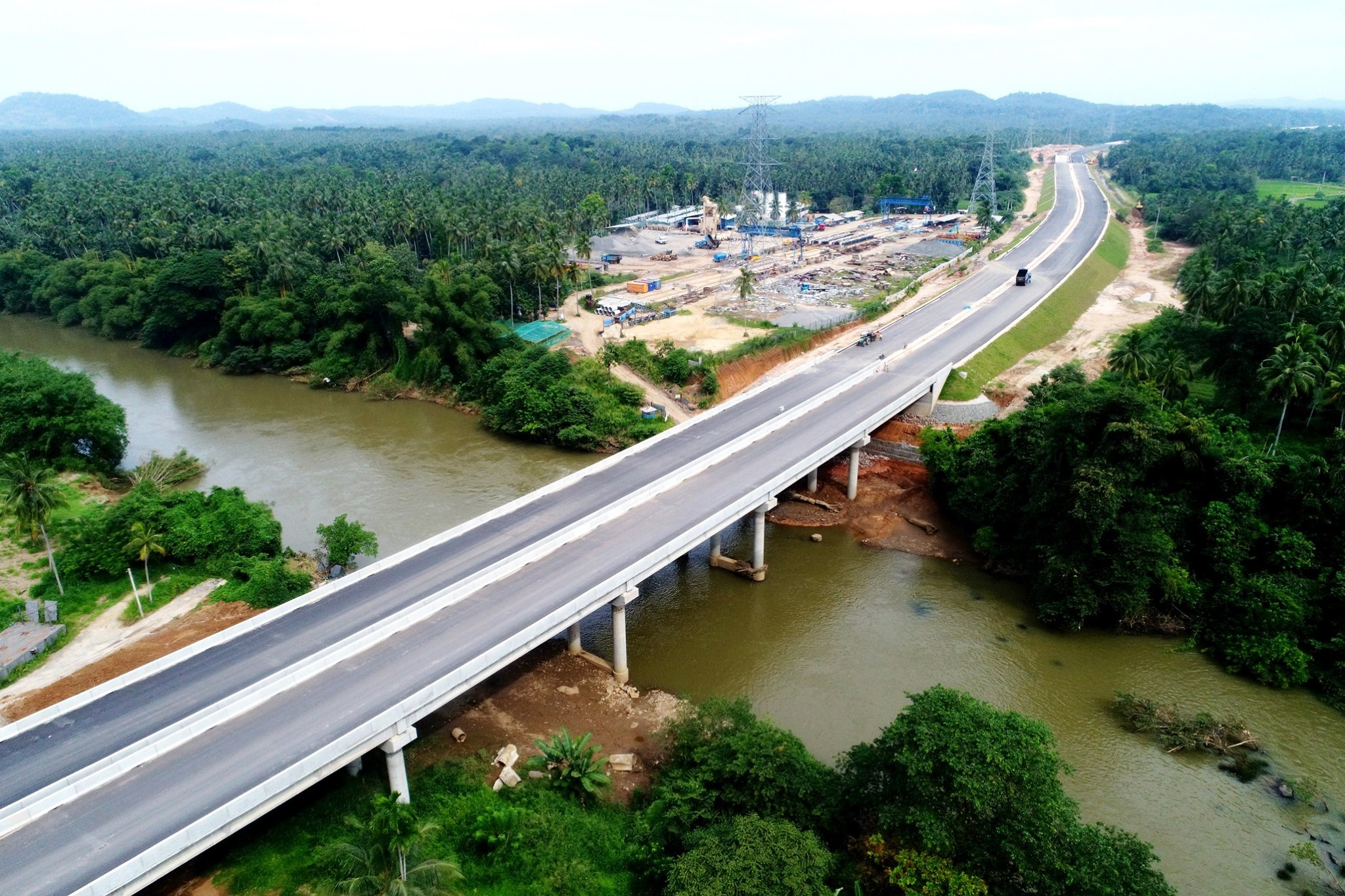
Central Expressway Construction 2019 December

Under the directives of MoHEH, RDA has initiated a study to find out a suitable road corridor to construct the expressway from Kadawatha to Dambulla via Kurunegala under Central Expressway Project. The second stage of the construction of the Central Expressway Project (CEP Project-2) from Meerigama to Kurunegala was launched on 1 February, 2017. Subsequently, the expressway will cross Gampaha, Meerigama, Kurunegala while ending at Dambulla. The project has been implemented in four stages; from Kadawatha to Mirigama (37 km), Mirigama to Kurunegala (39.28 km), Pothuhera to Galagedara (32.5 km) and Kurunegala to Dambulla (60.3 km).

Bus routes via Danowita:

- Route Number 15 – Colombo to Jaffna
- Route Number 15 – Colombo to Anuradhapura and Vavuniya
- Route Number 57 – Colombo to Anuradhapura
- Route Number 49 – Colombo to Trincomalee
- Route Number 01 – Colombo to Kandy
- Route Number 48 – Colombo to Polonnaruwa
- Route Number 08 – Colombo to Matale

Rail Transport Nearest railway station is Mirigama railway station. It is six km away from Danowita. Buses are operated from Danowita to Mirigama, So it is easy to go to the station. This station is on the main rail way line. Ambepussa railway station is also seven kilometers away.

Air Transport: The city is about 40.5 km to the Bandaranaike International Airport and 65 km to Ratmalana Airport.
