= My Cola Beverages =

Sri Lankan carbonated soft drinks manufacturing company

My Cola Beverages (Pvt) Limited is a Sri Lankan carbonated soft drinks manufacturing company and sells soft drink brands covering various types of flavours ranging from My Cola, My Lemon, My Orange, My Cream, My Soda, My Berry and My Ginger Beer. The company also sells bottled drinking water.

== Corporate history ==
My Cola Beverages initially commenced business operations under the name Pet Packaging in 1994. It stamped its mark in the industry when they introduced Sri Lanka's first bottled water under the brand Crystal in 1994. The launch of Crystal in hygienically sealed PET bottles became significant, as it was deemed as an innovative concept with the introduction of "one way pack" format. In 2004, the company ventured into the beverage industry with the launch of carbonated beverages under the flagship brand My Cola after getting necessary approval from the Board of Investment of Sri Lanka. The company also opened a factory in Kadawatha to mark the important occasion after entering the carbonated beverage industry.

The company's revenue streams through export business were severely impacted following the 2019 Easter Sunday church and hotel suicide bombings. The company endured a slight recovery in exporting products after normalcy had been returned to Sri Lanka post the bombings. In 2020, My Cola Beverages had to reconsider their business strategies catering to the export business markets in Malaysia and Singapore as the freight costs began to take a toll on their overseas market expansion. The company eventually called off their plans to export their products to Malaysia and Singapore.

In 2021, My Cola Beverages began exports to Azerbaijan and in the region covered by other landlocked countries bordering Azerbaijan. The export products also included the My Ginger Beer considering that the Ginger Beer is a non-alcoholic drink for which there had been a trend of emerging market situation in Azerbaijan and in territories located bordering Azerbaijan.

== Endorsements ==
In July 2020, My Cola Beverages signed up a sponsorship agreement with Sri Lanka Cricket for a period of three years as the official Carbonated Beverage Partner of Sri Lanka Cricket.

In 2023, My Cola Beverages also teamed up with Mercantile Services Basketball Association for the 31st edition of the Mercantile Services Basketball Association (MSBA) League Tournament. In August 2024, the company also came on board as the platinum sponsor of the 32nd Mercantile Services Basketball Association (MSBA) League Tournament.
