= Kiribathgoda =

Kiribathgoda කිරිබත්ගොඩ கிரிபத்கொடை
- Suburb
- Location within Sri Lanka
- Coordinates: 6°58′41″N 79°59′46″E
- Country: Sri Lanka
- Province: Western Province
- Time zone: UTC+5:30 (Sri Lanka Standard Time Zone)
- Postal code: 11600
- Area code: 011

Kiribathgoda (Sinhala: කිරිබත්ගොඩ, Tamil: கிரிபத்கொடை) is a suburb of Gampaha and is situated on A1 highway, between Kelaniya and Kadawatha. It is the first commercial E-Suburb in Sri Lanka. The suburb is located 12 km away from Colombo Fort centre. It is also linked to Makola by road.

Sinhalese ethnicity is the largest demographic in Kiribathgoda with a majority of Sinhalese belonging to Buddhism, and a significant minority belonging to Christianity (majority; Catholicism). There are a multitudinous number of Buddhist temples spread throughout Kiribathgoda and a Catholic church in the outskirts of Kiribathgoda.

== Education ==
The University of Kelaniya is one of the main state universities of Sri Lanka is situated just near the Kiribathgoda city. There are a number of schools in the Kiribathgoda town, such as Viharamahadevi Balika Vidyalaya, Ramasinghe Vidyalaya, and the Eureka International School.
