= Highway museum complex, Kiribathkumbura =

Highway Museum complex
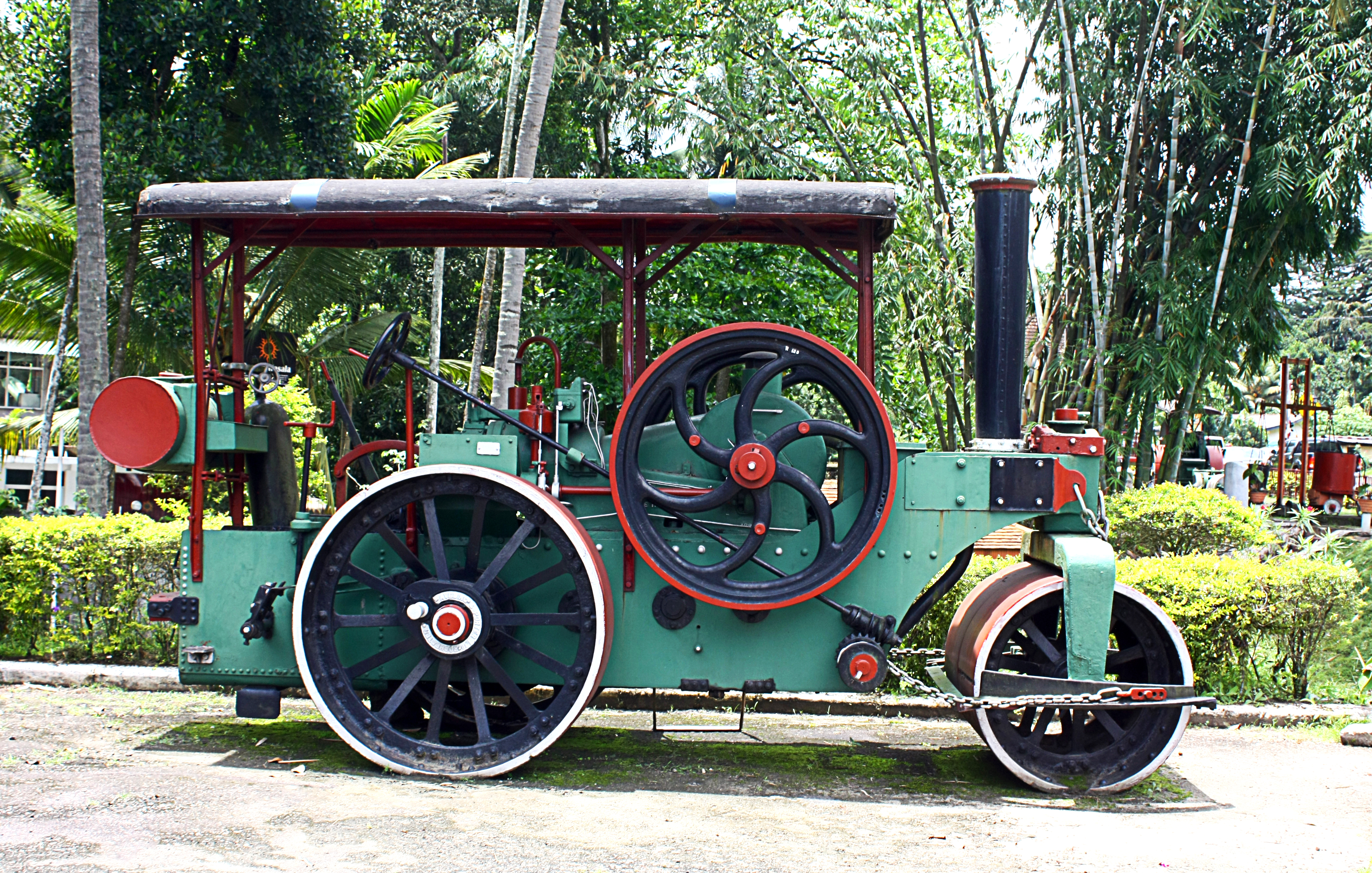
- Steamroller at Highway museum complex
- Established: 1986
- Location: Kiribathkumbura, Kandy, Sri Lanka
- Coordinates: 7°16′N 80°35′E
- Type: Highway history

Highway museum complex is Sri Lanka's first highway museum. Located in Kiribathkumbura, Kandy, it is maintained by the Road Development Authority.

The museum has a collection of former construction equipment such as stone road rollers, steam road rollers, oil road rollers, tar boilers, coal scales, road signs and a model of the Bogoda Wooden Bridge. Some of the equipment on display is reportedly over 175 years old.

== Opening hours ==
There are no entrance fees for visitors and no time limits, since the museum is situated in an open space area alongside the A1 highway.

== See also ==
- List of museums in Sri Lanka
