= List of rail accidents in Sri Lanka =

This list of railway accidents in Sri Lanka provides details of significant railway crashes in Sri Lanka involving railway rolling stock.

Other than these, a number of accidents have taken place. One major type is elephant accidents, which typically occur in the North-Central area. Other accidents occur at unsecured level crossings with road traffic.

== Worst disasters ==
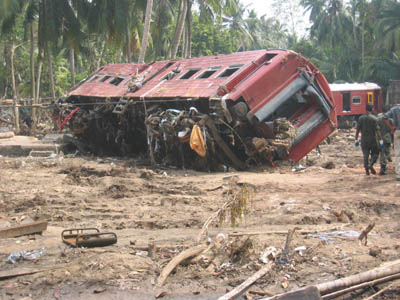
Tsunami rail disaster at Peraliya in Hikkaduwa

The worst disaster was the 2004 Sri Lanka tsunami-rail disaster at Peraliya in Hikkaduwa, with more than 1700 people killed by a tsunami following the 2004 Indian Ocean earthquake.

== 1900s ==
- 12 March 1928 – A passenger train and a mixed train collided near Kalutara killing 28 people.
- 23 May 1958 – A night mail train derailed at Batticaloa, killing three and injuring several others.
- 18 March 1964 – Sixty people died in a derailment at Mirigama.
- 19 January 1985 – Eleven passengers were killed by an LTTE bomb on a Yal Devi train.
- October 1985 – A freight train from Trincomalee to Colombo was bombed by LTTE. A Class M2 No. 571 locomotive was destroyed.
- 24 July 1996 – Seventy people died after a train was bombed by LTTE at Dehiwala.
- 4 December 1996 – LTTE attacked another train on the Trincomalee Line. Class M6 No. 798 locomotive was destroyed in this incident.

== 2000s ==
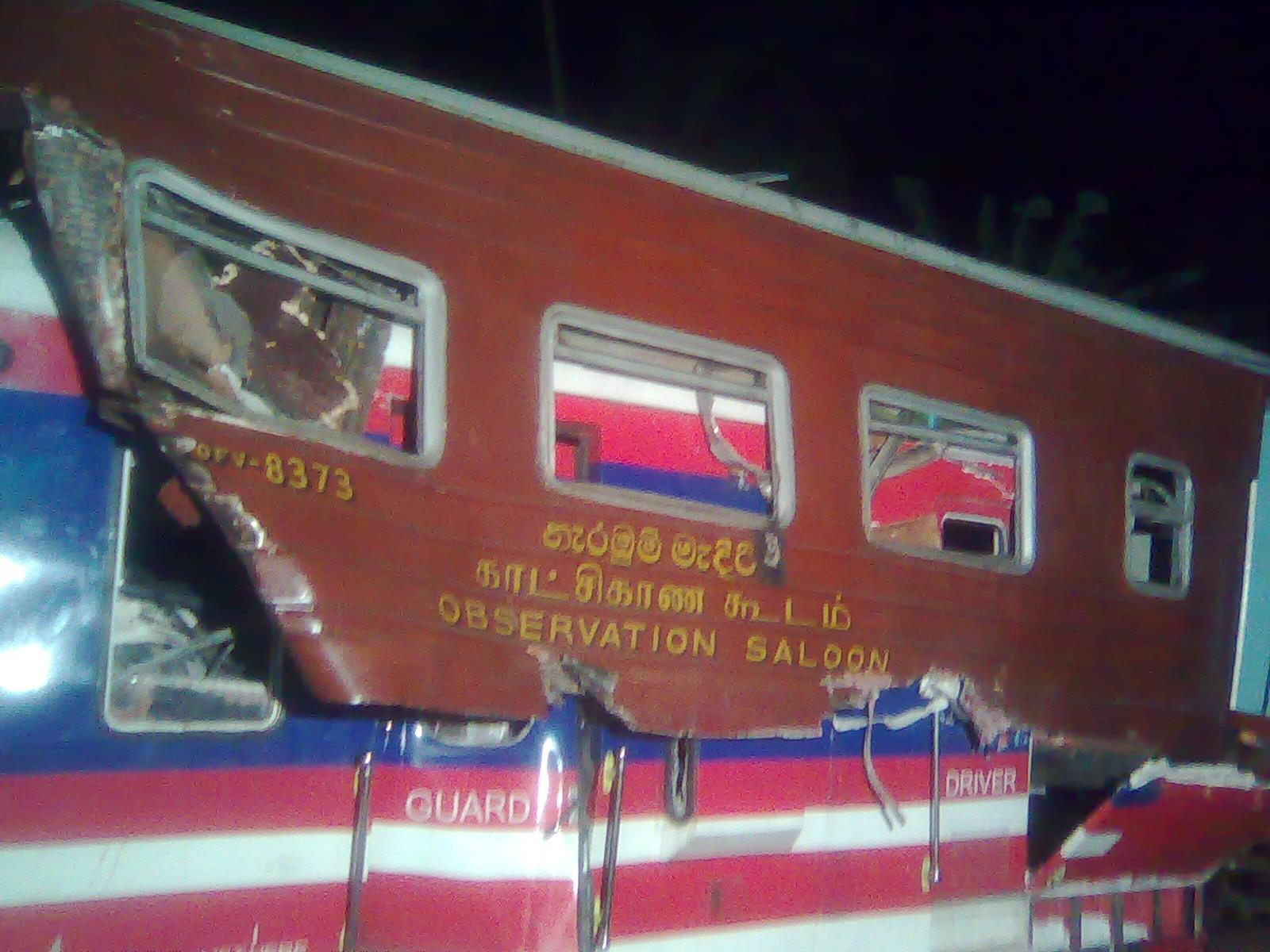
Alawwa train crash

- 19 August 2001 – A train derailed due to high speed and overcrowding, killing 46 people, between Alawwa and Rambukkana.
- January 2002 – The Intercity Express heading to Colombo from Kandy derails near Rambukkana causing more than 15 deaths. The derailment was due to malfunctioning of the braking system.
- 13 June 2002 – A train derailed while coming into Alawwa railway station, killing 14 people.
- 26 December 2004 – 2004 tsunami rail disaster. At Peraliya, approximately 2685 died in the world's biggest rail disaster as a train is overwhelmed by the tsunami created by the 2004 Indian Ocean earthquake.
- 26 April 2005 – Polgahawela level crossing collision, a private bus driver tries to overtake another bus and the train at a level crossing in Yangalmodara close to Polgahawela crashed. Thirty-seven people died, all on the bus.
- 17 September 2011 – 2011 Alawwa rail accident, near Alawwa railway station, two trains (intercity express train no 1029 Colombo to Kandy and a Class S11 DMU) collided killing five people and injuring over 30 people.
- 17 May 2012 – Two trains collided between the Wandurawa and Keenawala railway stations in Veyangoda.
- 30 April 2014 – An Intercity Express train to north and the Colombo bound Rajarata Rajina train collided at Pothuhera, injuring 68 passengers.
- 5 February 2018 - A train travelling between Colombo and Galle collided with a truck at Angulana, killing four people and seriously injuring two others.
- 28 August 2019 - Two trains travelling between Colombo Fort and Maradana stations (Fort-Chilaw) and (Maradana-Kalutara) collided head on at around 10:20 AM, with no injuries.
- 1 February 2022 - A family of four was killed when their vehicle collided with Rajarata Rajina at Rillamba Junction in Boossa.

== See also ==
- Locomotives of Sri Lanka Railways
- Sri Lanka Railways
