= Mawaramandiya =

- Village
- Interactive map of Mawaramandiya
- Country: Sri Lanka
- Province: Western Province
- District: Gampaha District
- Divisional Secretariat Division: Biyagama
- Elevation: 39 m (128 ft)
- Time zone: UTC+5:30 (SLST)
- Postal Code: 11658

Mawaramandiya is a village situated in the Gampaha District of the Western Province, Sri Lanka.

== Geography ==
Mawaramandiya is a small village located within the Gampaha District, which is part of Sri Lanka's densely populated Western Province. It lies specifically within the Biyagama Divisional Secretariat Division The village is located approximately 39 meters (128 feet) above mean sea level.

=== Climate ===
Mawaramandiya is situated in a region of Sri Lanka that experiences a tropical climate. According to the Köppen climate classification, the area falls under the Af: Tropical rainforest climate category, characterized by high temperatures and significant precipitation throughout the year.

== Administration ==
The village is governed locally through the Gampaha District administration structure, falling under the jurisdiction of the Biyagama Divisional Secretariat for local governance and administrative purposes.

== See also ==
- Makola, Sri Lanka
- List of settlements in Western Province (Sri Lanka)
