= 2011 Alawwa rail accident =

Railway incident in Sri Lanka

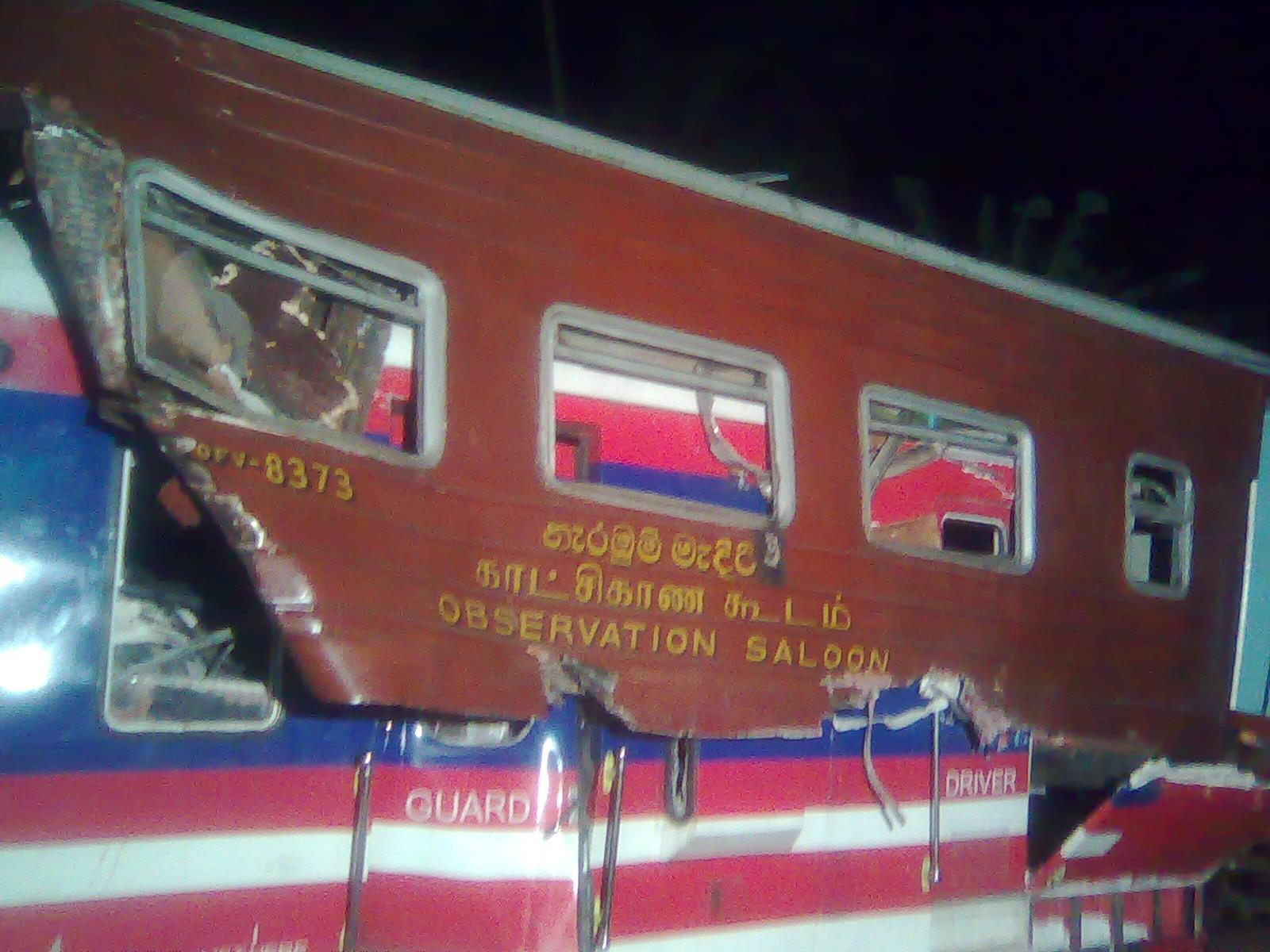

Details
- Date: 17 September 2011
- Location: Alawwa
- Coordinates: 7°17′36″N 80°14′19″E
- Country: Sri Lanka
- Operator: Sri Lanka Railways
- Incident type: Rear-end collision
- Cause: Human error

Statistics
- Trains: 2
- Deaths: 5
- Injured: 30+
- Damage: Rs.75 million

The 2011 Alawwa rail accident, occurred on the evening of Saturday 17 September 2011, when a passenger train, Sri Lanka Railways S11, drove into an observation car at the back of a stationary Intercity Express train near the Alawwa railway station, approximately 60 km (37 mi) northeast of Colombo. The accident resulted in the death of five people, including a French national, a Thai Buddhist monk and the train driver, with over 30 injured. The Intercity Express had been pushing a Rambukkana-bound train from Colombo, which had stalled near Alawwa. The accident may have been caused by human error, and the S11 train ran into the observation car at the end of the other train.

== Investigation ==
A three-member committee, comprising Nimal Dissanayake, retired Appeal Court judge, Sanath Panawella, Director Arthur C. Clarke Centre and Sarath Perera, retired Deputy Inspector General Police, undertook an inquiry into the accident in October. The Committee's conclusion was the accidents was a result of high speed and failure by the train driver to observe the rail signals. The committee recommended several solutions including re-positioning of the signal system, maintaining a proper coloured light warning system and improving communication among drivers, control room staff and station masters.

The Ministry of Transport indicated the estimated damages resulting from the train accident as being over Rs.75 million. Compensation was paid to the families of those killed, and to the injured.

== See also ==
- List of rail accidents in Sri Lanka
- List of rail accidents (2010–2019)
