= Kiribathkumbura =

- Suburb
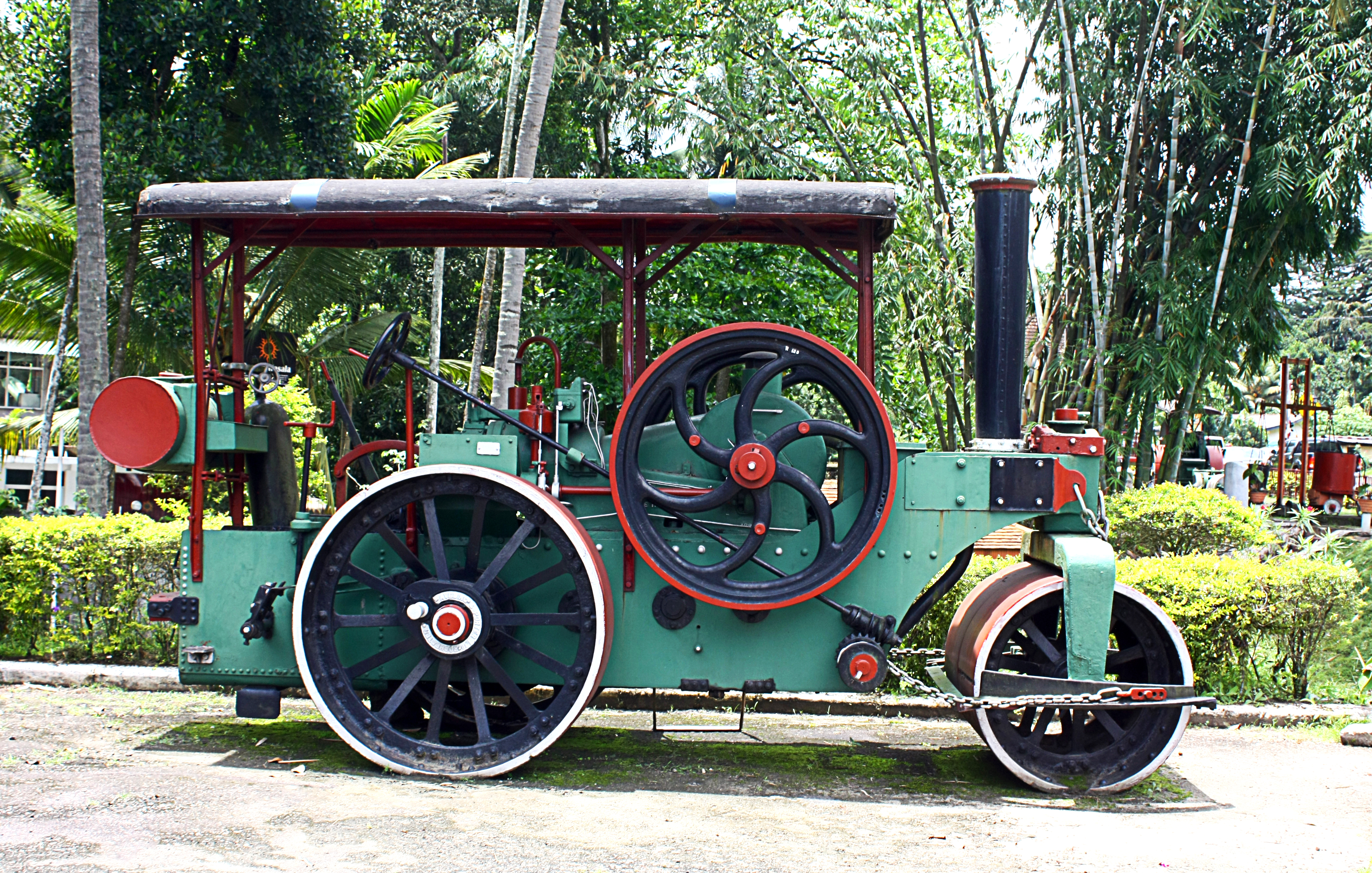
- A steamroller at the Highway Museum Complex in Kiribathkumbura
- Interactive map of Kiribathkumbura
- Coordinates: 7°16′N 80°35′E
- Country: Sri Lanka
- Province: Central Province
- District: Kandy District
- Time zone: UTC+5:30 (SLST)

Kiribathkumbura is a suburb of the city of Kandy, in the Central Province of Sri Lanka. It lies on the A1 highway, approximately 8 km (5.0 mi) from Kandy and 102 km (63 mi) from Colombo.

Just on the edge of the suburb towards Colombo is the Highway Museum Complex. The museum features British-era machinery and tools which were commonly used in road construction.

== See also ==
- Pilimathalawa
- Peradeniya
