= Polgahawela level crossing accident =

2005 railway accident in Sri Lanka

Coordinates: 07°19′05″N 80°16′41″E

The Polgahawela level crossing accident was a collision between a bus travelling from Galkiriyagama to Colombo and a train at a level crossing in Yangalmodara, near Polgahawela in Kurunegala district on 27 April 2005 at 8:30 local time, which resulted in the death of 41 people.

The bus was struck by an intercity express train from Colombo to Kandy. "The signal was green and the level-crossing gates were closed, then I saw the bus trying to cross and the next thing I know, the engine was hitting the rear of the bus," the train's driver, H. A. Sirisena, said.

"After the first impact, the bus spun around and hit the train again. I have been in this job for 41 years, and this is the first time something like this has happened." It was thought that the bus driver was racing another bus driver and competing for passengers. The bus driver, who survived with only a broken ankle, initially refused to speak about the crash to investigators.

The bus was destroyed and the wreckage caught fire, killing many people who had been thrown the tracks in front of the train, which managed to stop shortly after striking the bus. It was thought that more than 35 people were killed in the crash. All survivors from the bus sustained injuries. None of the train's passengers or crew were injured in the accident.

== Aftermath ==
The barriers on the crossing only covered the lane for oncoming traffic, allowing the bus driver to drive through on the wrong side of the road with visibility obscured further due to vegetation in area. The Sri Lankan government promised to prevent races by private bus companies, who competed for customers by advertising fast journeys, often violating traffic laws to do so. It also promised to prosecute irresponsible road users.

In April 2013, the bus driver, as well as bus conductor, M. G. Buddhika Ruwan Kumara, were sentenced to death by Kurunagala High Court, the first death sentences handed down in Sri Lanka for a road traffic offence.

== See also ==
- List of rail accidents in Sri Lanka
- List of rail accidents (2000–present)
- List of level crossing accidents
