= Kirillawala =

Kirillawala is a developing city in Sri Lanka, 22 km from Colombo city centre on Colombo-Kandy A1 motorway. An Iconic gigantic Buddha statue has been built at the nearby temple facing a junction known as the " Kandakapapu Handiya". Kirillawala-Colombo bus route number 138/1 operates from this junction. Landmarks and facilities include a traffic light system, a fuel station, well known Laknara Wedding and Conference Centre, Water Corridor Pvt Ltd (Strategic Investments & Leisure Destinations) Sathosa, People's Bank, HNB and Sampath bank ATM facilities etc.
