= Meepitiya =

- Village
- Country: Sri Lanka
- Province: Central Province
- Time zone: UTC+5:30 (Sri Lanka Standard Time)

Meepitiya is a village in Sri Lanka. It is located within Central Province near to the city of Nawalapitiya. Most of the people of this Village are Sinhalese-Buddhist. They live peacefully with the minorities.

== See also ==
- List of towns in Central Province, Sri Lanka
- Kandy
- Mathale
- Nuwaraeliya
- Gampola
- Nawalapitiya
- Dambulla
- Thalawakele
