= Delpitiya =

Coordinates: 7°08′N 80°36′E

- Village
- Interactive map of Delpitiya
- Country: Sri Lanka
- Province: Central Province
- Time zone: UTC+5:30 (Sri Lanka Standard Time)

Delpitiya is a village in Sri Lanka. It is located within Central Province.

== See also ==
- List of towns in Central Province, Sri Lanka
