= Dambadeniya Polling Division =

Dambadeniya
- Polling Division
- Coordinates: 7.362926°N 80.199527°E
- Country: Sri Lanka
- Province: North Western Province, Sri Lanka
- Electoral District: Kurunegala Electoral District

Area
  - Total: 249.75 km^{2} (96.43 sq mi)

Population (2012)
  - Total: 119,946
  - Density: 480/km^{2} (1,200/sq mi)
- ISO 3166 code: EC-15J

The Dambadeniya Polling Division is a Polling Division in the Kurunegala Electoral District, in the North Western Province, Sri Lanka.

== Presidential Election Results ==
=== Summary ===
Dambadeniya is a Bellwether for Presidential Elections, having matched the final country result 7 out of 8 times.

Year	Dambadeniya	Kurunegala Electoral District	MAE %	Sri Lanka	MAE %
2019	SLPP	SLPP	2.25%	SLPP	7.28%
2015	UPFA	UPFA	1.78%	NDF	7.41%
2010	UPFA	UPFA	1.72%	UPFA	6.59%
2005	UPFA	UPFA	2.67%	UPFA	4.49%
1999	PA	PA	1.61%	PA	0.93%
1994	PA	PA	0.50%	PA	3.50%
1988	UNP	UNP	4.63%	UNP	4.13%
1982	UNP	UNP	1.43%	UNP	2.56%
Matches/Mean MAE	7/8	7/8	2.08%	8/8	4.61%

=== 2019 Sri Lankan Presidential Election ===
Party	Dambadeniya		Kurunegala Electoral District		Sri Lanka	
Party	Votes	%	Votes	%	Votes	%
SLPP	47,006	60.31%	652,278	57.90%	6,924,255	52.25%
NDF	27,041	34.69%	416,961	37.01%	5,564,239	41.99%
NMPP	2,506	3.22%	36,178	3.21%	418,553	3.16%
Other Parties (with < 1%)	1,394	1.79%	21,193	1.88%	345,452	2.61%
Valid Votes	77,947	99.15%	1,126,610	99.25%	13,252,499	98.99%
Rejected Votes	666	0.85%	8,522	0.75%	135,452	1.01%
Total Polled	78,613	84.73%	1,135,132	85.24%	13,387,951	83.71%
Registered Electors	92,781		1,331,705		15,992,568	

=== 2015 Sri Lankan Presidential Election ===
Party	Dambadeniya		Kurunegala Electoral District		Sri Lanka	
Party	Votes	%	Votes	%	Votes	%
UPFA	41,422	55.31%	556,868	53.46%	5,768,090	47.58%
NDF	32,964	44.02%	476,602	45.76%	6,217,162	51.28%
Other Parties (with < 1%)	505	0.67%	8,154	0.78%	138,200	1.14%
Valid Votes	74,891	99.18%	1,041,624	99.12%	12,123,452	98.85%
Rejected Votes	621	0.82%	9,285	0.88%	140,925	1.15%
Total Polled	75,512	79.86%	1,050,909	78.82%	12,264,377	78.69%
Registered Electors	94,560		1,333,377		15,585,942	

=== 2010 Sri Lankan Presidential Election ===
Party	Dambadeniya		Kurunegala Electoral District		Sri Lanka	
Party	Votes	%	Votes	%	Votes	%
UPFA	44,172	64.91%	582,784	63.08%	6,015,934	57.88%
NDF	23,056	33.88%	327,594	35.46%	4,173,185	40.15%
Other Parties (with < 1%)	819	1.20%	13,515	1.46%	204,494	1.97%
Valid Votes	68,047	99.36%	923,893	99.29%	10,393,613	99.03%
Rejected Votes	436	0.64%	6,644	0.71%	101,838	0.97%
Total Polled	68,483	76.41%	930,537	75.59%	10,495,451	66.70%
Registered Electors	89,631		1,230,966		15,734,587	

=== 2005 Sri Lankan Presidential Election ===
Party	Dambadeniya		Kurunegala Electoral District		Sri Lanka	
Party	Votes	%	Votes	%	Votes	%
UPFA	37,231	54.96%	468,507	52.26%	4,887,152	50.29%
UNP	29,818	44.02%	418,809	46.72%	4,706,366	48.43%
Other Parties (with < 1%)	692	1.02%	9,181	1.02%	123,521	1.27%
Valid Votes	67,741	99.12%	896,497	99.07%	9,717,039	98.88%
Rejected Votes	599	0.88%	8,458	0.93%	109,869	1.12%
Total Polled	68,340	79.97%	904,955	77.87%	9,826,908	69.51%
Registered Electors	85,455		1,162,099		14,136,979	

=== 1999 Sri Lankan Presidential Election ===
Party	Dambadeniya		Kurunegala Electoral District		Sri Lanka	
Party	Votes	%	Votes	%	Votes	%
PA	30,403	52.54%	377,483	50.77%	4,312,157	51.12%
UNP	24,457	42.26%	326,327	43.89%	3,602,748	42.71%
JVP	2,158	3.73%	27,354	3.68%	343,927	4.08%
Other Parties (with < 1%)	849	1.47%	12,355	1.66%	176,679	2.09%
Valid Votes	57,867	98.16%	743,519	97.99%	8,435,754	97.69%
Rejected Votes	1,082	1.84%	15,272	2.01%	199,536	2.31%
Total Polled	58,949	77.70%	758,791	75.83%	8,635,290	72.17%
Registered Electors	75,865		1,000,624		11,965,536	

=== 1994 Sri Lankan Presidential Election ===
Party	Dambadeniya		Kurunegala Electoral District		Sri Lanka	
Party	Votes	%	Votes	%	Votes	%
PA	30,516	58.90%	403,838	59.36%	4,709,205	62.28%
UNP	20,613	39.79%	266,740	39.21%	2,715,283	35.91%
Other Parties (with < 1%)	677	1.31%	9,766	1.44%	137,040	1.81%
Valid Votes	51,806	98.60%	680,344	98.48%	7,561,526	98.03%
Rejected Votes	738	1.40%	10,511	1.52%	151,706	1.97%
Total Polled	52,544	76.08%	690,855	76.97%	7,713,232	69.12%
Registered Electors	69,064		897,539		11,158,880	

=== 1988 Sri Lankan Presidential Election ===
Party	Dambadeniya		Kurunegala Electoral District		Sri Lanka	
Party	Votes	%	Votes	%	Votes	%
UNP	21,532	56.13%	198,662	51.12%	2,569,199	50.43%
SLFP	16,301	42.49%	182,220	46.89%	2,289,857	44.95%
SLMP	531	1.38%	7,717	1.99%	235,701	4.63%
Valid Votes	38,364	98.89%	388,599	98.91%	5,094,754	98.24%
Rejected Votes	430	1.11%	4,281	1.09%	91,499	1.76%
Total Polled	38,794	60.73%	392,880	53.49%	5,186,256	55.87%
Registered Electors	63,877		734,453		9,283,143	

=== 1982 Sri Lankan Presidential Election ===
Party	Dambadeniya		Kurunegala Electoral District		Sri Lanka	
Party	Votes	%	Votes	%	Votes	%
UNP	28,872	57.16%	345,769	55.77%	3,450,815	52.93%
SLFP	19,429	38.46%	248,479	40.08%	2,546,348	39.05%
JVP	1,897	3.76%	21,835	3.52%	273,428	4.19%
Other Parties (with < 1%)	314	0.62%	3,895	0.63%	249,460	3.83%
Valid Votes	50,512	99.31%	619,978	99.13%	6,520,156	98.78%
Rejected Votes	350	0.69%	5,431	0.87%	80,470	1.22%
Total Polled	50,862	86.40%	625,409	86.00%	6,600,626	80.15%
Registered Electors	58,869		727,202		8,235,358	

== Parliamentary Election Results ==
=== Summary ===
The winner of Dambadeniya has matched the final country result 6 out of 7 times. Hence, Dambadeniya is typically used as a Bellwether for Parliamentary Elections.

Year	Dambadeniya	Kurunegala Electoral District	MAE %	Sri Lanka	MAE %
2015	UPFA	UPFA	1.32%	UNP	4.08%
2010	UPFA	UPFA	2.11%	UPFA	3.69%
2004	UPFA	UPFA	1.45%	UPFA	4.57%
2001	UNP	UNP	1.03%	UNP	3.00%
2000	PA	PA	0.56%	PA	2.72%
1994	PA	PA	0.31%	PA	2.85%
1989	UNP	UNP	3.76%	UNP	6.02%
Matches/Mean MAE	6/7	6/7	1.51%	7/7	3.85%

=== 2015 Sri Lankan Parliamentary Election ===
Party	Dambadeniya		Kurunegala Electoral District		Sri Lanka	
Party	Votes	%	Votes	%	Votes	%
UPFA	34,939	50.51%	474,124	49.29%	4,732,664	42.48%
UNP	30,671	44.34%	441,275	45.87%	5,098,916	45.77%
JVP	3,236	4.68%	41,077	4.27%	544,154	4.88%
Other Parties (with < 1%)	324	0.47%	5,496	0.57%	83,041	0.75%
Valid Votes	69,170	96.79%	961,972	95.39%	11,140,333	95.35%
Rejected Votes	2,260	3.16%	46,036	4.56%	516,926	4.42%
Total Polled	71,462	75.57%	1,008,459	79.63%	11,684,111	77.66%
Registered Electors	94,560		1,266,443		15,044,490	

=== 2010 Sri Lankan Parliamentary Election ===
Party	Dambadeniya		Kurunegala Electoral District		Sri Lanka	
Party	Votes	%	Votes	%	Votes	%
UPFA	34,447	66.17%	429,316	63.91%	4,846,388	60.38%
UNP	15,483	29.74%	213,713	31.81%	2,357,057	29.37%
DNA	2,015	3.87%	26,440	3.94%	441,251	5.50%
Other Parties (with < 1%)	116	0.22%	2,288	0.34%	34,779	0.43%
Valid Votes	52,061	94.43%	671,757	92.58%	8,026,322	96.03%
Rejected Votes	3,003	5.45%	53,130	7.32%	581,465	6.96%
Total Polled	55,133	61.51%	725,566	59.08%	8,358,246	59.29%
Registered Electors	89,631		1,228,044		14,097,690	

=== 2004 Sri Lankan Parliamentary Election ===
Party	Dambadeniya		Kurunegala Electoral District		Sri Lanka	
Party	Votes	%	Votes	%	Votes	%
UPFA	31,740	53.00%	412,157	51.95%	4,223,126	45.70%
UNP	24,528	40.96%	340,768	42.95%	3,486,792	37.73%
JHU	3,422	5.71%	37,459	4.72%	552,723	5.98%
Other Parties (with < 1%)	200	0.33%	2,976	0.38%	64,640	0.70%
Valid Votes	59,890	95.76%	793,360	95.14%	9,241,931	94.52%
Rejected Votes	2,641	4.22%	40,261	4.83%	534,452	5.47%
Total Polled	62,543	75.13%	833,908	76.54%	9,777,821	75.74%
Registered Electors	83,250		1,089,482		12,909,631	

=== 2001 Sri Lankan Parliamentary Election ===
Party	Dambadeniya		Kurunegala Electoral District		Sri Lanka	
Party	Votes	%	Votes	%	Votes	%
UNP	29,321	47.29%	382,768	48.59%	4,086,026	45.62%
PA	26,714	43.09%	332,775	42.24%	3,330,815	37.19%
JVP	5,349	8.63%	63,652	8.08%	815,353	9.10%
Other Parties (with < 1%)	612	0.99%	8,533	1.08%	133,770	1.49%
Valid Votes	61,996	96.29%	787,728	95.35%	8,955,844	94.77%
Rejected Votes	2,386	3.71%	38,451	4.65%	494,009	5.23%
Total Polled	64,382	79.66%	826,179	78.98%	9,449,878	76.03%
Registered Electors	80,821		1,046,102		12,428,762	

=== 2000 Sri Lankan Parliamentary Election ===
Party	Dambadeniya		Kurunegala Electoral District		Sri Lanka	
Party	Votes	%	Votes	%	Votes	%
PA	28,865	48.64%	358,794	48.75%	3,899,329	45.33%
UNP	25,527	43.02%	308,106	41.86%	3,451,765	40.12%
JVP	3,418	5.76%	40,780	5.54%	518,725	6.03%
Other Parties (with < 1%)	1,534	2.58%	28,348	3.85%	407,107	4.73%
Valid Votes	59,344	N/A	736,028	N/A	8,602,617	N/A

=== 1994 Sri Lankan Parliamentary Election ===
Party	Dambadeniya		Kurunegala Electoral District		Sri Lanka	
Party	Votes	%	Votes	%	Votes	%
PA	28,551	51.67%	366,856	51.87%	3,887,805	48.94%
UNP	26,223	47.46%	332,547	47.02%	3,498,370	44.04%
Other Parties (with < 1%)	481	0.87%	7,876	1.11%	158,616	2.00%
Valid Votes	55,255	96.48%	707,279	95.92%	7,943,688	95.20%
Rejected Votes	2,013	3.52%	30,071	4.08%	400,395	4.80%
Total Polled	57,268	82.92%	737,350	82.15%	8,344,095	74.75%
Registered Electors	69,064		897,580		11,163,064	

=== 1989 Sri Lankan Parliamentary Election ===
Party	Dambadeniya		Kurunegala Electoral District		Sri Lanka	
Party	Votes	%	Votes	%	Votes	%
UNP	28,242	62.31%	314,724	58.51%	2,838,005	50.71%
SLFP	14,595	32.20%	195,526	36.35%	1,785,369	31.90%
USA	1,305	2.88%	11,059	2.06%	141,983	2.54%
ELJP	994	2.19%	13,759	2.56%	67,723	1.21%
Other Parties (with < 1%)	188	0.41%	2,848	0.53%	90,480	1.62%
Valid Votes	45,324	94.23%	537,916	94.02%	5,596,468	93.87%
Rejected Votes	2,777	5.77%	34,212	5.98%	365,563	6.13%
Total Polled	48,101	76.32%	572,128	72.88%	5,962,031	63.60%
Registered Electors	63,024		784,991		9,374,164	

== Demographics ==
=== Ethnicity ===
The Dambadeniya Polling Division has a Sinhalese majority (96.6%) . In comparison, the Kurunegala Electoral District (which contains the Dambadeniya Polling Division) has a Sinhalese majority (91.4%)

Ethnicity in Dambadeniya
1. Sinhalese (96.6%)
2. Moor (2.80%)
3. Other (0.60%)

=== Religion ===
The Dambadeniya Polling Division has a Buddhist majority (95.7%) . In comparison, the Kurunegala Electoral District (which contains the Dambadeniya Polling Division) has a Buddhist majority (88.5%)

Religion in Dambadeniya
1. Buddhist (95.7%)
2. Muslim (2.90%)
3. Other (1.40%)
