= Dunagaha =

- Town
- Location within Sri Lanka
- Coordinates: 7°14′32″N 79°58′7″E
- Country: Sri Lanka
- Province: Western
- District: Gampaha
- Postal Code: 11264
- Elevation: 28 m (92 ft)

Population
  - Total: 5,000
- Time zone: UTC+5:30 ({{{timezone}}}Sri Lanka Standard Time Zone)

Dunagaha (Sinhala: දූනගහ) is a village in Gampaha District of Sri Lanka, with lush green surroundings. It is situated approximately 14 km (8.7 mi) away from Gampaha, 15 km (9.3 mi) from Negombo and in close proximity to suburban areas of Minuwangoda. Paddy, betel and coconut cultivation had been the main source of income for many families for decades.
