= Urapola =

- Village
- Interactive map of Urapola
- Coordinates: 7°15′46″N 80°32′20″E
- Country: Sri Lanka
- Province: Central Province
- Time zone: UTC+5:30 (Sri Lanka Standard Time)

Urapola is a village in Sri Lanka. It is located within Central Province.

== See also ==
- List of towns in Central Province, Sri Lanka
