= Makola, Sri Lanka =

Makola
- Town
- Location within Sri Lanka
- Coordinates: 06°58′31″N 79°56′55″E
- Country: Sri Lanka
- Province: Western Province
- District: Gampaha District
- Elevation: 18.45 m (60.5 ft)

Population (2024)
  - Total: 24,579
- Time zone: UTC+05:30
- Post code: 11640

Makola is a town in the Gampaha District of Sri Lanka, located approximately 12 km (7.5 mi) southeast of the Colombo central business district. It falls within the Biyagama Divisional Secretariat, and comprises five Grama Niladharis: Makola North central; Makola North Ehala; Makola North Pahala; Makola South Ehala and Makola South Pahala. The total population of the five Grama Hiladhris is 24,579.

== Religious institutes ==
- Makola Masjidun Noorul Jamiah
- Sri Sangamiththa Aramaya
- Sapugaskanda Purana Rajamaha Viharaya
- Sri Kalyani Wanshikaramaya (Salawa Pansala)

== Education ==
- Yorkshire International College

== Transport ==
The B221 (Kiribathgoda - Sapugaskande) and B262 (Makola - Udupila) roads bisect the town.
