= Aladeniya =

Coordinates: 7°20′N 80°34′E

- Village
- Interactive map of Aladeniya
- Country: Sri Lanka
- Province: Central Province
- District: Kandy District
- Divisional secretariat: Harispattuwa Divisional Secretariat
- Time zone: UTC+5:30 (Sri Lanka Standard Time)

Aladeniya is a village located within Kandy District of Sri Lanka's Central Province. It lies 12 km (7.5 mi) north-west of Kandy on the main road to Kurunegala.

== Demographics ==
Historical population
Year	Pop.	±%
1881	220	—
1891	184	−16.4%

== See also ==
- List of towns in Central Province, Sri Lanka
