= Alawwa railway station =

Railway station in Alawwa, Sri Lanka

Alawwa Railway Station
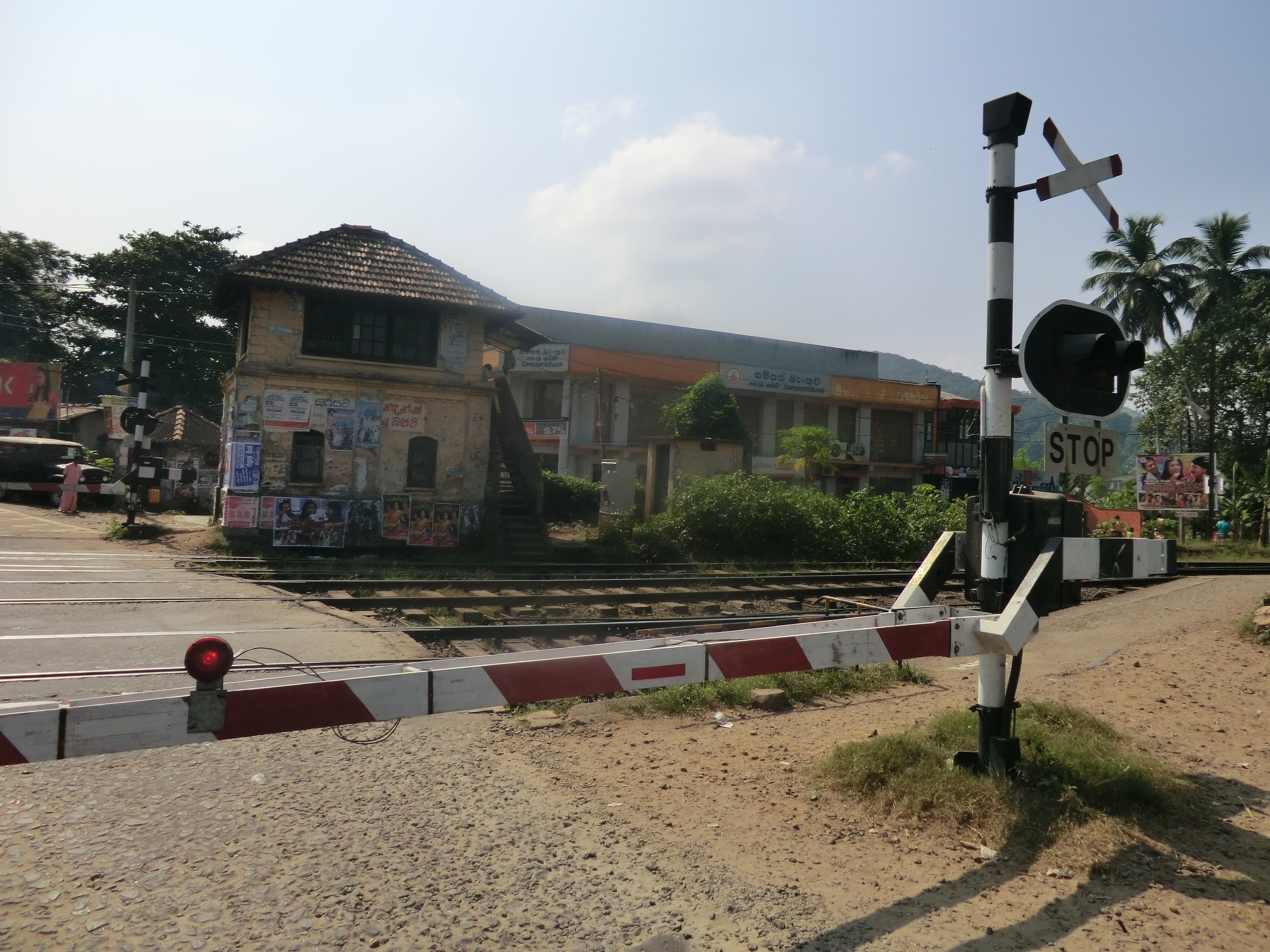
- Rail crossing at Alawwa

General information
- Location: Alawwa-Maharagama Road, Alawwa; Sri Lanka
- Coordinates: 7.2933°N 80.2386°E
- System: Sri Lankan Railway Station
- Owner: Sri Lanka Railways
- Line: Main Line
- Platforms: two

Other information
- Status: functioning
- Station code: ALW

History
- Opened: 1866
Location

Alawwa Railway Station is a railway station in the town of Alawwa, which is located in the Kurunegala District of Sri Lanka. The station is owned by Sri Lanka Railways, the state-owned railway operator, the station is part of the Main line which links Badulla with the country's capital Colombo.

The station is the 32nd station and is 66.48 km (41.31 mi) from Colombo Fort, 8.9 km (5.5 mi) from Polgahawela and situated 63 m (207 ft) above sea level. The station opened in 1866 when the Main line was extended from Ambepussa to Polgahawela.

The Alawwa rail bridge, which crosses the Maha Oya, consists of three 30.5 m (100 ft) spans on masonry abutments and piers anchored into the bedrock.

In August 2001 thirteen people died in a train derailment near Alawwa.

In September 2011 five people were killed and over thirty injured when a passenger train collided with a stationary train at the station.

== Continuity ==
Preceding station	Sri Lanka Railways	Following station
Walakumbura	Main Line	Bujjomuwa
