= Kadawatha =

Kadawatha කඩවත கடவத்தை
- Suburb
- Location within Sri Lanka
- Coordinates: 7°0′3″N 79°57′25″E
- Country: Sri Lanka
- Province: Western Province

Population
  - Total: 15,000
- Time zone: UTC+5:30 (Sri Lanka Standard Time Zone)
- Postal Code: 11850
- Area code: 011

Kadawatha (or Kadawata) (Sinhala: කඩවත Tamil: கடவத) is one of the main suburb of Gampaha, in the Western Province, Sri Lanka..

It is situated on the A1 highway, approximately 16 km (9.9 mi) away from the centre of Colombo. The distance from Kadawatha to Gampaha is approximately 14.8 km.

Kadawatha is mainly administrated by the Mahara Pradeshiya Sabha and some parts by the Biyagama Pradeshiya Sabha.

== Accessing Kadawatha ==
The Colombo-Kandy main road (A1 highway) runs through this suburb.

== See also ==
Dewalapola
