= Biyagama Polling Division =

Biyagama
- Polling Division
- Coordinates: 6.976289°N 79.977035°E
- Country: Sri Lanka
- Province: Western Province, Sri Lanka
- Electoral District: Gampaha Electoral District

Area
  - Total: 65.19 km^{2} (25.17 sq mi)

Population (2012)
  - Total: 186,585
  - Density: 2,862/km^{2} (7,410/sq mi)
- ISO 3166 code: EC-02L

The Biyagama Polling Division is a Polling Division in the Gampaha Electoral District, in the Western Province, Sri Lanka.

== Presidential Election Results ==
=== Summary ===
The winner of Biyagama has matched the final country result 7 out of 8 times. Hence, Biyagama is a Strong Bellwether for Presidential Elections.

Year	Biyagama	Gampaha Electoral District	MAE %	Sri Lanka	MAE %
2019	SLPP	SLPP	3.34%	SLPP	10.23%
2015	UPFA	NDF	0.92%	NDF	2.57%
2010	UPFA	UPFA	0.17%	UPFA	3.17%
2005	UPFA	UPFA	0.18%	UPFA	4.47%
1999	PA	PA	1.51%	PA	3.49%
1994	PA	PA	0.73%	PA	1.53%
1988	UNP	SLFP	0.66%	UNP	2.35%
1982	UNP	UNP	2.83%	UNP	2.19%
Matches/Mean MAE	7/8	7/8	1.29%	8/8	3.75%

=== 2019 Sri Lankan Presidential Election ===
Party	Biyagama		Gampaha Electoral District		Sri Lanka	
Party	Votes	%	Votes	%	Votes	%
SLPP	68,145	63.13%	855,870	59.28%	6,924,255	52.25%
NDF	33,715	31.24%	494,671	34.26%	5,564,239	41.99%
NMPP	4,188	3.88%	61,760	4.28%	418,553	3.16%
Other Parties (with < 1%)	1,890	1.75%	31,499	2.18%	345,452	2.61%
Valid Votes	107,938	99.17%	1,443,800	98.92%	13,252,499	98.99%
Rejected Votes	902	0.83%	15,751	1.08%	135,452	1.01%
Total Polled	108,840	84.76%	1,459,551	83.31%	13,387,951	83.71%
Registered Electors	128,417		1,751,892		15,992,568	

=== 2015 Sri Lankan Presidential Election ===
Party	Biyagama		Gampaha Electoral District		Sri Lanka	
Party	Votes	%	Votes	%	Votes	%
UPFA	50,173	50.46%	664,347	49.49%	5,768,090	47.58%
NDF	48,667	48.94%	669,007	49.83%	6,217,162	51.28%
Other Parties (with < 1%)	593	0.60%	9,142	0.68%	138,200	1.14%
Valid Votes	99,433	99.01%	1,342,496	98.92%	12,123,452	98.85%
Rejected Votes	997	0.99%	14,647	1.08%	140,925	1.15%
Total Polled	100,430	82.52%	1,357,143	80.77%	12,264,377	78.69%
Registered Electors	121,702		1,680,263		15,585,942	

=== 2010 Sri Lankan Presidential Election ===
Party	Biyagama		Gampaha Electoral District		Sri Lanka	
Party	Votes	%	Votes	%	Votes	%
UPFA	52,066	61.54%	718,716	61.66%	6,015,934	57.88%
NDF	31,762	37.54%	434,506	37.28%	4,173,185	40.15%
Other Parties (with < 1%)	783	0.93%	12,426	1.07%	204,494	1.97%
Valid Votes	84,611	99.26%	1,165,648	99.24%	10,393,613	99.03%
Rejected Votes	629	0.74%	8,960	0.76%	101,838	0.97%
Total Polled	85,240	79.08%	1,174,608	78.03%	10,495,451	66.70%
Registered Electors	107,786		1,505,363		15,734,587	

=== 2005 Sri Lankan Presidential Election ===
Party	Biyagama		Gampaha Electoral District		Sri Lanka	
Party	Votes	%	Votes	%	Votes	%
UPFA	43,249	55.02%	596,698	54.78%	4,887,152	50.29%
UNP	34,685	44.13%	481,764	44.23%	4,706,366	48.43%
Other Parties (with < 1%)	667	0.85%	10,815	0.99%	123,521	1.27%
Valid Votes	78,601	99.05%	1,089,277	98.94%	9,717,039	98.88%
Rejected Votes	754	0.95%	11,724	1.06%	109,869	1.12%
Total Polled	79,355	80.00%	1,101,001	79.17%	9,826,908	69.51%
Registered Electors	99,193		1,390,691		14,136,979	

=== 1999 Sri Lankan Presidential Election ===
Party	Biyagama		Gampaha Electoral District		Sri Lanka	
Party	Votes	%	Votes	%	Votes	%
PA	36,550	55.01%	532,796	56.58%	4,312,157	51.12%
UNP	26,061	39.22%	353,969	37.59%	3,602,748	42.71%
JVP	2,825	4.25%	40,472	4.30%	343,927	4.08%
Other Parties (with < 1%)	1,006	1.51%	14,382	1.53%	176,679	2.09%
Valid Votes	66,442	97.87%	941,619	97.84%	8,435,754	97.69%
Rejected Votes	1,443	2.13%	20,768	2.16%	199,536	2.31%
Total Polled	67,885	77.11%	962,387	77.12%	8,635,290	72.17%
Registered Electors	88,034		1,247,860		11,965,536	

=== 1994 Sri Lankan Presidential Election ===
Party	Biyagama		Gampaha Electoral District		Sri Lanka	
Party	Votes	%	Votes	%	Votes	%
PA	36,459	63.92%	550,654	64.74%	4,709,205	62.28%
UNP	19,678	34.50%	288,608	33.93%	2,715,283	35.91%
Other Parties (with < 1%)	903	1.58%	11,256	1.32%	137,040	1.81%
Valid Votes	57,040	98.40%	850,518	98.48%	7,561,526	98.03%
Rejected Votes	930	1.60%	13,137	1.52%	151,706	1.97%
Total Polled	57,970	71.92%	863,655	74.16%	7,713,232	69.12%
Registered Electors	80,600		1,164,625		11,158,880	

=== 1988 Sri Lankan Presidential Election ===
Party	Biyagama		Gampaha Electoral District		Sri Lanka	
Party	Votes	%	Votes	%	Votes	%
UNP	23,930	48.76%	350,092	48.08%	2,569,199	50.43%
SLFP	23,633	48.15%	355,553	48.83%	2,289,857	44.95%
SLMP	1,518	3.09%	22,467	3.09%	235,701	4.63%
Valid Votes	49,081	98.62%	728,112	98.63%	5,094,754	98.24%
Rejected Votes	685	1.38%	10,108	1.37%	91,499	1.76%
Total Polled	49,766	75.21%	738,220	74.93%	5,186,256	55.87%
Registered Electors	66,166		985,206		9,283,143	

=== 1982 Sri Lankan Presidential Election ===
Party	Biyagama		Gampaha Electoral District		Sri Lanka	
Party	Votes	%	Votes	%	Votes	%
UNP	25,398	55.67%	365,847	52.50%	3,450,815	52.93%
SLFP	18,539	40.64%	301,808	43.31%	2,546,348	39.05%
JVP	1,389	3.04%	23,701	3.40%	273,428	4.19%
Other Parties (with < 1%)	297	0.65%	5,491	0.79%	249,460	3.83%
Valid Votes	45,623	99.11%	696,847	99.15%	6,520,156	98.78%
Rejected Votes	410	0.89%	5,992	0.85%	80,470	1.22%
Total Polled	46,033	83.01%	702,839	82.70%	6,600,626	80.15%
Registered Electors	55,457		849,896		8,235,358	

== Parliamentary Election Results ==
=== Summary ===
The winner of Biyagama has matched the final country result 6 out of 7 times. Hence, Biyagama is a Strong Bellwether for Parliamentary Elections.

Year	Biyagama	Gampaha Electoral District	MAE %	Sri Lanka	MAE %
2015	UPFA	UNP	1.80%	UNP	2.25%
2010	UPFA	UPFA	1.55%	UPFA	1.26%
2004	UPFA	UPFA	3.12%	UPFA	3.00%
2001	UNP	UNP	2.21%	UNP	1.64%
2000	PA	PA	1.99%	PA	0.33%
1994	PA	PA	0.20%	PA	4.82%
1989	UNP	UNP	0.90%	UNP	4.46%
Matches/Mean MAE	6/7	7/7	1.68%	7/7	2.54%

=== 2020 Sri Lankan Parliamentary Election ===
Party	Biyagama		Gampaha Electoral District		Sri Lanka	
Party	Votes	%	Votes	%	Votes	%
SLPFA	62,301	68.25%	807,896	65.76%	6,853,693	59.09%
SJB	18,077	19.8%	285,809	23.27%	2,771,984	23.9%
JJB	4,374	4.79%	61,833	5.03%	445,958	3.84%
UNP	3,051	3.34%	28,282	2.3%	249,435	2.15%
OPPP	1,711	1.87%	21,627	1.76%	67,766	0.58%
Other Parties (with < 1%)	1,774	1.95%	23,027	1.88%	1,160,093	10.44%
Valid Votes	91,288	69.82%	1,228,474	68.78%	11,598,936	71.32%
Rejected Votes	4,946	3.78%	75,509	4.23%	744,373	4.58%
Total Polled	96,234	73.6%	1,303,983	73.01%	12,343,309	75.89%
Registered Electors	130,751		1,785,964		16,263,885	

=== 2015 Sri Lankan Parliamentary Election ===
Party	Biyagama		Gampaha Electoral District		Sri Lanka	
Party	Votes	%	Votes	%	Votes	%
UPFA	42,759	46.70%	549,958	44.96%	4,732,664	42.48%
UNP	41,232	45.03%	577,004	47.17%	5,098,916	45.77%
JVP	6,742	7.36%	87,880	7.18%	544,154	4.88%
Other Parties (with < 1%)	829	0.91%	8,332	0.68%	81,501	0.73%
Valid Votes	91,562	96.02%	1,223,174	95.51%	11,140,333	95.35%
Rejected Votes	3,737	3.92%	56,246	4.39%	516,926	4.42%
Total Polled	95,356	78.35%	1,280,647	78.21%	11,684,111	77.66%
Registered Electors	121,702		1,637,537		15,044,490	

=== 2010 Sri Lankan Parliamentary Election ===
Party	Biyagama		Gampaha Electoral District		Sri Lanka	
Party	Votes	%	Votes	%	Votes	%
UPFA	41,478	61.76%	589,476	63.40%	4,846,388	60.38%
UNP	20,438	30.43%	266,523	28.67%	2,357,057	29.37%
DNA	5,089	7.58%	69,747	7.50%	441,251	5.50%
Other Parties (with < 1%)	151	0.22%	3,985	0.43%	19,003	0.24%
Valid Votes	67,156	95.69%	929,731	94.83%	8,026,322	96.03%
Rejected Votes	2,998	4.27%	50,234	5.12%	581,465	6.96%
Total Polled	70,181	65.11%	980,467	65.06%	8,358,246	59.29%
Registered Electors	107,786		1,506,969		14,097,690	

=== 2004 Sri Lankan Parliamentary Election ===
Party	Biyagama		Gampaha Electoral District		Sri Lanka	
Party	Votes	%	Votes	%	Votes	%
UPFA	34,502	48.40%	509,963	51.52%	4,223,126	45.70%
UNP	24,696	34.65%	367,572	37.14%	3,486,792	37.73%
JHU	11,434	16.04%	102,516	10.36%	552,723	5.98%
Other Parties (with < 1%)	646	0.91%	9,691	0.98%	57,229	0.62%
Valid Votes	71,278	96.48%	989,742	95.96%	9,241,931	94.52%
Rejected Votes	2,585	3.50%	41,462	4.02%	534,452	5.47%
Total Polled	73,877	76.50%	1,031,464	77.72%	9,777,821	75.74%
Registered Electors	96,568		1,327,145		12,909,631	

=== 2001 Sri Lankan Parliamentary Election ===
Party	Biyagama		Gampaha Electoral District		Sri Lanka	
Party	Votes	%	Votes	%	Votes	%
UNP	32,882	46.07%	437,289	43.94%	4,086,026	45.62%
PA	28,778	40.32%	428,780	43.08%	3,330,815	37.19%
JVP	8,665	12.14%	113,990	11.45%	815,353	9.10%
Other Parties (with < 1%)	1,056	1.48%	15,171	1.52%	137,826	1.54%
Valid Votes	71,381	96.46%	995,230	96.30%	8,955,844	94.77%
Rejected Votes	2,617	3.54%	38,187	3.70%	494,009	5.23%
Total Polled	73,998	78.94%	1,033,417	80.36%	9,449,878	76.03%
Registered Electors	93,735		1,285,973		12,428,762	

=== 2000 Sri Lankan Parliamentary Election ===
Party	Biyagama		Gampaha Electoral District		Sri Lanka	
Party	Votes	%	Votes	%	Votes	%
PA	30,828	45.40%	470,018	48.87%	3,899,329	45.33%
UNP	27,052	39.84%	378,328	39.34%	3,451,765	40.12%
JVP	5,796	8.54%	73,110	7.60%	518,725	6.03%
NUA	2,039	3.00%	11,013	1.15%	185,593	2.16%
SU	1,539	2.27%	20,297	2.11%	127,859	1.49%
Other Parties (with < 1%)	646	0.95%	8,943	0.93%	133,530	1.55%
Valid Votes	67,900	N/A	961,709	N/A	8,602,617	N/A

=== 1994 Sri Lankan Parliamentary Election ===
Party	Biyagama		Gampaha Electoral District		Sri Lanka	
Party	Votes	%	Votes	%	Votes	%
PA	34,719	56.63%	509,030	56.79%	3,887,805	48.94%
UNP	25,537	41.66%	375,631	41.91%	3,498,370	44.04%
SLPF	1,048	1.71%	11,627	1.30%	90,078	1.13%
Valid Votes	61,304	96.27%	896,288	96.39%	7,943,688	95.20%
Rejected Votes	2,373	3.73%	33,553	3.61%	400,395	4.80%
Total Polled	63,677	79.00%	929,841	79.65%	8,344,095	74.75%
Registered Electors	80,600		1,167,469		11,163,064	

=== 1989 Sri Lankan Parliamentary Election ===
Party	Biyagama		Gampaha Electoral District		Sri Lanka	
Party	Votes	%	Votes	%	Votes	%
UNP	25,435	54.53%	385,733	54.14%	2,838,005	50.71%
SLFP	18,521	39.71%	294,490	41.34%	1,785,369	31.90%
USA	1,435	3.08%	21,665	3.04%	141,983	2.54%
ELJP	1,253	2.69%	10,549	1.48%	67,723	1.21%
Valid Votes	46,644	94.90%	712,437	95.64%	5,596,468	93.87%
Rejected Votes	2,507	5.10%	32,497	4.36%	365,563	6.13%
Total Polled	49,151	75.57%	744,934	76.82%	5,962,031	63.60%
Registered Electors	65,038		969,658		9,374,164	

== Demographics ==
=== Ethnicity ===
The Biyagama Polling Division has a Sinhalese majority (91.7%) . In comparison, the Gampaha Electoral District (which contains the Biyagama Polling Division) has a Sinhalese majority (90.5%)

Ethnicity in Biyagama
1. Sinhalese (91.7%)
2. Moor (6.50%)
3. Other (1.80%)

=== Religion ===
The Biyagama Polling Division has a Buddhist majority (86.5%) . In comparison, the Gampaha Electoral District (which contains the Biyagama Polling Division) has a Buddhist majority (71.3%) and a significant Roman Catholic population (19.5%)

Religion in Biyagama
1. Buddhist (86.5%)
2. Muslim (7.00%)
3. Roman Catholic (4.60%)
4. Other Christian (1.10%)
5. Other (0.90%)
