= Biyagama Divisional Secretariat =

- Divisional Secretariat
- Interactive map of Biyagama Divisional Secretariat
- Country: Sri Lanka
- Province: Western Province
- District: Gampaha District
- Time zone: UTC+5:30 (Sri Lanka Standard Time)

Biyagama Divisional Secretariat is a Divisional Secretariat of Gampaha District, of Western Province, Sri Lanka.

== Demography ==
Religion in Biyagama DS Division (2012)
1. Buddhist (86.5%)
2. Hindu (0.80%)
3. Muslim (7.00%)
4. Roman Catholic (4.60%)
5. Other Christian (1.10%)
6. Other (0.00%)
