= Ambepussa =

Ambepussa අඹේපුස්ස
- Town
- Location within Sri Lanka
- Coordinates: 7.2418°N 80.2112°E
- Country: Sri Lanka
- Province: Sabaragamuwa
- District: Kegalle

Area
  - Total: 4.078 km^{2} (1.575 sq mi)

Population (2015)
  - Total: 4,742
- Time zone: UTC+5:30 (Sri Lanka Standard Time)
- Sri Lanka Post: 11212
- Area code: 035

Ambepussa is a town in the Kegalle District, Sabaragamuwa Province, Sri Lanka.

== History ==
The Ambepussa railway station, was the terminus station for the first rail passenger service, a ten-carriage train which departed Colombo Fort railway station on 22 October 1865. The first train however arrived at the station on 27 December 1864.

Ambepussa is the site of the Heritage Ambepussa Hotel, previously the Ambepussa Resthouse, which is the country's oldest purpose built hostelry. Built in 1822 as the residence for the Public Works Department Executive Engineer, when the Colombo to Kandy road was being constructed. It was converted into a resthouse in 1828 and comprises a single-storey, seven room, Dutch-style bungalow with white circular columns.

The town is also known for the Government Agricultural Farm, which is located on the bank of Maha Oya.

== Geography ==
Ambepussa is 59 km (37 mi) northwest of Colombo and in the western part of the island. It is about 57 km (35 mi) east of Kandy, 34 km (21 mi) northeast of Kurunegala and 18 km (11 mi) away from Kegalle.

== Transport ==
Ambepussa is situated at the junction of the A1 (Colombo - Kandy) highway and the A6 (Ambepussa - Trincomalee) road.

Ambepussa Railway station is located 7 km (4.3 mi) to the northeast, in the Gampaha District.

=== Maps ===
- Detailed map of Ambepussa vicinity and Sri Lanka
