= A6 road (Sri Lanka) =

Road in Sri Lanka

Coordinates: 8.363523°N 81.01121°E

A6 highway

Route information
- Maintained by the Road Development Authority
- Length: 199 km (124 mi)

Major junctions
- West end: Ambepussa
- East end: Trincomalee

Location
- Country: Sri Lanka
- Major cities: Ambepussa, Kurunagala, Dambulla, Habarana, Kantale, Trincomalee

Highway system
- Roads in Sri Lanka; Expressways; A-Grade; B-Grade

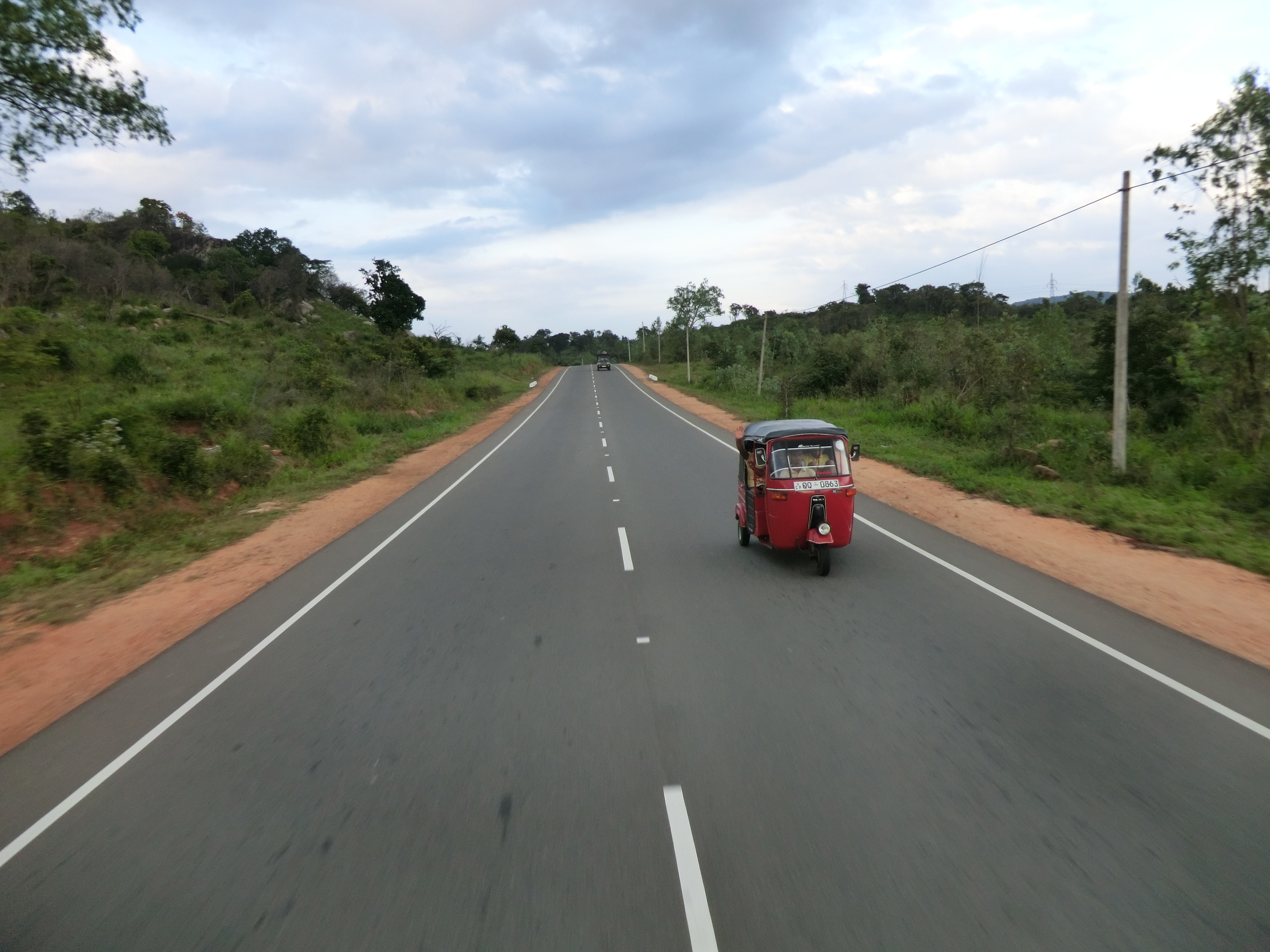
A6 highway

The A 6 road is an A-Grade trunk road in Sri Lanka. It connects Ambepussa with Trincomallee.

The A 6 passes through Alawwa, Polgahawela, Kurunegala, Ibbagamuwa, Melsiripura, Galewala, Dambulla, Habarana, Gal Oya, Alut Oya, Kantale and Thampalakamam to reach Trincomallee.
