= Mirigama Electoral District =

Electoral district of Sri Lanka

Coordinates: 7.2414°N 80.1325°E

Mirigama electoral district was an electoral district of Sri Lanka between August 1947 and February 1989. The district was named after the town of Mirigama in present-day Gampaha District, Western Province. The 1978 Constitution of Sri Lanka introduced the proportional representation electoral system for electing members of Parliament. The existing 160 mainly single-member electoral districts were replaced with 22 multi-member electoral districts. Mirigama electoral district was replaced by the Gampaha multi-member electoral district at the 1989 general elections, the first under the PR system, though Mirigama continues to be a polling division of the multi-member electoral district.

== Members of Parliament ==
Key

Independent SLFP UNP

Election	Member	Party	Term
1947	Don Stephen Senanayake	UNP	1947-1952
1952	John Amaratunga	UNP	1952-1956
1956	Vimala Wijewardene	SLFP	1956-1960
1960	A. A. E. Jayasinghe	SLFP	1960-1960
1960	Wijayabahu Wijayasinha	SLFP	1960-1965
1965	Siva Obeyesekere	SLFP	1965-1970
1970	Siva Obeyesekere	SLFP	1970-1977
1977	Mahendra S. Wijeratne	UNP	1977-1989

== Elections ==
=== 1947 Parliamentary General Election ===
Results of the 1st parliamentary election held between 23 August 1947 and 20 September 1947 for the district:

Candidate	Party	Symbol	Votes	%
Don Stephen Senanayake		Elephant	26,762	71.49%
Edmund Samarakkody	Bolshevik–Leninist Party	Lamp	10,673	28.51%
Valid Votes			37,435	100.00%
Rejected Votes			462	
Total Polled			37,897	
Registered Electors			55,474	
Turnout			68.31%	

=== 1952 Parliamentary General Election ===
Results of the 2nd parliamentary election held between 24 May 1952 and 30 May 1952 for the district:

Candidate	Party	Symbol	Votes	%
John Amaratunga		Elephant	27,447	61.06%
James Peter Obeyesekere III		Hand	17,502	38.94%
Valid Votes			44,949	100.00%
Rejected Votes			304	
Total Polled			45,253	
Registered Electors			56,728	
Turnout			79.77%	

=== 1956 Parliamentary General Election ===
Results of the 3rd parliamentary election held between 5 April 1956 and 10 April 1956 for the district:

Candidate	Party	Symbol	Votes	%
Vimala Wijewardene		Hand	36,193	75.62%
John Amaratunga		Elephant	10,896	22.76%
H. P. Jayawardane		Pair of Spectacles	399	0.83%
A. A. Stanley Dias		Pair of Scales	375	0.78%
Valid Votes			47,863	100.00%
Rejected Votes			234	
Total Polled			48,097	
Registered Electors			63,440	
Turnout			75.81%	

=== 1960 (March) Parliamentary General Election ===
Results of the 4th parliamentary election held on 19 March 1960 for the district:

Candidate	Party	Symbol	Votes	%
A. E. Jayasinghe	Sri Lanka Freedom Party	Hand	12,430	42.75%
W. D. Senanayake	United National Party	Elephant	12,304	42.32%
K. Ratnayake	Mahajana Eksath Peramuna	Cart Wheel	4,340	14.93%
Valid Votes			29,074	100.00%
Rejected Votes			189	
Total Polled			29,263	
Registered Electors			37,086	
Turnout			78.91%	

=== 1960 (July) Parliamentary General Election ===
Results of the 5th parliamentary election held on 20 July 1960 for the district:

Candidate	Party	Symbol	Votes	%
Wijayabahu Wijayasinha	Sri Lanka Freedom Party	Hand	15,424	51.45%
W. D. Senanayake	United National Party	Elephant	13,934	46.48%
E. A. Jayasinghe		Chair	345	1.15%
Tilaka Kulasekera		Cart Wheel	276	0.92%
Valid Votes			29,979	100.00%
Rejected Votes			113	
Total Polled			30,092	
Registered Electors			37,086	
Turnout			81.14%	

=== 1965 Parliamentary General Election ===
Results of the 6th parliamentary election held on 22 March 1965 for the district:

Candidate	Party	Symbol	Votes	%
Siva Obeyesekere	Sri Lanka Freedom Party	Hand	17,872	46.90%
Wijayabahu Wijayasinha	United National Party	Elephant	17,028	44.69%
K. P. P. Karunanayake		Chair	1,956	5.13%
M. K. W. Fonseka		Omnibus	1,015	2.66%
M. B. Ratnayake	Mahajana Eksath Peramuna	Cart Wheel	235	0.62%
Valid Votes			38,106	100.00%
Rejected Votes			183	
Total Polled			38,289	
Registered Electors			44,575	
Turnout			85.90%	

=== 1970 Parliamentary General Election ===
Results of the 7th parliamentary election held on 27 May 1970 for the district:

Candidate	Party	Symbol	Votes	%
Siva Obeyesekere	Sri Lanka Freedom Party	Hand	24,872	55.99%
W. S. Karunaratne	United National Party	Elephant	19,549	44.01%
Valid Votes			44,421	100.00%
Rejected Votes			135	
Total Polled			44,556	
Registered Electors			50,721	
Turnout			87.85%	

=== 1977 Parliamentary General Election ===
Results of the 8th parliamentary election held on 21 July 1977 for the district:

Candidate	Party	Symbol	Votes	%
Mahendra Wijeratne		Elephant	30,877	57.91%
J. P. Obeysekera		Hand	21,080	39.54%
Narada Jayakody		Key	1,178	2.21%
J. Jayasinghe		Lamp	180	0.34%
Valid Votes			53,315	100.00%
Rejected Votes			187	
Total Polled			53,502	
Registered Electors			60,810	
Turnout			87.98%	
