= Lakshman Kiriella =

Sri Lankan politician and lawyer

Hon. Lakshman Kiriella
- ලක්ෂ්මන් කිරිඇල්ල லக்ஸ்மன் கிரிஎல்ல
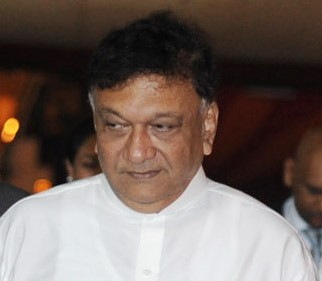
- Kiriella in March 2015

Chief Opposition Whip
- In office 20 August 2020 – 24 September 2024
- President: Gotabaya Rajapaksa; Ranil Wickremesinghe
- Prime Minister: Mahinda Rajapaksa; Ranil Wickremesinghe; Dinesh Gunawardena
- Preceded by: Gayantha Karunathilaka
- Succeeded by: Gayantha Karunathilaka

Leader of the House
- In office 20 January 2015 – 2 January 2020
- President: Maithripala Sirisena
- Prime Minister: Ranil Wickremesinghe
- Preceded by: Nimal Siripala De Silva
- Succeeded by: Dinesh Gunawardena

Minister of Public Enterprise, Kandyan Heritage & Kandy Development
- In office 25 February 2018 – 22 November 2019
- President: Maithripala Sirisena
- Prime Minister: Ranil Wickremesinghe
- Preceded by: Kabir Hashim

Minister of Higher Education and Highways
- In office 14 October 2015 – 25 February 2018
- President: Maithripala Sirisena
- Prime Minister: Ranil Wickremesinghe
- Succeeded by: Kabir Hashim

Minister of Plantation Industries
- In office 12 January 2015 – 17 August 2015
- President: Maithripala Sirisena
- Prime Minister: Ranil Wickremesinghe
- Preceded by: Mahinda Samarasinghe
- In office 12 December 2001 – 2 April 2004
- President: Chandrika Kumaratunga
- Prime Minister: Ranil Wickremesinghe

Member of Parliament for Kandy District
- In office 1989 – 24 September 2024

Personal details
- Born: 2 February 1948 (age 78)
- Party: Samagi Jana Balawegaya; United National Party
- Other political affiliations: Sri Lanka Freedom Party (1989–2001)
- Spouse: Charmaine née Jayawardena
- Children: 3 (Including Chamindrani Kiriella)
- Education: Royal College, Colombo
- Profession: Lawyer

Lakshman Bandara Kiriella (born 2 February 1948) is a Sri Lankan politician and lawyer. He is a former Member of Parliament from the Kandy District and former Leader of the House of the Parliament. He has also held office as Minister of Public Enterprises and Kandy Development and as Minister of Higher Education and Highways from 2015 to 2019.

Educated at Royal College, Colombo and Sri Lanka Law College, he became a practicing lawyer before entering politics. He has elected to Parliament in 1989, he has been a Member ever since. He has served as the Minister of Tourism and Sports and the Deputy minister of Foreign Affairs. In 2015, he was appointed as the Leader of the House of the United National Party government led by Prime Minister Ranil Wickremesinghe.

He is married to Charmaine Jayawardena and they have two daughters, Kishanee and Chamindrani Kiriella, and one son, Dinuk L. B.

In October 2018, the Asgiriya Chapter of Siam Nikaya conferred the title of Shasanamamaka Jana Prasadini on Kiriella, in recognition of his service to Buddhism and society.

== Controversies ==
=== Central Expressway Construction ===
Central expressway of Sri Lanka (E04 expressway) planned to construct in four phases to link Kadawatha to Kandy. However, the construction of phase one and phase three were delayed as Chinese and Japanese loans weren't receiving on time. Phase two of the project (Mirigama to Katugastota) funded by the Sri Lankan government and construction carrying out by local constructors. There are some allegations that phase two construction carrying out by companies attached to Kiriella. COPE decided to investigate tender procedure of central expressway project due to allegations of misappropriation of public funds. And MP. Anura Kumara Dissanayake mentioned in parliament recalling a statement by former president Maithripala Sirisena that tender procedures has been violated while offering contracts. Responding to media, minister of parliament Wimal Weerawansa blamed that former minister Kiriella and his daughter converted central expressway project into their money making venture.

=== Recruiting Political Supporters to RDA ===
Presidential Commission of Inquiry (PCoI) probing corruption in good governance (Yahapalana) government conducted inquiry on backdoor appointments given by former minister to UNP supporters. He was accused for recruiting UMP members as public liaison officers and consultants to the Road Development Authority (RDA) without conducting interviews, checking qualifications and assigning duties. Former minister denied allegations that those recruitments cost Rs. 62.87 million to government.
