= Expressways of Sri Lanka =

Expressways in Sri Lanka
Completed
Under Construction
E01 E02 E03	E04 E06 E09

System information
- Length: 311.95 km (193.84 mi)
- Formed: 27 November 2011
- Notes: Length as of 2022

Highway names
- Expressways: Expressway XX (E XX)

System links
- Roads in Sri Lanka; Expressways; A-Grade; B-Grade

Sri Lanka currently has over 271 kilometres (168 mi) of designated expressways serving the southern and central parts of the country. The first stage of the E01 Expressway (Southern Expressway), which opened in 2011 was Sri Lanka's first expressway spanning a distance of 95.3 kilometres (59.2 mi). The second stage of the Southern Expressway opened in 2014 and extends to Matara. The E03 Expressway (Colombo–Katunayake Expressway) opened in 2013 and connects Sri Lanka's largest city Colombo with the Bandaranaike International Airport covering a distance of 25.8 kilometres (16.0 mi). The newest expressway is the Port Access Elevated Highway running from New Kelani Bridge, Colombo to Athurugiriya, It is estimated to be finished in May 2025. All E-Grade highways in Sri Lanka are access-controlled, toll roads with speeds limits in the range of 80–110 kilometres per hour (50–68 mph). Pedestrians, bicycles, motorcycles, three wheelers and tractors are not permitted to enter the expressways.

ITS (Intelligent Transportation System) systems are being installed presently. ETC Electronic Toll Collection systems are being installed on the Southern Expressway while the Colombo-Katunayeke Expressway system is functional.

== Expressways of Sri Lanka ==
Number	Name	Length (km)	Length (mi)	Northern end	Southern end	Completed	Notes
E01 E01	Southern Expressway	200.45	124.55	Kottawa, Colombo	Mattala	2020	Kottawa–Galle in 2011; Galle-Matara in 2014; Matara-Hambantota in 2020.
E02 E02	Outer Circular Expressway	28.8	17.9	Kerawalapitiya	Kottawa, Colombo	2019	Kottawa–Kaduwela in 2014; Kaduwela–Kadawatha in 2015; Kadawatha-Kerawalapitiya in 2019
E03 E03	Colombo-Katunayake Expressway	25.8	16.0	Bandaranaike International Airport	New Kelani Bridge, Colombo	2013	5.3 km (3.3 mi) extension to Colombo Port City is under construction and is expected to be completed in 2022. New interchanges will be added at Ingurukade and Orugodawatta.
E04 E04	Central Expressway (Section II)	40.9	25.4	Kurunegala	Mirigama	2022	Partial project completion in 2022
E04 E04	Central Expressway (Section I, III & IV)	137.1	85.2	Dambulla	Kadawatha	—	Under construction. Stage 2 was opened in early 2022. Project completion up to Kandy in 2024
E06 E06	Magampura Expressway	16.5	10.3	Andarawewa	Hambantota	2019	Completed in 2019
E09 E09	Port Access Elevated Highway	5.3	3.3	New Kelani Bridge, Colombo	Port city	—	Under construction. Expected completion by March, 2026
	Ruwanpura Expressway	73.9	45.9	Kahathuduwa	Pelmadulla	—	Under construction. Expected completion in 2023
	NKB-Athurugiriya Elevated Highway	17.3	10.7	New Kelani Bridge, Colombo	Athurugiriya	—	Under construction. Expected completion in 2025
Proposed and unbuilt

== Gallery ==
=== Southern Expressway (E01) ===
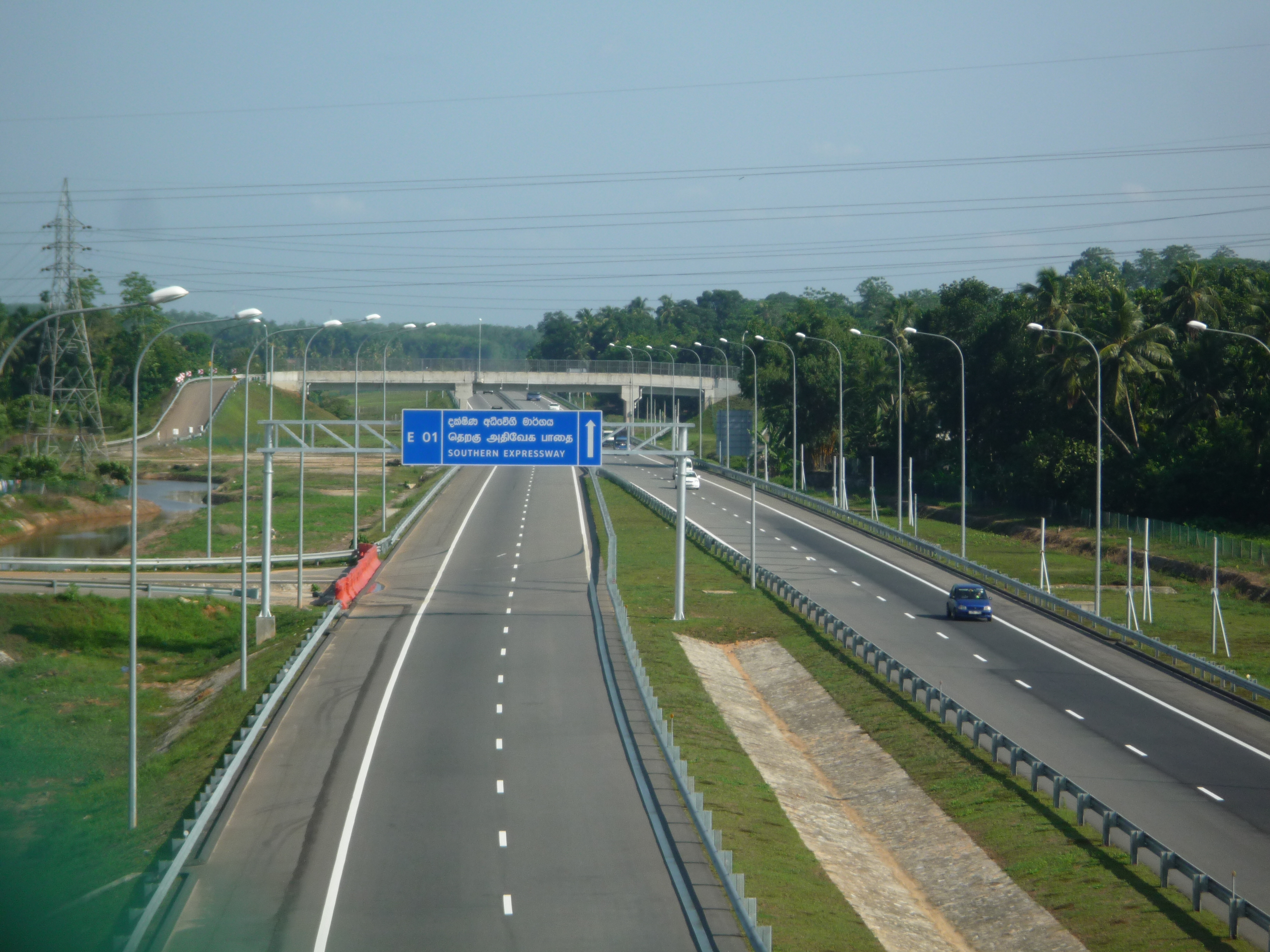
Southern Expressway (E01)

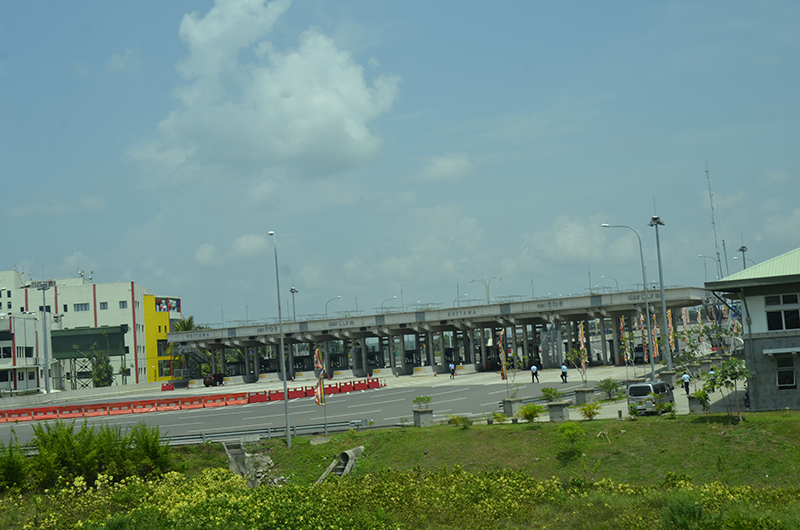
Southern Expressway toll plaza

=== Katunayake (E03) ===
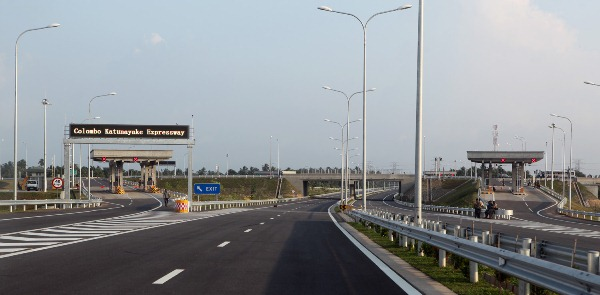
Katunayake Expressway (E03)

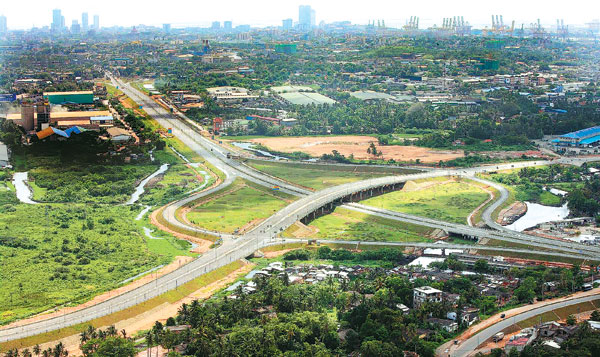
Birds-Eye Shot of CKE

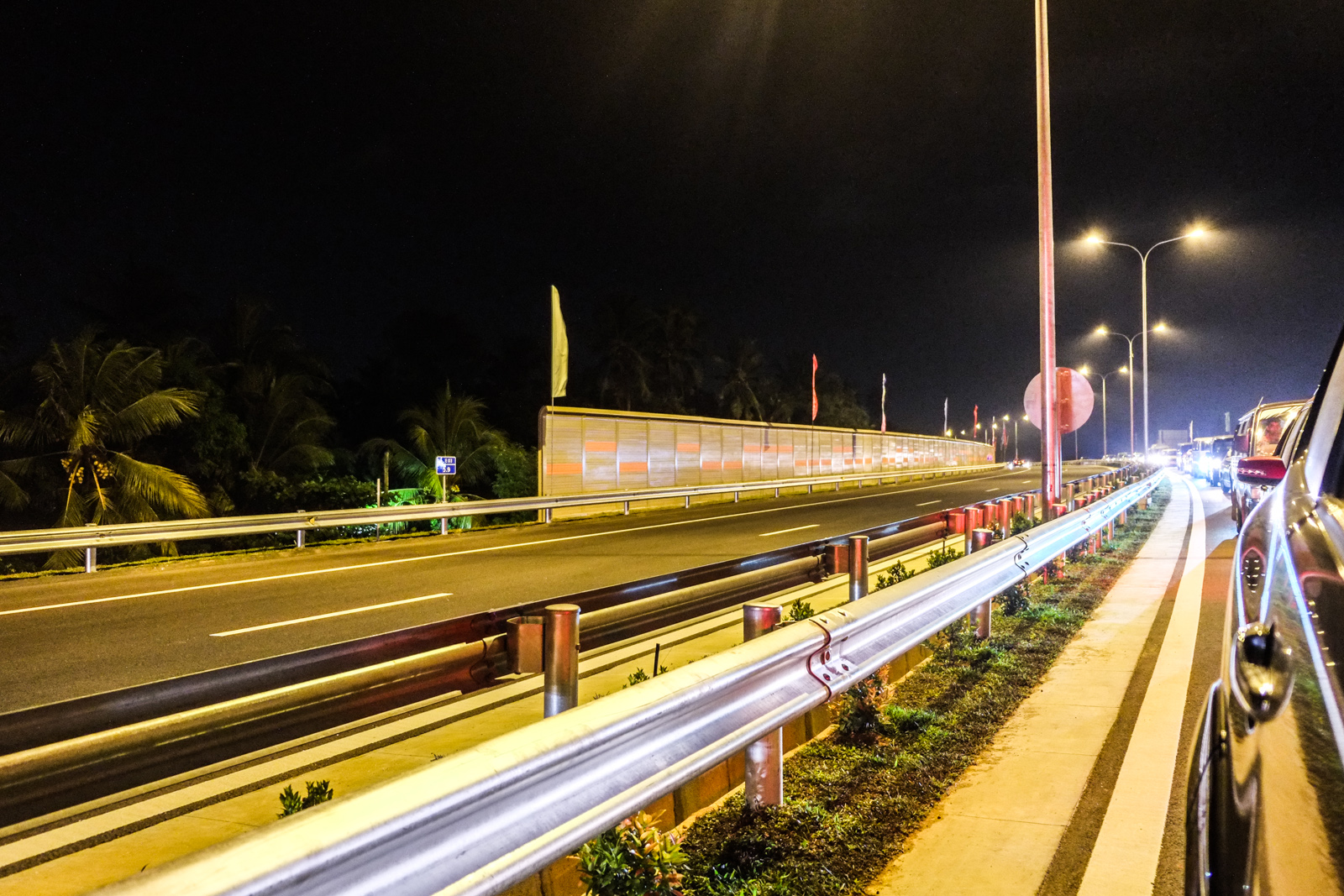
CKE at night

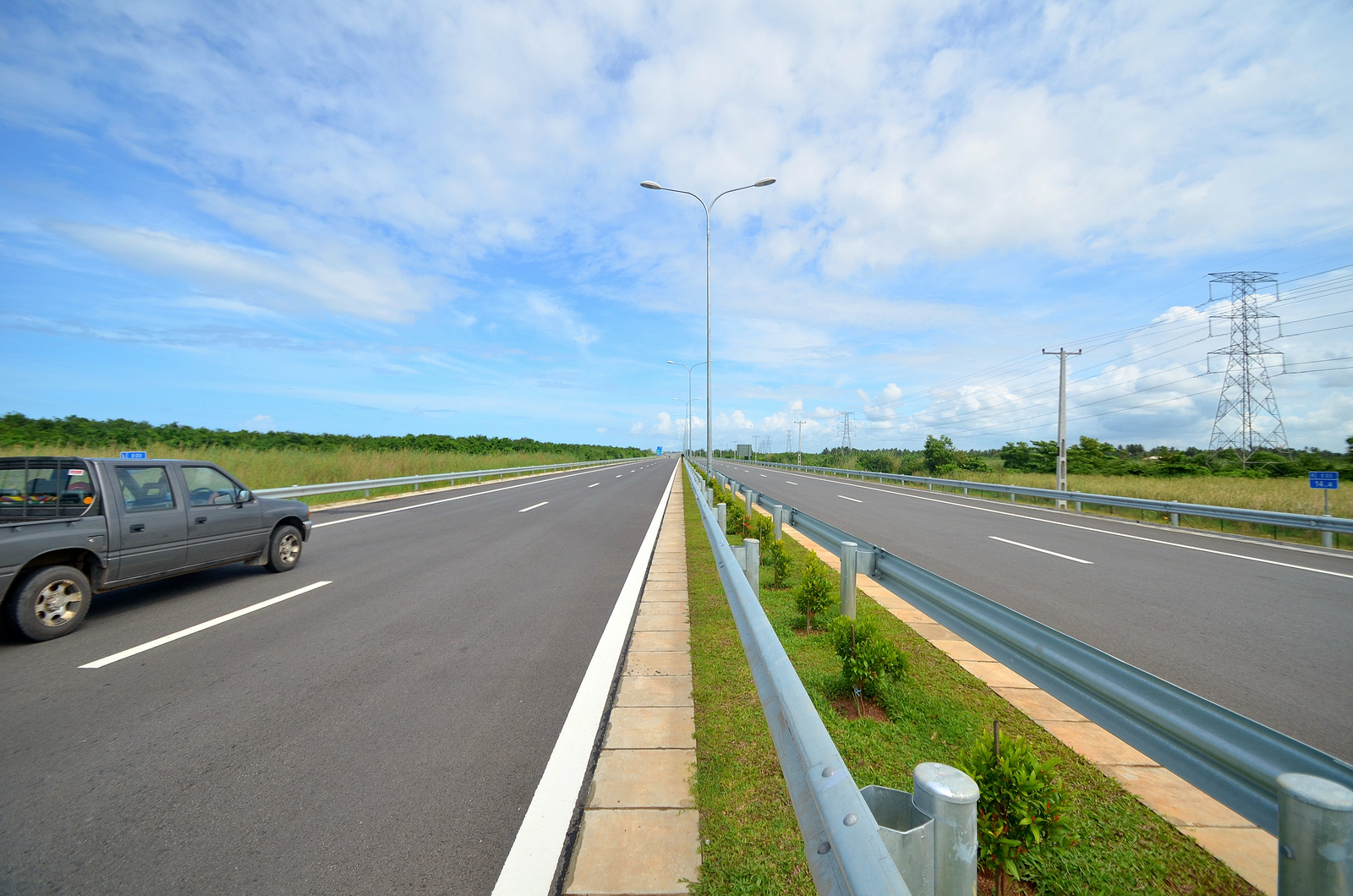
CKE

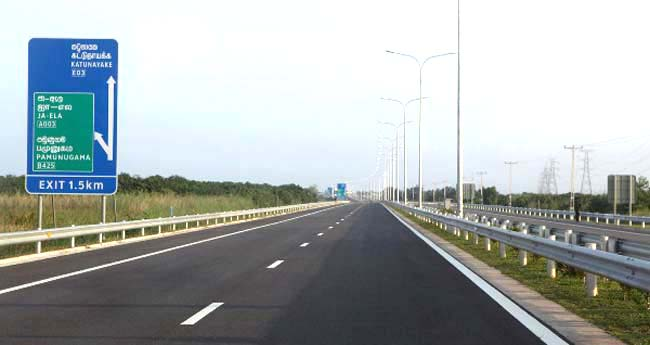
Colombo Katunayake Expressway declared open

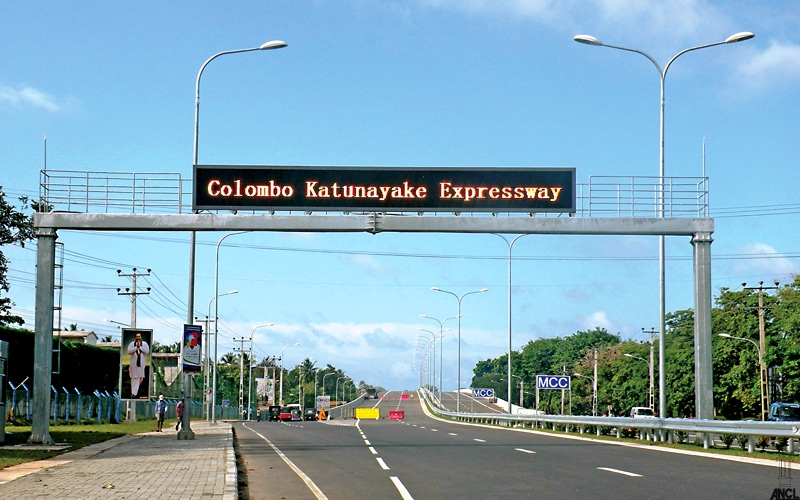
Display Sign on CKE

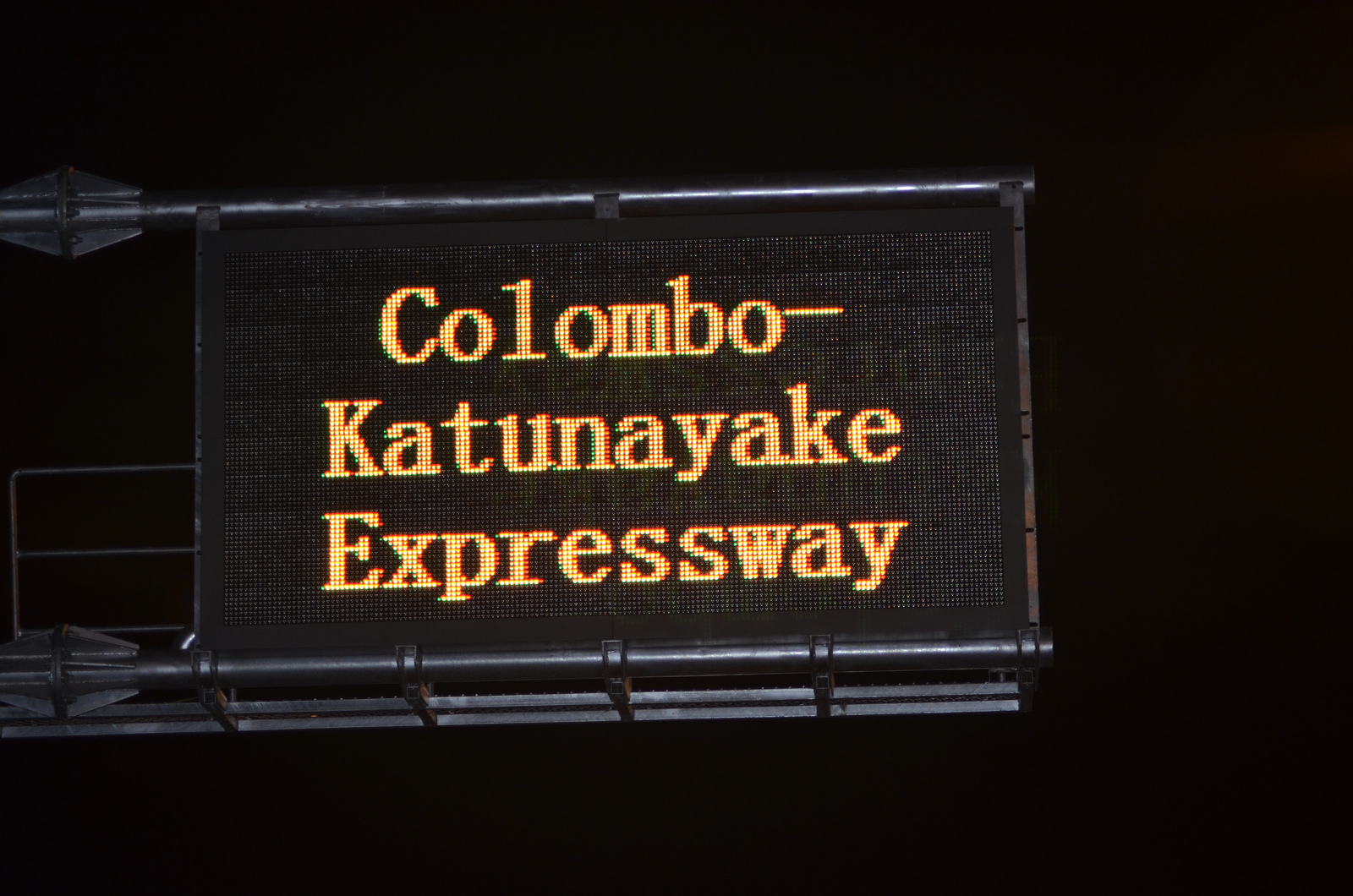
Electronic Display Sign - CKE

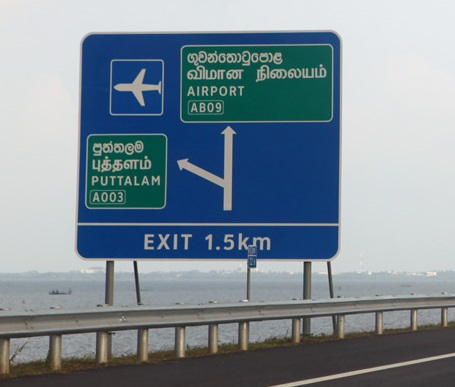
A road sign

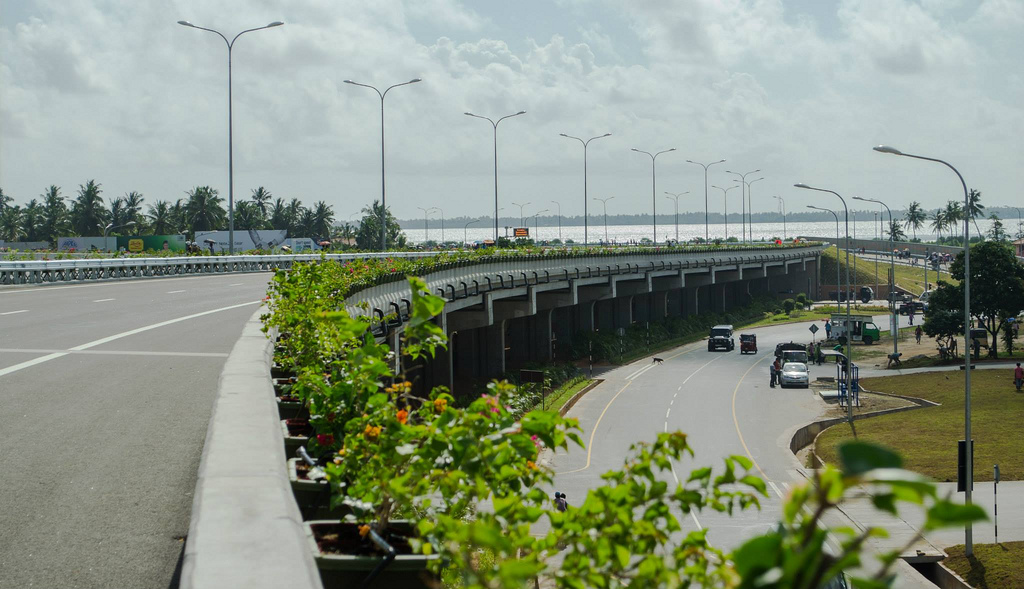
Elevated section of the CKE

== See also ==
- Transport in Sri Lanka
