= Central Expressway =

The following roads are named Central Expressway:

- Central Expressway (California), part of County Route G6 in Santa Clara County, California
- Central Expressway (Dallas), part of U.S. Highway 75 in Dallas, Texas
- Central Expressway (England), part of the A533 road in Runcorn, Cheshire
- Central Expressway (Korea), translation of Jungang Expressway (Expressway No.55)
- Central Expressway (Oklahoma), an alternate name for Interstate 235 in Oklahoma
- Central Expressway, Singapore
- Central Expressway (Sri Lanka)
