= Siva Obeyesekere =

Sri Lankan politician

Hon. Deshamanya Siva Obeyesekere

Minister of Health
- In office 1976–1977
- Prime Minister: Sirimavo Bandaranaike
- Preceded by: George Rajapaksa
- Succeeded by: Ranjit Atapattu

Member of Parliament for Mirigama
- In office 1965–1977

Personal details
- Born: 7 May 1929
- Died: 23 December 2017 (aged 88)
- Party: Sri Lanka Freedom Party
- Spouse: James Peter Obeyesekere III
- Education: Ladies' College, Colombo
- Occupation: Politics

Deshamanya Sivagami Verina "Siva" Obeyesekere (Sivagami; née Dassenaike; 7 May 1929 – 23 December 2017) was the Cabinet Minister of Health (1976-1977) and a Member of Parliament from Mirigama. She is known as the founder of the Laksala and Lakpahana.

== Early life and education ==
Born at the Dassanayake Walawwe in Mirigama to Lois Robert Clifton Dassenaike and Amybelle Charlotte Valerie née Corea, she was educated at Ladies' College, Colombo, where she was a hostel prefect and sports captain. Vijaya Corea was her half brother and Gamani Corea was her step-brother. She married James Peter Obeyesekere III, the only child of Sir James Peter Obeyesekere II, Maha Mudaliyar.

== Political career ==
=== Early political work ===
James and Siva Obeyesekere, supported their kinsmen, S.W.R.D. Bandaranaike when he left the United National Party and formed the Sri Lanka Freedom Party in 1951, becoming founding members. She assisted her husband in his unsuccessful campaign for the Mirigama electorate in the 1952 general election and in the successful campaign for the Attanagalla electorate in the 1960 July general election. James Obeyesekere would serve as the Parliamentary Secretary of Health and Finance, thereafter he was appointed to the Senate of Ceylon in 1965.

=== Handicraft industry ===
When James Obeyesekere was the member of parliament for Attanagalla from 1960 to 1965, Siva Obeyesekere organized community health programmes in 127 villages in the Attanagalle electorate and actively began to develop handicraft and handloom centres. In 1961, she was appointed chairman of the Small Industries Board. In 1963, she was appointed the chairman of the Accommodation Committee and a member of the Tourist Development Council that drafted the Tourist Development Act. In 1964, she started the Laksala, which was the first Government Cottage Industries Emporium and became the chairman of its advisory board. She also established the Craftsman's Association of Sri Lanka promoting the Master Craftsman's Apprenticeship Scheme. In 1973, she was elected president of the National Artisans and Craftsman's Association.

=== Parliament and Minister ===
She contested the Mirigama electorate in the 1965 general election from the Sri Lanka Freedom Party and won the seat defeating Wijayabahu Wijayasinha and entered parliament. She retained her seat in the 1970 general election defeating Professor W. S. Karunaratne. She was appointed Parliamentary Secretary of Health by Sirimavo Bandaranaike in 1970 and was promoted to Minister of Health in 1976 succeeding George Rajapaksa. During her tenure, she introduced the National Family Health Programme, which was later adopted by the United Nations as an international model. Senator Edward Kennedy gave her a special award of appreciation for her efforts. In 1973, she was elected vice president of the Status of Women in Family Planning conference in Djakarta and lead the Sri Lankan delegation to the World Population Conference in Bucharest. She was elected vice president of the World Health Organization Conference in Geneva in 1977. However, she was defeated in the 1977 general election in the landslid victory of the United National Party.

== Later work ==
She founded the Lakpahana, a private company that sold local handicrafts. In 1991, President Ranasinghe Premadasa awarded her the Deshamanya title and was elected the first president of the World Craft's Council affiliated to UNESCO. In 1993, she was the "Kamala Saamaan" in memory of Kamala Devi Chattopadyayi of India for the development of Laksala. In 2006, she was appointed National Consultant to the Ministry of Rural Industries and Self-Employment Promotion and was later appointed a presidential adviser to President Mahinda Rajapakse. In 2009, she was appointed to the S.W.R.D. Bandaranaike National Memorial Foundation by President Rajapakse.

== Family ==
Siva Dassenaike married James Obeyesekere and they had two children, James Peter Obeyesekere IV and Chantal De Saram.

== See also ==
- List of political families in Sri Lanka
