= Senerath Somaratne =

Sri Lankan politician (1929–1988)

Senerath Somaratne (20 August 1929 - 30 March 1988) was a Sri Lankan politician. He was the Deputy Minister of Irrigation, Power and Highways and a member of Parliament of Sri Lanka from Ampara representing the Sri Lanka Freedom Party.

Born in Palapatha in Beliatta, Senarath came to Ampara to work in the Gal Oya scheme. He was arrested during the 1958 communal riots. He was elected to parliament from Ampara in the 1965 general election, sitting in the opposition, and was re-elected in the 1970 general election. He was appointed Deputy Minister of Irrigation, Power and Highways in the second Bandaranaike administration. In the 1977 general election, P. Dayaratna of the United National Party defeated him.
