= J. E. Amaratunga =

Ceylonese planter, lawyer and politician

Hon. John Amaratunga

Member of the Ceylon Parliament for Mirigama
- In office 1952–1956
- Preceded by: D. S. Senanayake
- Succeeded by: Vimala Wijewardene

Personal details
- Born: John Edmund Amaratunga Kandalama, Ceylon
- Party: United National Party
- Occupation: lawyer, politician

John Edmund Amaratunga was a Ceylonese planter, lawyer and politician.

In October 1929 he enrolled at Lincoln's Inn and on 18 November 1933 was called to the bar as a barrister.

In 1939 he was appointed as the secretary of the Ceylon National Congress and the following years as treasurer.

He was elected to parliament at the 2nd parliamentary election held in May 1952, representing the United National Party in the Mirigama electorate. He defeated James Peter Obeyesekere III by 9,945 votes (securing 61% of the total vote).

He was unsuccessful in retaining seat at the 3rd parliamentary election held in April 1956, where he was defeated by 25,297 votes by the Sri Lanka Freedom Party candidate, Vimala Wijewardene.
