= Shasanamamaka Jana Prasadini =

Honorific title for Buddhist public service

Shasanamamaka Jana Prasadini is a title presented by the Asgiriya Chapter of Siam Nikaya to leaders and other public figures in Sri Lanka for their services towards Buddhism.

In October 2018 the title was bestowed upon Lakshman Kiriella, the Minister of Public Enterprises and Kandy Development and current Leader of the House, for his service to Buddhism and society.
