= E02 expressway (Sri Lanka) =

Road in Sri Lanka

Outer Circular Expressway
- Arthur C. Clarke Expressway

Route information
- Maintained by the Road Development Authority
- Length: 29 km (18 mi)

Major junctions
- Beltway around Colombo
- North end: Kerawalapitiya - connect with E03 Colombo - Katunayake Expressway
- Interchange 2 → Kadawatha; Interchange 3 → Kaduwela; Interchange 4 → Kothalawala; Interchange 5 → Athurugiriya
- South end: Kottawa, Colombo - Start of E01 Southern Expressway

Location
- Country: Sri Lanka

Highway system
- Roads in Sri Lanka; Expressways; A-Grade; B-Grade

The Colombo Outer Circular Expressway (also known as the Outer Circular Highway (OCH), Colombo Inter-provincial Orbital Router or the Arthur C. Clarke Expressway) is a highway in Colombo, Sri Lanka. It was opened in sections. The 29 km (18 mi) long outer circular road network links the Colombo - Matara Expressway with Colombo - Katunayake Expressway and the proposed Colombo - Kandy Expressway and will provide an orbital beltway to bypass the city of Colombo and reduce traffic congestion. The project is funded by the Japan International Cooperation Agency (JICA). The expressway is named "Arthur C. Clarke Expressway" in honor of Arthur C. Clarke, a famous science fiction writer and futurist who lived in Sri Lanka from 1956 to his death in 2008.

== History ==
The pre-feasibility study was carried out in 1992, five alternative traces have been studied. In 1999 a Feasibility Study was carried out under grant aid assistance from government of Japan. After the Environmental Impact Assessment was conducted the project approval was obtained from Central Environmental Authority for the section from Kerawelapitiya to Kottawa for a length of 28 km. Detailed Design Study for this 28 km stretch was commenced in July 2001 under a grant aid assistance from Government of Japan. Basic Design of the project has been carried out.

The project was delayed in November 2001 due to protests by residents in the area and the government decided to resettle them in different lands in the same area away from the planned highway.

Construction of the road commenced in October, 2009 and it is projected that the project will take at least eight years to complete. Access will be provided to all "A" class roads via interchanges. The highway will have an operational speed limit of 100 km/h and is to be built with four lanes and provisions to upgrade the road for six lanes of traffic.

== Construction ==
Construction of the Colombo Outer Circular road will be carried out in three phases: Phase 1 - an 11.0 km section from Kottawa to Kaduwela; Phase 2 - an 8.9 km section from Kaduwela to Kadawatha; and Phase 3 - a 9.3 km section from Kadawatha to Kerawelapitiya. Construction of the road commenced in October 2009 and is predicted that it will be completed in September 2017. The expressway will be Sri Lanka's costliest and most expensive road, estimated at US$57 million per km

In January 2013, Road Development Authority said that there will be an extra interchange in Athurugiriya with the intention of accommodating projected traffic from a fast developing area.

=== Phase one ===
The construction of first stage from Kottawa to Kaduwela, a length of 11 km, was completed at a cost of Rs. 27 billion in early 2014. It will be vested with the public on 8 March 2014.

=== Phase two ===
Construction of the second stage of the project from Kaduwela to Kadawatha, a length of 9.8 km, began on 18 February 2012. It was expected that phase two would be completed by January 2015, at an estimated cost of Rs. 49 billion.

The second phase is scheduled to be opened on 20 June 2015 and will form a major connection between Colombo and Kadawatha and a link to the Northern Expressway which will begin construction in July, thereafter connecting the capital with the major tourism cities: Kandy, Kurunegala and Dambulla.

=== Phase three ===
In January 2013, the third phase construction contract of this project from Kadawatha to Kerawalapitiya (length of 9.2 km) was awarded to China Metallurgical Group Corporation Limited by the Cabinet of Sri Lanka for a value of Rs. 66.69 billion.

== Connectivity ==
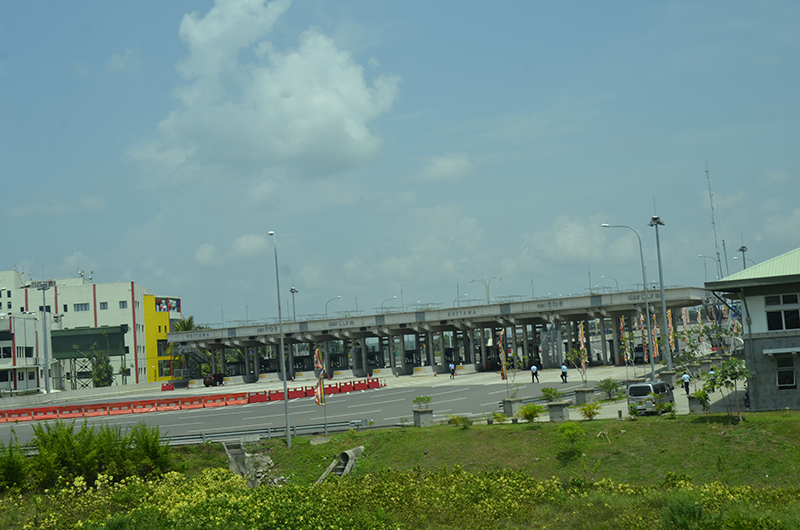
Kottawa Interchange

At Kottawa interchange the OCE will be connected to High Level road and the Colombo - Matara Expressway and at Athurugiriya it will be connected the Malabe - Athurugiriya road and later it will be connected to the proposed high elevated road to be constructed from Orugodawatta to Pore - Athurugiriya.

At Kaduwela interchange the OCE will be connected to Low Level road while at Kadawatha it will be connected to present Kandy road and to the proposed Kandy express way and the Northern highway.

There will connecting roads at Mattumagala connect the OCE to Colombo - Katunayake Expressway at Kerawalapitiya to connect the OCE with the Katunayake express way.

Interchange	Connections
Kerawalapitiya	E03 Colombo - Katunayake Expressway
Kadawatha	Colombo-Kandy Road; Proposed Colombo-Kandy / Northern Expressway
Kaduwela	Low Level Road; Peliyagoda-Mudungoda Road (New Kandy Road)
Kothalawala	Kaduwela-Malabe Road
Athurugiriya	Malabe-Athurugiriya Road; Proposed elevated way from Orugodawatta to Athurugiriya
Kottawa	High Level road E01 Southern Expressway
