= SLAF Mirigama =

Air force base in Sri Lanka

- Mirigama, Western Province in Sri Lanka

Site information
- Type: Radar Station
- Controlled by: Sri Lanka Air Force

Site history
- In use: 2008 – present

SLAF Mirigama is the Sri Lanka Air Force radar station in Mirigama. It provides air surveillance and early warning and is home to the No 4 Air Defence Radar Squadron. A Chinese JY-11 Radar low/medium altitude 3D surveillance radar has been installed since 2008 as part of the National Air Defence System of Sri Lanka.
