= Mahendra Wijeratne =

Sri Lankan politician (1934–2011)

Hon. Mahendra Wijeratne

Member of Parliament for Mirigama
- In office 1977–1989
- Preceded by: Siva Obeyesekere
- Succeeded by: Abolished

Personal details
- Born: Mahendra Surasinghe Wijeratne
- Died: March 2011
- Party: United National Party
- Children: MAHESHI WIJERATNE, UDENA WIJERATNE
- Occupation: Politician

Mahendra Surasinghe Wijeratne (12 March 1934 – March 2011) was a Sri Lankan politician. He was the former Minister of Livestock Development and Milk Production; and Deputy Minister of Trade and Shipping. Wijeratne was elected Member of Parliament from Mirigama having contested the 1977 general election from the United National Party defeating J. P. Obeysekera.

He was married to Mallika Wijeratne. They had three children. His son Udena Wijerathna is a Member of Western Provincial Council and daughter Maheshi is a Consultant Neuro Surgeon.

WIJERATNE – MAHENDRA (MP for Mirigama) – (Ex. Minister of Livestock Development and Milk Production and Deputy Minister of Trade and Shipping). Husband of Mallika, father of Rohan, Udena (Member of Western Provincial Council), Maheshi (Consultant Neuro Surgeon, Sri Jayawardenepura General Hospital), father-in-law of Fiona, Sujitha and Nigel, brother of Dudley, Swarna, Ingrid and Petronella, expired. Funeral on 9 March 2011 at 3.00 p.m. “Illana Walawwa”, Kandalama, Mirigama. 070062
