= Wijayabahu Wijayasinha =

Sri Lankan politician

Wijayabahu Wijayasinha (30 May 1916 – 19??) was a Sri Lankan politician. He was the member of Parliament of Sri Lanka from Mirigama representing the Sri Lanka Freedom Party.

He was elected to parliament from Ampara in the March 1960 general election and from Mirigama in the July 1960 general election defeating W. D. Senanayake. He crossed over to the opposition with C. P. de Silva in December 1964. He lost is seat in the 1965 general election to Siva Obeyesekere of the Sri Lanka Freedom Party when he contested from the Sri Lanka Freedom Socialist Party.
