= Ampara Electoral District (1960–1989) =

Electoral district of Sri Lanka

Coordinates: 7.2833°N 81.6667°E

Ampara Electoral District (Amparai Electoral District) was an electoral district of Sri Lanka between March 1960 and February 1989. The district was named after the town of Ampara in Ampara District, Eastern Province. The 1978 Constitution of Sri Lanka introduced the proportional representation electoral system for electing members of Parliament. The existing 160 mainly single-member electoral districts were replaced with 22 multi-member electoral districts. Ampara electoral district was replaced by the Ampara (Amparai) multi-member electoral district at the 1989 general elections, the first under the PR system, though Ampara continues to be a polling division of the multi-member electoral district.

== Members of Parliament ==
Key

Independent SLFP UNP

| Election | Member | Party | Term |
|---|---|---|---|
| 1960 (March) | Wijayabahu Wijayasinha | Sri Lanka Freedom Party | 1960-1960 |
| 1960 (July) | Indrasena de Zoysa | Sri Lanka Freedom Party | 1960-1965 |
| 1965 | Senerath Somaratne | Sri Lanka Freedom Party | 1965-1977 |
| 1970 | Senerath Somaratne | Sri Lanka Freedom Party | 1965-1977 |
| 1977 | Petikirige Dayaratna | United National Party | 1977-1989 |

== Elections ==
=== 1960 (March) Parliamentary General Election ===
Results of the 4th parliamentary election held on 19 March 1960:

| Candidate | Party | Symbol | Votes | % |
|---|---|---|---|---|
| Wijayabahu Wijayasinha | Sri Lanka Freedom Party | Hand | 4,237 | 32.09% |
| M. S. Bakmiwewa | Mahajana Eksath Peramuna | Cart Wheel | 3,829 | 29.00% |
| D. P. Goonatilake | United National Party | Elephant | 2,962 | 22.43% |
| A. S. de Silva | Lanka Sama Samaja Party | Key | 1,577 | 11.94% |
| K. P. Augo Singho | Independent | Sun | 246 | 1.86% |
| D. Wickramaarachchige | Lanka Democratic Party | Umbrella | 184 | 1.39% |
| H. M. Appuhamy | | Cockerel | 88 | 0.67% |
| Indradasa Samaranayake | | Orange | 80 | 0.61% |
| Valid Votes | | | 13,203 | 100.00% |
| Rejected Votes | | | 188 | |
| Total Polled | | | 13,391 | |
| Registered Electors | | | 19,535 | |
| Turnout | | | 68.55% | |

=== 1960 (July) Parliamentary General Election ===
Results of the 5th parliamentary election held on 20 July 1960:

| Candidate | Party | Symbol | Votes | % |
|---|---|---|---|---|
| Indrasena de Zoysa | Sri Lanka Freedom Party | Hand | 5,710 | 44.79% |
| D. P. Goonatilake | United National Party | Elephant | 3,713 | 29.13% |
| M. S. Bakmiwewa | Mahajana Eksath Peramuna | Cart Wheel | 3,325 | 26.08% |
| Valid Votes | | | 12,748 | 100.00% |
| Rejected Votes | | | 79 | |
| Total Polled | | | 12,827 | |
| Registered Electors | | | 19,535 | |
| Turnout | | | 65.66% | |

=== 1965 Parliamentary General Election ===
Results of the 6th parliamentary election held on 22 March 1965:

| Candidate | Party | Symbol | Votes | % |
|---|---|---|---|---|
| Senerath Somaratne | Sri Lanka Freedom Party | Hand | 10,077 | 41.20% |
| Kalanasiri Sundasinghe | United National Party | Elephant | 7,857 | 32.12% |
| M. S. Bakmiwewa | Mahajana Eksath Peramuna | Cart Wheel | 6,524 | 26.67% |
| Valid Votes | | | 24,458 | 100.00% |
| Rejected Votes | | | 290 | |
| Total Polled | | | 24,748 | |
| Registered Electors | | | 32,914 | |
| Turnout | | | 75.19% | |

=== 1970 Parliamentary General Election ===
Results of the 7th parliamentary election held on 27 May 1970:

| Candidate | Party | Symbol | Votes | % |
|---|---|---|---|---|
| Senerath Somaratne | Sri Lanka Freedom Party | Hand | 18,570 | 55.97% |
| Petikirige Dayaratna | United National Party | Elephant | 14,194 | 42.78% |
| Y. S. Minoris | | Chair | 414 | 1.25% |
| Valid Votes | | | 33,178 | 100.00% |
| Rejected Votes | | | 220 | |
| Total Polled | | | 33,398 | |
| Registered Electors | | | 42,029 | |
| Turnout | | | 79.46% | |

=== 1977 Parliamentary General Election ===
Results of the 8th parliamentary election held on 21 July 1977:

| Candidate | Party | Symbol | Votes | % |
|---|---|---|---|---|
| Petikirige Dayaratna | | Elephant | 24,581 | 59.18% |
| Senerath Somaratne | | Hand | 16,009 | 38.54% |
| A. Seelaratne De Silva | | Key | 945 | 2.28% |
| Valid Votes | | | 41,535 | 100.00% |
| Rejected Votes | | | 161 | |
| Total Polled | | | 41,696 | |
| Registered Electors | | | 49,006 | |
| Turnout | | | 85.08% | |
