= Vimala Wijewardene =

Ceylonese politician (1908–1994)

Hon. Vimala Wijewardene

Minister of Local Government and Housing
- In office 30 September 1958 – 21 November 1959
- Prime Minister: S. W. R. D. Bandaranaike; Wijeyananda Dahanayake
- Preceded by: Jayaweera Kuruppu
- Succeeded by: M. B. W. Mediwake

Minister of Health
- In office 12 June 1956 – 30 September 1958
- Prime Minister: S. W. R. D. Bandaranaike
- Preceded by: E. A. Nugawela
- Succeeded by: A. P. Jayasuriya

Member of the Ceylon Parliament for Mirigama
- In office 19 April 1956 – 19 March 1960
- Preceded by: John Amaratunga
- Succeeded by: A. A. E. Jayasinghe

Personal details
- Born: Vimalavathi Silva; 7 August 1908 Katana, British Ceylon
- Died: 27 January 1994 (aged 85) Mawanella, Sri Lanka
- Party: Sri Lanka Freedom Party
- Spouse: Don Charles Wijewardene (m. 1924; died 1956)
- Children: Padmini, Rukmini, Ananda
- Education: Visakha Vidyalaya
- Occupation: Politician, Businesswoman, Cultivator

Vimala Wijewardene (Vimala; née Silva; 7 August 1908 – 27 January 1994) was a Sri Lankan politician and the country's first female cabinet minister.

== Marriage and family ==
Following the death of her older sister, Vimala married her sister's widower Don Charles Wijewardene (1892-1956) at age sixteen. He was the fifth son of Don Philip Tudugala Wijewardene; a timber merchant of Sedavatta and Helena Dep (née Weerasinghe) and the younger brother of newspaper magnate Don Richard. They had three children; Ananda, Padmini, and Rukmini.

Don Charles helped unite the Sangha in support of the restoration of independence in Ceylon. He was responsible for compiling the book Dharma Vijaya (Triumph of Righteousness) or The Revolt in the Temple. Published in English in 1953, the book brought accolades from all parts of the world. It acknowledged the ugliness of colonial rule, the sublime nature of Buddhism, and the values it imparted. His mother, Helena was responsible for arranging the financing of the restoration of the Kelaniya Raja Maha Vihara. His brother Don Walter was entrusted with the restoration of the Kelaniya Temple. Due to his untimely death, Don Charles took over the affairs until its completion. He was the patron of Thalevala Vijitha (Dhammarakkitha), who later became the chief incumbent after the demise of his predecessor Mapitigama Buddharakkita.

== Political career ==
In 1952, she contested the seat of Kelaniya at the 2nd parliamentary election, representing the Sri Lanka Freedom Party. Her opponent was the United National Party incumbent (and her nephew), J. R. Jayewardene, losing by 6,235 votes. At the 3rd parliamentary elections in 1956, she contested the Mirigama electorate and was elected, receiving 36,193 votes (75.25% of the total vote) defeating the sitting member, John Amaratunga.

In June 1956, she was appointed Minister of Health in S. W. R. D. Bandaranaike's cabinet, becoming the country's first female cabinet minister. She made numerous transformations in a then male-dominated health system. At the time of her appointment, female doctors were not permitted to be in charge of hospital wards. She changed the system by giving senior doctors the right to oversee wards. Subsequently, she gave formal recognition to traditional medical practitioners by registering them in the health system.

Upon discovering the health system lacked funds, Wijewardene began a lottery (Arogya) for the purpose of gathering funds. As this enterprise succeeded beyond expectation, Arogya became what is now the National Lotteries Board of Ceylon.

In June 1958, she was appointed Minister for Local Government and Housing. One of her first duties was introducing legislation to allow traditional medical practitioners to grow marijuana, which was essential for their medicinal preparations, saving foreign exchange. She retained the position of Minister of Local Government and Housing in the subsequent Dahanayake cabinet in 1959.

On 21 November 1959, she was placed under house arrest and three months later taken into custody in connection with the assassination of Prime Minister of Sri Lanka S. W. R. D. Bandaranaike, which led to her dismissal as Minister of Local Government. In the preliminary investigation, it was proven she was wrongly accused. She was found innocent and all charges were dismissed. However, the stigma attached to the charges effectively ended her political career.

After the charges against her were dropped in July 1960, she converted to Christianity and spent a religiously inclined life being a regular participant at Christian revival meetings.

== See also ==
- Assassination of S. W. R. D. Bandaranaike
- Adisham Hall
