= Indrasena de Zoysa =

Sri Lankan politician

Erathnawalli Indrasena de Zoysa was a Sri Lankan politician. He was the member of Parliament of Sri Lanka from Ampara representing the Sri Lanka Freedom Party.

He was elected to parliament from Ampara in the July 1960 general election. He crossed over to the opposition with C. P. de Silva in December 1964.
