= James Peter Obeyesekere III =

Sri Lankan politician and aviator

The Honourable Deshamanya James Peter Obeyesekere III
- Obeyesekere on the left

Member of Parliament for Attanagalla
- In office 19 March 1960 – 22 March 1965
- Preceded by: S.W.R.D. Bandaranaike
- Succeeded by: Sirimavo Bandaranaike

Personal details
- Born: 14 July 1915
- Died: 23 October 2007 (aged 92)
- Party: Sri Lanka Freedom Party
- Spouse: Siva Obeyesekere
- Education: Royal College, Colombo, Trinity College, Cambridge
- Occupation: Politics
- Profession: Barrister

Military service
- Allegiance: Ceylon; United Kingdom
- Branch/service: Royal Air Force
- Unit: Royal Observer Corps
- Battles/wars: World War II

Deshamanya James Peter Obeyesekere III (14 July 1915 – 23 October 2007) was a Sri Lankan politician and aviator. A Senator, he was also a Parliamentary Secretary to the Minister of Health and Finance.

== Early life and education ==
Born to Sir James Peter Obeyesekere II, a barrister who was an advocate of the colonial era Supreme Court of Ceylon and served as the last Maha Mudaliyar (the chief native interpreter and adviser to the British Governor of Ceylon). His grandfather was Sir James Peter Obeyesekere I.

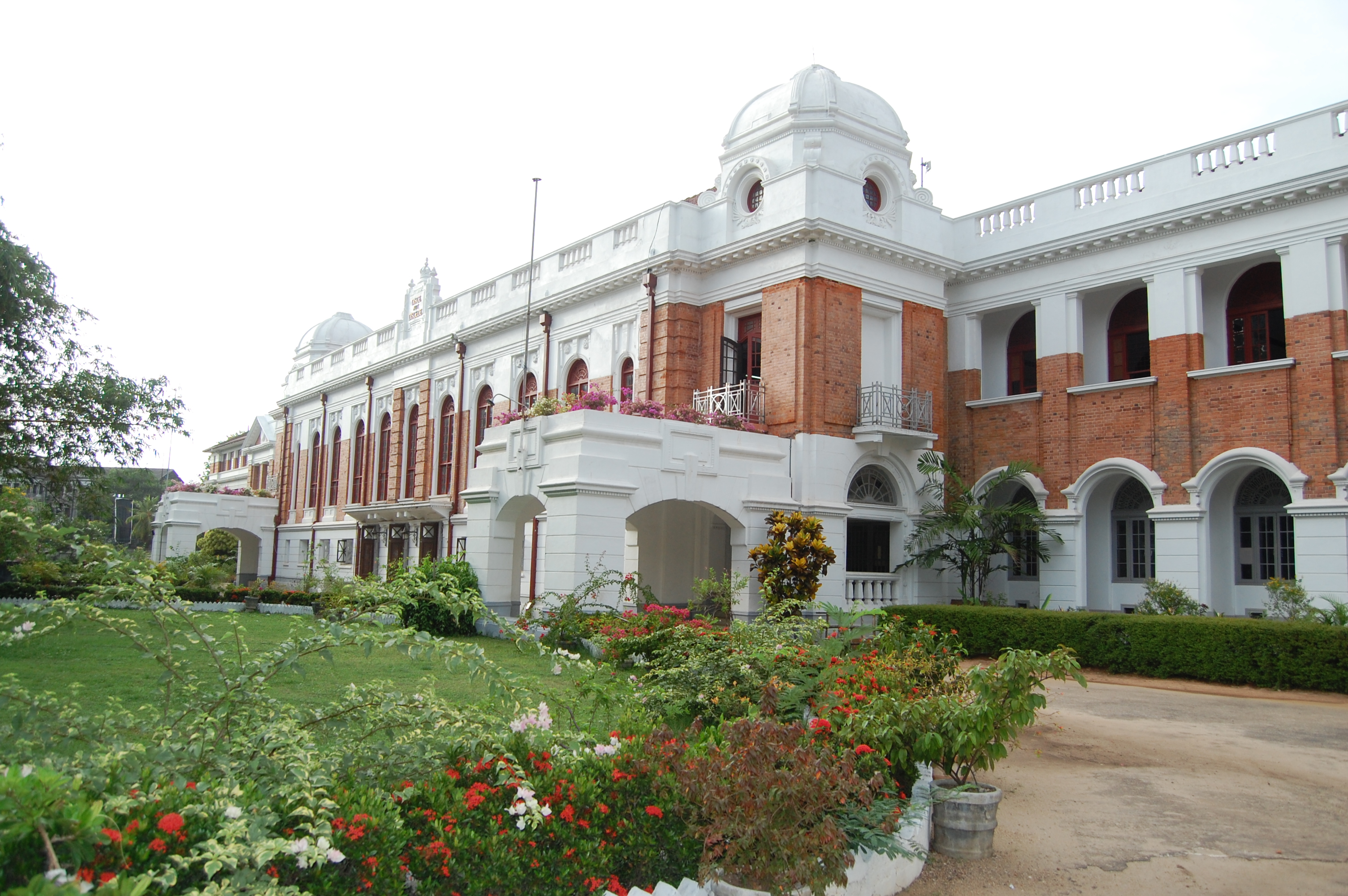
The young James Peter Obeyesekere was educated at the Royal College, Colombo.

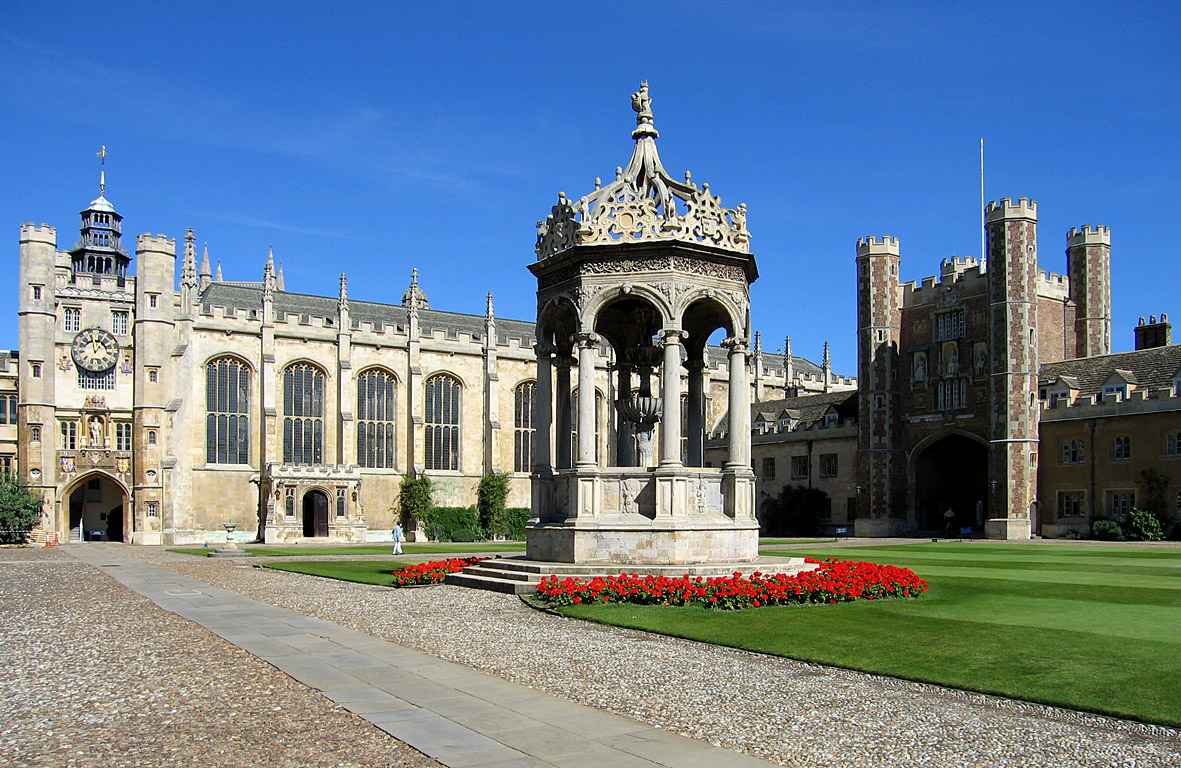
Obeyesekere attended Trinity College, Cambridge, he was an active member of the Cambridge Union.

Educated at the Royal College, Colombo, Obeyesekere went on to study at Trinity College, Cambridge gaining a MA. There he was a member of the Cambridge Union Society and of the Debating Team of Trinity College. An accomplished sportsman, he was awarded a half blue in athletics at Cambridge, later becoming a certified athletics coach and excellent horseman and equestrian. He went on to become a barrister.

== Aviation ==
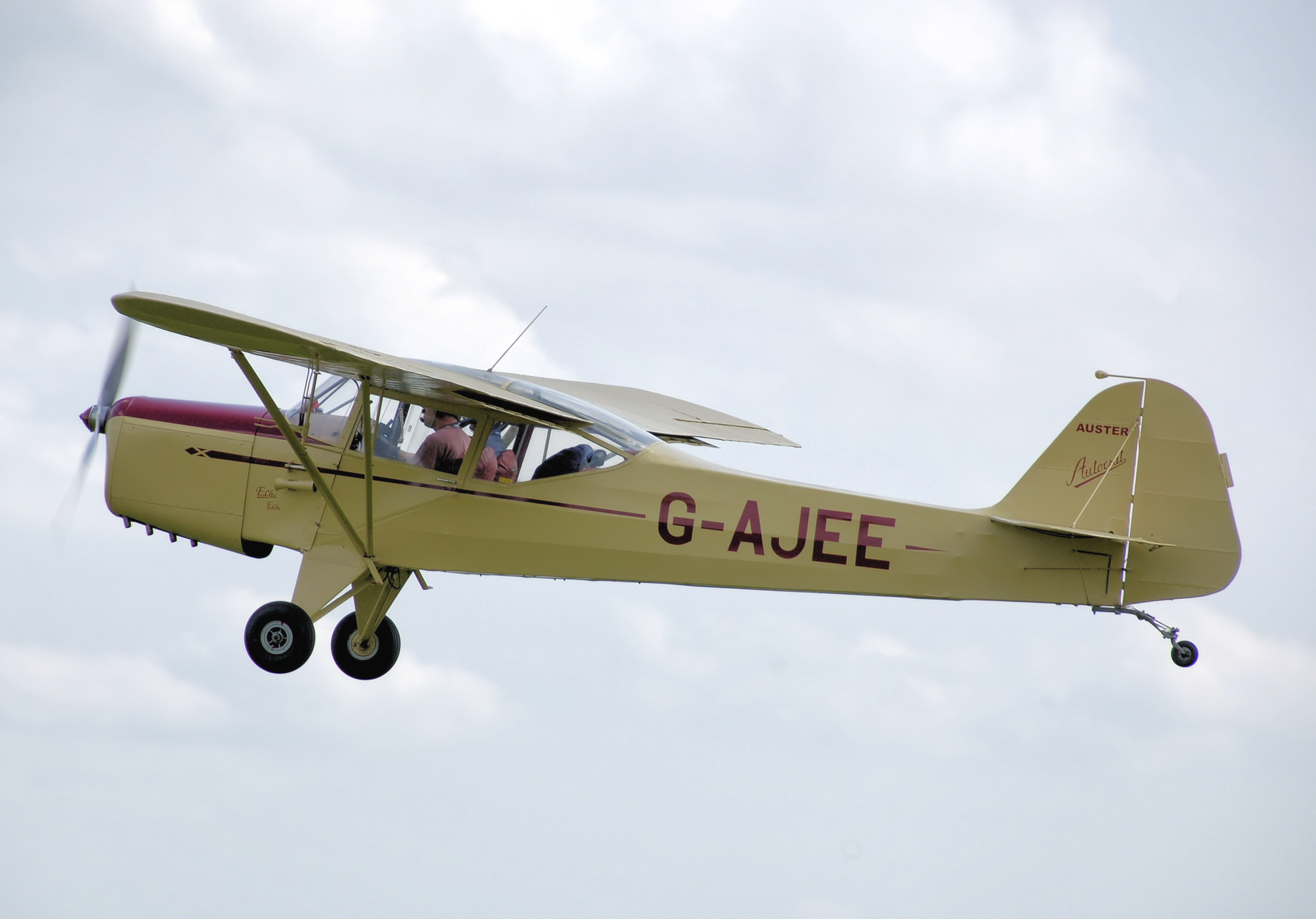
Obeyesekere created aviation history in South Asia when he became the first Sri Lankan to undertake what is erroneously described as a "solo flight" from England to Sri Lanka in November 1946, in close company with another pilot in an identical Auster aircraft.

With the outbreak of World War II he joined the Cambridge University Air Squadron becoming a qualified pilot, he was invited to join the Royal Air Force as a pilot, however he turned down the offer and instead joined the Royal Observer Corps. In November 1946, he flew his single-engined Auster Autocrat home to Ceylon from England, becoming the first Ceylonese to make such a flight. Throughout the epic journey, Obeyesekere was accompanied by Sqdn. Ldr. Roderick A.F. Farquharson in an identical Auster. Farquharson's not insignificant role in that epic flight was described in contemporary newspaper reports and early articles by Obeyesekere himself.

His aviation interests were also strong as he was the Chairman of the Colombo Flying Club until its takeover by the government. He gave his Auster to the Ceylon Air Academy for civilian pilot training. The aircraft was destroyed in a fatal accident on March 11, 1971, but nearly 40 years later it was rebuilt for static display at the Sri Lanka Air Force Museum, Ratmalana in memory of his flight from England to Ceylon.

== Racing ==
A racing enthusiast, he competed in many racing events in Sri Lanka, India and England. He won the Grand Prix de Lanka. He was the vice patron of the Classic Car Club of Ceylon and was the only Asian to be elected an Honorary Life Member of the prestigious Bentley Drivers’ Club. He was also members of the British Automobile Racing Club and of the Cambridge University Automobile Club. Obeyesekere was very active in the scout movement and was a former president of the Sri Lanka Scout Association.

== Political career ==
James Obeyesekere and his wife Siva, supported their kinsmen, S.W.R.D. Bandaranaike when he left the United National Party and formed the Sri Lanka Freedom Party in 1951, becoming founding members. He contested the parliamentary seat of Mirigama in the 1952 general election, but lost. After S.W.R.D. Bandaranaike was assassinated in 1959, he contested from his constituency the Attanagalla electorate in the 1960 July general election and entering parliament. S.W.R.D. Bandaranaike's widow, Sirimavo Bandaranaike who became prime minister, appointed Obeyesekere as Parliamentary Secretary to the Minister of Health and thereafter Parliamentary Secretary to the Minister of Finance. He did not contest the 1965 general election, stepping down in-favor of Sirimavo Bandaranaike to take over her late husband's constituency, in return Obeyesekere was appointed a Senator serving until the Senate was abolished in 1971. His wife entered politics in 1965 contesting from the Mirigama electorate, which was her hometown. He contested the 1977 general election from Mirigama and was defeated by Mahendra Wijeratne. In 2006, he was conferred the national honour of Deshamanya by President Mahinda Rajapakse.

== Family ==
He married Sivagami Dassanaike, they had two children, James Peter IV and Chantal.

== Bibliography ==
- Obeyesekere, J. P. (2009) [1997]. My airway home: England-Ceylon solo flight: arrival Ratmalana 13th November, 1946. Colombo. OCLC 977674925.

== See also ==
- List of political families in Sri Lanka
- Obeyesekere Walawa
