= Central Expressway (Sri Lanka) =

Proposed road in Sri Lanka

Central Expressway

Route information
- Maintained by the Road Development Authority
- Length: 137 km (85 mi)
- Existed: 2022–present

Major junctions
- South end: Kadawatha E02 Outer Circular Expressway
- North end: Dambulla

Location
- Country: Sri Lanka
- Provinces: Western Province, Sri Lanka, North Western Province, Sri Lanka, Central Province, Sri Lanka
- Towns: Mirigama, Kurunegala

Highway system
- Roads in Sri Lanka; Expressways; A-Grade; B-Grade

The Central Expressway (E04) connects several important cities in Sri Lanka. It provides access to Colombo, the commercial capital of Sri Lanka, and connects Gampaha, a major industrial city in Sri Lanka, with the culturally rich cities of Kurunegala and Kandy (via Galagedara). It will provide a fast alternative to the existing A1 Colombo - Kandy and A6 Ambepussa - Trincomalee Highways. The Expressway starts at the Kadawatha Interchange on the E02 Outer Circular Expressway and ends in Dambulla at the A9 Kandy - Jaffna Highway, traversing through Gampaha, Kurunegala and Matale Districts. A link Expressway starting from Pothuhera and ending in Galagedara will provide access to the Kandy District.

== History ==
The idea was originally proposed by the UNP government under Ranil Wickremesinghe. In 2002, a Malaysian company had discussions with the then United National Party (UNP) government over the Kandy-Colombo Expressway. However the project was not able to commence due to the elections and the fall of the UNP government. The expressway was supposed to connect the Western Region Megapolis project with the "Greater Kandy Development Project" both projects were also cancelled after the fall of the government.

In November 2013 the Project Minister for Highways announced that construction work on the expressway now known as the Northern Expressway would commence in January 2015. The first phase of the works will link the E03 expressway at Kadawatha through to Kurunegala via Enderamulla and Mirigama. The next stage will see the road extended to Katugastota in Kandy. The Minister advised that the expressway would be built in three stages with financial assistance from China.

On 14 December 2014 the President Mahinda Rajapaksa, launched the construction of the expressway by laying a foundation stone at the Senkadagala entrance of the expressway. The total cost of the expressway was estimated to be approximately Rs.200 billion and the works were scheduled to be completed by 2018. After the new government came into power in 2015, expressway was re-named back to the 'Central Expressway' from 'Kandy Expressway', Prime Minister Ranil Wickramasinghe again launched the construction of the expressway by laying a foundation stone in February 2017 with the first phase expected to be completed in 2.5 years. The final environment impact assessment made by May 2016.

The second stage of the project, which connects Mirigama to Kurunegala was opened to the public on 15 January 2022.

== Construction ==
Construction of the Central Expressway will be carried out in four Stages as follows:

- Stage 1 - Kadawatha (0.0 km) to Meerigama (37.1 km)
- Stage 2 - Meerigama (37.1 km) to Kurunegala (76.8 km) and Ambepussa link road (9.3 km)
- Stage 3 - Pothuhera (0.0 km) to Galagedara (Kandy) (32.5 km)
- Stage 4 - Kurunegala (76.8 km) to Dambulla (137.1 km)

=== Stage 1 ===
The construction of first stage from Kadawatha to Mirigama will be a four lane divided carriageway (with room for a future two lanes) for a length of 48.2 km (30.0 mi). There are proposed interchanges at Kadawatha, Gampaha, Veyangoda and Mirigama, with fifty overpasses and thirty underpasses along the route. The initial estimated cost of Phase One was approx. Rs. 70bn, with more recent costs estimated at Rs.130bn. Then Prime Minister, now President Ranil Wickramasinghe launched the construction of the expressway by laying a foundation stone in August 2015 for this phase. The project completion was delayed which the Government has already incurred a loss of around Rs. 30 billion as a result. Construction work has officially resumed and has surpassed 53% completion. The Ministry has announced that the Kadawatha System Interchange is targeted for early 2027, with the full section scheduled to open to the public by mid-2028.

=== Stage 2 ===
Construction of the second stage of the project from Mirigama to Kurunegala, will also be a four-lane divided carriageway for a length of 40.91 km (25.42 mi), with thirty overpasses and five underpasses. Interchanges are proposed at Nakalagamuwa, Dambokka, Kurunegala and Yaggapitiya. The tentative cost of construction for Phase Two is Rs. 149.0bn. Prime Minister Ranil Wickramasinghe launched the construction of the expressway by laying a foundation stone in February 2017 for this phase, and it was completed and opened in January 2022. This phase will be totally completed by local construction companies for the 1st time in Sri Lanka.

=== Stage 3 ===
Cost for this stage 3 stretch of the expressway has been estimated at Rs.135 billion. Awarding of the contract for Central Expressway Stage III have stirred up questions and controversy. It was revealed that funding for the third phase also from commercial loan with a high interest rates. President Maithripala Sirisena had said the tender procedure was violated when awarding the contract for the expressway. In September 2017, Prime Minister Ranil Wickramasinghe had to make a parliament statement regarding this. The construction was re-commenced in December 2020 by Prime Minister Mahinda Rajapaksha.Restarted in 2025,Pothuhera to Rambukkana (13.8 km): Over 90% of civil work is done. It is scheduled to open in early 2027.Rambukkana to Galagedara (18.65 km): Contracts worth LKR 112 billion were awarded to local firms. It is scheduled for completion in 2028.

== Interchanges ==
Location	Distance from Kadawatha	Type of interchange	Description
Kadawatha	0.000	System IC	System IC with Outer Circular Highway
Gampaha	11.3	Service IC	Gampha-Minuwangoda New Road/Gampaha-Yakkala road
Veyangoda	22.0	Service IC	Service IC with Veyangoda–Ruwanwella (B445) Road
Mirigama South	33.37	Service IC	Mirigama Divulapitiya Negambo Road
Mirigama North	37.8	Service/System IC	Service IC Pasyala Giriulla Road and System IC with Ambepussa link Road
Ambepussa	47.1	Junction	Ambepussa–Kurunagala–Trincomalee Road (A006 Road)
Nakalagamuwa	55.5	Service IC	Service IC with Alawwa–Dampelessa (B008) Road
Pothuhara	62.8	Service IC	Service IC  with section 3 of CEP (Expressway link to Kandy)
Dambokka	70.4	Service IC	Ambepussa–Kurunagala–Trincomalee Road (A006 Road)
Kurunegala	75.8	Service IC	Katugastota–Kurunagala–Puttalam Road (A010 Road)
Rideegama	92.6	Service IC	Thalgodapitiya–Yatawatta–Dombawela Road (B409)
Melsiripura	101.9	Service IC	Ambepussa–Kurunagala–Trincomalee Road (A006 Road)
Galewela	115.4	Service IC	Ambepussa–Kurunagala–Trincomalee Road (A006 Road)
Dambulla (A- 9)	129.5	Service IC	Kandy–Jaffna Road (A009 Road)
Dambulla	136.9	Service IC	Ambepussa–Kurunagala–Trincomalee Road (A006 Road)
