= P. Dayaratna =

Sri Lankan politician (1936–2025)

The Honourable P. Dayaratna
- පී. දයාරත්න பி. தயாரத்தின

Minister of State Resources & Enterprise Development
- In office 2010–2015

Minister of Planning Implementation
- In office 2007–2010

Minister of Health, Nutrition & Welfare
- In office 2001–2004

Member of Parliament for Ampara District
- In office 9 March 1989 – 26 June 2015

Member of Parliament for Ampara
- In office 1977–1989

Personal details
- Born: Petikirige Dayaratna; 1 October 1936 Godigamuwa, British Ceylon (now in Sri Lanka)
- Died: July 2025 (aged 88) Horana, Sri Lanka
- Party: United National Party
- Other political affiliations: United People's Freedom Alliance (2007–2015)
- Spouse: Deepthika Dayaratne (m. 1971)
- Children: 3
- Education: Ananda College; Brighton Technical College
- Profession: Engineer

Petikirige Dayaratna (Sinhala: පැටිකිරිගේ දයාරත්න; Tamil: பெட்டிகிரிகே தயாரத்தின; 1 October 1936 – July 2025) was a Sri Lankan politician who was a member of the Parliament of Sri Lanka. He was elected to parliament as a United National Party MP from the Ampara District in 1977.

== Early life and education ==
Petikirige Dayaratna was born on 1 October 1936. His parents were Petikirige Wimalasena and Dehipitiyage Leelawathie Gunawardene. Born in his maternal ancestral home in the hamlet of Godigamuwa in Kalutara District, he received his basic education in the school of his home town, Wethara, and in 1947 entered Ananda College, Colombo to complete his secondary education. In 1961, he gained admission to Brighton Technical College, England where he graduated as an electrical engineer in 1965 and returned home on 23 April 1965. On 17 May 1965, he joined state service as an Assistant Electrical Engineer of the Gal Oya Development Board stationed in Ampara.

In 1965, he was appointed as the electrical engineer of the Department of Government Electrical Undertakings, which would become the Ceylon Electricity Board (CEB) during his tenure of office.

== Political career ==
At the time of the 1970 parliamentary elections, Ampara was a leftist stronghold. Dayaratna, who resigned from government service to contest for the Ampara seat in parliament, lost to Somaratne Senarath, a staunch leftist from Ampara.

While serving as the electrical engineer of CEB in August 1967, Dayaratna was elected as President of the Mandala Mahaviharaya Buddhist Society of Ampara Town and under the guidance of Ven. Dodamduwe Dhammaratana Nayaka Thera, completed the construction work of the Cetiya within two years.

With the blessings of then-UNP leader J. R. Jayewardene, Dayaratna contested for the Ampara seat once again at the 1977 parliamentary elections and won with a majority of 8,000 votes, recording the first-ever victory for the UNP in Ampara.

In October 1978 he was appointed the District Minister for Ampara. In 1981 he was appointed Deputy Minister of Power and Energy and became Minister in 1987. In February 1989, he was given the portfolio of Lands, Irrigation and Mahaweli Development and in April 1991 he was made the Minister of Rehabilitation, Reconstruction and Social Welfare.

Although the UNP lost power at the 1994 parliamentary elections, Dayaratna was able to secure reelection. He was reelected at the subsequent elections held in 2000, 2001, 2004 and 2010. He was the Minister of Health, Nutrition and Welfare under the UNF government from 2001 to 2004. In 2007, he defected to the then-ruling United People's Freedom Alliance along with 17 other MPs to support then-incumbent president Mahinda Rajapaksa, but returned to the UNP in 2015.

== Personal life and death ==
Dayaratna married Deepthika Dayaratna on 2 June 1971. The couple had three children.

Dayaratna died in July 2025, at the age of 88.
