= E03 expressway (Sri Lanka) =

Road in Sri Lanka

Colombo–Katunayake Expressway
- Airport Expressway
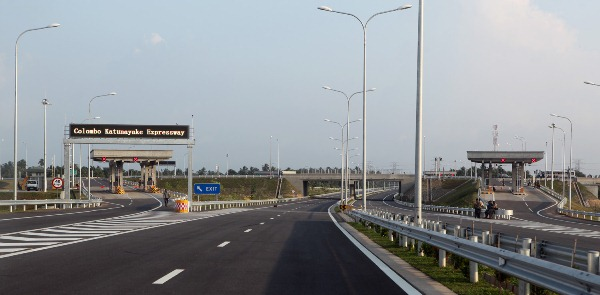

Route information
- Maintained by the Road Development Authority
- Length: 25.8 km (16.0 mi)
- Existed: 27 October 2013–present
- History: Opened on 27 October 2013

Major junctions
- North end: Bandaranaike International Airport and Negombo.
- Interchange 4 → Ja-Ela; Interchange 3 → Kerawalapitiya - connect with E02 Outer Circular Expressway; Interchange 2 → Peliyagoda
- South end: New Kelani Bridge and Colombo.

Location
- Country: Sri Lanka

Highway system
- Roads in Sri Lanka; Expressways; A-Grade; B-Grade

The Colombo–Katunayake Expressway E03 is Sri Lanka's second E Class highway. The 25.8-kilometre-long (16.0 mi) highway links the Sri Lankan capital Colombo with Bandaranaike International Airport, Katunayake and Negombo. Construction on the highway began in October 2009, and it was opened on 27 October 2013, by former president Mahinda Rajapaksa. The highway has three lanes each way from Colombo to Peliyagoda, and two lanes each way from Peliyagoda to Katunayake, with the width ranging from 26 to 33.5 metres (85 to 110 ft).

The total cost of the project was US $292 million. Exim Bank of China funded US$248.2 million of the total cost and the government of Sri Lanka spent US$45 million on the project.

The speed limit is 80 km/h (50 mph) for the first eight kilometres (5.0 mi) and 100 km/h (62 mph) for the rest of the road. The Expressway has 42 bridges and 88 culverts including a 480 metre long viaduct at Hunupitiya and an 800-metre viaduct at Katunayake. The opening of the highway has allowed people to travel between Colombo, the commercial capital of Sri Lanka, and Katunayake, the major international airport of Sri Lanka, within 15 minutes.

The E03 expressway links the capital Colombo with one of the major commercial hubs in the country and the major tourist destination, Negombo, within 20 minutes. The Sri Lanka Transport Board (SLTB) has also commenced a luxury bus service on the road, conducting services between Colombo and Negombo.

== History ==
The contract was awarded to China Metallurgical Group Corporation (MCC) by the Government of Sri Lanka and the agreement was signed on 17 August 2008. The project loan agreements were signed on 6 August 2009 and the construction commenced on 18 August 2009. The expressway was opened on 27 October 2013 by President Mahinda Rajapaksa.

== Interchanges ==
1. New Kelani Bridge Interchange
2. Peliyagoda Interchange
3. Kerawalapitiya Interchange (connect with E02 Outer Circular Expressway)
4. Ja-Ela Interchange
5. Katunayake Interchange

== Gallery ==
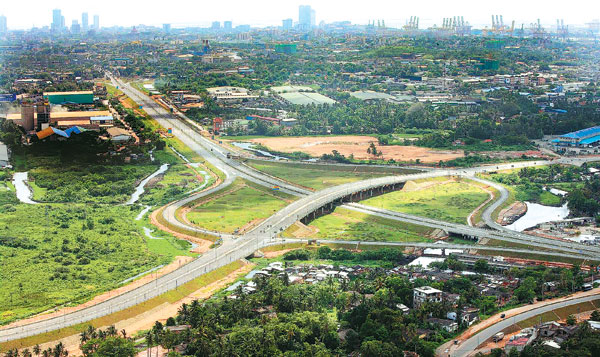
Birds-Eye Shot of CKE

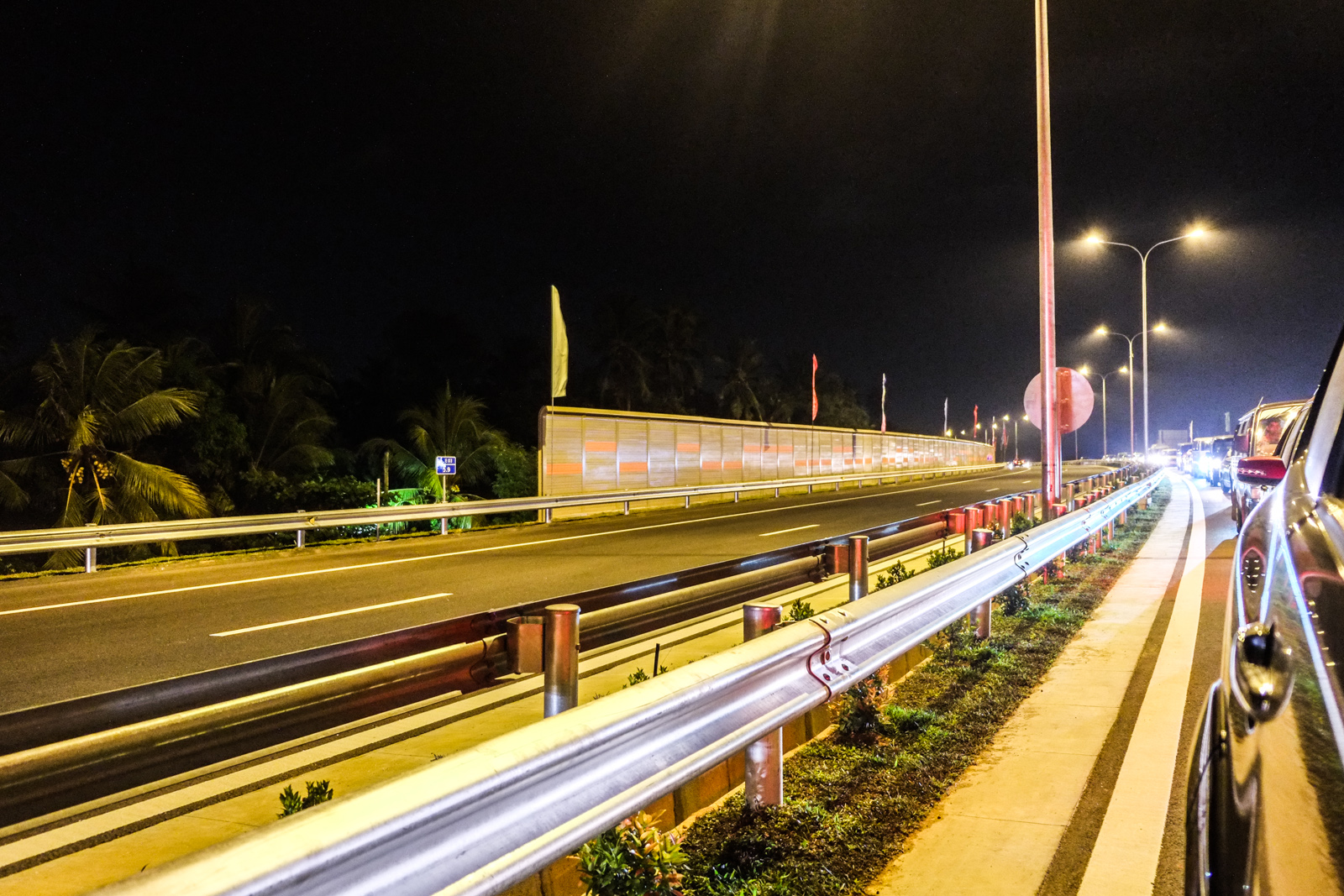
CKE at night

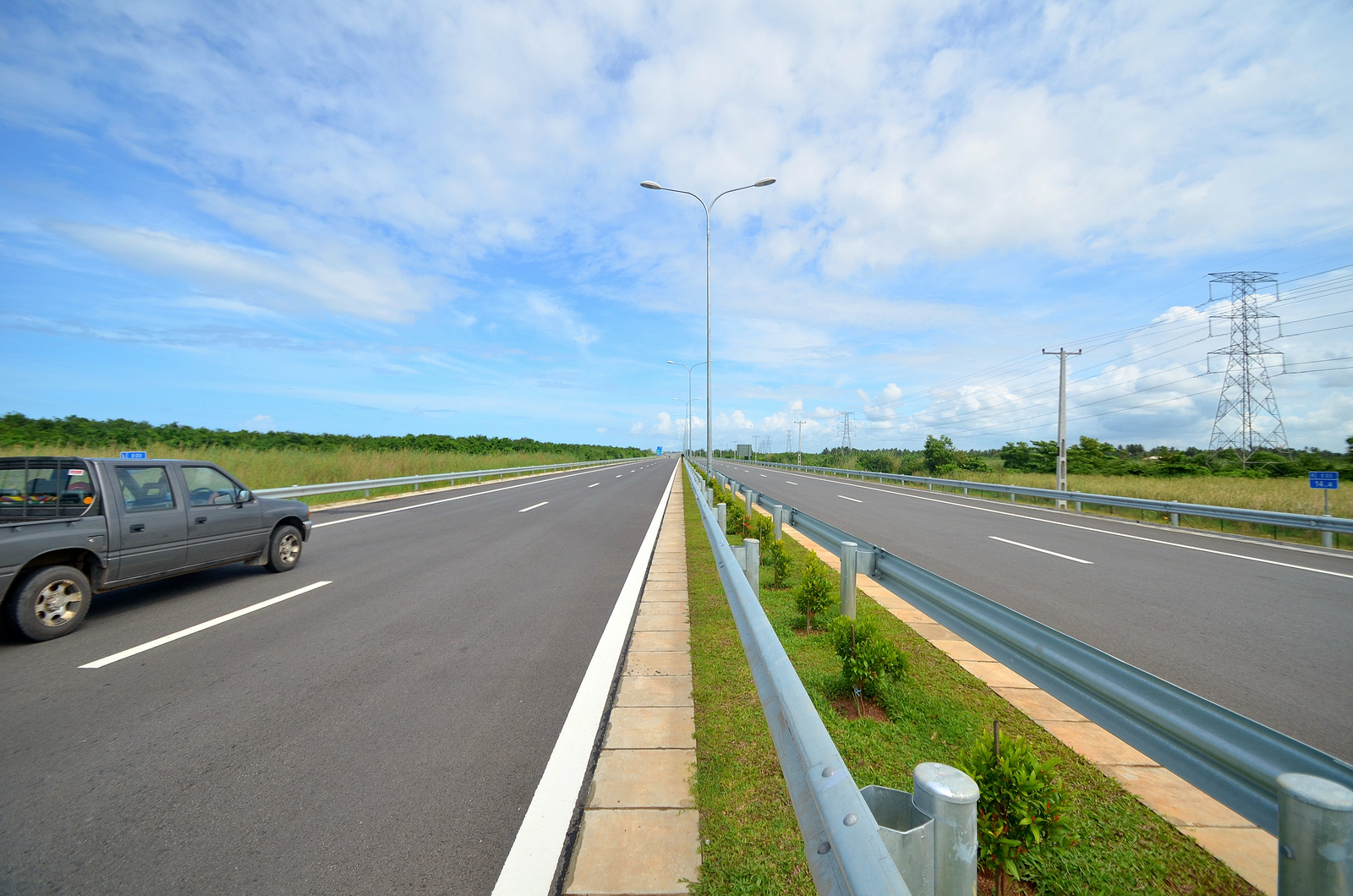
CKE

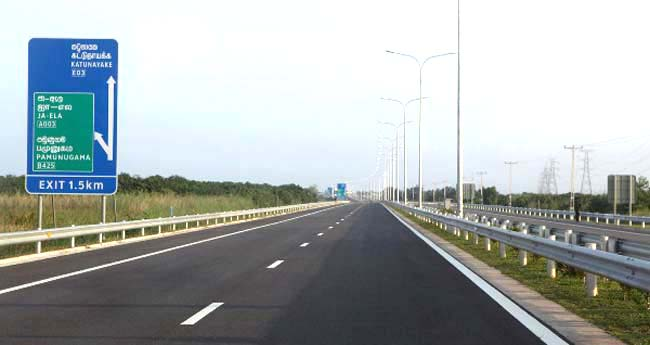
Colombo Katunayake Expressway declared open

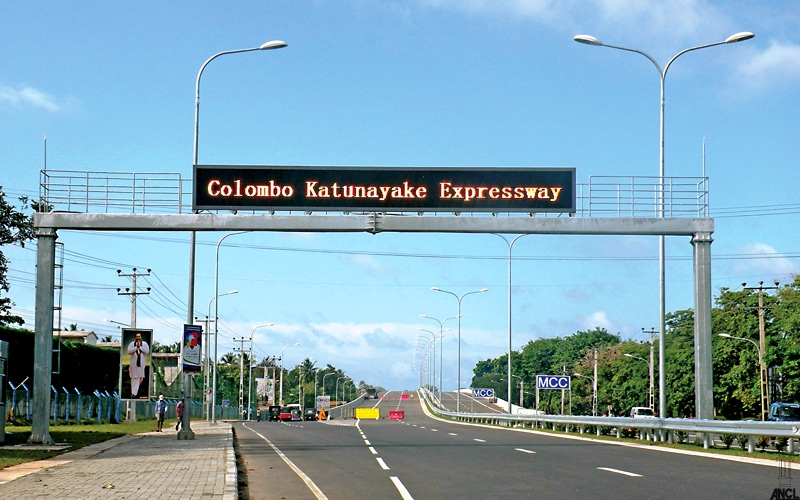
Display Sign on CKE

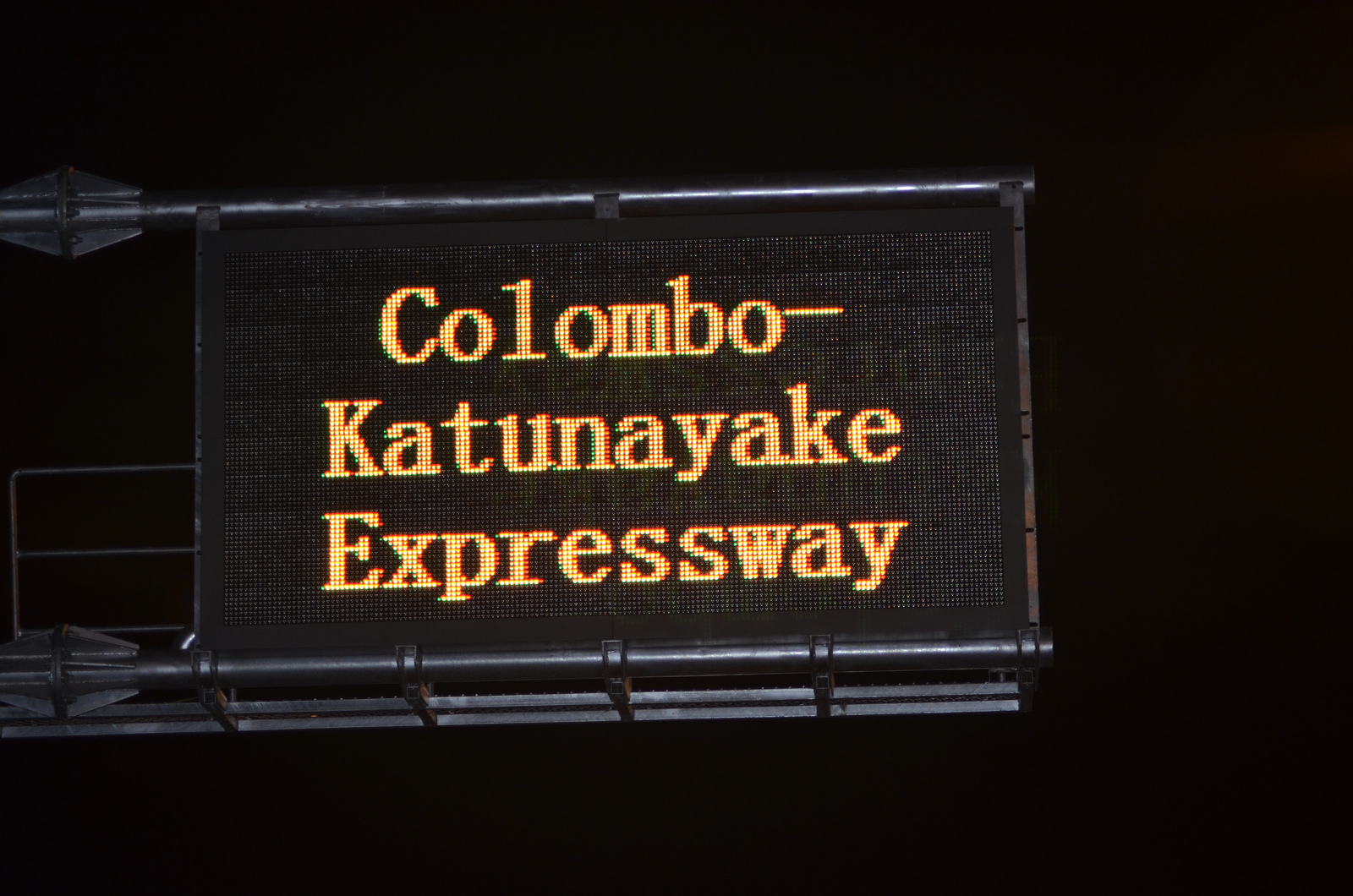
Electronic Display Sign - CKE

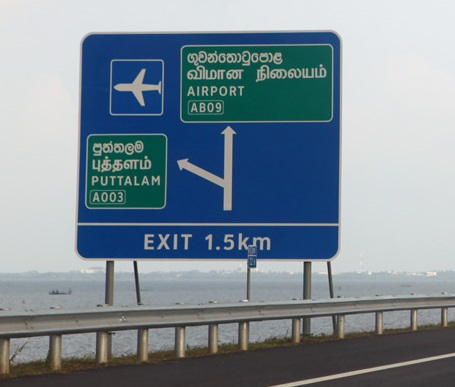
A road sign

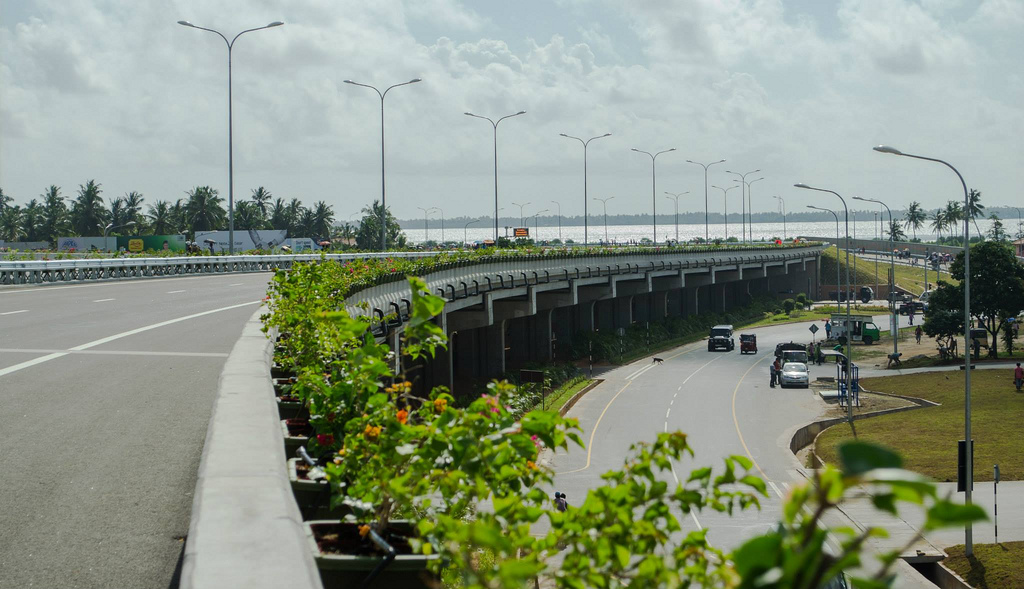
Elevated section of the CKE

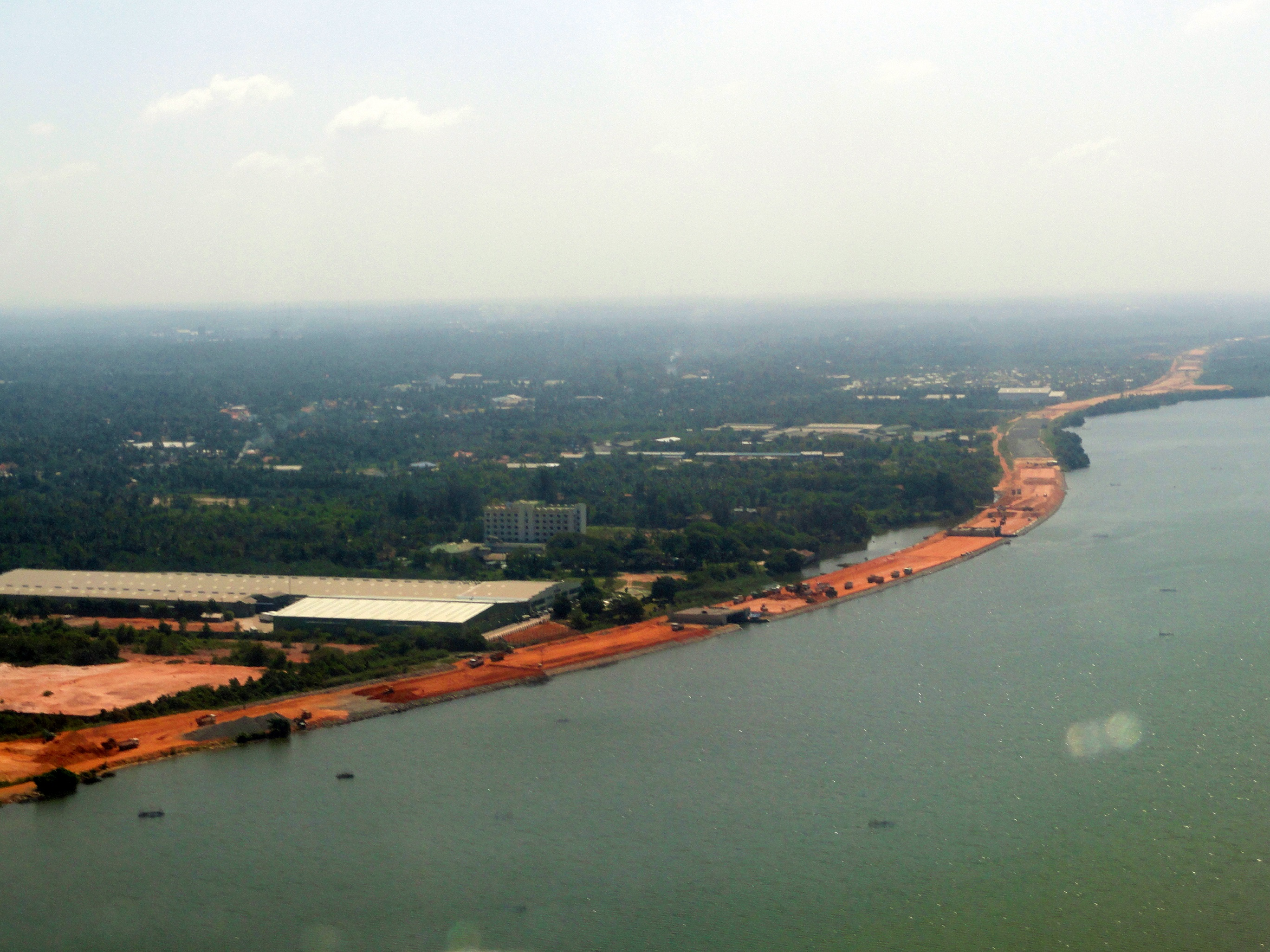
CKE under construction in 2012.

== See also ==
- List of A-Grade highways in Sri Lanka
