= Kerawalapitiya =

Kerawalpitiya කෙරවලපිටිය கெரவலப்பிட்டி
- Suburb
- Location within Sri Lanka
- Coordinates: 7°1′0″N 79°53′0″E
- Country: Sri Lanka
- Province: Western Province
- Time zone: UTC+5:30 (Sri Lanka Standard Time Zone)
- Area code: 011

Kerawalapitiya is a suburb of Wattala, which acts an interchange to connect the Airport Expressway and the OCE-Expressway. In December 2025, the government of Sri Lanka issued orders to pause collection of toll taxes at the Kerawalapitiya interchange.

Kerawalapitiya has opened an icon for Sri Lanka's largest privately owned power station, the Yugadanavi Power Station. In 2025 it was reported that another 300 MW power station in the suburb is underway. It also has the country's major solid waste disposal site.
