= W. S. Karunaratne =

Sri Lankan Buddhist scholar (1928 – 1986)

Wijesinghe Sugathadasa
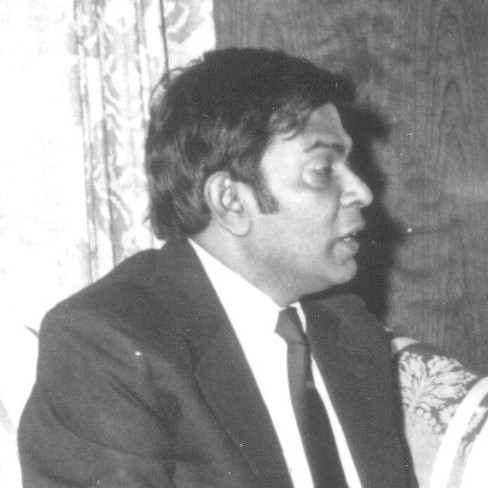
- Wijesinghe Sugathadasa Karunaratne, renowned Buddhist scholar (1928–1986).
- Born: 24 December 1928; Kandy, British Ceylon
- Died: 1986; Colombo, Sri Lanka
- Citizenship: Sri Lanka
- Education: University of London
- Alma mater: Ananda College, University of Peradeniya, University of London
- Occupations: Academic, diplomat
- Known for: Scholarly works of Buddhist philosophy and comparative religion
- Notable work: Theory of Causality
- Title: Professor, Ambassador
- Spouse: Indumathi Gunathilaka
- Children: Shantarakshita, Kamalaseeli, Chandrakeerthi, Harsha
- Parent(s): Don Charles Karunaratne and Donna Charlinton Dissanayake

Wijesinghe Sugathadasa Karunaratne (24 December 1928 – 1986) was a Sri Lankan scholar of Buddhism who was known as “W. S.” by Sri Lankans and “The Don” in academic circles.

== Early years ==
Karunaratne was born in Katugastota, a small village in the Kandy district of Sri Lanka. One of nine siblings, he grew up in a poor family that moved frequently due to his father's job as a police constable during the British colonial rule of Sri Lanka.

Karunaratne initially attended Dharmaraja College but attended many different schools due to his father's transfers. While attending Ananda College (the Buddhist school founded by Col. Henry Steel Olcott), Karunaratne sat for the university entrance exam and achieved the highest grade in the country, winning the Moulana Prize and narrowly surpassing Felix Dias Bandaranaike.

== Education ==
Karunaratne entered the University of Ceylon in 1948, where he received numerous scholarships and graduated with a Bachelor of Arts with First-Class Honors in 1952. Although Karunaratne's father wanted him to join the Ceylon Civil Service, his professors convinced him to become an assistant lecturer in the Department of Pali and Buddhist Civilization at the university's Peradeniya Campus (which became the University of Peradeniya in 1978). In 1954, Karunaratne married Indumathi Gunatillake, one of his students, who later became an expert in Tibetan Buddhism and an assistant editor for the Sri Lanka Encyclopedia of Buddhism. Soon after their wedding, Karunaratne and his wife moved to London, England, where, at age 28, Karunaratne earned his doctorate from the University of London for his thesis on "The Theory of Causality in Early Buddhism". In the same year, Karunaratne was awarded the F. L. Woodward Prize from the School of Oriental and African Studies.

== Buddhist studies ==
Twelve years later, the Department of Pali and Buddhist Civilization considered establishing a separate department of Buddhist Philosophy. In 1964, Karunaratne was chosen as its first professor (over Reverend Dr. Walpola Rahula). This made him the youngest professor at the University of Ceylon. He established and developed the new department, teaching at the Peradeniya Campus until 1973. During his final years at Peradeniya, he also served as the dean of the Faculty of Arts.

In the 1970s, the university underwent a transformation, and the Arts faculty was moved to the Vidyalankara Campus in Kelaniya. From 1973 to 1978, Professor Karunaratne remained the dean of the Faculty of Arts at Vidyalankara, as well as the Buddhist philosophy chair. Additionally, he was a member of the transitional University of Sri Lanka's board of regents.

== Diplomacy ==
In 1978, President J. R. Jayewardene invited Karunaratne to serve as Sri Lanka's ambassador to the United States. Karunaratne took a leave of absence from the university to accept the position in Washington, D.C. After serving as ambassador to the United States and United Mexican States, he returned to teaching at the Vidyalankara Campus until his death in 1986.

== Politics ==
After the '1956 revolution', Karunaratne became involved in Sri Lanka's national politics. He became a confidant of statesman Philip Gunawardena of the Mahajana Eksath Peramuna (MEP) and traveled throughout the country giving speeches on behalf of the MEP. In the March 1960 national elections, Karunaratne contested the Kandy electorate, running against E.L. Senanayake of the United National Party (UNP). Karunaratne lost the election by a few hundred votes and returned to university. In 1970, Dudley Senanayake persuaded Karunaratne to run in Senanayake's home electorate for the UNP, but he again lost by a narrow margin and returned to his academic profession. In 1978, Karunaratne accepted an invitation from J.R. Jayewardene to become the UNP's chief spokesperson. He campaigned across the country, making political speeches to support Jayewardene.

== Contributions ==
Karunaratne was fluent in Sinhala, Tamil and English, as well as the classical languages of Pali, Sanskrit, and Latin. He also read Hindi, French, German, and Burmese. He was a visiting professor in the United States in 1963, lecturing at numerous universities as a Fulbright Scholar. Before that, he taught at the University of Rangoon in Burma and at other higher education institutions in Thailand. Professor Karunaratne traveled extensively around the world in various official capacities as an expert on comparative religion. He contributed to newspapers, magazines, and scholarly publications on various topics. As an avid collector of rare books on Buddhism in various languages, he compiled an extensive library. After his death in 1986, his book collection, including rare and ancient Burmese and Pali manuscripts (some written on ola leaves), was donated by his family to the Buddhist and Pali University of Sri Lanka and other higher education institutions. His widow compiled some of his writings and published five books in Sinhala and English:

- Buddhism, its Religion and Philosophy
- The Theory of Causality in Early Buddhism
- The Way of the Lotus
- Bauddha Dharshanaya saha Charanaya
- Bauddha Adhyayana Shashthreeya Leekhana Sangrahaya.

== Gallery ==
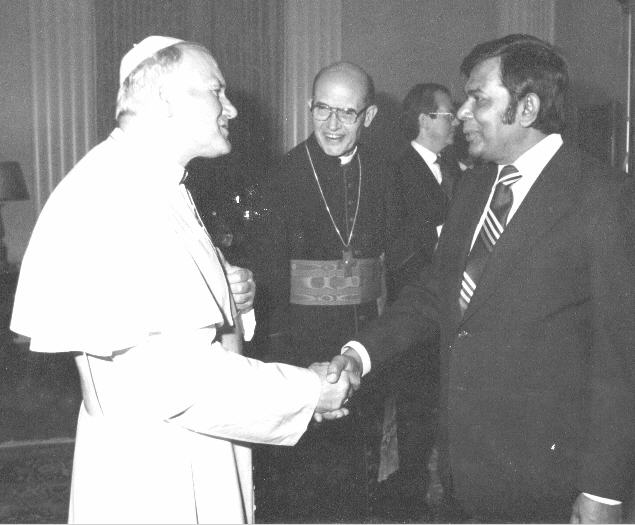
Meeting late Pope John Paul II

Discuss Human Rights issues with Secretary of State Warren Christopher

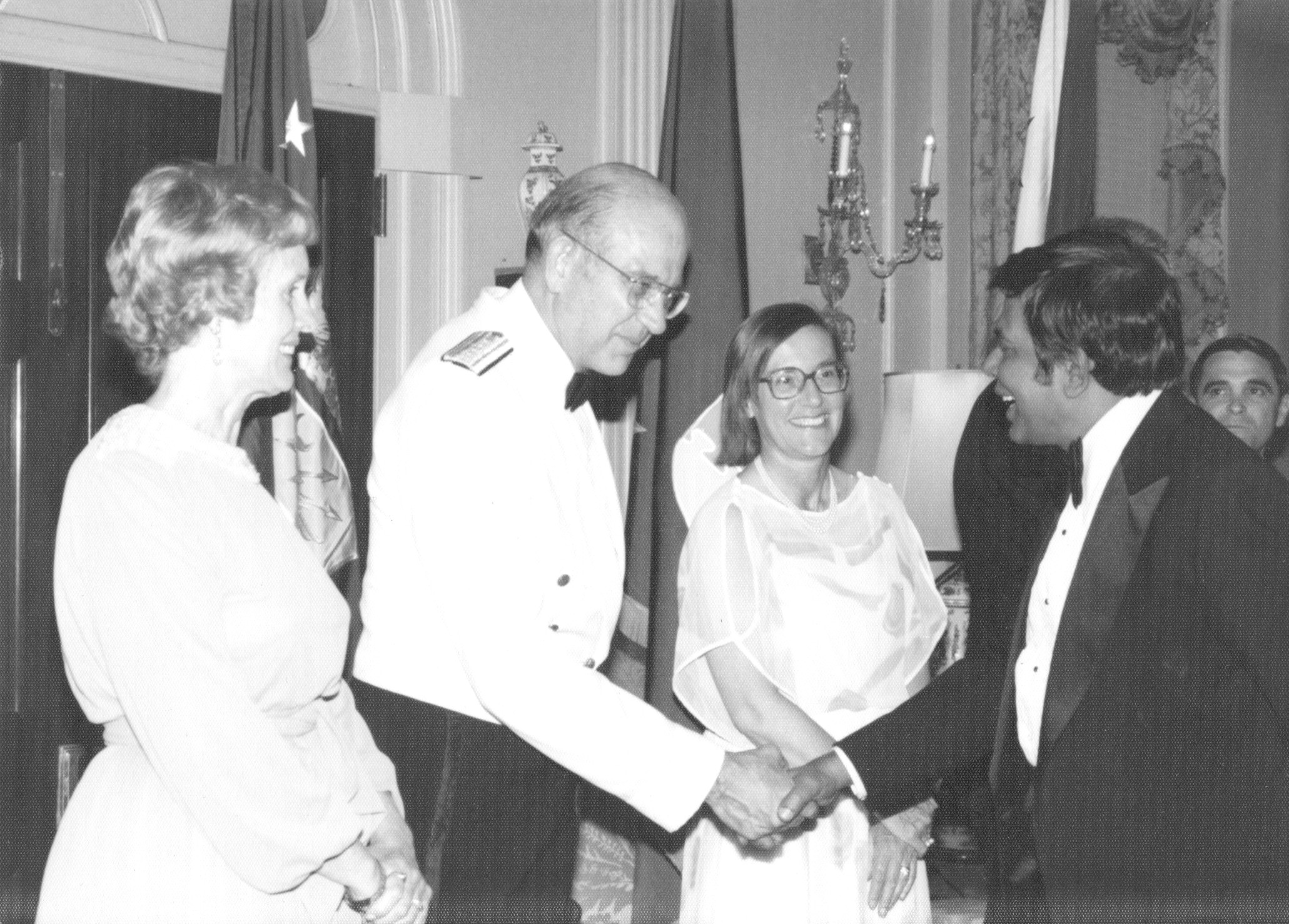
Calling on US Military leaders

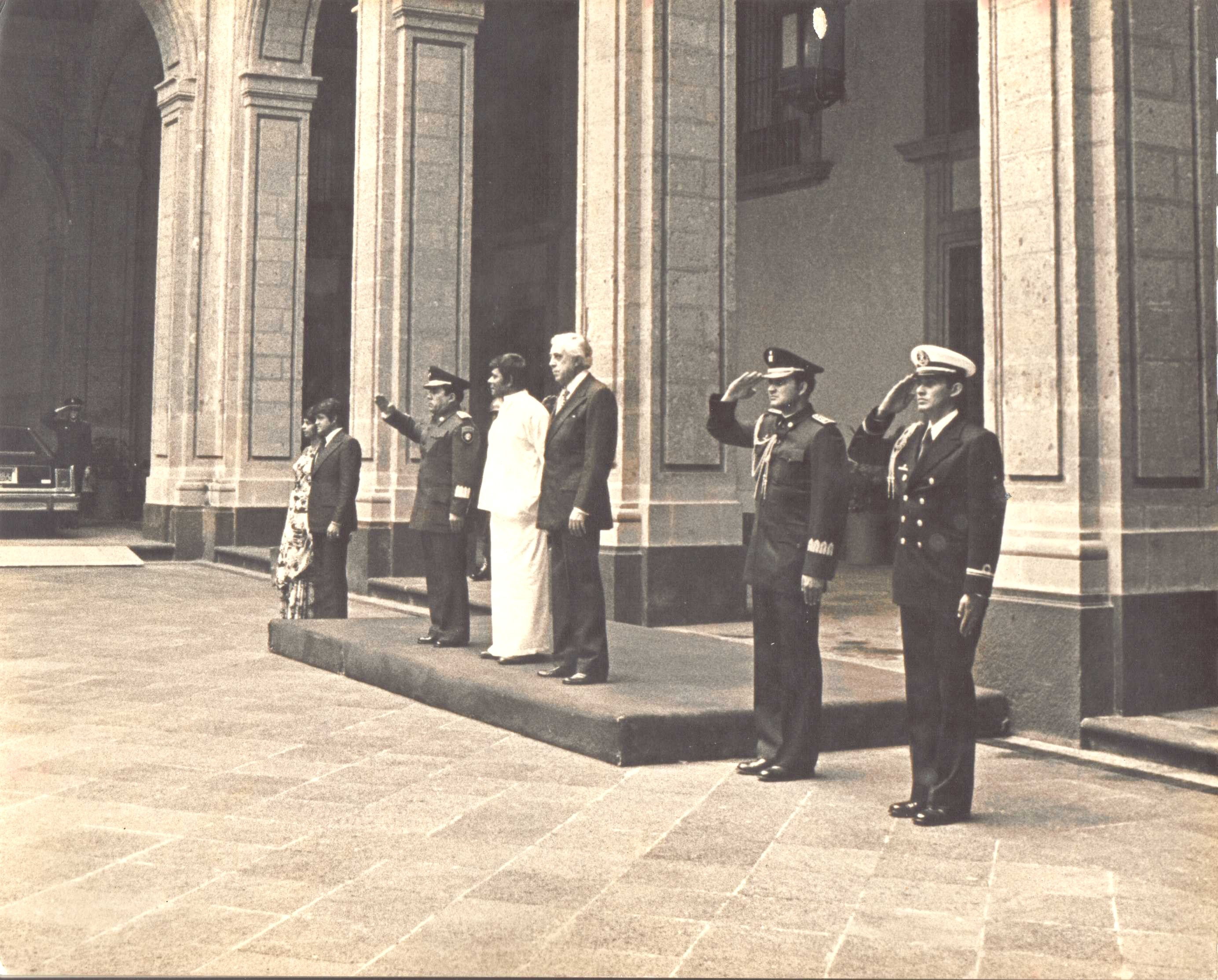
Observing Honor Guard at the Mexican Presidential Palace

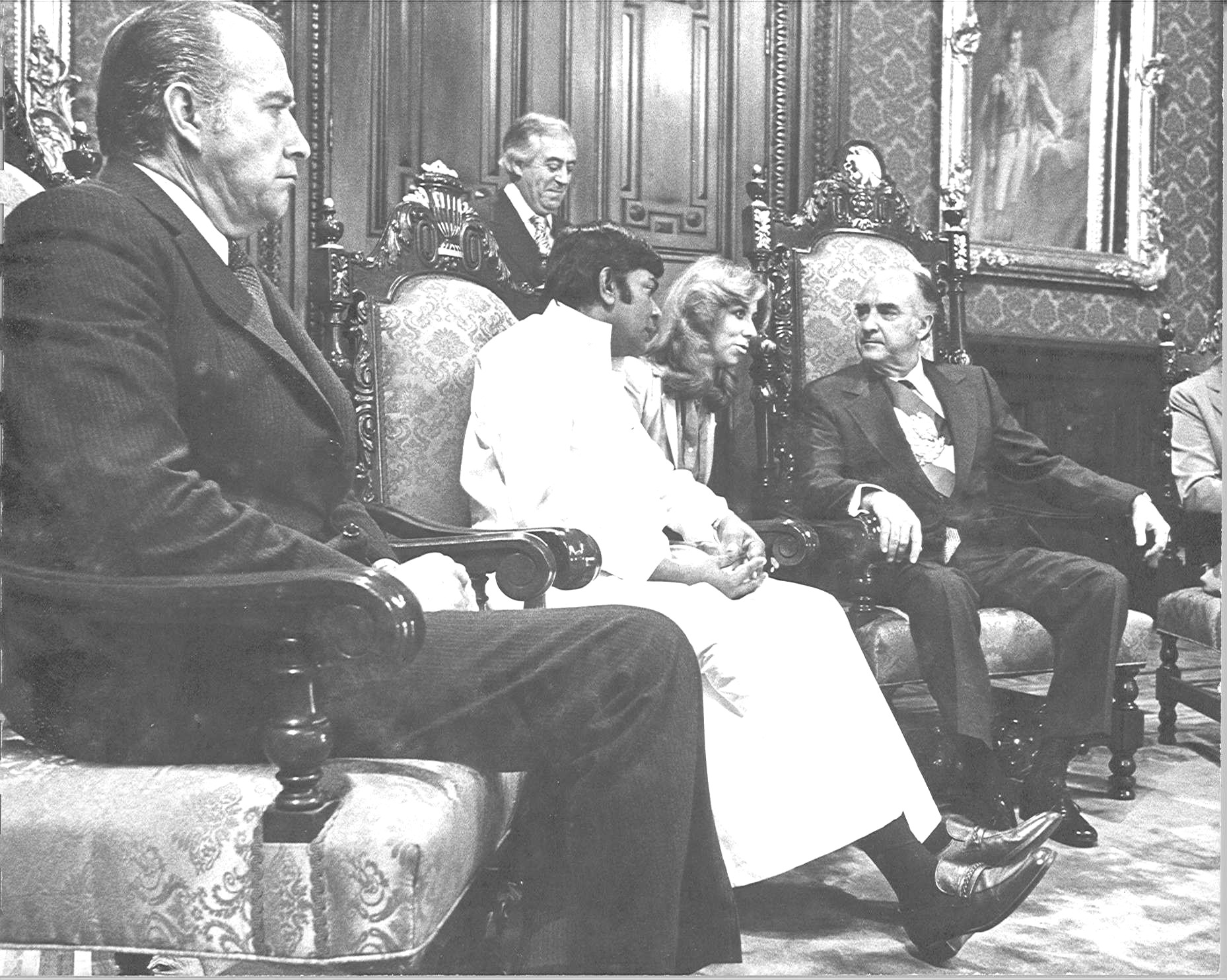
Meeting with Mexican President José López Portillo

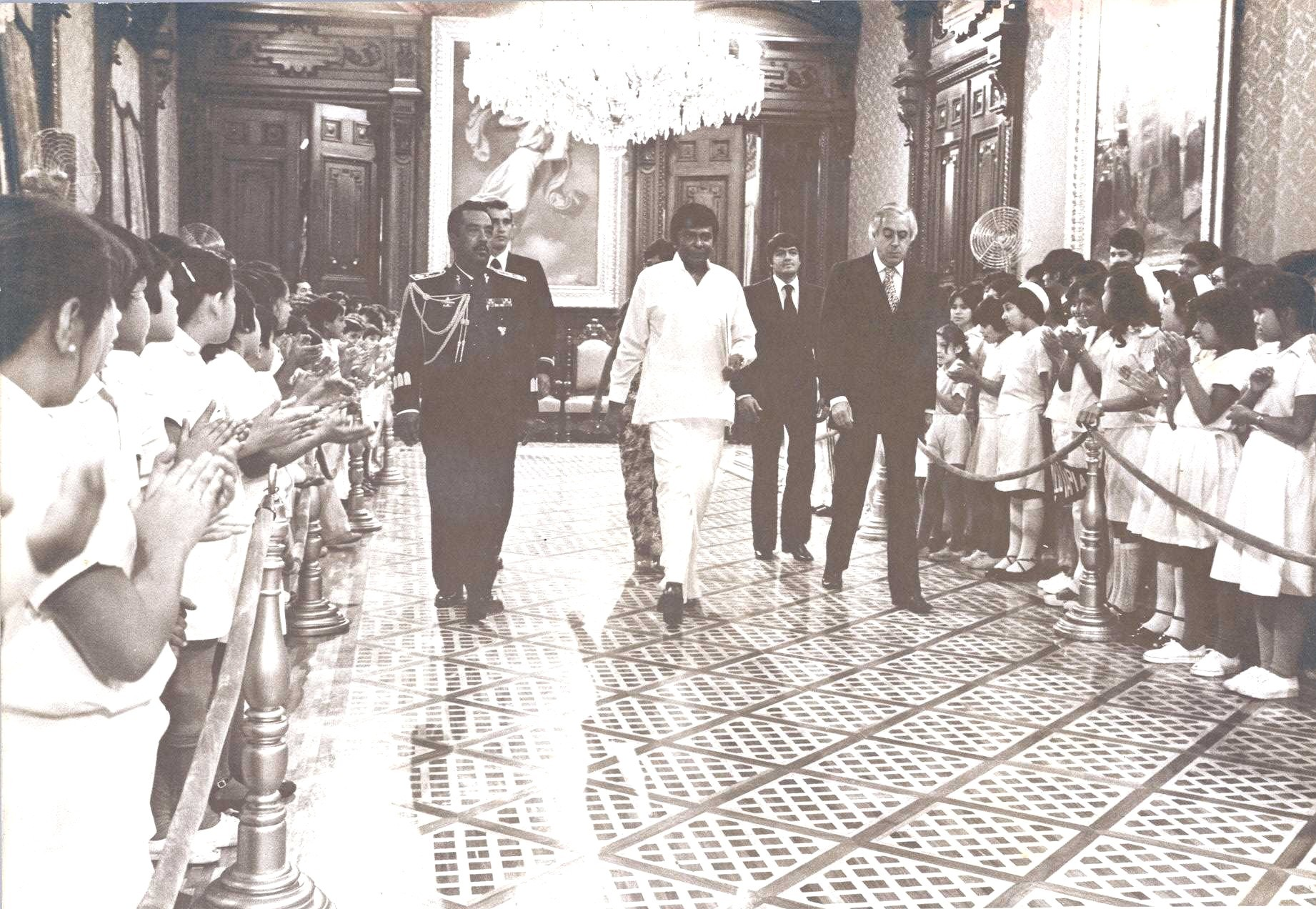
Greeted by school children at the Mexican Presidential Palace

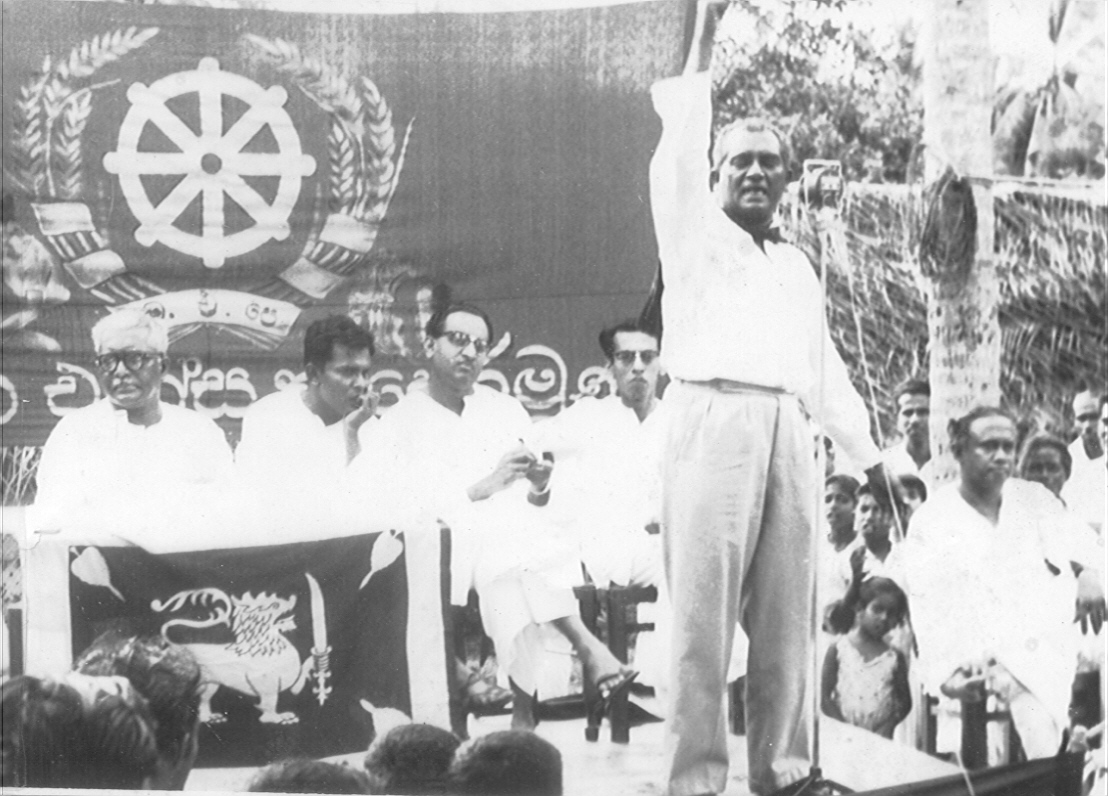
Peoples United Front (MEP) days with Robert Gunawardena

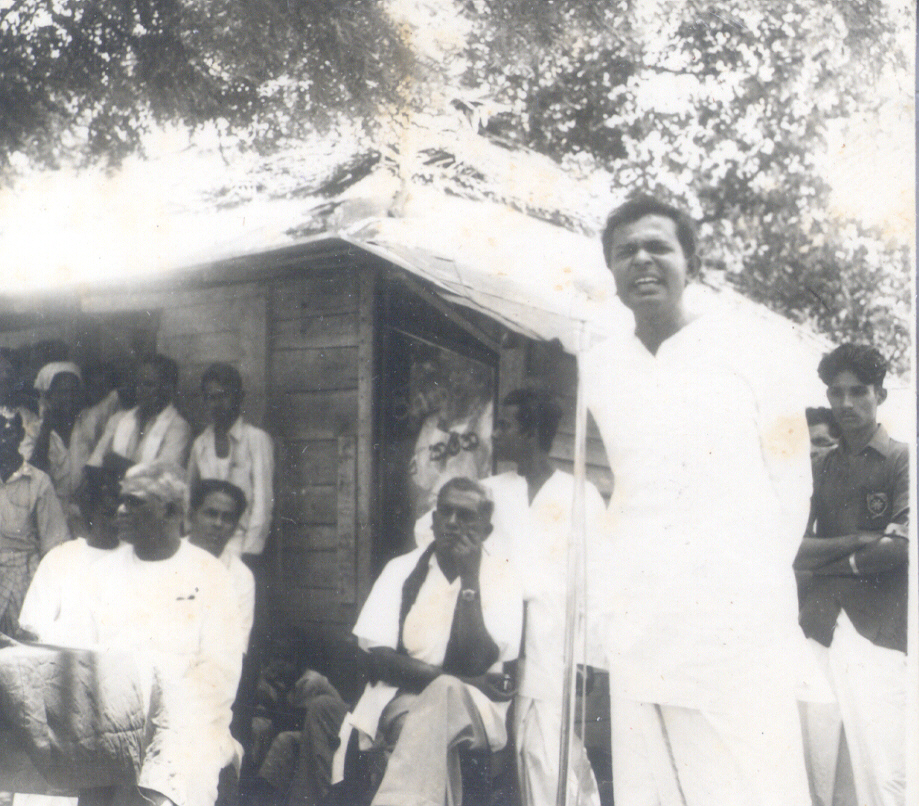
Addressing rural villagers

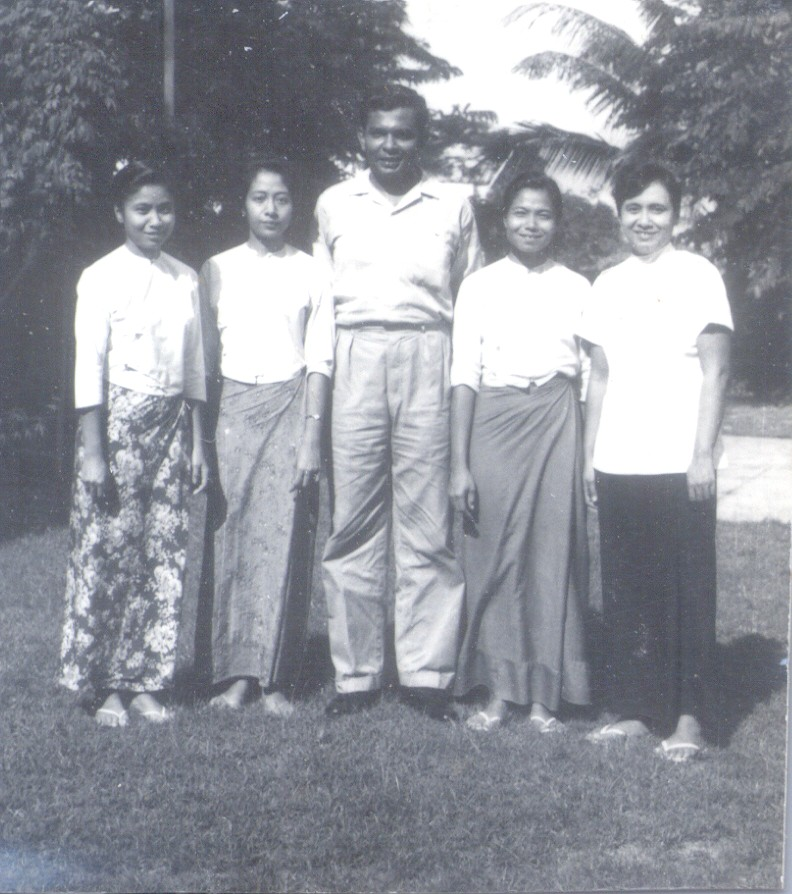
With University students at Rangoon University, Burma

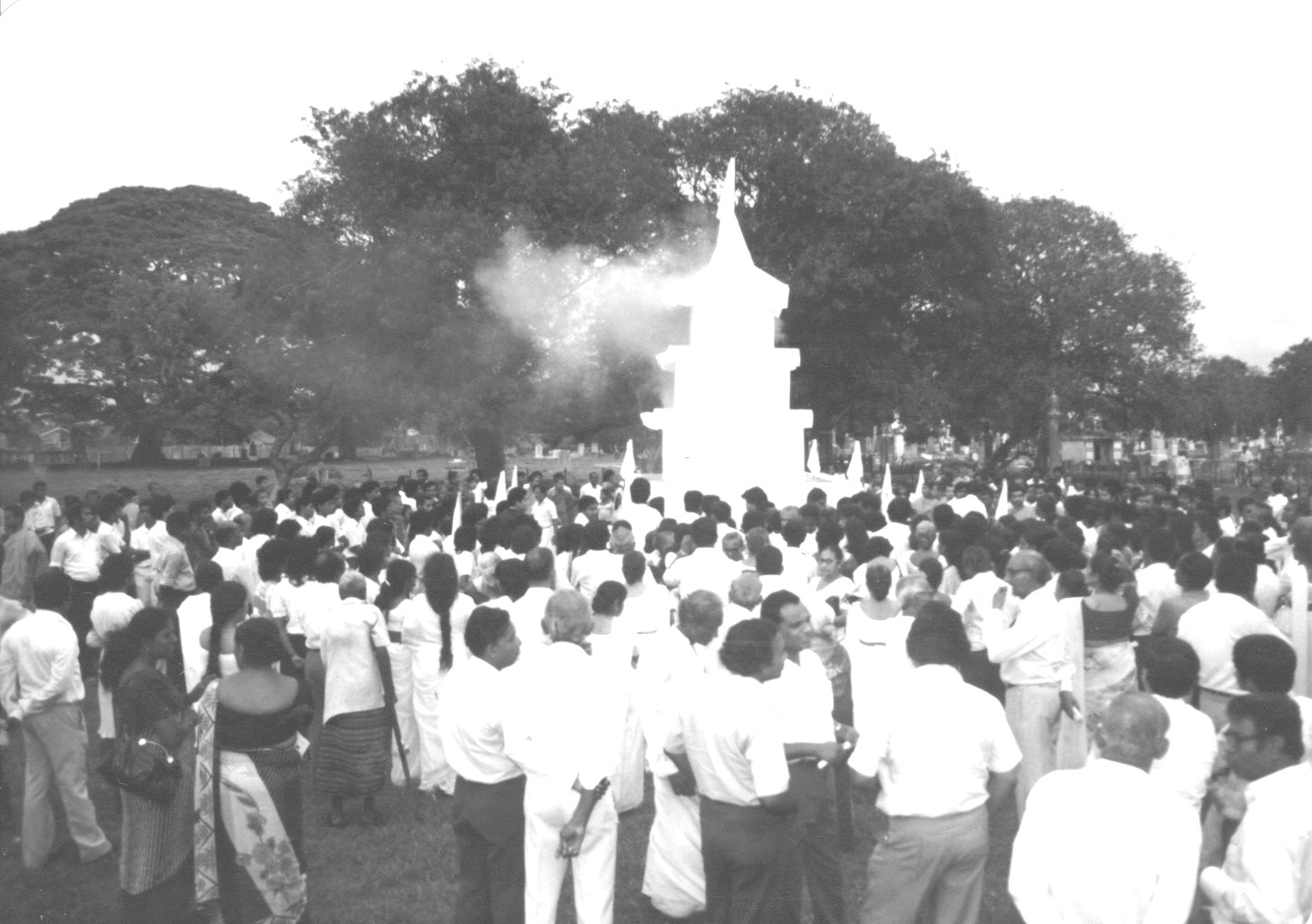
Funeral Pyre

== Speeches ==
- Addressing members of the 8th Sri Lanka Parliament
- Sara Dharma', addressing Sri Lanka Central Bank staff

== See also ==
- Sri Lankan Non Career Diplomats
