= Mirigama =

Mirigama මීරිගම மீரிகம
- Location within Sri Lanka
- Coordinates: 7°14′29″N 80°7′57″E
- Country: Sri Lanka
- Province: Western Province, Sri Lanka
- District: Gampaha District, Sri Lanka

Mirigama (also spelled Meerigama) (Sinhala: මීරිගම; Tamil: மீரிகம) is a Town in Gampaha District, Sri Lanka. It is located 57 km (35 mi) from Colombo, 46 km (29 mi) from Kurunegala and 34 km (21 mi) from Negombo.

Mirigama is the hometown of Sri Lanka's first Prime Minister, D. S. Senanayake and former speaker of the Parliament of Sri Lanka Karu Jayasuriya.

The Central Expressway (under construction as of June 2018) includes two interchanges serving Mirigama: Mirigama North and Mirigama South.

== Etymology ==
Mirigama is a derivation of mihiri-gama, meaning sweet place. According to local mythology, King Walagamba had heard his win against a local ruler when he was in the area, and named the village Mirigama, as that's where he heard the "sweet" news.

== Geography ==
The town is situated in a undulating plain with surrounding hills.

== Notable places ==
- SLAF Mirigama
- The Mirigama Super Race Track (commonly known as the Kanway Autodrome) - national-level race track, 1.4 km (0.87 mi) in length.
- Sri Lanka Army Base, Ambepussa

== Notable people ==
- D.S. Senanayake, 1st Prime Minister of Ceylon
- Karu Jayasuriya, MP, former Speaker of the Parliament of Sri Lanka
- Mahendra Wijerathne, MP
- Udena Wijerathne, MP
- Dudley Senanayake, 2nd prime minister of Sri Lanka
