= Bentara-Elpitiya Electoral District =

Former Sri Lanka electoral district

Bentara-Elpitiya electoral district was an electoral district of Sri Lanka between March 1960 and February 1989. The district was named after the towns of Bentara(Bentota) and Elpitiya in Galle District, Southern Province. The 1978 Constitution of Sri Lanka introduced the proportional representation electoral system for electing members of Parliament. The existing 160 mainly single-member electoral districts were replaced with 22 multi-member electoral districts. Bentara-Elpitiya electoral district was replaced by the Galle multi-member electoral district at the 1989 general elections.

== Members of Parliament ==
Key

Independent SLFP UNP

Election	Member	Party	Term
1960 (March)	R. G. Samaranayake	United National Party	1960
1960 (July)	Albert Kariyawasam	Sri Lanka Freedom Party	1960-1965
1965	R. G. Samaranayake	United National Party	1965-1966
1966 parliamentary by-election	Albert Kariyawasam	Sri Lanka Freedom Party	1966-1970
1970	Albert Kariyawasam	Sri Lanka Freedom Party	1970-1977
1977	Rupasena Karunatillake	United National Party	1977-1989

== Elections ==
=== 1960 (March) Parliamentary General Election ===
Results of the 4th parliamentary election held on 19 March 1960:

Candidate	Party	Symbol	Votes	%
R. G. Samaranayake	United National Party	Elephant	7,769	24.03
Albert Kariyawasam	Mahajana Eksath Peramuna	Cartwheel	7,177	22.20
Henry Abeywickrema	Sri Lanka Freedom Party	Hand	4,319	13.36
Leslie Sirimanne		Sun	3,727	11.53
K. A. Wimalapala	Communist Party of Ceylon	Star	3,678	11.37
J. D. A. Jayasekera		Mortar	1,652	5.11
K. Surasena	Lanka Sama Samaja Party	Key	1,522	4.71
P. A. Premadasa		Cockrel	1,141	3.53
D. B. Wickrema Arachchi		Umbrella	804	2.49
D. K. Mahavithana		Lamp	192	0.59
P. A. Dharmasena Wijeratne		Eye	180	0.56
Valid Votes			32,161	99.46
Rejected Votes			175	0.54
Total Polled			32,336	100.00
Registered Electors			41,412	
Turnout				78.08

=== 1960 (July) Parliamentary General Election ===
Results of the 5th parliamentary election held on 20 July 1960:

Candidate	Party	Symbol	Votes	%
Albert Kariyawasam	Sri Lanka Freedom Party	Hand	18,349	58.03
R. G. Samaranayake	United National Party	Elephant	12,362	39.10
J. D. A. Jayasekera	Mahajana Eksath Peramuna	Cartwheel	819	2.59
Valid Votes			31,530	99.72
Rejected Votes			88	0.28
Total Polled			31,618	100.00
Registered Electors			41,412	
Turnout				76.35

=== 1965 Parliamentary General Election ===
Results of the 6th parliamentary election held on 22 March 1965:

Candidate	Party	Symbol	Votes	%
R. G. Samaranayake	United National Party	Elephant	22,085	49.47
Albert Kariyawasam	Sri Lanka Freedom Party	Hand	21,084	47.23
J. P. Gajanayake	Mahajana Eksath Peramuna	Cartwheel	1,172	2.63
Valid Votes			44,341	99.32
Rejected Votes			304	0.68
Total Polled			44,645	100.00
Registered Electors			52,449	
Turnout				85.12

=== 1966 Parliamentary By-Election ===
Results of the parliamentary by-election, held on 24 October 1966:

Candidate	Party	Symbol	Votes	%
Albert Kariyawasam	Sri Lanka Freedom Party	Hand	24,132	51.57
C. W. Samaranayaka	United National Party	Elephant	22,455	47.99
Valid Votes			46,587	99.56
Rejected Votes			206	0.44
Total Polled			46,793	100.00
Registered Electors			56,158	
Turnout				83.32

=== 1970 Parliamentary General Election ===
Results of the 7th parliamentary election held on 27 May 1970:

Candidate	Party	Symbol	Votes	%
Albert Kariyawasam	Sri Lanka Freedom Party	Hand	29,801	56.63
Rupasena Karunatillake	United National Party	Elephant	22,709	43.15
Valid Votes			52,510	99.78
Rejected Votes			114	0.22
Total Polled			52,624	100.00
Registered Electors			59,022	
Turnout				89.16

=== 1977 Parliamentary General Election ===
Results of the 8th parliamentary election held on 21 July 1977:

Candidate	Party	Symbol	Votes	%
Rupasena Karunatillake	United National Party	Elephant	26,679	59.61
Albert Kariyawasam	Sri Lanka Freedom Party	Hand	14,825	33.12
Peter Jayasekera	Communist Party of Ceylon	Star	2,842	6.35
Sirisena Jayasekera		Lamp	109	0.24
K. A. Chandrasena		Eye	97	0.22
Ariyadasa P. Thanthrige		Umbrella	76	0.17
Valid Votes			44,628	99.71
Rejected Votes			130	0.29
Total Polled			44,758	100.00
Registered Electors			51,656	
Turnout				86.65
