= Pilana Raja Maha Vihara =

Buddhist temple in Galle, Sri Lanka

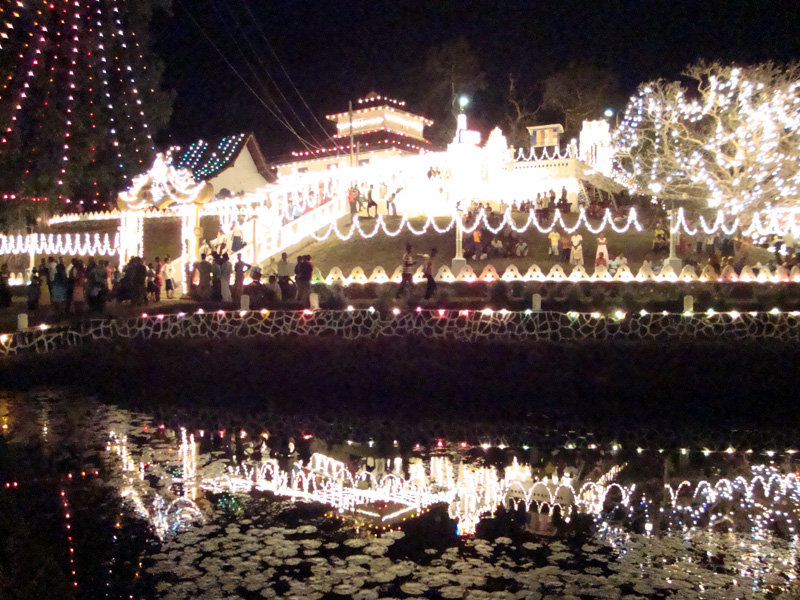

Religion
- Affiliation: Buddhism

Location
- Country: Sri Lanka
- Interactive map of Pilana Raja Maha Vihara
- Coordinates: 6.0376711°N 80.2932781°E

The Pilana Raja Maha Vihara or Pilana Temple is a Buddhist temple in Galle, Sri Lanka. The chief incumbent is Meepe Wagira Thera. The temple is well known in the southern part of the island for its historical Perahera festival.

== Location ==
The Pilana Raja Maha Vihara is located in the Galle District, near the Galle–Akuressa Highway (A17), about 11 km (6.8 mi) from Galle. The temple is situated on a small hill surrounded by paddy fields, and is visible from the Galle–Akuressa Highway.
