= Kariyawasam =

Kariyawasam is a surname. Notable people with the surname include:

- Akila Viraj Kariyawasam (born 1973), Sri Lankan politician
- Albert Kariyawasam (born 1921), Sri Lankan politician
- Gayathri Kariyawasam (born 1976), Sri Lankan cricketer
- Nimesh Kariyawasam (born 1994), Sri Lankan cricketer
- Nipuna Kariyawasam (born 1991), Sri Lankan cricketer
- Pradeep Kariyawasam (fl. 2009), Sri Lankan businessman
- Prasad Kariyawasam (born 1954), Sri Lankan diplomat
- Sagara Kariyawasam (born 1967), Sri Lankan lawyer and politician
- Sarala Kariyawasam (born 1996), Sri Lankan actress
