= Madu Ganga =

Madu Ganga Madu River
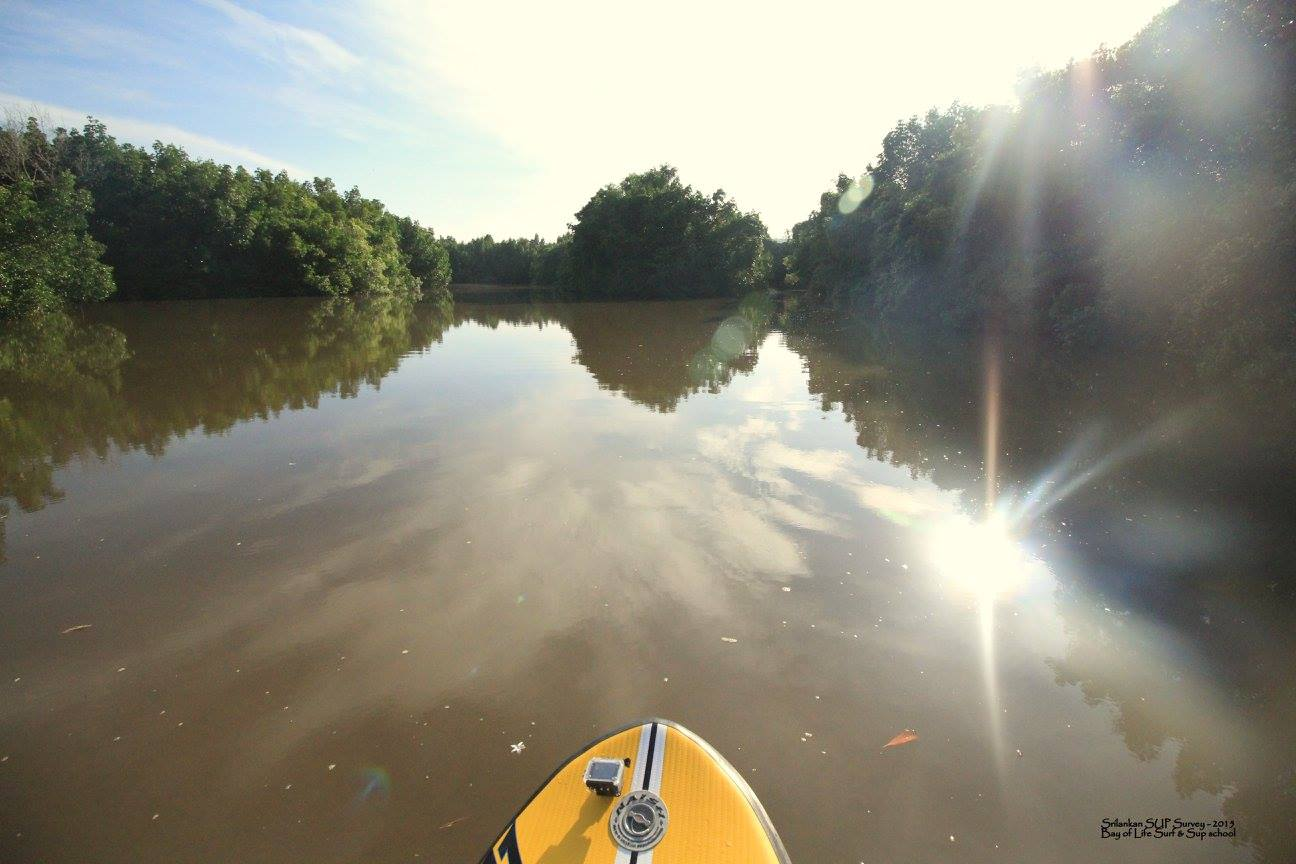

Location
- Country: Sri Lanka
- Province: Southern Province

Physical characteristics
- Source
  - location: Uragasmanhandiya
- Mouth: Indian Ocean
  - location: Balapitiya
  - coordinates: 06°16′25″N 80°02′05″E

Basin features
- Landmarks: Kothduwa temple

Ramsar Wetland
- Official name: Maduganga
- Designated: 11 December 2003
- Reference no.: 1372

The Madu Ganga is a minor watercourse which originates near Uragasmanhandiya in the Galle District of Sri Lanka, before widening into the Madu Ganga Lake at Balapitiya. The river then flows for a further a 4.4 km (2.7 mi) before draining into the Indian Ocean. It is located 88 km (55 mi) south of Colombo and 35 km (22 mi) north of Galle.

The Buddhist Amarapura Nikaya sect had its first upasampada (higher ordination ceremony) on a fleet of boats anchored upon the Madu Ganga in 1803. The Buddhist Kothduwa temple is situated on an isolated island in the lake.

Madu Ganga Lake, together with the smaller Randombe Lake, to which it is connected by two narrow channels, forms the Madu Ganga wetland. It's estuary and the many mangrove islets on it constitute a complex coastal wetland ecosystem. It has a high ecological, biological and aesthetic significance, being home to approximately 303 species of plants belonging to 95 families and to 248 species of vertebrate animals. The inhabitants of its islets produce peeled cinnamon and cinnamon oil.

The Madu Ganga Wetland was formally declared in 2003, in terms of the Ramsar Convention.

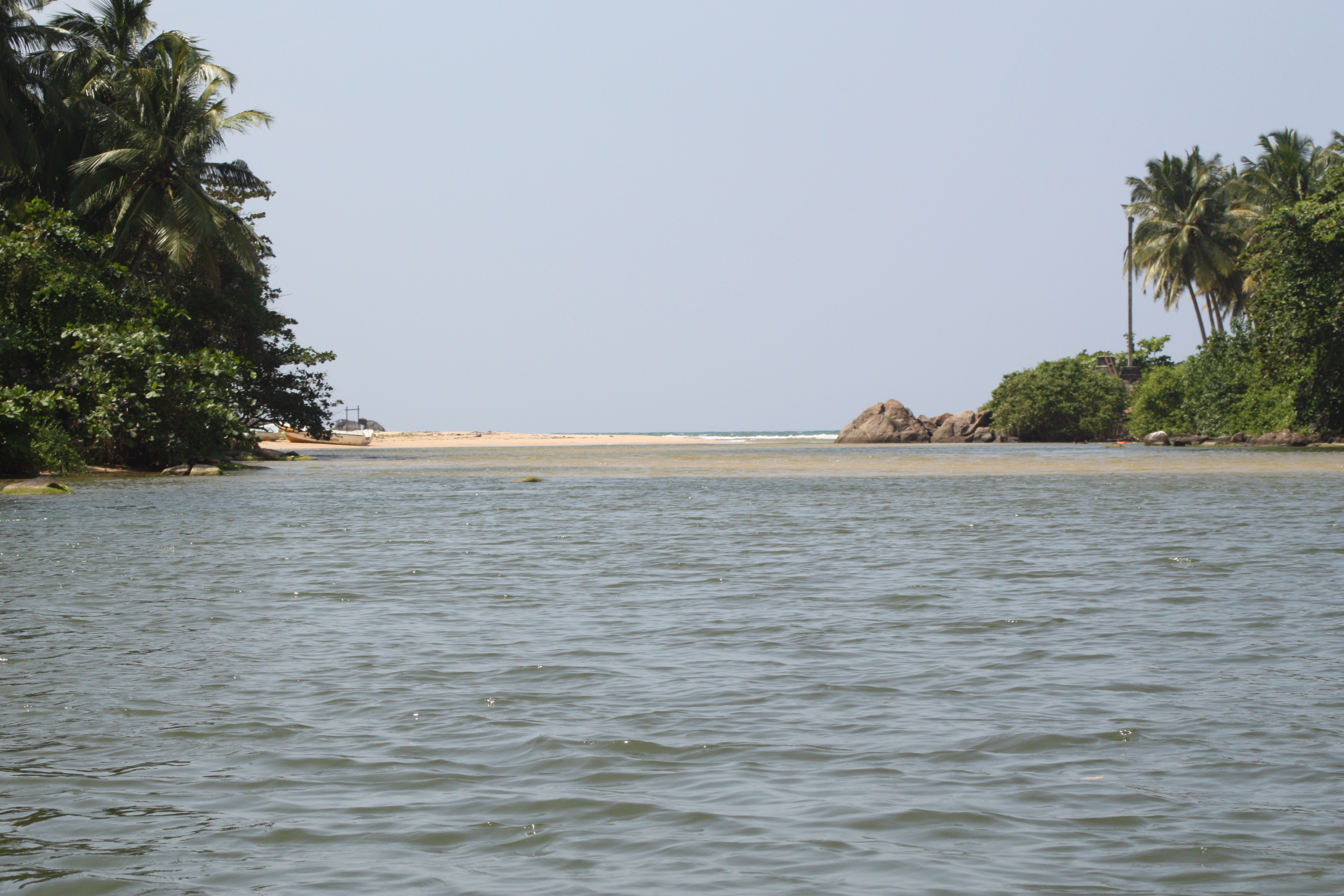
Mouth of Madu Ganga.

== See also ==
- List of rivers of Sri Lanka
