= Ananda Central College =

Ananda Central College-Elpitiya
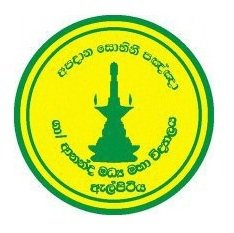

Location
- Elpitiya; Sri Lanka; 6°17′44″N 80°09′58″E

Information
- Type: National
- Motto: "අපදාන සොභිනී පඤ්ඤා"; Apadana Sobhini Paknkna
- Established: 1940s
- Founder: Anagarika Dharmapala and Colonel Henry Steel Olcott
- Principal: Roshan Pradeep Rahubaddha
- Grades: Class 1 - 13
- Gender: Co-ed
- Age range: 6 to 19
- Enrollment: 4000
- Colours: Green and yellow
- Affiliation: Buddhist
- Website: www.elpitiyaananda.lk

Ananda Central College-Elpitiya (Sinhala: ආනන්ද ම‍‍ධ්‍ය මහා විද්‍යාලය-ඇල්පිටිය), is a co-educational National school in the Elpitiya division, Galle district, Sri Lanka. It provides education for around 4000 students in grades 1 to 13.

== Location and size ==
Ananda Central College is situated on the left side of the road towards Pitigala 100 meters from the main city of Elpitiya in the Galle District. It consists of over 4500 students and a staff of about 130 teachers.

== History ==
Ananda Central College was founded in the 1940s. During the World War II after the Japanese dropped bombs on Colombo 5 April 1942. In case Anagarika Dharmapala and Colonel Henry Steel Olcott tried to establish schools across the country, and as a result they founded The Ananda Central College.

During World War II bombing, people left Colombo - Sri Lanka towards the cities/villages inside the country. As a result, branches of schools in Colombo was formed in inner cities/villages in order to provide education. Ananda College - Elpitiya was started as a result of that.

Initially, the school was started in a temporary small hut made with cadjan leaves (Pol Athu) at 11th Mile Post at Elpitiya Pitigala Road. It was started with few number of students and the first principal was M.W. Karunananda from Colombo Ananda College. The land for the school was provided by Gunasekara who was living in the area that time. Goluwamulle Rathnalankara, S. T. Molligoda, and Sebbakutti Arachchi were pioneers in starting the school. Initially the teachers from Colombo carried out teaching and it was managed by Colombo Parama Vignanartha Buddhist Society (පරම විඥානාර්ථ බෞද්ධ සමාගම). After Karunananda’ time as the first principal, E.W. Gunapala, D.C.L. Amarasinghe and O. K. D. Silva served as principals.

After World War II was over in 1945, people who came from Colombo went back again. At that time the principal, O. K. D. Silva, teachers and surrounding residents handed over the college to the Government. On 16 January 1945, the Education Minister Hon. C. W. W. Kannangara took over the school to the government. After that the college went on a huge transformation and development. That time the college was named as G/Elpitiya Government School. After that J. Amarasinghe, A. Thanthrigoda, D. Francis Silva, and M. K. Wijethilaka served as principals of the school. While the school was in 11th mile post, the school produced some prominent persons such as D.P. Athukorala and Rupa Karunathilake.

During Principal M. K. Wijethilaka's time, the school was moved to current location at Elpitiya on 30 March 1955. The new building was opened by Educational Director T.T. Jayasuria and Prime Minister John Kotelawala. During this time from Grade 6 to Senior High School level studies were carried out in the English language. During this time the school was changed to a Senior High School and the name of the school was changed to G/Ananda Central College (G represents Galle). During this time many courses added and new buildings, laboratories were built.

In 1958, GCE A/L Arts Section was started and in 1960, 05 students were elected to university education. This time the principal was Peter Rajapaksa.

In 1963, A. Thrimavithana was appointed as the principal and he changed the school time only for morning session (previously morning and evening sessions). He took over the provincial educational office land to the school. In 1965, W. Thambavita was appointed as the principal to school and this time GCE A/L Science and Arts Sections were established. The number of students in the school was increased up to 1,500. New laboratories, two story buildings, commerce lab were built at this time. During that time with 10 donors in the vicinity of school built the library, while the teachers and students prepared the ground for construction. During Thambavita's time the school achieved a significant progress of education and sports.

After Tambavita's time, in 1978 P. Jinadasa became the principal. During his time the school became a Central College. Rupa Karunathilaka Auditorium was built at this time. The playground was built by filing a huge marshy land. During this time also the school achieved many progress on educational achievements such as many students were selected to university studies on science and mathematics.

In 1981, Thamara Saman Deepika who was a student of the school won the all island badminton tournament and progressed up to national, and international level. In 1985, the school was selected to hold Mahapola 10th Anniversary which was a prominent event.

1986, G. A. Somadasa became the principal of the school. During this time the school became a nominated as a National School. After his time, in 1996, G. Jinadasa was appointed as the school principal on a temporary basis.

In 1997, B. H. Ariyadasa (a former student of the college) became the principal. He got a change in location of employment and Danasiri Silva joined as the principal.

Subsequent to those initial leader's leading the school, many other principals led the school.

In addition to the Ananda Central College – Elpitiya, adjacently a primary school was there which was named as Elpitiya Buddhist Mix School (BTS). During 1970, the principal of that school, J. Kariyawasam made this school as a trial primary school for Ananda Central College – Elpitiya, but was not legally connected. After Kariyawasam, K.C. Perera and D.S. Maginarachchi became principals of the primary school. In 1979 the primary school legally combined with Ananda Central College- Elpitiya, during P. Jinadasa's time. A milstone of the cadet platoon was marked with the utmost dedication of Late Major Anil Priyantha who died in Rantambe while participating in an exercise in Loggal Oya where he was attacked by a crocodile. He rendered an immence service to build up the cadet billet with the support of Mr. Meththaananda who later became the principal. Girls cadet platoon was given a new journey by mrs Manori, Deepika and Samadara which was later (2024)taken over by Major Sanjaya Gonsal Korala, BA, Ndip who was first joined the school in 2009 and called for active service in Sri Lanka Navy as an instructor . The girls platoon became the 1st in the District selection test and 3 rd in the province and got selected to compete for De Soysa Challenge Trophy for the first time in the History of the School.

Ananda Central College is a village of schools. It has been serving for many years and continue to serve the area, province and the country.

== Houses ==
The students are divided into 4 houses:

- Gamunu
- Parakum
- Thissa
- Vijaya
