= Imaduwa =

- Suburb
- Interactive map of Imaduwa
- Country: Sri Lanka
- Province: Southern Province
- District: Galle District
- Divisional Secretariat: Imaduwa Divisional Secretariat

Government
  - Divisional Secretary: G. G. Lakshmi Kanthi
- Time zone: UTC+5:30 (Sri Lanka Standard Time)

Imaduwa is a suburb of Galle. It is located approximately 21 km (13 mi) away from the Galle within Galle District of the Southern Province of Sri Lanka. It is situated on the boundary of Galle district and Matara District. It is a major centre which connects Matara District with Galle district. It is a major suburb on the A17 highway, after Galle. It is a major centre on the road for vehicles and long distance buses run on the route. It is also a four-way junction on the road. It connects Makumbura-Yakkalamulla-Imaduwa road and Dikkumbura (Ahangama)-Imaduwa road with the A17 highway which runs between Galle and Madampe.

Although it is mainly a working class and farming area, today it has become an important business centre for the villagers who live in the villages surrounding Imaduwa.

== History ==
Imaduwa was a village which belonged to the ancient Magama kingdom. The nearer Paragoda Raja Maha Vihara, which was built by a king, is evidence that this region was a significant region from the past, Anuradhapura reign.

== Local facilities ==
- Banks – National Savings Bank, Bank of Ceylon, People's Bank, Regional Development Bank
- Hospitals – Imaduwa District Hospital
- Schools – Bateymulla National School, Paragoda Gunarathana Junior School
- Imaduwa Police Post
- Kananke Police Station (Nearby)
- Imaduwa Post Office

== Public Transport ==
=== Expressways ===
The E01 Expressway (Southern Expressway) goes through A17 highway at Imaduwa. There is an interchange of Southern Expressway at Imaduwa. It is the main entrance and exit of the A17 highway, Akuressa, Habaraduwa, Ahangama villagers to the Southern Expressway. At present, no bus services operate from Imaduwa via the Southern Expressway.

=== Bus Routes ===
As Imaduwa is a major suburb on the A17 highway, several bus routes operate from Imaduwa and via Imaduwa through the A17 highway. It also has several bus routes which can be used to access to Galle and some of its other suburbs, including Yakkalamulla, Ahangama, and Dikkumbura. There are bus routes which connect Imaduwa with Matara and some other suburbs in the Matara District, like Weligama and Akuressa.

== See also ==
- Galle
- Yakkalamulla
- List of towns in Southern Province, Sri Lanka
