= Ahangama =

- Location within Sri Lanka
- Country: Sri Lanka
- Province: Southern Province
- District: Galle
- Time zone: UTC+5:30 (Sri Lanka Standard Time)
- Website: https://ahangama.com/

Ahangama is a coastal town in Galle District, Southern Province of Sri Lanka. It is approximately 18 km (11 mi) east of Galle. The A2 highway passes through the town.

== Geography ==
Nearby towns include Habaraduwa, Koggala, Weligama, and Imaduwa.

== History ==
Historically, Ahangama is situated within the Principality of Ruhuna.

Ahangama was significantly affected by the tsunami caused by the 2004 Indian Ocean earthquake, where the waters measured 9.3 metres (31 ft) high.

Approximately 4 kilometres (2.5 mi) west of Ahangama is the birthplace of noted Sri Lankan author Martin Wickramasinghe and there is a museum, the Martin Wickramasinghe Folk Art Museum, dedicated to his arts and popular traditions in the town.

Approximately 2 kilometres (1.2 mi) west of Ahangama is the Kataluva Purvarama Maha Viharaya temple, which was originally built in the 13th century and has some late 19th century additions. The temple is renowned for its Kandyan-style paintings in the main shrine, dating from the late 19th century. The paintings of musicians, dancers and European figures illustrates an interesting piece of social history. Some of the Jataka tales (episodes from the Buddha's series of 550 previous lives) are painted here, and purportedly are 200 years old. There are also some cameo-style paintings of Queen Victoria and the Queen Mother, done in gratitude of Queen Victoria's role in ensuring the free practice of Buddhism outlined in the Kandyan capitulation of Lanka in 1815.

Ahangama is also the home to the Giniwella Kathaluwa and the ancient Temples. The Kathaluwa Buddhist temple is known for its murals and for the preserved first printing press, brought by the Dutch to Sri Lanka.

== Tourism ==
Ahangama is a coastal town, and is known for its beaches and picturesque landscapes. Ahangama's beaches include the Kathaluwa beach, Kabalana beach, Ahangama beach, Goviyapana beach, and Midigama beach. It is accessible via Galle, which is only 20 minutes from Ahangama.

Ahangama overlooks Weligama Bay, which is a significant surfing location.

== Special activities ==
The major activity in this area is tourism. There are many hotels and restaurants.

The area is home to traditional Sri Lankan stilt fishermen, who erect a single pole in the chest-deep water on the beach, just few meters off-shore, where they perch on a cross bar and, using bamboo fishing rods, cast their lines out beyond the surf break to catch small fish.

This area is also known for its coir industry.

Surfing is a popular tourist activity in the Ahangama area. Development is ongoing in parts, but for now it remains a relatively low-key region with a mix of surfer-friendly accommodation and the odd villa. The shoreline consists of slim sandy bays and rocky outcrops, though the A2 highway often runs very close to the shore.

== See also ==
- List of towns in Southern Province, Sri Lanka
- Ahangama railway station
