= Kothduwa Temple =

Temple in Sri Lanka

Kothduwa Raja Maha Vihara
- කොත්දූව රජ මහා විහාරය
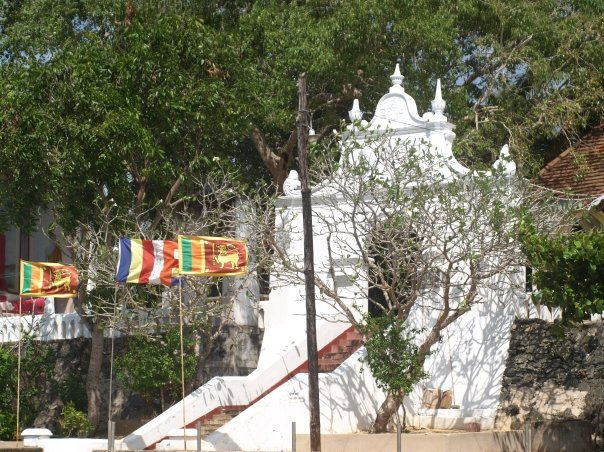

Religion
- Affiliation: Buddhism
- District: Galle
- Province: Southern Province

Location
- Location: Kothduwa, Madu Ganga
- Country: Sri Lanka
- Interactive map of Kothduwa Raja Maha Vihara
- Coordinates: 06°18′26.7″N 80°03′06.9″E

Architecture
- Type: Buddhist Temple
- Founder: Samson Rajapakse
- Completed: 1860s

The Kothduwa temple, or Koth Duwa Raja Maha Viharaya, is a Buddhist temple located on Kothduwa Island on the Madu Ganga in southern Sri Lanka. The island is located in Galle District of the Southern Province approximately 35 km (22 mi) north of Galle and 88 km (55 mi) south of Colombo.

The temple is believed to have once sheltered the sacred relic of the tooth of the Buddha, circa 340 CE. The Bodhi tree on the island was planted from a bud of the Jaya Sri Maha Bodhi by Deva Pathiraja, minister to King Parakramabahu IV.

== Location ==
The Kothduwa temple, or Koth Duwa Raja Maha Viharaya,is located at Kothduwa Island on the Maduganga river in Balapitiya, Sri Lanka.

The temple and the island on which it is located both lie within the Maduganga Estuary. Kothduwa is one of 15 islands within the estuary. The biodiversity of the wetlands surrounding the temple is exceptional and 111 species of birds and 248 species of vertebrates have been recorded in the area. In 2006, the Department of Wildlife Conservation declared 2,600 hectares of the estuary a wildlife sanctuary. In 2003, 915 hectares of the Maduganga Estuary was declared a wetland of international importance under the Ramsar Convention. The estuary and the 15 islands within, including Kothduwa became Ramsar Site 1372.

Access to the temple is by boat from Balapitiya, the nearest large town. The temple also operates its own boat for the purposes of running the temple, although it is sometimes used to pick up visitors. Those wishing to be collected by the temple boat should sound the horn and flash the headlights of their vehicle, from the access road on the mainland shore nearest the island.

== The temple today ==
As of 2006, Kothduwa temple was the residence of five priests, though several young novice monks also study at the temple and greet visitors. Ven. Omanthai Pugngnasara (also known as Ven. Omaththe Punnyasara) is the fourth incumbent of the temple, and has lived there for over 30 years.

The temple at Kothduwa is currently a popular destination with tourists. The resort town and beach of Balapitiya, at the mouth of the Maduganga, is home to several businesses that run tour boats. In peak tourist season, several tour boats a day ferry visitors to island restaurants, through mangrove tunnels, and stop-overs at the temple.

Foreign tourists are not the only visitors to the temple, which is swarmed by up to 1,000 local devotees on poya, a Buddhist holiday in Sri Lanka.

== History ==
In the 4th century CE, King Guhasiva of Kalinga was in possession of a sacred relic, a tooth of Buddha. The cause of political upheaval for hundreds of years, the tooth was believed to impart a divine right to rule, to whoever possessed it. The King, fearing that the object of his Buddhist worship would be forcibly taken from him, secretly sent the tooth away with the Princess Hemamali and her husband, Prince Danthakumara. Disguised as Brahmins and hiding the tooth in Princess Hemamali's hair, legend states that they sailed to Sri Lanka. Accounts of where they landed in Sri Lanka vary, with some recording their port as Trincomalee and others as Welitota, or present-day Balapitiya.

The legend that they landed in Balapitiya, at the mouth of the Maduganga estuary, is recorded in Pali Dalada Vansaya, or Chronicle of the Tooth Relic. The story continues that the couple hid the tooth in a sand shelter at Kothduwa, while tarrying there, before finally giving it to King Sirimeghavanna, the ruler of Sri Lanka at the time.

Many centuries later, after Kothduwa had become separated from the mainland and overgrown with vegetation, it was re-discovered by Deva Pathiraja, a minister to King Parakramabahu IV, who reigned in the 14th century. The Minister planted there on the island one of the 32 sacred buds of Jaya Sri Maha Bodhi.

During the tumultuous 16th century, when the Sitawaka and Kotte kingdoms vied for power and the Portuguese threatened the shores of Sri Lanka, it is said that the hot-headed prince Veediya Bandara was keeper of the tooth relic, and that he returned it for safekeeping to Kothduwa, where it remained for a short period of time.

Again, the island and the Dethis Maha Bodhi planted there passed into neglect, until businessman Samson Rajapakse took an interest in the area in the 1860s. He had the present temple built around the Bodhi tree. A portrait of Rajapakse now hangs in the main hall of the temple complex.
