= Wakwella Bridge =

- Coordinates: 6.106067°N 80.190539°E (?)
- Carries: vehicles, pedestrians
- Crosses: Gin River
- Locale: Galle District near Wakwella

Characteristics
- Material: Metal (steel)
- Total length: approximately 152.5 metres (500 ft)

History
- Opened: 1999

Location
- Interactive map of Wakwella Bridge

Wakwella Bridge is a bridge in Galle District near Thelikada, Sri Lanka. It is around 152.5 m (500 ft) long and crosses the Gin River. Built on the Gin Ganga Dam, the bridge links the villages of Kudagoda and Gonapura. It was constructed in 1999 and at the time was the longest bridge in the country.

== See also ==
- List of bridges in Sri Lanka

The current bridge has their piers between every 15 feet and with 5 feet of piers. Which made of steel. But due to the population growth of near areas increase up the passengers accessing of the bridge, then the current bridge is not enough for the demand at the moment.
