= Gintota =

- Location within Sri Lanka
- Country: Sri Lanka
- Province: Southern Province
- District: Galle

Population
  - Total: 2,738
- Postal code: 80280

Gintota is a suburb town situated in Galle District, in the southern part of Sri Lanka.

It is located 124 kilometres (77 mi) south of Colombo and 6.5 kilometres (4 mi) north-west of Galle and is situated on the left bank of the Gin Ganga, at the river's mouth.

The traditional industry in the area was coconut cultivation and the manufacture of coir rope from the fibre of the coconut husk.

On 22 November 1941 the government established a plywood factory at Gintota, to manufacture plywood tea chests and other plywood products, as their supply was restricted during the war. In 1957 the factory was made a corporation, under the State Industrial Corporations Act. In 1994 it was privatised.

The village is serviced by the Ginthota railway station, which is on the Coast railway line, running between Colombo and Beliatta.
