= Rakwana =

Rakwana රක්වාන இறக்குவானை
- Location within Sri Lanka
- Coordinates: 6°28′18″N 80°36′42″E
- Country: Sri Lanka
- Province: Sabaragamuwa Province
- District: Ratnapura District

Population
  - Total: 76,469
- Time zone: UTC+5:30 (Sri Lanka Standard Time Zone)
  - Summer (DST): UTC+6 (Summer time)
- Post code: 70300

Rakwana is a town in the Ratnapura District, Sabaragamuwa Province of Sri Lanka, a notable centre of Ceylon tea plantations and industry. Additionally, Rakwana is rich in gems and is a leading exporter in sapphires. Rakwana is locally administered by Godakawela Pradeshiya Sabha. The town of Rakwana including its northern and southern part and Kottala has 10,513 in population according to the census carried out in 2010.

Located at an elevation of 464 m (1,522 ft), north of Sinharaja Mountains, on the A17 highway. It is 12 km (7.5 mi) from Rakwana-Deniyaya on the way to Galle. It also has roads leading to Embilipitiya and Kalawana. Rakwana acts as one of the gateways for the famous Sinharaja Forest reserve.

== Demographics ==
Rakwana is a town in Godakawela DS Division in Ratnapura district.

Ethnicity	Population	% Of Total
Sinhalese	59,279	77.52
Tamils	14,423	18.86
Muslims	2,483	3.25
Other (including Burgher, Malay)	284	0.37
Total	76,469	100

Religious composition in Godakawela DS Division(Which include Rakwana Town area) Buddhists 59,074-77.25%, Hindus 12,287-16.07%, Islam 2,937-3.84%, Roman Catholics 1,341-1.75%, Other Christians 815-1.07%, Others 15-0.02%.

== Schools, Hospitals, and Police Stations ==
- R/Emb/Rathnaloka Central College
- R/Emb/St.Anthony’s National College
- R/Emb/St.John’s Tamil National College
- R/Emb/Assalam Muslim Maha Vidayalaya (National School)
- R/Emb/Madampe Wijayamaha Vidyalaya
- R/Emb/Madampe(No02) Tamil Maha Vidyalaya
- R/Emb/Madampe(No01) Tamil Vidyalaya
- R/Emb/Weralugamula Maha Vidyalaya
- R/Emb/Springwood Tamil Maha Vidyalaya
- R/Emb/Aigburth Tamil Maha Vidyalaya-Aigburth, Suriyakanda, Rakwana
- R/Emb/Demuwatha Maha Vidyalaya
- R/Emb/Panawala Maha Vidyalaya -Atakalapanna, Madampe, Rakwana
- R/Niv/Rambukka Maha Vidyalaya- Rambukka, Pothupitiya, Rakwana
- R/Niv/Dipdeen Tami Vidyalaya-Dipdeen, Rajawatha, Rakwana
- R/Emb/Horamulawatha Vidyalaya
- R/Niv/Pannila Maha Vidyalaya-Pannila, Rakwana
- R/Emb/Palamkotta Tami Vidyalaya(Primary School)-Navinna, Palamkotta, Rakwana
- R/Emb/Gangoda Tami Vidyalaya(Primary School)

Police Station’s

- Police Station - Rakwana
- Sub Police Station - Suriyakanda
- Sub Police Station - Pothupitiya

Hospitals

- Base Hospital - Rakwana
- Ayurveda Hospital- Rakwana
- Divisional Hospital - Madampe
- Divisional Hospital - Suriyakanda
- Divisional Hospital - Pothupitiya
- Divisional Hospital - Palamkotta

== Gallery ==
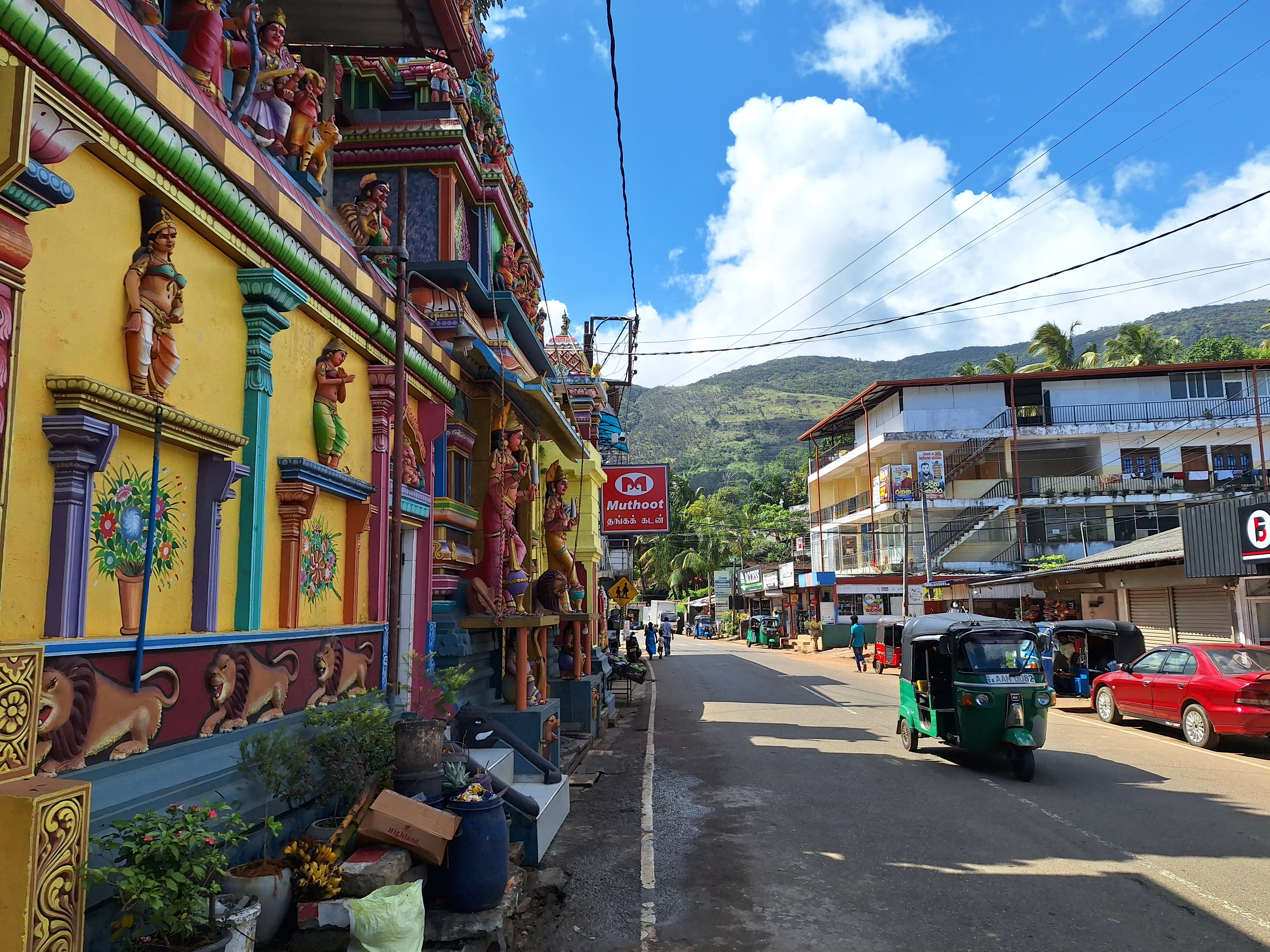
Rakwana, Sri Lanka Rakwana-Bulutota Rd (2024)
