= Batapola =

Sri Lankan village

Coordinates: 6°13′N 80°07′E

Batapola is a village located in the Galle District of Sri Lanka. Batapola is 8 km away from the town of Ambalangoda. Batayan ("Soldiers") lived there, which is where the name derives from.
