= Upananda College =

- Walahanduwa, Galle; Sri Lanka

Information
- Type: National School
- Motto: "අත්ත දීපා විහරථ“ Atta Deepa Viharatha
- Established: 1910
- Founder: Ven. Bataduwe Rathanajothi Tero
- Principal: D. K. Ariyarathne
- Grades: Grade 1-13
- Gender: Mixed
- Age range: 6 to 19
- Enrollment: 3,500
- Colors: Dark brown and yellow
- Affiliation: Buddhism
- Website: http://www.galleupananda.sch.lk/

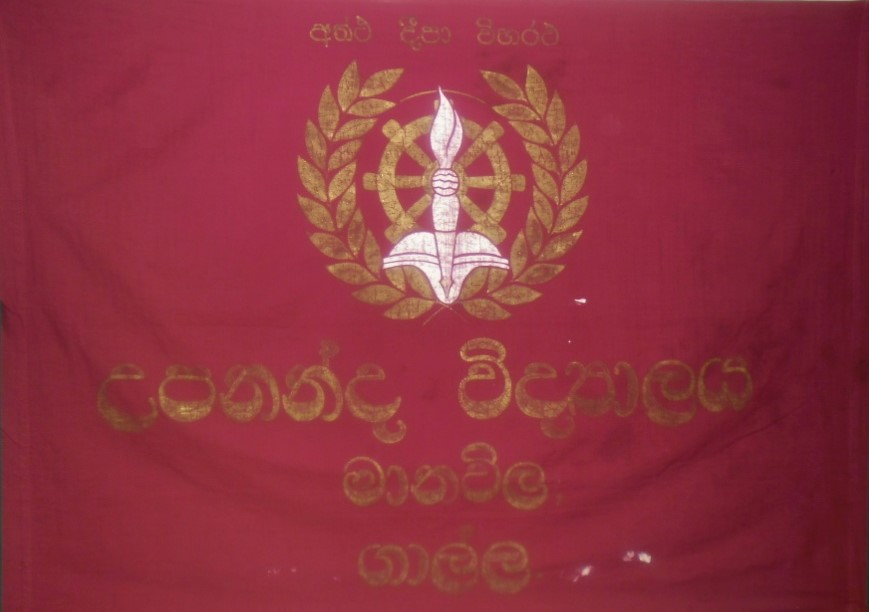
Upananda College Flag

Upananda College Galle, Walahanduwa is a government Buddhist school in Galle Southern Provence, Sri Lanka. The college was established by Bataduwe Rathanajothi Thero in Akmeemana, Galle on 16 January 1910. It comprises both a primary and secondary school.

== Inauguration ==
A Buddhist monk, Rev. Bataduwe Rathanajothi, with the help of the people in the area established a school, with about 10–25 students in a cadjan- hut, called Upananda which means the second happiness.

== Physical environment ==
Upananda vidyalaya is situated about 8 km (5.0 mi) (5 miles) away from Galle town on the Galle Udugama road. This area is under the zone of south-west monsoon rains and the rain forests. The economy of the people in this area is based on state farming and agriculture. Most of the area here are rural and towns like Pinnaduwa Walahanduwa are developing.

== Community structure ==
Though the people lead a rural life, the effect of urbanisation also can be seen most of the people in the area are farmers. About 97% of the people are Buddhists while 3% Tamils. There are about 98% of the people are Buddhists. As a result of situating between two temples the Kalugla Mawatha Mahavihara and the Keththaramay, almost all the students in the school are Buddhist.

== National Administrative Factor ==
It belongs to the Galle District in Southern Province. According to traditional administration deviation it belongs to Paththu and Galukoralya. Now it belongs to Akmeeman electorate and it governs by the Divisional Secretariat of Akmeemana, and Akmeeman Pradsheeya Sabha further it belong to Manavila Grama Seva Division.

== Development ==
Starting with 10-15 students in 1910 today it has been developed into a national school with about 2,300 students, with facilities for disabled students, laboratory facilities, computer facilities with internet and playground within a 4.9 ha (12 acres) site.

== History ==
During the 19th century there was a trend to build up Buddhist schools throughout the island. To encourage Buddhism in Galle District Bataduwe Rathanjothi started this school on 10 January 1910. The meaning of Upananda College became the idea of “second happiness” of the Bataduwe Rathanajothi.

The first building of the school was built up from the donation of well-wishers and the labour of the villagers. It was a building of 6.1 m (20 ft) long and attached with cajuns. Only 23 students were admitted to the school. The first teacher was A. D. Paranavithana and D. H. Gunasekara was appointed as the first principal.

The school was called many names in the past such as primary school and junior school. In 1949 it was called Upananda Vidyalaya. Upananda Vidyalaya had developed day by day under the supervision of various principals. On 1 August 1958 the school was promoted as Upananda Maha Vidyalaya then the government of gave aid to the school. In 1961 prime minister Sirimawo Bandaranayake visited the school to facilitate the science education of the school. On 18 August 1995 Upananda Maha Vidyalaya was promoted to a national school.

== Former principals ==
- D. H. Gunasekara (1910 - 1932)
- K. V. G. Silva (1932 - 1940)
- S. L. D. Wanigarathna (1940 - 1946)
- Sumadasa Thilakaratna (1946 - 1949)
- P. G. Daramasiri (1949 - 1958)
- D. Manawadu (1958 - 1693)
- D. L. Senevirathna (1963 - 1969)
- D. R. Wanigarathna (1969 - 1972)
- Noraman De Silva (1972 - 1988)
- Upali Jayasinghe (1988 - 1992)
- D. J. K. Siriwardena (1992 - 1995)
- A. D. A. Gunawardena (1995 - 2001)
- R. S. Jayasekara (2001 - 2004)
- S. M. Jayasekara (2004 - 2011)
- N. M. K. N. Weerasiri (2011–2016)
- D. Kariyawasam (2016–2019)
- Hemapala Andawaththa (2019-present)
