= Kosgoda =

- town
- Location within Sri Lanka
- Coordinates: 06°20′56″N 80°01′18″E
- Country: Sri Lanka
- Province: Southern Province
- District: Galle
- Elevation: 1 m (3.3 ft)

Population (2015)
  - Total: 3,664
- Time zone: UTC+5:30 (Sri Lanka Standard Time Zone)
  - Summer (DST): UTC+6 (Summer time)
- Postal code: 80570

Kosgoda is a small town in the Galle District, Southern Province, Sri Lanka. It is situated on the southwestern coast of Sri Lanka, approximately 50 km (31 mi) north of Galle and 76 km (47 mi) south of Colombo.

The town is known for its turtle nesting areas, where five (green, olive ridley, loggerhead, hawksbill and leatherback turtles) of the seven species of marine turtles' nest on the local beaches. In 1981 a turtle hatchery was established to protect the eggs of sea turtles that lay their eggs on the nearby beaches. The hatchery collects the eggs and incubates them in a controlled environment, before releasing the hatchlings back into the ocean once they are ready. The hatchery is run by the Wild Life and Nature Protection Society.

In addition to its turtle hatcheries, Kosgoda is also known for its beaches, Kosgoda River and traditional fishing industry. The town is home to a number of hotels, villas and small guesthouses.

The local economy is largely dependent on fishing, tourism, and the production of coconut and cinnamon based products. The town is home to several small-scale factories that produce coconut oil, coconut fibre, and other products made from coconut.

Kosgoda has a long history of Buddhist worship, and it is home to a number of ancient temples and religious sites. The most notable of these is the Kosgoda Raja Maha Viharaya, a Buddhist temple that dates back to the 16th century.

In recent years, Kosgoda has become a popular destination for eco-tourism. In addition to its turtle hatchery, the town also offers opportunities for bird watching, canoeing, and other outdoor activities. The nearby beaches and forests are home to a variety of wildlife.
