= R. G. Samaranayake =

Ceylonese planter and politician

Hon. R. G. Samaranayake

Member of the Parliament of Ceylon
- In office March 1960 – July 1960
- Preceded by: seat created
- Succeeded by: Albert Kariyawasam
- Constituency: Bentara-Elpitiya
- In office 1965–1966
- Preceded by: Albert Kariyawasam
- Succeeded by: Albert Kariyawasam

Member of the Parliament of Sri Lanka
- In office 1977–1989
- Constituency: Beruwala

Personal details
- Born: Richard Gregory Samaranayake; 12 November 1923
- Died: 18 June 1992 (aged 68)
- Party: United National Party
- Spouse: Irene née Jirasinghe
- Children: 2

Richard Gregory Samaranayake (12 November 1923 - 18 June 1992) was a Ceylonese planter and politician.

Richard Gregory Samaranayake was born on 12 November 1923, the eldest son of Hettiarachchige Don Saman Samaranayake of Mirigama. He was educated at Royal College, Colombo. He possesses a Diploma in Agriculture.

He contested the 4th parliamentary election, held on 19 March 1960, as the United National Party candidate in the newly created electorate of Bentara-Elpitiya. He defeated the Mahajana Eksath Peramuna candidate, Albert Kariyawasam, by 592 votes. At the subsequent 5th parliamentary election, held on 20 July 1960, Samaranayake lost to Kariyawasam, who now represented the Sri Lanka Freedom Party by 5,987 votes.

At the 6th parliamentary elections, held on 22 March 1965, Samaranayake received 22,085 votes (49% of the total vote) defeating the sitting member, Kariyawasam, by 5,987 votes. In November 1965 an Election Judge ruled the election result void, on the grounds that a sub-agent of Samaranayake, Soma Withanachchi, made false and misleading statements (allegations of bribery by Kariyawasam) at an election campaign meeting on 5 March 1965. A subsequent appeal by Samaranayake was dismissed on 1 August 1966 and the original decision was upheld. At the subsequent parliamentary by-election, held on 24 October 1966, his brother, Colin Wijesekera, ran in his place but was defeated by Kariyawasam by 1,677 votes.

Samaranayake married Irene Jirasinghe, the daughter of Reggie F. Jirasinghe and D. C. Wijesundere, they had two children.
