= Elpitiya =

Coordinates: 6.25°N 79.60°E

Elpitiya ඇල්පිටිය
- Location of Elpitiya in Southwest Sri Lanka
- Interactive map of Elpitiya
- Country: Sri Lanka
- Province: Southern Province
- District: Galle District

Elpitiya is a town in Galle District, Southern Province, Sri Lanka.

Elpitiya is easily accessible from the Southern Expressway (Sri Lanka). The city is located 3.8 km (2.4 mi) away from the Kurudugahahetekma Interchange. Elpitiya is also accessible from Colombo - Galle main road and is about 16 km (9.9 mi) from Ambalangoda. Also there are 3 other access roads from the Colombo - Galle main road at Bentota, Kosgoda and Ahungalla. Elpitiya is well known for its production of cinnamon and Low Grown Tea. Tea, rubber, cinnamon and rice are the main products in the area. There are more than a dozen tea factories and one rubber factory in the area.

The town is believed to be originated as a Plantation and since gradually expanded to its current state. Now it is one of the biggest towns in the district and still sees rapid expansion, mainly to the new Southern Highway. Elpitiya is one of the electorate with larger population in Galle District and also is the newly formed Police Division in addition to the Galle Police Division.

== Education ==
- Ananda Central College
- Ananda Primary College
- Nalanda Maha Vidyalaya
- St. Theresa College
- St. Mary's College
- Wallambagala KV
- Ratanasiri Royal College
- Thunduwa MMV
- Omatta Maha Vidyalaya
