= Yakkalamulla =

Yakkalamulla යක්කලමුල්ල
- Suburb
- Location within Sri Lanka
- Coordinates: 6°6′0″N 80°21′0″E
- Country: Sri Lanka
- Province: Southern Province
- District: Galle District
- Time zone: UTC+5:30 (Sri Lanka Standard Time)
- Postal code: 80150

Yakkalamulla is a suburb of Galle. It is located approximately 17 km (11 mi) from the city centre of Galle, adjacent to Makumbura to the west, Polpagoda (Imaduwa) to the south, Yakkalamulla-Akuressa road via Bangama on the east and Nabadawa to the north. It is a three-way junction (and nearby area) which connects the Yakkalamulla-Makumbura, Yakkalamulla-Imaduwa and Yakklamulla-Ketanwila (Akuressa) Roads.

It is originally a working-class and farming area.

== History ==
Yakkalamulla was ruled under the king of Magama. A nearby temple has a Sandakada Pahana (the semi-curved stone placed under steps of Buddhist temples) which belongs to Anuradhapura period, which has no carvings. The temple has one of the 32 Bo-trees sprung from the Jaya-Sri-Maha Bo Tree (Dethis Bo Ankura) planted there, during the Anuradhapura period.
