= Sirimal Ranawella =

Sri Lankan researcher

- සිරිමල් රණවැල්ල
- Born: 16 October 1921; Koggala, British Ceylon
- Died: 26 December 2020 (aged 99)
- Education: Unawatuna Buddhist Mixed School; University of Ceylon; University of London
- Occupations: Police constable, Archaeologist, Researcher, Vice Chancellor

Professor Gallage Sirimal Ranawella (16 October 1921 – 26 December 2020) was a Sri Lankan archaeologist and researcher, who made an important contribution to the study of ancient inscriptions.

== Early Ages ==
Born on 16 October 1921 in the beautiful village of Koggala in Galle District, he was raised by his aunt along with seven cousins. He received his primary and secondary education at Unawatuna Buddhist Mixed School (now known as Unawatuna Maha Vidyalaya). He later joined the Sri Lanka Police Service (SLS) as a police officer from 1944 to 1953, serving as a police constable. In 1949, he entered Harvard College, Bagatale Road, to study English. In 1950, he passed the Senior School Certificate Examination with flying colours. He passed the Higher Education Certificate Examination in 1952 and entered the University of Ceylon (Peradeniya) in 1953. He was then 32 years old. In 1957, he obtained an Honours degree in History.

During 1957 - 1958, he worked as a teacher at Dharmaraja College, Kandy. Later, during 1958-1959, he worked as an assistant editor of the Sinhala Encyclopedia. In 1959, the young Ranawella was appointed as an Assistant Lecturer in the History Department of the University of Kelaniya. He joined the University of London in 1964 and completed his Ph.D. in 1966 with a research thesis entitled A Political History of Ruhuna. In 1971, he was appointed as a Senior Lecturer and in 1977 as a Professor and served at the University of Kelaniya.

In 1978, he joined the University of Ruhuna and became its first Professor of History. He was the Dean of the Faculty of Humanities from 1979-1989. He was also the Acting Vice-Chancellor of the University of Ruhuna from 25 April 1988 to 27 December 1989.

== Authored books ==
- Sinhala Inscriptions Alphabet
- The inscriptions of Apa Kitagbo and Kings Sena I, Sena II and Udaya II (1999)
- Inscriptions of Ceylon, Vol. V, Pt. I Department of Archaeology, Sri Lanka (2001)
- History of the Rohana Kingdom (in Sinhala) University of Ruhuna (2003)
- Inscriptions of Ceylon, Vol. V, Pt. II Department of Archaeology, Sri Lanka (2004)
- Dictionary of Sinhala Epigraphical Words (in Sinhala) Department of Archaeology, Sri Lanka (2004)
- Inscriptions of Ceylon, Vol. V, Pt. III Department of Archaeology, Sri Lanka (2005)
- Sinhala Inscriptions in the Colombo National Museum Department of National Museums, Sri Lanka (2005)
- Inscriptions of Ceylon, Vol. VI Department of Archaeology, Sri Lanka (2006)
- Dictionary of Sinhala Inscription Words Department of Archaeology, Sri Lanka (2007)
- History of the Kingdom of Ruhuna (in English) Department of Archaeology, Sri Lanka (2018)
