= A17 road (Sri Lanka) =

Road in Sri Lanka

Coordinates: 6.470454°N 80.627031°E

The A17 road is an A-Grade trunk road in Sri Lanka. It connects Galle with Madampe via Deniyaya.

The A17 passes through Bogahagoda, Imaduwa, Kananke, Akuressa, Pitabeddara, Morawaka, Kotapola, Deniyaya, Suriyakanda and Rakwana to reach Madampe.
