= Gin Ganga =

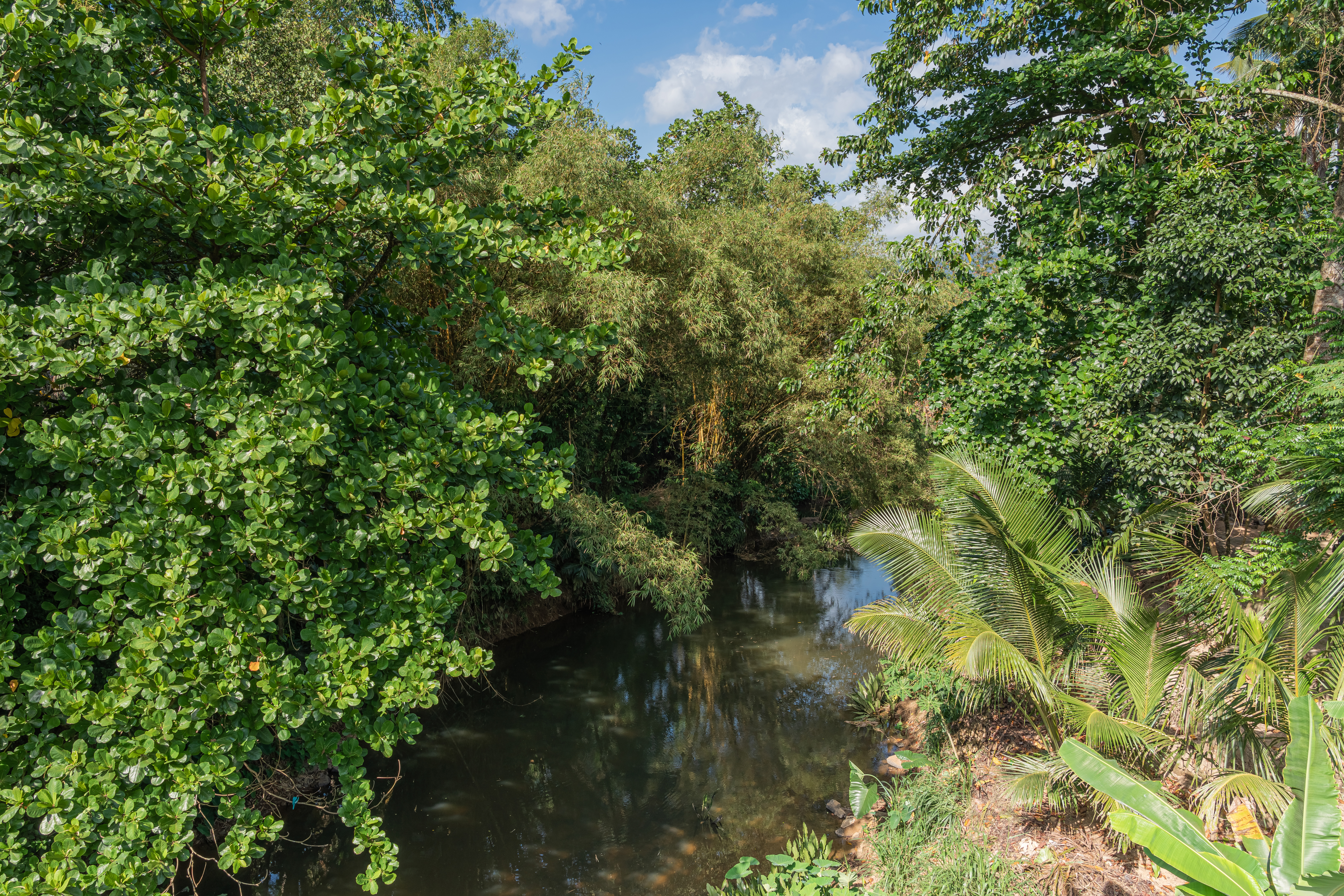
- Gin Ganga at Deniyaya

- Location within Sri Lanka
- Native name: ගිං ගඟ

Location
- Country: Sri Lanka

Physical characteristics
- Source: Sinharaja Forest Reserve
- Mouth: Indian Ocean
  - location: Gintota
  - coordinates: 06°03′47″N 80°10′27″E
- Length: 115.9 km (72.0 mi)

Basin features
- Tributaries
  - left: Nagare Ela, Divithura Ela
  - right: Holuwagoda Ela
- Bridges: Deniyaya Bridge; Mederipitya Bridge; Neluwa Bridge; Mapalagama Bridge; Gammadegoda Bridge; Waduwelivitya Bridge; Agaliya Mulkada Bridge; Unanvitya Bridge; Gin Ganga Bridge (E01); Kiribathawila Bridge; Halpotha Bridge; Dodangoda Bridge; Wakwella Bridge; Ginthota Railway Bridge; Gin Ganga Bridge (Bentota)

The Gin Ganga (Sinhala: ගිං ගඟ, Gin River), is a 115.9 km (72 mi) long river located in Galle District of Sri Lanka.

The river's headwaters are located in the Gongala Mountain range, near Deniyaya, bordering the Sinharaja Forest Reserve. The river flows past the villages of Baddegama, Nagoda, Thelikada and Hegoda. The Wakwella Bridge, which is the longest bridge in Sri Lanka, is built over this river. The river is also dammed at Thelikada. The mouth of the river is at Gintota, just north of Galle, where it flows into the Indian Ocean.

== See also ==
- List of rivers in Sri Lanka
- Wakwella Bridge
