= Albert Kariyawasam =

Sri Lankan politician (born 1921)

Hon. Albert Kariyawasam

Member of the Parliament of Sri Lanka
- In office July 1960 – 1965
- Preceded by: Richard Gregory Samaranayake
- Succeeded by: Richard Gregory Samaranayake
- Constituency: Bentara-Elpitiya
- In office 1966–1970
- Preceded by: Richard Gregory Samaranayake
- Succeeded by: Rupasena Karunatillake

Deputy Minister of Plantation Industries
- In office 1970–1977

Personal details
- Born: Haputhanthri Gamage Albert Kariyawasam; 8 May 1921
- Party: Sri Lanka Freedom Party
- Other political affiliations: Mahajana Eksath Peramuna
- Children: Sagara Kariyawasam

Albert Kariyawasam (born 8 May 1921) was a Sri Lankan politician.

Haputhantri Gamage Albert Kariyawasam was born on 8 May 1921. He received his primary school education at Christ Church School, Niyagama and the government school at Gammaddegoda before attending Henry Olcott College, Kolonnawa and Udugampola Government Senior School.

Kariyawasam contested the 4th parliamentary election, held on 19 March 1960, as the Mahajana Eksath Peramuna candidate in the newly created electorate of Bentara-Elpitiya. He narrowly lost to the United National Party candidate, Richard Gregory Samaranayake, by 592 votes. He changed his political allegiances and joined the Sri Lanka Freedom Party, running as the party's nominee at the subsequent 5th parliamentary election, held on 20 July 1960. He was successful, defeating Samaranayake by 5,987 votes, securing the seat of Bentara-Elpitiya.

At the 6th parliamentary elections, held on 22 March 1965, Kariyawasam ran as the sitting member. He received 21,084 votes (47% of the total vote) and was defeated by Samaranayake, by 5,987 votes. In November 1965 the election result was ruled void, and at the following a parliamentary by-election, held on 24 October 1966, he regained the seat, defeating the United National Party candidate, Colin Wijesekera Samaranayaka (Samaranayake's brother), by 1,677 votes. He retained the seat at the 7th parliamentary elections, held on 27 May 1970, defeating Rupasena Karunatillake, from the United National Party. Following the election he was appointed as the Deputy Minister of Plantation Industries in the Second Sirimavo Bandaranaike cabinet.

At the 8th parliamentary election, held on 21 July 1977, he failed to retain his seat losing to Karunatillake by 11,854 votes.

His son, Sagara, is a Member of Parliament, representing the Sri Lanka People's Freedom Alliance.
