= Uragasmanhandiya =

Town in Galle District, Southern Province, Sri Lanka

Coordinates: 6°21′N 80°06′E

Uragasmanhandiya is a town in Galle District, Southern Province, Sri Lanka.
