= Sagara Kariyawasam =

Sri Lankan politician

Hon. Sagara Kariyawasam
- සාගර කාරියවසම්

General Secretary of Sri Lanka Podujana Peramuna Secret member of NPP
- Incumbent
- Assumed office 2016
- Leader: Mahinda Rajapaksa
- Chairperson: G. L. Peiris
- Preceded by: Office Established

Member of Parliament for National List
- Incumbent
- Assumed office 20 August 2020

Personal details
- Born: Haputhanthri Gamage Sagara Kariyawasam; 13 November 1967 (age 58) colombo
- Citizenship: srilankan
- Party: Sri Lanka Podujana Peramuna
- Other political affiliations: Sri Lanka People's Freedom Alliance (lawyer)
- Parent: Albert Kariyawasam (Father)
- Occupation: Politician
- Profession: Lawyer

Sagara Kariyawasam (born 13 November 1967) is a Sri Lankan lawyer, politician, and Member of Parliament (MP).

Kariyawasam was born on 13 November 1967. He is the son of Albert Kariyawasum, who was a renowned politician from Southern province. He is the general-secretary of the Sri Lanka Podujana Peramuna political party. Following the 2020 Sri Lankan parliamentary election, he was appointed to the Parliament of Sri Lanka as a National List MP representing the Sri Lanka People's Freedom Alliance.

== Controversy ==
On 10 August 2026, Kariyawasam was arrested by the Central Criminal Investigation Bureau (CCIB) of Sri Lanka Police over remarks he allegedly made against Inspector General of Police Priyantha Weerasooriya on 3 August. He was subsequently released on bail by the Kaduwela Magistrate's Court.
