= Rupa Karunathilake =

Sri Lankan politician (1933–2011)

Hon. Rupa Karunathilake

Personal details
- Born: 15 March 1933 Galle, Sri Lanka
- Died: 11 October 2011 (aged 78) Colombo, Sri Lanka
- Party: United National Party
- Spouse: Hetumathie née Jayakody
- Children: Amal, Sangeeta, Sanjeev
- Education: Ananda Vidyalaya, Elpitiya; Mahinda College Galle; Nalanda College Colombo
- Occupation: Politics

Lokugamage Rupasena Karunathilake (15 March 1933 – 11 October 2011) (known as Rupa Karunathilake) was a cabinet minister and Member of Parliament representing Bentara-Elpitiya electorate, in Galle District. He was also a Sri Lanka Ambassador to the Netherlands. He was educated at Ananda Vidyalaya, Elpitiya, Mahinda College, Galle and Nalanda College Colombo. His youngest son Sanjeev is a Southern Provincial Council Member.

== See also ==
- Sri Lankan Non Career Diplomats
- List of political families in Sri Lanka
