= Thelikada =

- Village
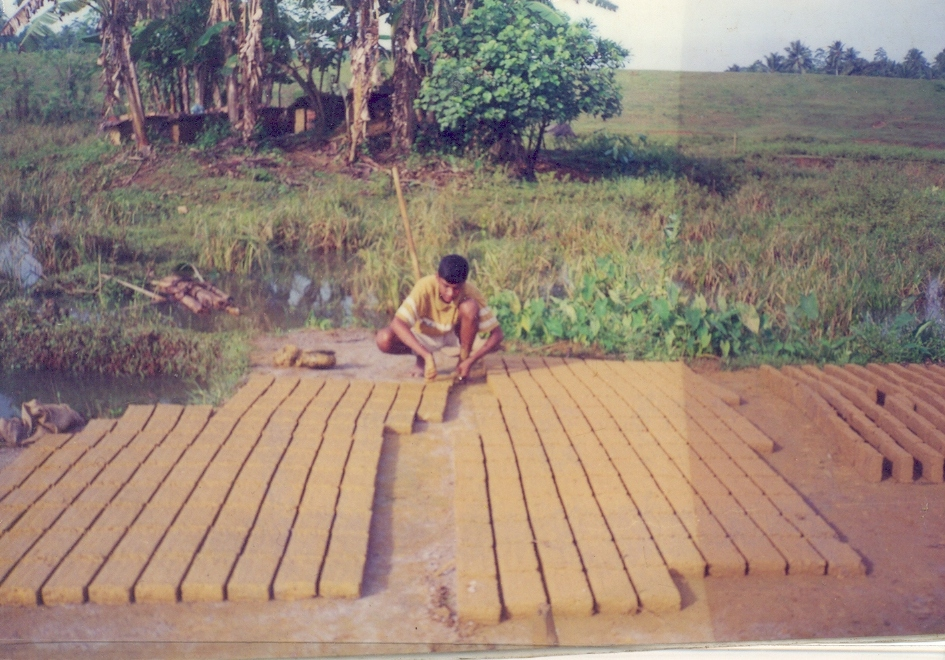
- Country: Sri Lanka
- Province: Southern Province

Thelikada is a rural village in Galle District, Sri Lanka, 116 km (72 mi) from the capital Colombo. The Gin River (Gin Ganga) flows near the village. The population of the village is around 2,000.

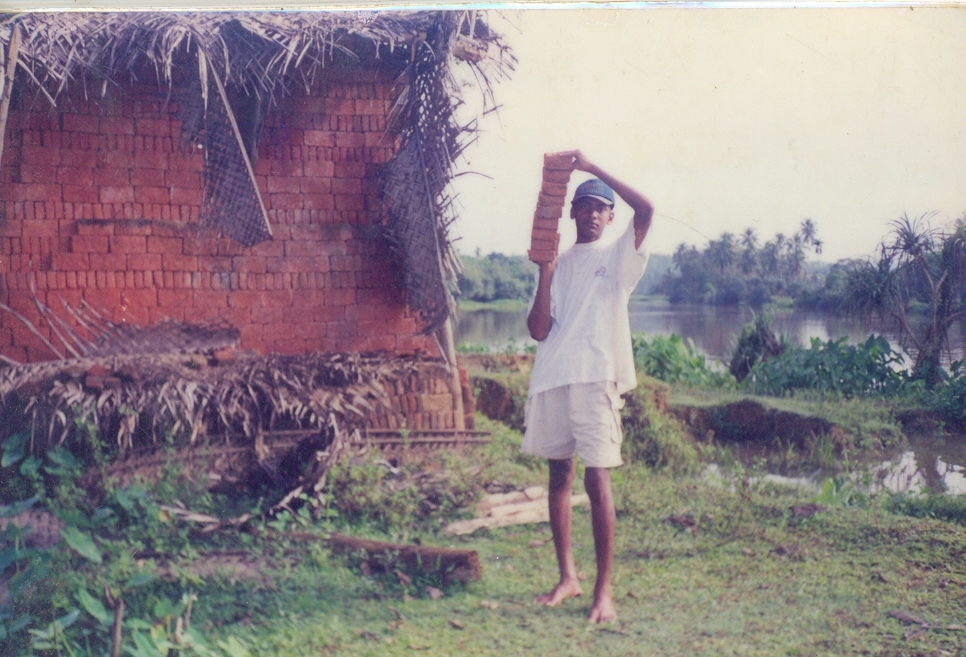
