= Galle =

City in the Southern Province, Sri Lanka

Galle ගාල්ල (Sinhala) காலி (Tamil)
- City
- City of Galle
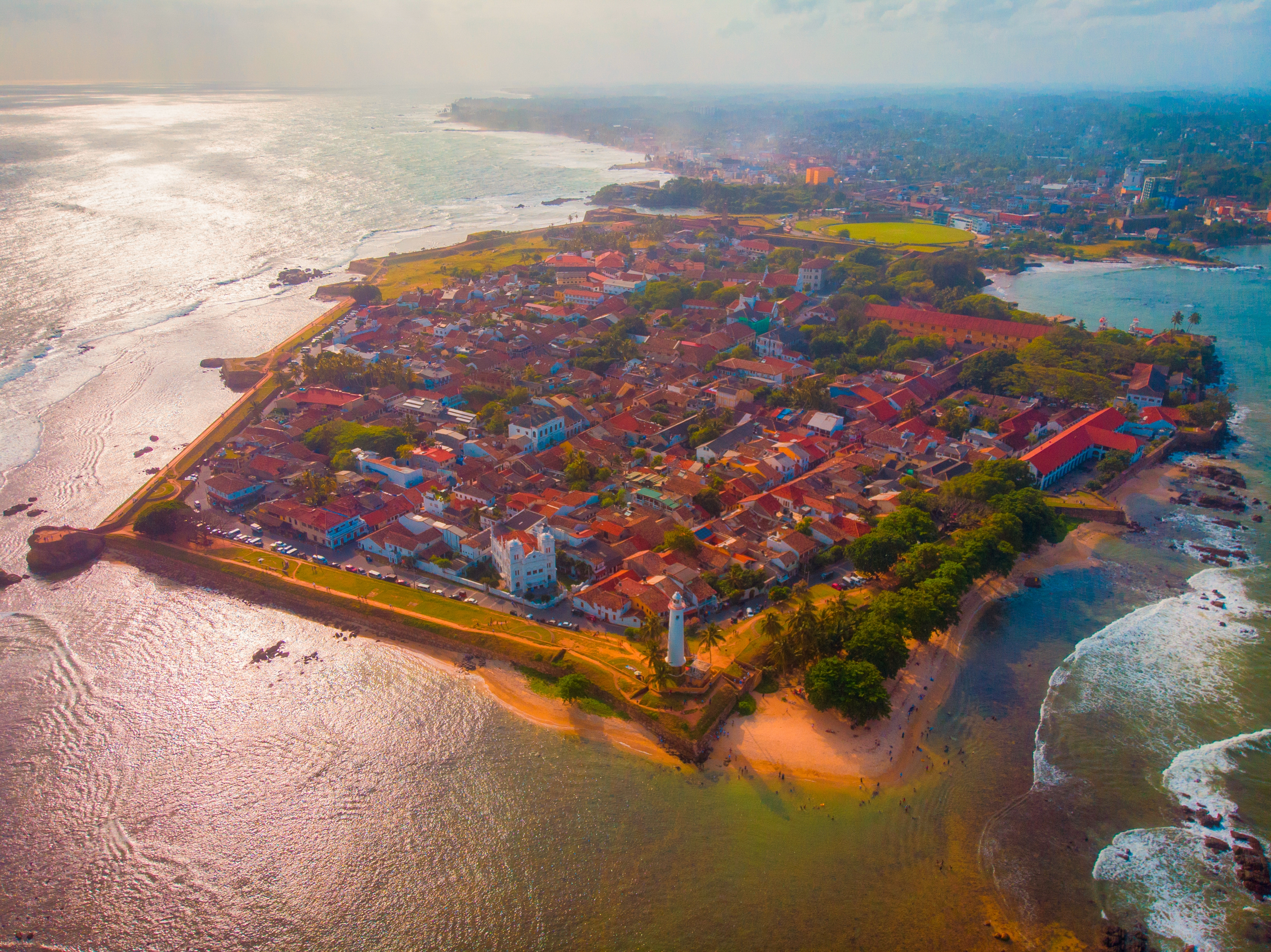
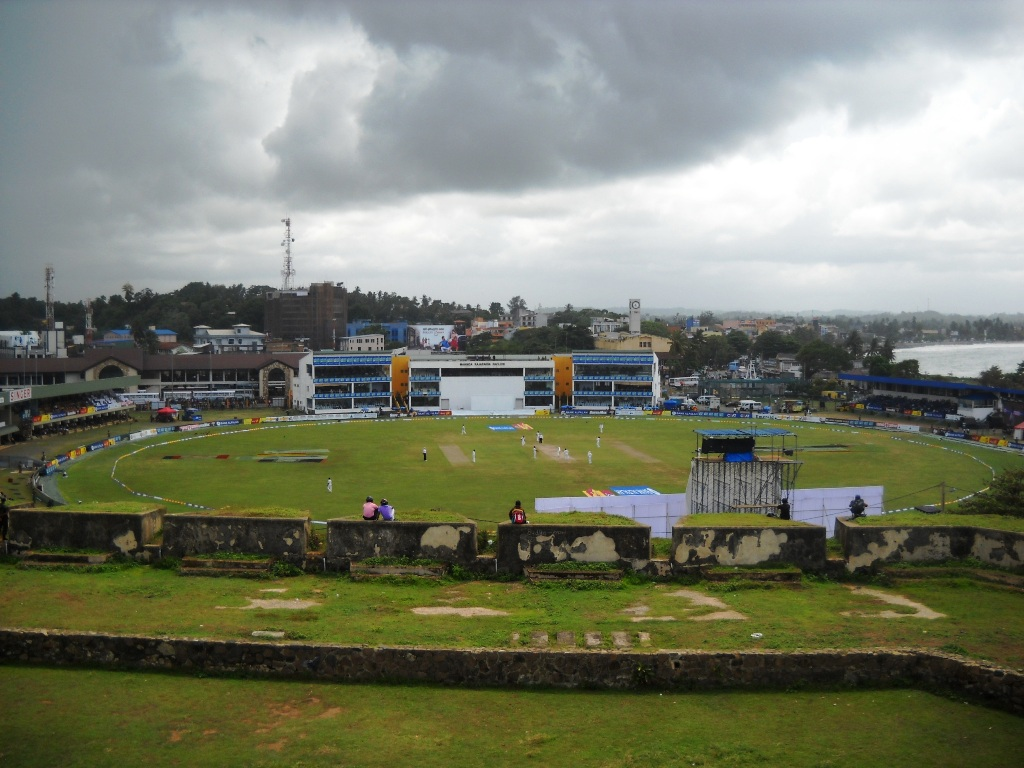
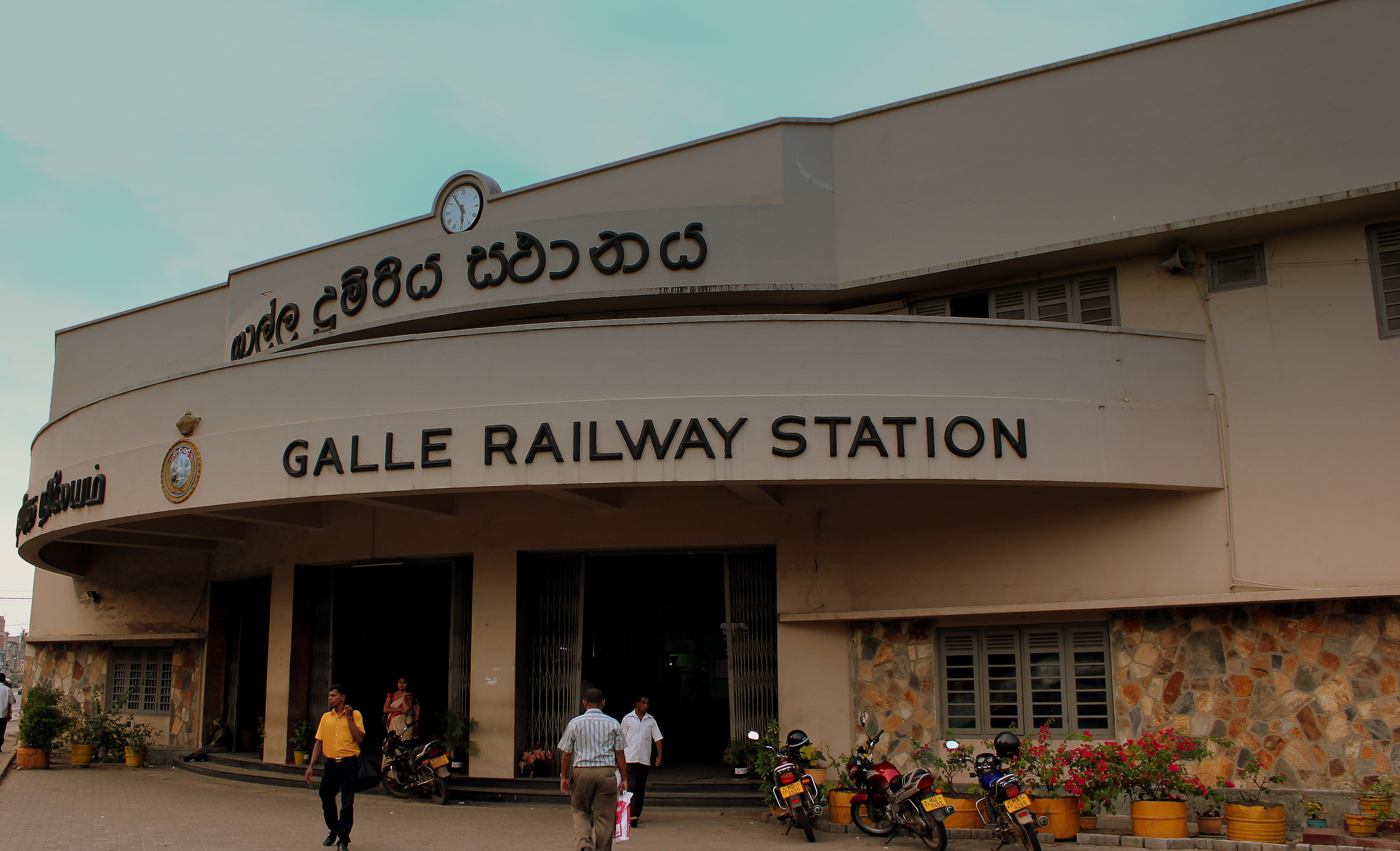
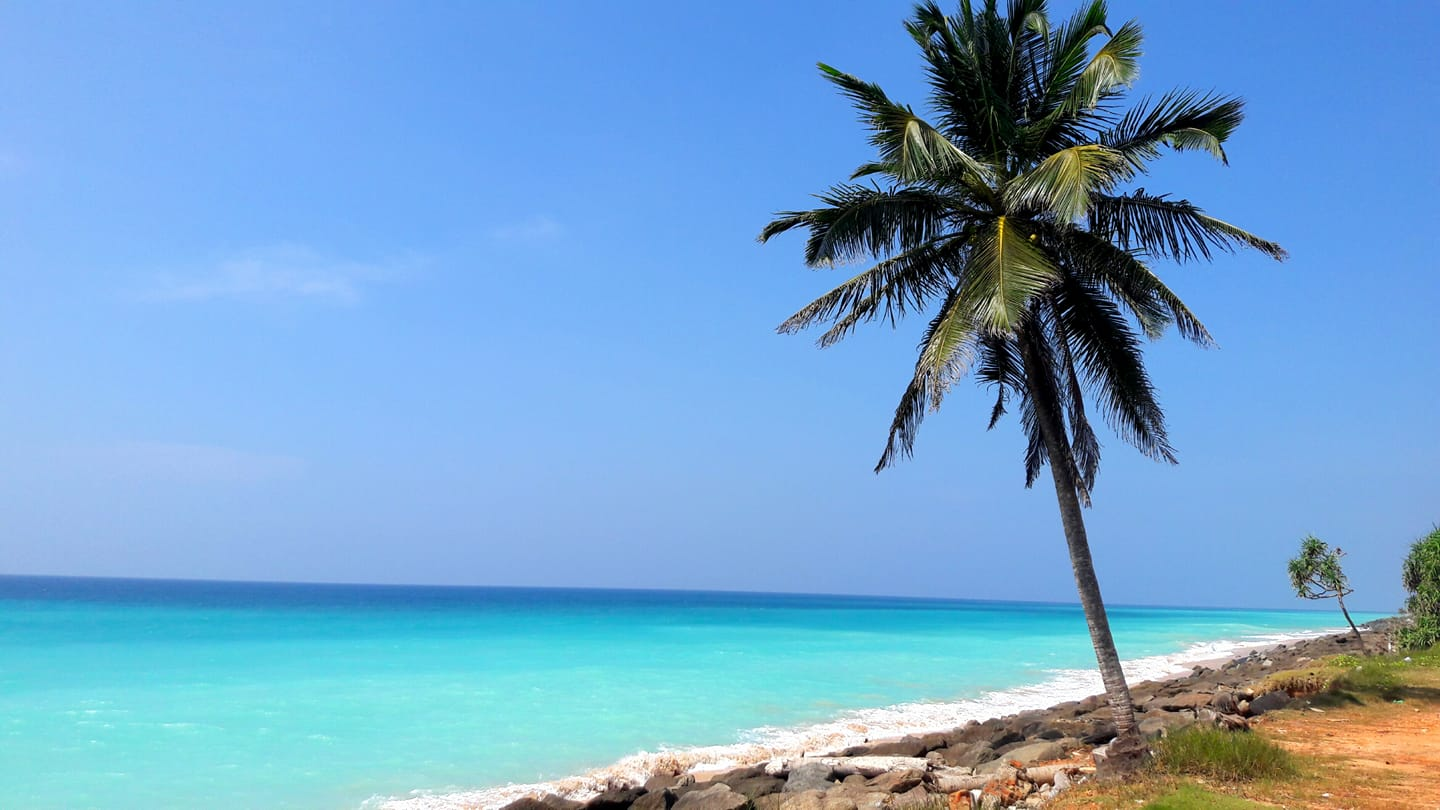
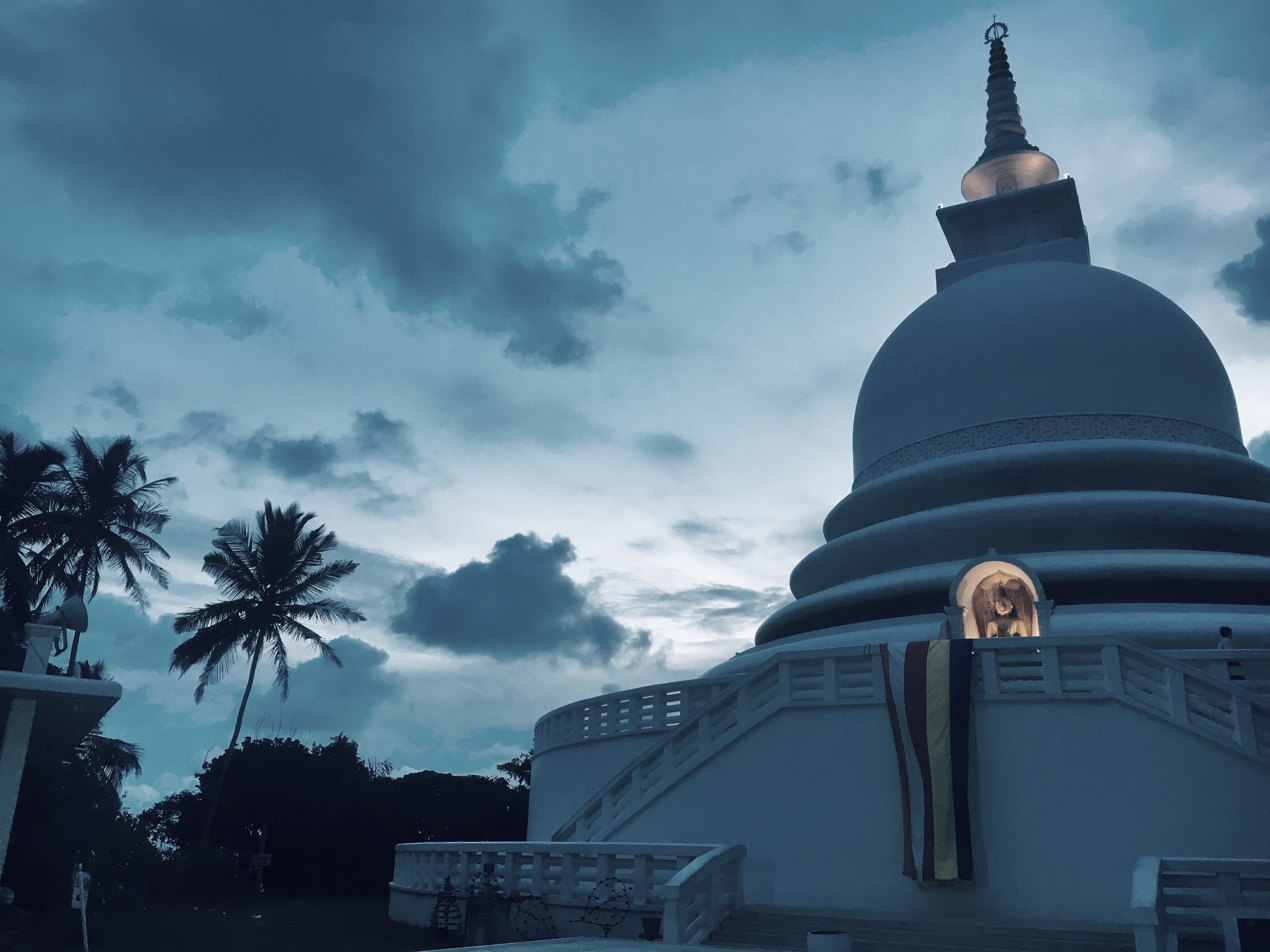
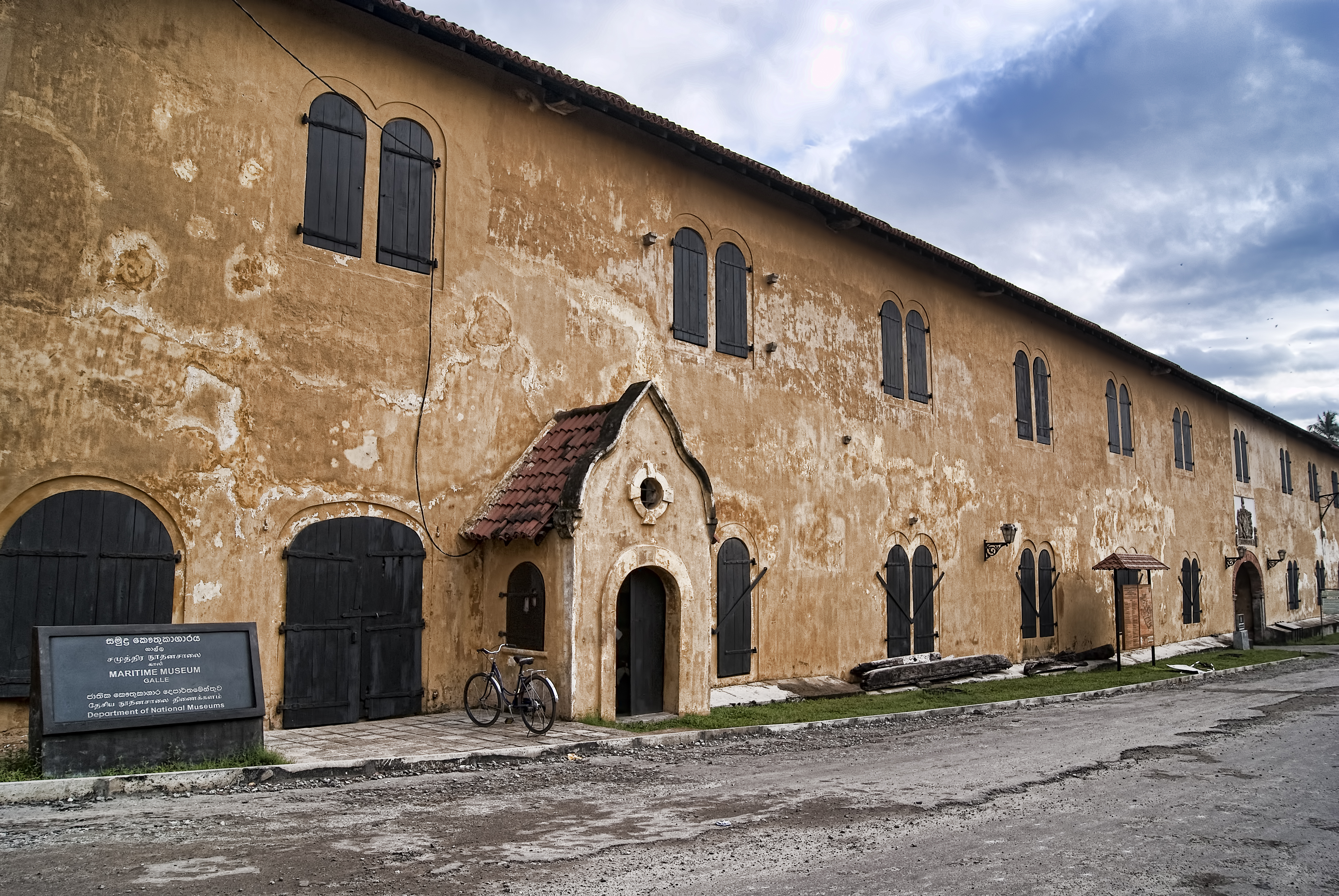
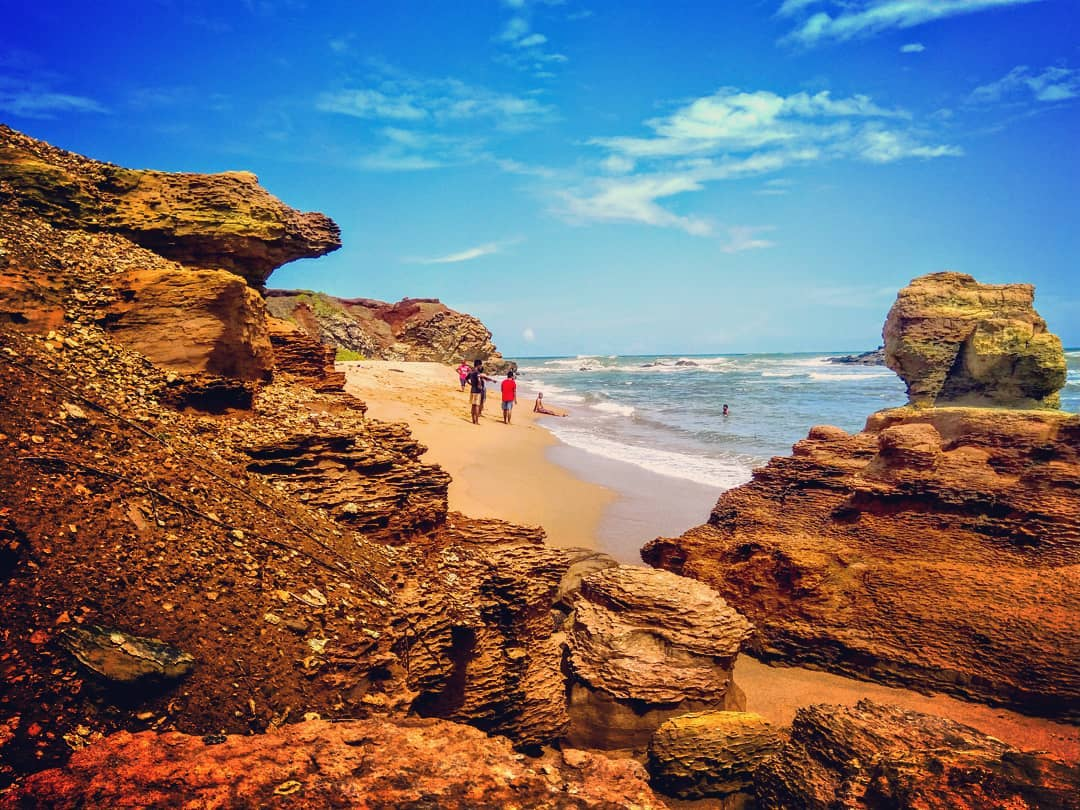
- Aerial view of Galle Fort Galle International Stadium Galle railway station Unawatuna beach Peace Pagoda in Galle Maritime Museum of Galle Rumassala

- Location within Sri Lanka
- Coordinates: 06°01′58″N 80°12′56″E
- Country: Sri Lanka
- Province: Southern Province

Government
  - Type: Galle Municipal Council
  - Mayor: Priyantha G. Sahabandu
  - Headquarters: Galle Town Hall

Area
  - Total: 16.52 km^{2} (6.38 sq mi)
- Elevation: 0 m (0 ft)

Population (2022)
  - Total: 112,252
  - Density: 5,712/km^{2} (14,790/sq mi)
- Demonym: Galleans
- Time zone: UTC+5:30 (Sri Lanka Standard Time Zone)
- Postal code: 80000
- Area code: 091
- Website: galle.mc.gov.lk

Old Town of Galle and its Fortifications
UNESCO World Heritage Site
- Interactive map of Old Town of Galle and its Fortifications
- Criteria: Cultural: iv
- Reference: 451
- Inscription: 1988 (12th Session)

Galle (Sinhala: ගාල්ල, romanized: Gālla; (Note: Sinhala pronunciation: [ɡaːlːə]) Tamil: காலி, romanized: Kāli (Note: Tamil pronunciation: [kaːli])) (Note: formerly French: Point de Galle) is a major city on the southwestern tip of Sri Lanka, 119 km (74 mi) south of Colombo. Galle is the provincial capital and largest city of Southern Province, Sri Lanka and is the capital of Galle District.

Galle was known as Gimhathiththa before the arrival of the Portuguese in the 16th century, when it was the main port on the island. Ibn Batuta, a Moroccan Berber Muslim traveller in the 14th century, referred to it as Qali. Galle reached the height of its development in the 18th century, during the Dutch colonial period. Galle is the best example of a fortified city built by the Portuguese in South and Southeast Asia, showing the interaction between Portuguese architectural styles and native traditions. The city was extensively fortified by the Dutch during the 17th century from 1649 onwards. The Galle fort is a World Heritage Site and is the largest remaining fortress in Asia built by European occupiers.

Other prominent landmarks in Galle include the city's natural harbour, the National Maritime Museum, St. Mary's Cathedral founded by Jesuit priests, one of the main Shiva temples on the island, and Amangalla, the historic luxury hotel. On 26 December 2004, the city was devastated by the massive tsunami caused by the 2004 Indian Ocean earthquake, which occurred off the coast of Indonesia a thousand miles away. Thousands were killed in the city alone. Galle is home to the Galle International Stadium, which is considered to be one of the most picturesque cricket grounds in the world. The ground, which was severely damaged by the tsunami, was rebuilt and test matches resumed there on 18 December 2007.

Important natural geographical features in Galle include Rumassala in Unawatuna, a large mound-like hill that forms the eastern protective barrier to Galle Harbour. Local tradition associates this hill with some events of Ramayana, one of the great Hindu epics. The major river in the area is the Gin Ganga, which begins from Gongala Kanda, passes villages such as Neluwa, Nagoda, Baddegama, Thelikada and Wakwella, and reaches the sea at Gintota. The river is bridged at Wakwella by the Wakwella Bridge.

== Etymology ==
Galle was known as Gimhathitha in ancient times. The term is believed to be derived from the classical Sinhalese term meaning "port near the River Gin". It is believed that the town got its name as Gaalla in the native tongue as a result of the large number of bullock carts that took shelter in the area, following the long slow journeys from remote areas of the island. Gaala in Sinhala means the place where cattle are herded together; hence the Sinhalese name for Galle, ගාල්ල, is a development from Gaala. Another theory is that the word Galle is derived from the Latin word gallus or the Portuguese word galo, which mean 'rooster' for the early colonialists used the rooster as the symbol of Galle.

== History ==
According to James Emerson Tennent (Colonial Secretary of Ceylon) Galle was the ancient seaport of Tarshish, from which King Solomon drew ivory, peacocks and other valuables. Cinnamon was exported from Sri Lanka as early as 1400 BC, and as the root of the word itself is Hebrew, Galle may have been a main entrepôt for the spice.

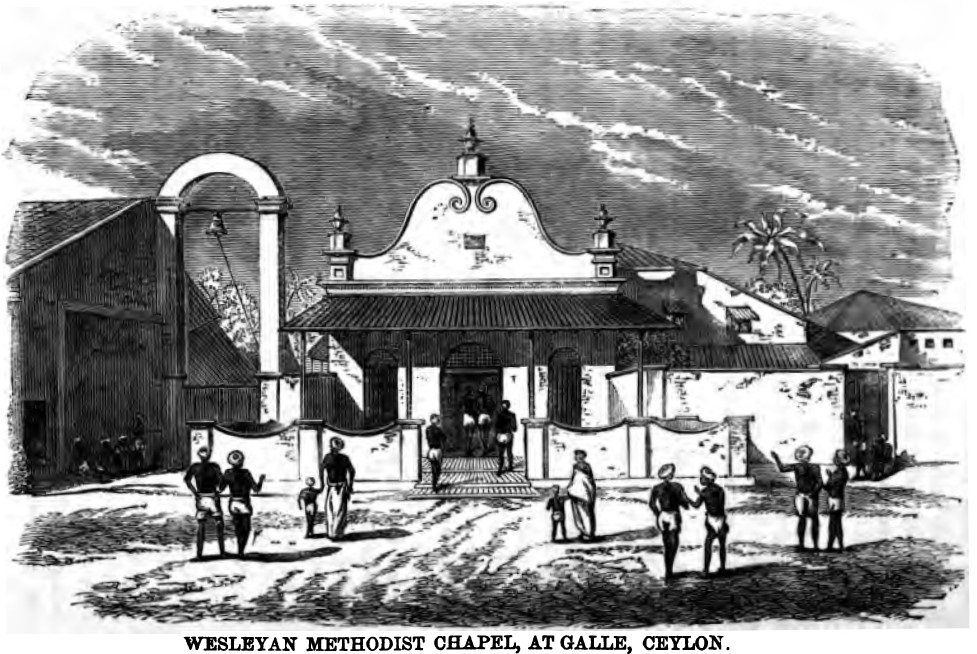
Wesleyan Methodist Chapel, 1868

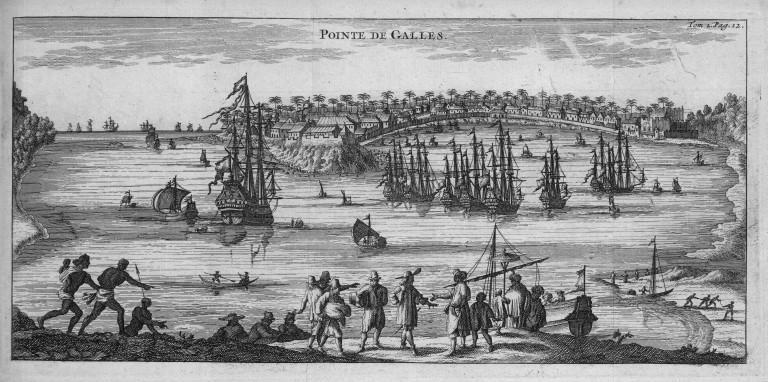
The port of Galle in 1754

Ancient Greek and Roman geographers may have known about Galle, which they might have called the Cape of Birds. Ptolemy might also have known about the port which he referred to as Odoka. Moroccan traveller Ibn Battuta visited Galle (or Qali as he called it) in 1342. During the 12th and 13th centuries, Sinhalese refugees fleeing Tamil armies from the north began to settle in Galle and other nearby areas.

Galle had been a prominent seaport long before western rule in the country: Persians, Arabs, Greeks, Romans, Malays, Indians, and Chinese were doing business through Galle's port. In 1411, the Galle Trilingual Inscription, a stone tablet inscription in three languages, Chinese, Tamil and Persian, was erected in Galle to commemorate the second visit to Ceylon by the Chinese admiral Zheng He. In 1502, a small fleet of Portuguese ships, under the command of Lourenço de Almeida on their way to the Maldives, were blown off course by a storm. Realising that the King resided in Kotte close to Colombo, Lourenço proceeded there after a brief stop in Galle.

In 1640, the Portuguese were forced to surrender to the Dutch East India Company. The Dutch built the present fort in 1663. They built a fortified solid granite wall and three bastions, known as "Sun", "Moon" and "Star".

After the British took over the country from the Dutch in 1796, they preserved the fort unchanged and used it as the administrative centre of the district.

== Climate ==
Galle features a tropical rainforest climate. The city has no true dry season, though it is noticeably drier in the months of January and February. As is commonplace with many cities with this type of climate, temperatures show little variation throughout the course of the year, with average temperatures hovering at around 27 °C (81 °F) throughout.

Climate data for Galle (1991–2020 normals)
| Month | Jan | Feb | Mar | Apr | May | Jun | Jul | Aug | Sep | Oct | Nov | Dec | Year |
|---|---|---|---|---|---|---|---|---|---|---|---|---|---|
| Record high °C (°F) | 34.9 (94.8) | 34.6 (94.3) | 36.4 (97.5) | 35.5 (95.9) | 35.3 (95.5) | 32.6 (90.7) | 31.5 (88.7) | 31.3 (88.3) | 31.2 (88.2) | 33.2 (91.8) | 33.8 (92.8) | 33.5 (92.3) | 36.4 (97.5) |
| Mean daily maximum °C (°F) | 29.9 (85.8) | 30.7 (87.3) | 31.6 (88.9) | 31.4 (88.5) | 30.4 (86.7) | 29.4 (84.9) | 29.0 (84.2) | 29.0 (84.2) | 29.2 (84.6) | 29.4 (84.9) | 29.9 (85.8) | 29.9 (85.8) | 30.0 (86.0) |
| Daily mean °C (°F) | 26.7 (80.1) | 27.2 (81.0) | 28.1 (82.6) | 28.4 (83.1) | 28.2 (82.8) | 27.5 (81.5) | 27.1 (80.8) | 27.2 (81.0) | 27.2 (81.0) | 27.1 (80.8) | 27.1 (80.8) | 26.8 (80.2) | 27.4 (81.3) |
| Mean daily minimum °C (°F) | 23.4 (74.1) | 23.7 (74.7) | 24.6 (76.3) | 25.3 (77.5) | 26.0 (78.8) | 25.7 (78.3) | 25.4 (77.7) | 25.4 (77.7) | 25.2 (77.4) | 24.8 (76.6) | 24.2 (75.6) | 23.7 (74.7) | 24.8 (76.6) |
| Record low °C (°F) | 18.7 (65.7) | 19.4 (66.9) | 17.1 (62.8) | 18.2 (64.8) | 17.1 (62.8) | 20.7 (69.3) | 20.9 (69.6) | 20.9 (69.6) | 20.4 (68.7) | 20.7 (69.3) | 18.1 (64.6) | 18.9 (66.0) | 17.1 (62.8) |
| Average precipitation mm (inches) | 86.8 (3.42) | 71.1 (2.80) | 89.9 (3.54) | 201.9 (7.95) | 315.9 (12.44) | 184.0 (7.24) | 172.6 (6.80) | 161.9 (6.37) | 260.9 (10.27) | 344.5 (13.56) | 282.6 (11.13) | 175.9 (6.93) | 2,348 (92.44) |
| Average precipitation days (≥ 1.0 mm) | 6.6 | 5.8 | 6.9 | 11.8 | 17.2 | 16.6 | 15.1 | 14.2 | 17.1 | 18.2 | 14.9 | 11.2 | 155.7 |
Source 1: NOAA
Source 2: Department of Meteorology (records up to 2007)

== Cityscape ==
=== Wards ===
Galle has twenty wards:

- Gintota
- Dadalla
- Bope
- Kumbalwella
- Madawalamulla
- Deddugoda
- Maitipe
- Dangedara
- Bataganvila
- Sangamiththapura
- Galwadugoda
- Kandew
- Galle Town
- Weliwaththa
- Thalapitiya
- Makuluwa
- Milidduwa
- Magalle
- Katugoda
- Imaduwa

== Governance ==
The Galle Municipal Council governs the City of Galle, established under the Municipalities Ordinance of 1865. It was at the time, only the third municipal council in the country. The first mayor of the city, Wijeyananda Dahanayake, was appointed in 1939; he later became the fifth Prime Minister of Ceylon.

The last appointed mayor was Methsiri De Silva, who served from 2009 to 2016. The mayoral system has been dissolved the Galle administration, with the city presently administered by a commissioner. The main vision of the city is "Building of moderate city through the supply of relatively increased utility services to the citizens who pay taxes to the Galle Municipal Council". The other vision is to brand Galle as "Green City-Green Galle" to create and promote Galle as one of Sri Lanka's cool and healthy coastal cities with a clean green canopy.

== Demographics ==
Galle is a sizeable city by Sri Lankan standards, and has a population of 101,749, the majority of whom are of Sinhalese ethnicity, with a large population of Sri Lankan Moor (Muslims), particularly in the fort area, who descend from Arab merchants that settled in the ancient port of Galle and married Sinhalese women. Galle is also notable for its foreign population, both residents and owners of holiday homes. Religious composition in Galle DS division according to 2024 census is as follows Buddhist-67502-62.31%, Islam-39021 -36.02%, Roman Catholic-774-0.71%, Hindu-661-0.61%, Other Christian-355-0.31%, Others-20-0.02%.

Ethnicity in Galle (2024)
| Population | Percent |
| Sinhalese | 63.02% |
| Muslims | 36.01% |
| Tamils | 0.91% |
| Others | 0.09% |

Government Statistics.lk

== Education ==
=== Schools ===
Galle is home to some of the oldest leading schools in Sri Lanka, with twenty-nine government schools and five international schools constituting the city's educational system. Some of the schools located in Galle city are listed below.

| School | Date of establishment |
|---|---|
| All Saints College | 1867 |
| Anula Devi Balika Vidyalaya | 1941 |
| British College Sri Lanka | 1900 |
| Buona Vista College | 1888 |
| Ceylinco Sussex College | 1997 |
| Galle International College | 2011 |
| Janadhipathi Balika Vidyalaya | 2007 |
| Kingston International School | 1900 |
| Leeds International School | 2007 |
| Mahinda College | 1892 |
| Malharus Sulhiya National College | 1918 |
| Muslim Ladies College | 2001 |
| Olcott Maha Vidyalaya Galle | 1937 |
| Richmond College | 1876 |
| Rippon Girls' College | 1817 |
| Sacred Heart Convent | 1896 |
| St. Aloysius' College | 1895 |
| Sanghamitta Girls College | 1919 |
| Siridhamma College | 1995 |
| Sudharma College | 1895 |
| Southlands College Galle | 1885 |
| Thomas Gall International School | 2006 |
| Upananda College | 1909 |
| Vidyaloka College | 1941 |

=== Universities ===
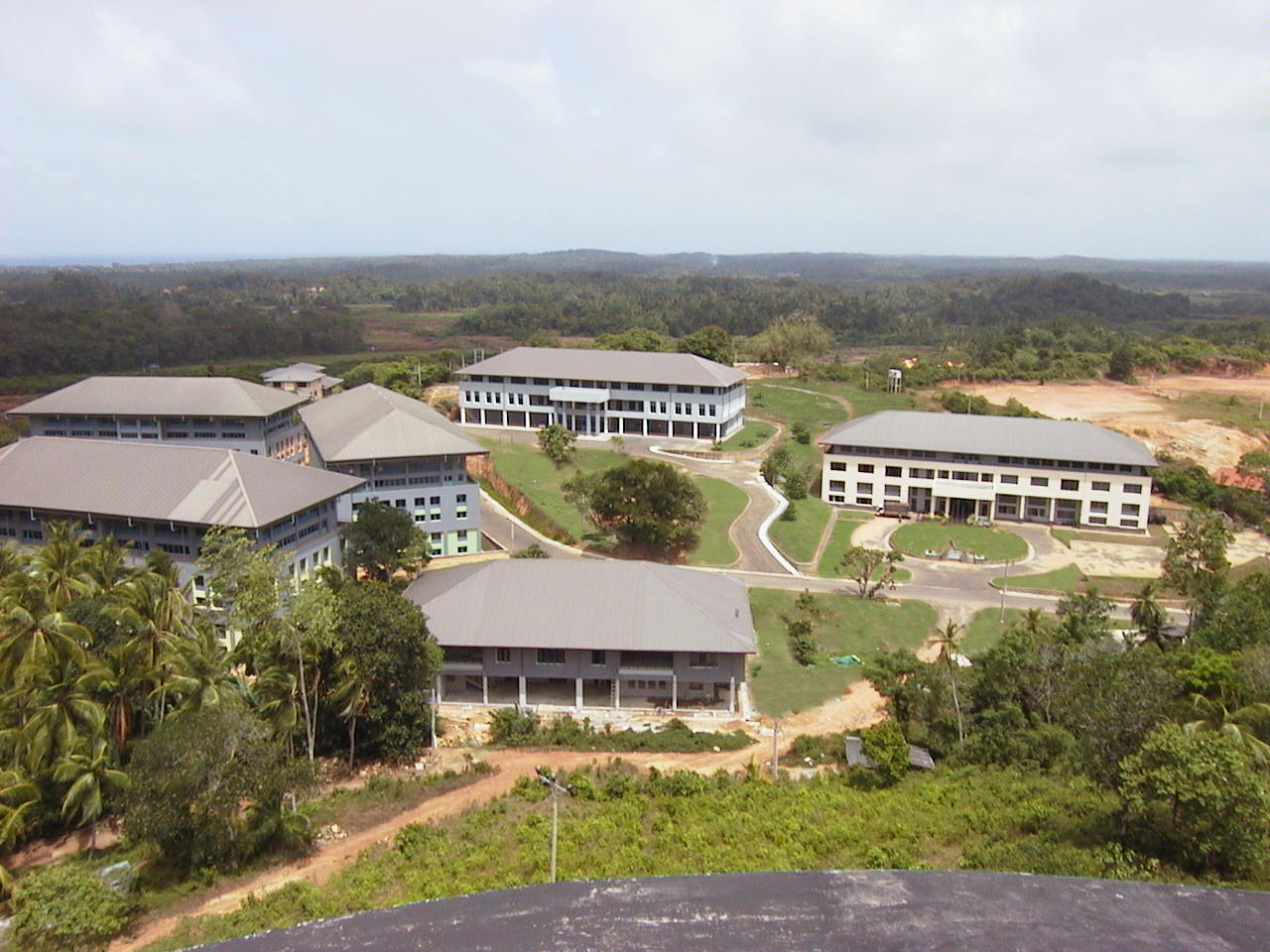
Faculty of Engineering, Galle

Three main faculties of the University of Ruhuna are located in Galle. The Faculty of Engineering is located at Hapugala, about 6 km from the city center. The Faculty of Medicine is located at Karapitiya near the Karapitiya Teaching Hospital. The Faculty of Allied Health Sciences of the University of Ruhuna is located in Uluwitike, in the city limits. A study centre of the Open University of Sri Lanka is also located in Galle, at Labuduwa junction.

- Faculty of Engineering, University of Ruhuna
- Faculty of Medicine, University of Ruhuna
- Faculty of Allied Health Sciences, University of Ruhuna
- Study Centre, Open University of Sri Lanka

=== Higher education institutes ===
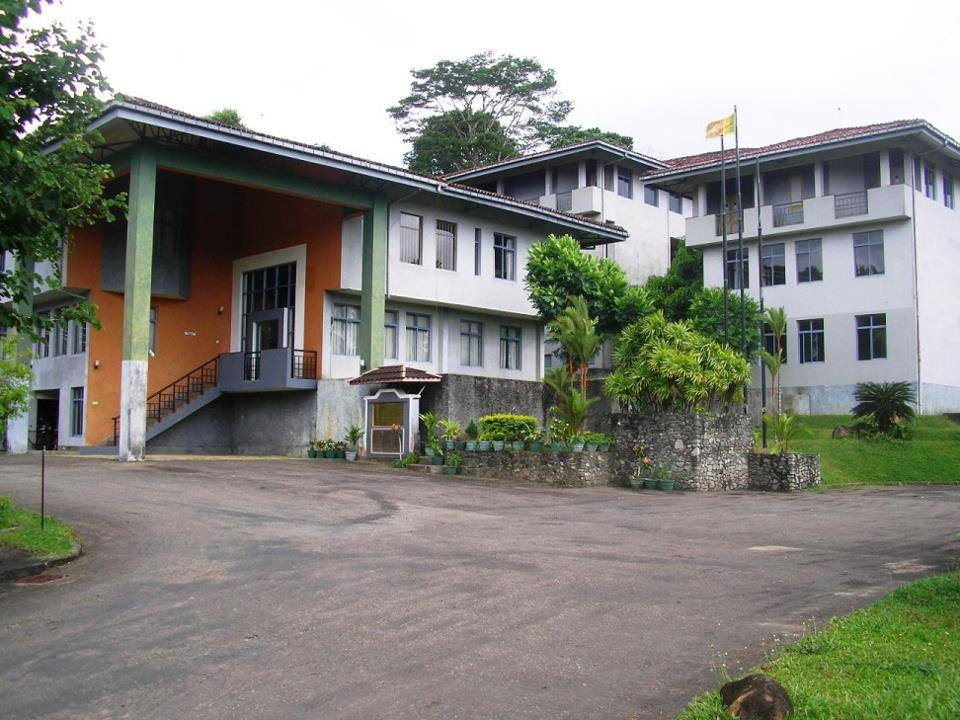
Advanced Technological Institute, Labuduwa

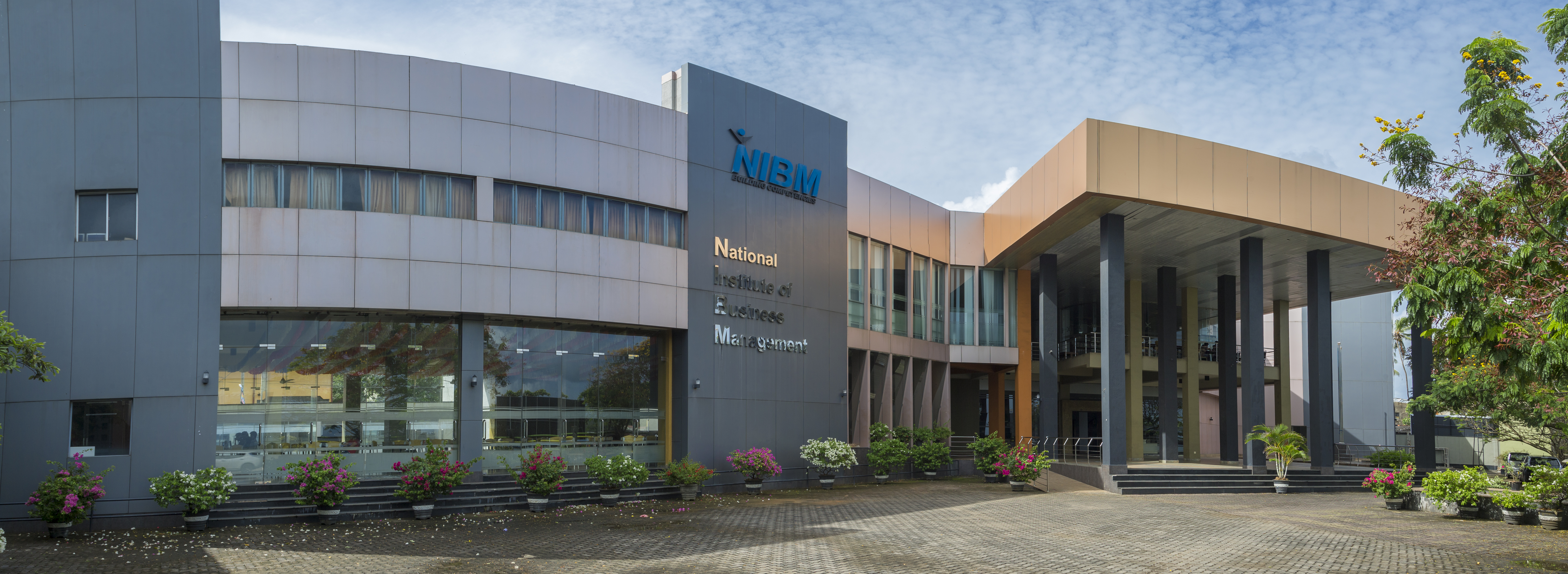
NIBM, Galle

The Advanced Technological Institute in Labuduwa, Galle was started in 2000, and it planned to offer Higher National Diploma in Information Technology and Higher National Diploma in Agriculture Technology – HNDT (Agri). Since then, Labuduwa ATI has been a pioneer in technological education in Sri Lanka. The National Institute of Business Management in Galle was established in 2010 to provide higher education opportunities in the fields of information technology and business management. The Ruhunu National College of Education, operated under the auspices of the Ministry of Education, trains teachers training for government schools in Kurunduwatta, Galle. Additionally, the Amarasuriya Teachers' Training College for government school teachers is in Unawatuna, Galle.

- Advanced Technological Institute (ATI)
- National Institute of Business Management (NIBM)
- Ruhunu National College of Education
- Amarasuriya Teachers' Training College
- Mercantile Seamen Training Institute (MSTI)

== Transport ==
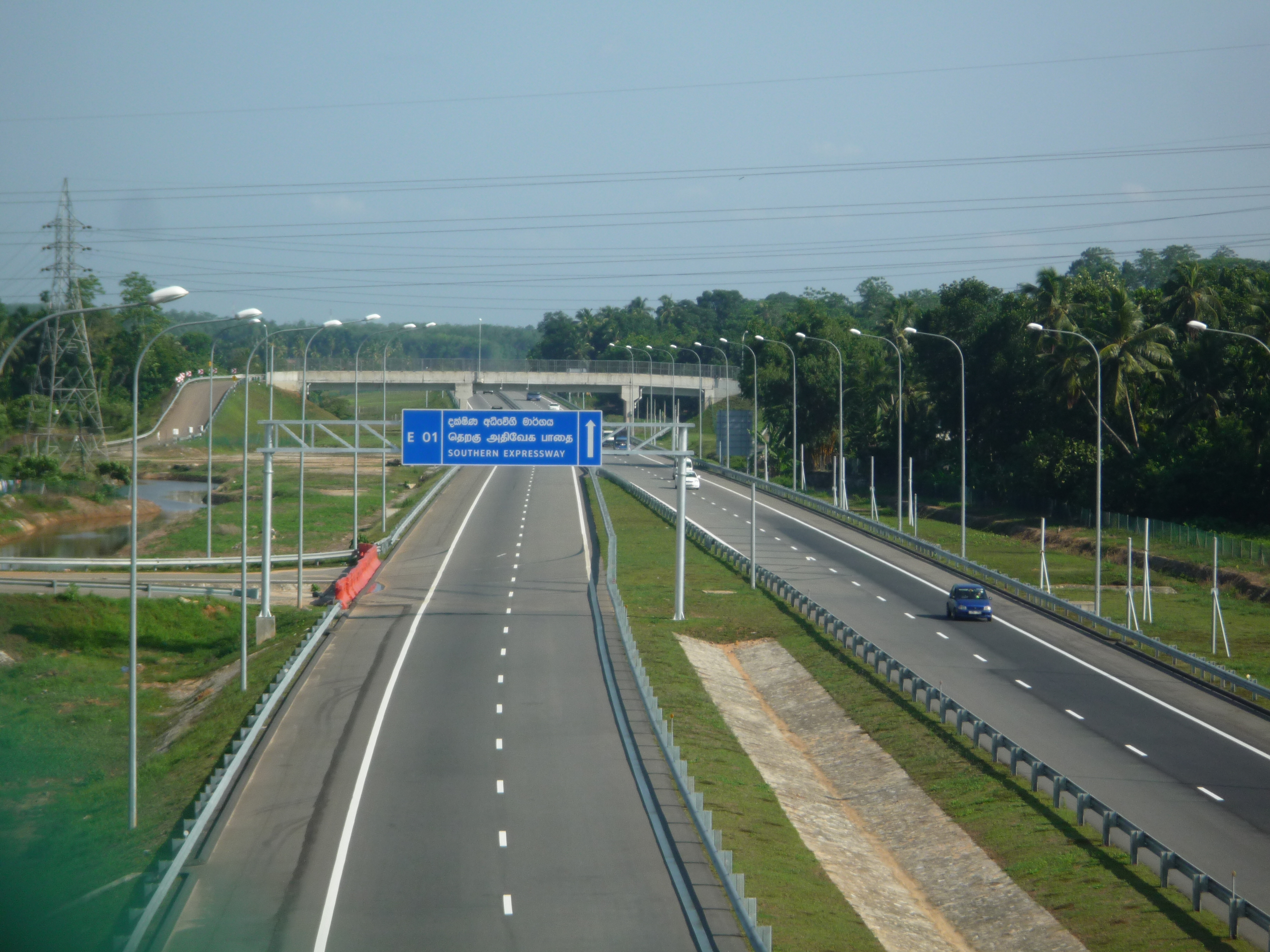
Southern Expressway

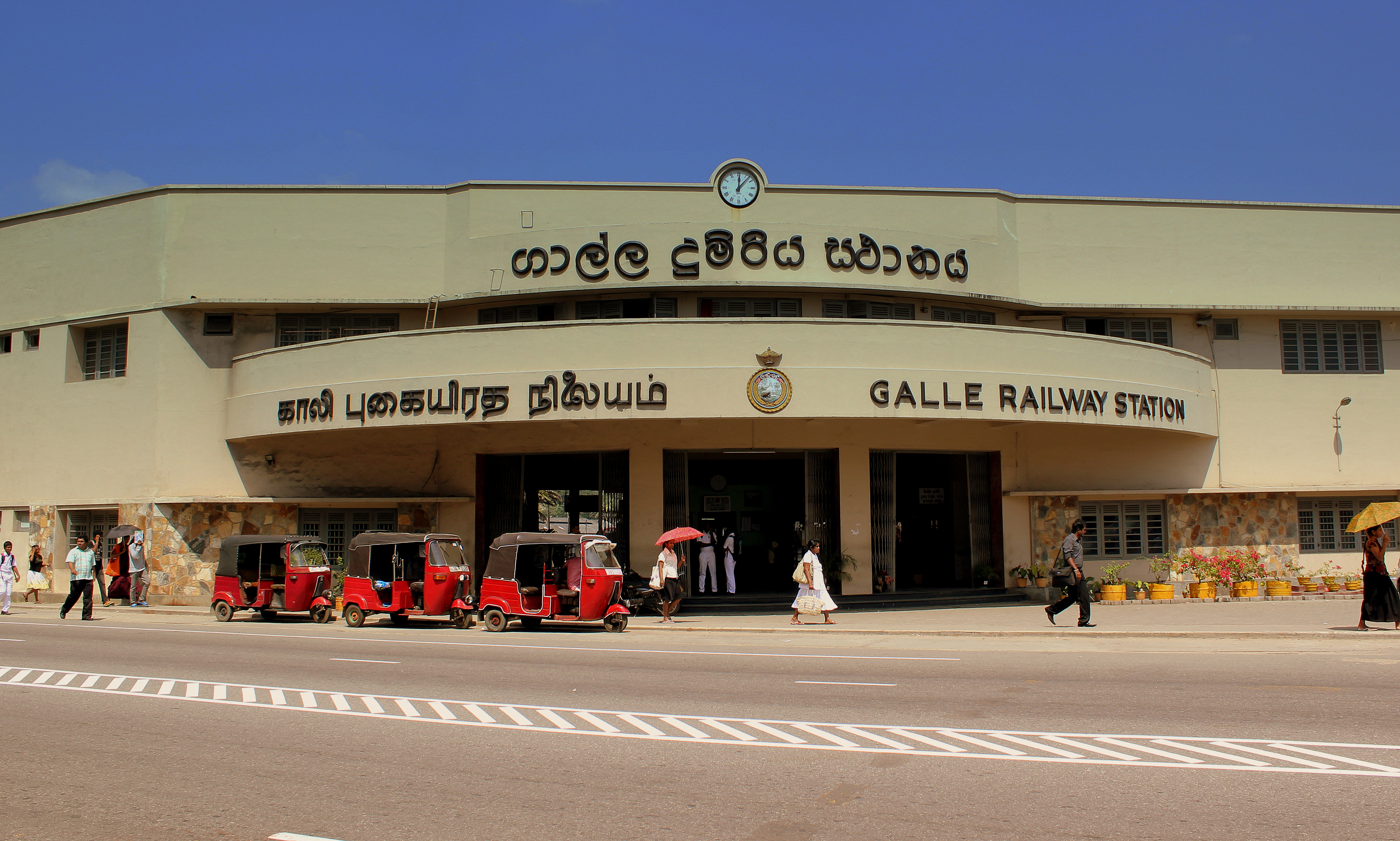
Galle Railway Station

Galle is served by Sri Lanka Railways' Coastal Line and is connected by rail to Colombo and Matara. Galle Railway Station is a major station on the line and serves as the meeting point of the west- and south-coast segments of the line. The A2 highway, which is commonly known as the Galle Road, runs through the city and connects Galle to Colombo by the west-coast portion, and to Hambanthota by the south-coast portion. The Southern Expressway, Sri Lanka's first E Class highway, links the Sri Lankan capital Colombo with Galle and currently reduces the time spent for travel to one hour from the three hours taken by the regular A2 highway.

== Twin towns – sister cities ==
Galle is twinned with:

- Velsen, Netherlands

== Notable people ==
see Category:People from Galle

== See also ==
- Galle Fort
- Galle International Stadium
- Hikkaduwa
- Pilana Raja Maha Vihara
- Unawatuna
