= Galle District =

- Administrative District
- Map of Sri Lanka with Galle District highlighted
- Coordinates: 6.25°N 80.25°E
- Country: Sri Lanka
- Province: Southern Province
- Largest City: Galle
- Divisions: List: Divisional Secretariats: 19; Grama Niladhari: 896

Government
  - District Secretary: Somarathna Vidanapathirana
  - Local: List: Municipal Councils: 3; Urban Councils: 1; Pradeishiya Sabhas: 17

Area
  - Total: 1,652 km^{2} (638 sq mi)
  - Land: 1,617 km^{2} (624 sq mi)
  - Water: 35 km^{2} (14 sq mi)
- Elevation: 28 m (92 ft)

Population (2012)
  - Total: 1,058,771
  - Density: 654.8/km^{2} (1,696/sq mi)
- Time zone: UTC+05:30 (Sri Lanka)
- ISO 3166 code: LK-31
- Website: eapps.galle.dist.gov.lk

Galle (Sinhala: ගාල්ල දිස්ත්‍රික්කය gālla distrikkaya; Tamil: காலி மாவட்டம் Kāli māvattam) is a district in Southern Province, Sri Lanka. It is one of 25 districts of Sri Lanka, the second level administrative division of the country. The district is administered by a District Secretariat headed by a District Secretary (previously known as a Government Agent) appointed by the central government of Sri Lanka.

== Geological background ==
Its area is 1,652 km^{2} (638 sq mi): 35 km^{2} (14 sq mi) is water and 1,617 km^{2} (624 sq mi) is land. Galle District is bounded on the north by the Benthara River, south and west by the Indian Ocean and east by Matara and Ratnapura districts. The topography of the Galle District is very diverse. The climatic condition of Hiniduma Patthuwa is very similar to the central hill country of Sri Lanka. This area consists of rainforests, which is the water catchment area for most of the rivers and lakes that flow across the Galle District. Sinharaja Forest Reserve is one of them. Galle district lies in a temperate climatic zone.

Annual rainfall is between 2000–2500mm. The river Gin River ("Gin Ganga") starts from Gongala Hill of Hiniduma Patthuwa and in its long journey of 113 km (70 mi). It passes Neluwa, Thawalama, Nagoda Baddegama and Thelikada areas. The river nourishes the land to the extent of 922 km^{2} (356 sq mi). It flows to the Indian Ocean in the Ginthota area of Galle District. The river Madu Ganga starts from Polathu Kanda and flows to the sea from Balapitiya and helps to maintain ecological balance in the Galle district.

== Historical background ==
In ancient Sri Lanka, Galle District secured an important place in the battles against enemies as the capital city of Southern Province. Ancient legends reveal that in 1072 A.C. king Vijayabahu I started his battle against "Soli" in Thambalagamuwa of Hinidum Pattu. According to legends, during the reign of King Dambhadeniya Parakramabahu carried out his battle against Queen Sugala in the Galle District. Galle was a very important area during the reign of King Maha Parakramabahu and it very much helped the Dutch, Portuguese and English establish their kingdoms.

Galle was called "Gimhathitha." The Sinhalese pronunciation "Gaala" is derived from the word "gala" (stone). Gala implies the meeting place of bullock carts. Later it was pronounced as "Gaala" as there were large rocks and hills in the district.

== Cultural background ==
A number of individuals from the Galle district have made significant contributions to Sinhala literature. Thotagamuwa Vijayaba Pirivena, which was a famous educational institute in the Kotte era, produced a number of notable scholars. Hikkaduwe Sri Sumangala Thera, Migettuwatte Gunananda Thera, Martin Wickramasinghe, Ediriweera Sarachchandra, Seneka Bibile Nandadasa Kodagoda, Edwin Ariyadasa, M. B. Ariyapala, Gunadasa Amarasekera, D. J. Wimalasurendra, Senarath Paranavithana, A. T. Ariyaratne, Sirimal Ranawella and Ariyapala Gurunnanse are a number of notable residents of Galle.

The Galle Literary Festival is run each January.

== Demographics ==
=== Ethnicity ===
Ethnicity in Galle District (2024)
1. Sinhala (93.9%)
2. Sri Lankan Moors (4.16%)
3. Sri Lankan Tamils (1.60%)
4. Others (0.35%)

Like the rest of the Southern Province, Galle district is overwhelmingly Sinhala, with small Moor minorities.

=== Religion ===
Religion in Galle district (2024)
Religion	Percent
Buddhism	93.50%
Islam	4.20%
Hinduism	1.42%
Other Christianity	0.48%
Other or not stated	0.40%

94% of the population are Buddhists, 4.7% Muslim, 1.4% Hindu and 0.9% Christian.

== Major cities ==
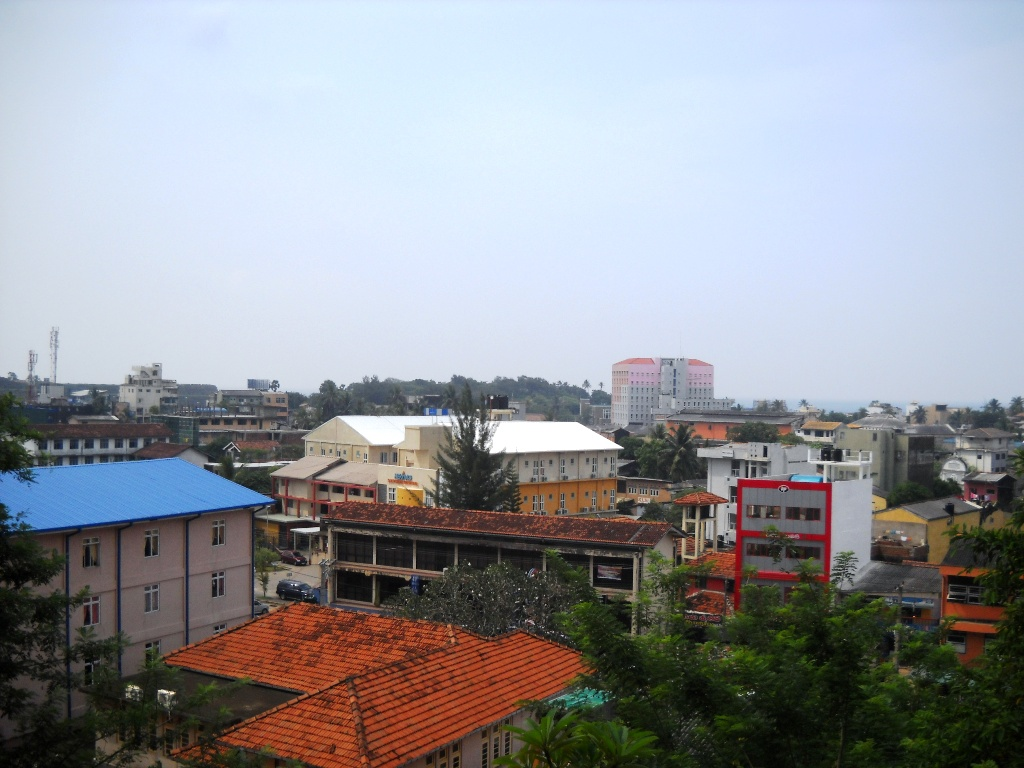
Galle, the main city in Galle district

- Galle (Galle Municipal Council)

== Suburbs of Galle ==
- Karapitiya
- Unawatuna

== Urban Councils ==
- Ambalangoda (Ambalangoda Urban Council)
- Hikkaduwa (Hikkaduwa Urban Council)

== Main Towns ==
- Ahangama
- Ahungalla
- Akurala
- Ambalangoda
- Baddegama
- Balapitiya
- Batapola
- Bentota
- Boossa
- Elpitiya
- Habaraduwa
- Hiniduma
- Hikkaduwa
- Imaduwa
- Karandeniya
- Koggala
- Kosgoda
- Mapalagama
- Nagoda
- Neluwa
- Pitigala
- Rathgama
- Thawalama
- Udugama
- Uragasmanhandiya
- Unawatuna
- Wanduramba
- Yakkalamulla

== World Heritage Sites ==
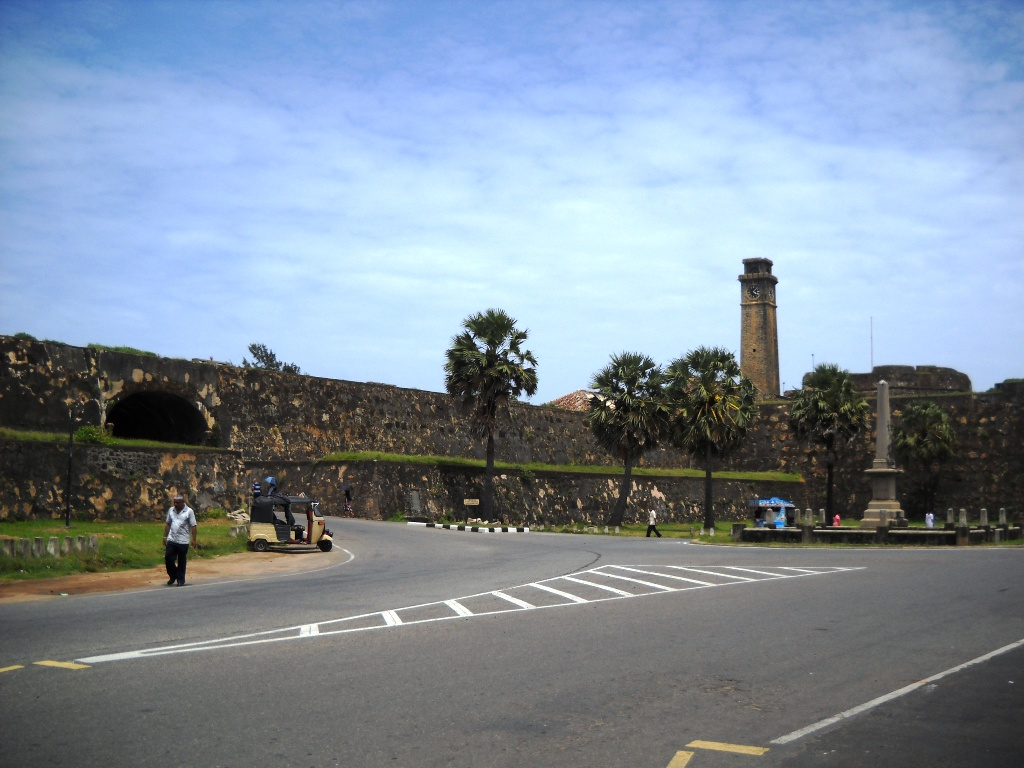
Galle Fort

- Galle Fort
- Sinharaja Forest Reserve

== Forest reserves ==
- Hiyare Forest Reserve
- Kanneliya Forest Reserve

== Maps ==
- Galle and vicinity in map of Sri Lanka
