= Kailasanathar Temple, Nedungudi =

Shiva temple in Tamil Nadu, India

Kailasanathar Temple
- Location in India

Religion
- Affiliation: Hinduism
- District: Pudukkottai district
- Deity: Shiva

Location
- Location: Nedungudi, Pudukkottai
- Country: India
- Interactive map of Kailasanathar Temple

Kailasanathar Temple is a Siva temple in Nedungudi in Pudukkottai district in Tamil Nadu, India.

== Location ==
This temple is located in Karaikkudi-Aranthangi road, at a distance of 1 km. from Keelanilakottai.

== Purana ==
In the purana days in Nedungudi, so many vilva trees were found. Two brothers - elder brother Perunjeevi and younger brother Siranjeevi - wanted to worship the deity. Perunjeevi asked Siranjeevi to bring a linga from Varanasi. As advised by his elder brother he went there. As he did not return in time, Perunjeevi consecrated a linga and started worshipping it. After coming late, Siranjeevi asked his brother to install that Linga and worship it also. When he refused he started to do penance by worshipping Vishnu. The asura brothers was advised by Vishnu to worship the Shiva in unison so that in future the place would get importance.

== Presiding deity ==
The presiding deity is known as Kailasanathar and Kasinathar. The goddess is known as Prasannanayaki. Apart from the shrine of the goddess, of 13th century CE., and other shrines, this temple have artha mandapa, maha mandapa and Garbhagriha. This temple is located on a hill. It is said that in earlier days while doing Abhiṣeka to the presiding deity with milk, the milk would found in the steps of Kashi Vishwanath Temple of Varanasi. So, the presiding deity is also known as 'Padikkasunathar'. The temple tree is Vilva.

== Festivals ==
The temple is opened for worship from 6.00 to 12.00 noon and 4.30 to 8.30 p.m.Pujas are held four times daily at Kalasanthi (8.30 a.m.), Uttchikkalam (noon 12.00), Sayaratchai (6.00 p.m.) and arthajamam (8.00 p.m.).Vaikasi visakam, Navarathri, Pournami, Amavasai and on the first day of the month girivalam and special pujas to nandhi on Pradosha are held. It is believed that taking a holy bath in the Pambaru river in the foothills of the temple would give the devotees well being. On the day of Adippuram, festival is held for the goddess.
