= Koneswaram Temple =

Hindu temple in Sri Lanka

Koneswaram Kovil
- திருக்கோணேச்சரம் Tirukkōṇēsvaram kōṇanāta cuvāmi ālayam
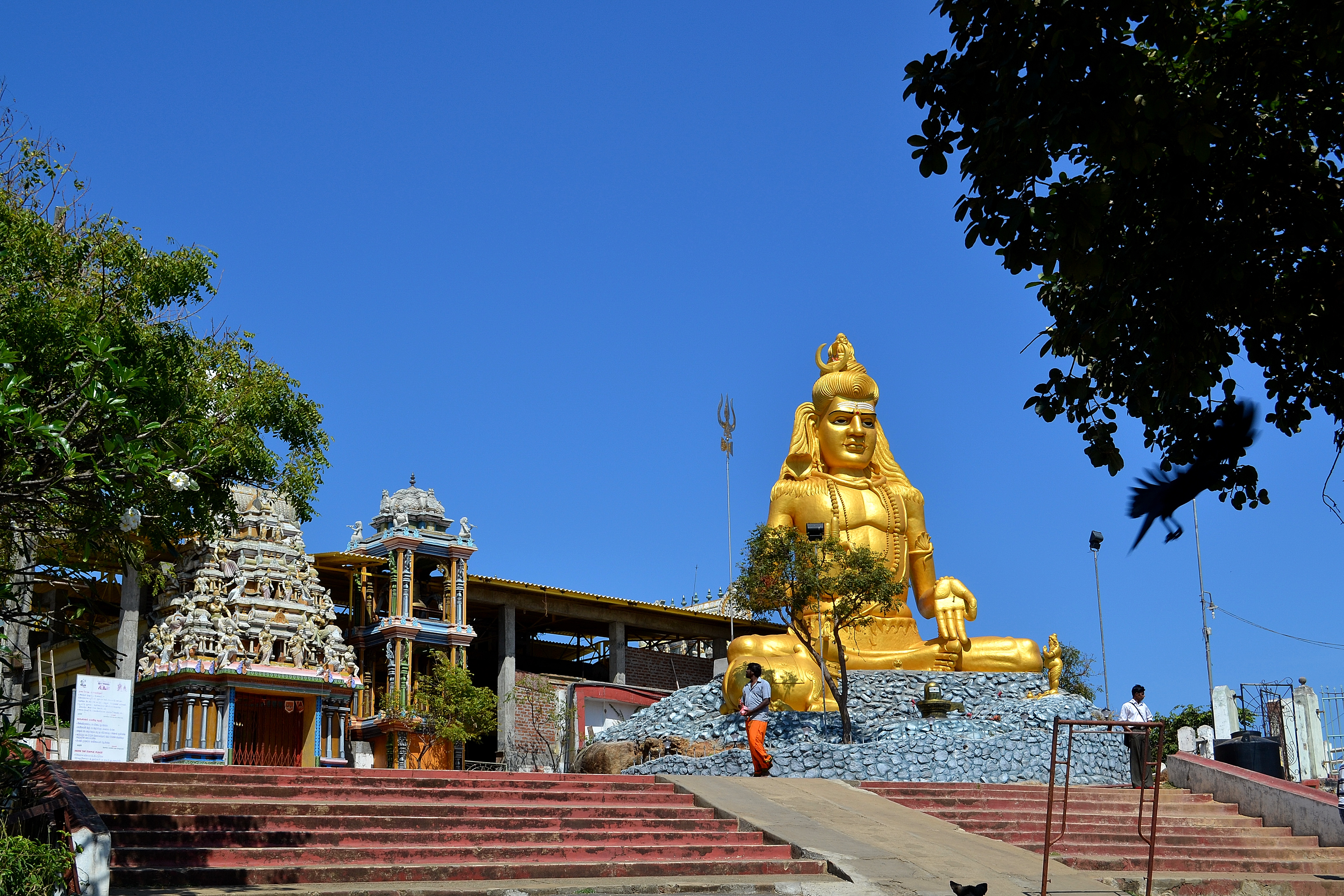
- View of Temple before recent Kumbhabhishekham

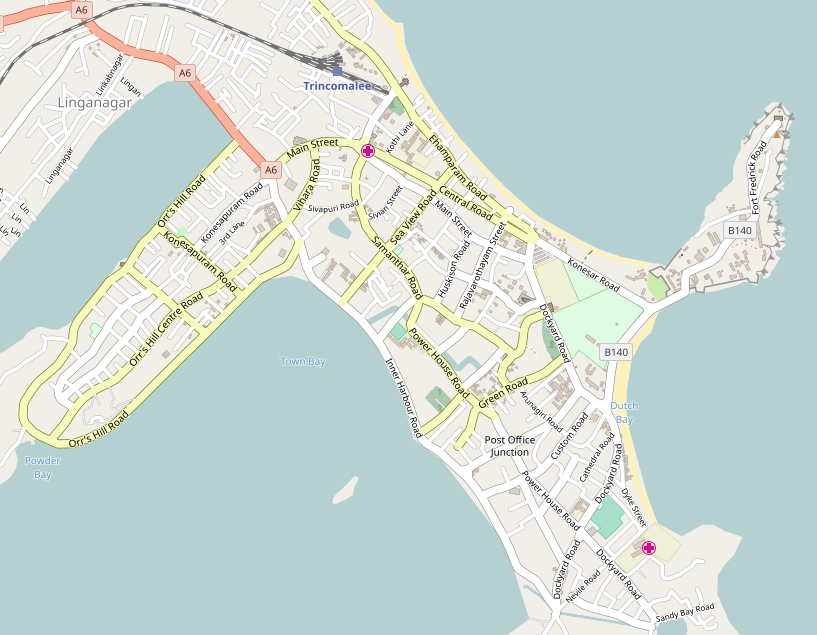
- Location in central Trincomalee

Religion
- Affiliation: Hinduism
- District: Trincomalee District
- Province: Eastern
- Deity: Konanātha Swami, Māthumai

Location
- Location: Swami Rock (Kōṇāmalai), Trincomalee
- Country: Sri Lanka
- Coordinates: 8°34′57″N 81°14′44″E

Architecture
- Type: Tamil architecture
- Completed: Earliest records from the 6th century BCE, restored 1952

Koneswaram Temple of Trincomalee (Tamil: திருக்கோணேச்சரம் கோயில்) or Thirukonamalai Konesar Temple – The Temple of the Thousand Pillars and Dakshina-Then Kailasam (Southern / Ancient Kailash) is a classical-medieval Hindu temple complex in Trincomalee, a Hindu religious pilgrimage centre in Eastern Province, Sri Lanka. The most sacred of the Pancha Ishwarams of Sri Lanka, it was built significantly during the ancient period on top of Konesar Malai, a promontory overlooking Trincomalee District, Gokarna bay and the Indian Ocean. The monument contains its main shrine to Shiva in the form Kona-Ishvara, shortened to Konesar.

The original kovil combined key features to form its basic Dravidian temple plan, such as its thousand pillared hall – "Aayiram Kaal Mandapam" – and the Jagati. Regarded as the greatest building of its age for its architecture, elaborate sculptural bas-relief ornamentation adorned a black granite megalith while its multiple gold plated gopuram towers were expanded in the medieval period. One of three major Hindu shrines on the promontory with a colossal gopuram tower, it stood distinctly on the cape's highest eminence.

The journey for pilgrims in the town begins at the opening of Konesar Road and follows a path through courtyard shrines of the compound to the deities Bhadrakali, Ganesha, Vishnu Thirumal, Surya, Raavana, Ambal-Shakti, Murukan and Shiva who presides at the promontory's height. The annual Koneswaram Temple Ther Thiruvilah festival involves the Bhadrakali temple of Trincomalee, the Pavanasam Theertham at the preserved Papanasuchunai holy well and the proximal Back Bay Sea (Theertham Karatkarai) surrounding Konesar Malai.

The Sinhalese king Gajabahu II who ruled Polonnaruwa from 1131 to 1153 CE is described in the Konesar Kalvettu as a devout worshipper of Shiva and a benefactor of the temple of Konamalai. He spent his last days in the associated Brahmin settlement of Kantalai. (Note: “He performed Brahmanical sacrifices, worshipped at the Saiva shrine of Konesvaram in Trincomalee and spent his last days in the Brahmana settlement at Kantalay.”)

The complex was destroyed in colonial religious attacks between 1622 and 1624 and a fort was built at the site from its debris. A 1632-built temple located away from the city houses some of its original idols. Worldwide interest was renewed following the discovery of its underwater and land ruins, sculptures and Chola bronzes by archaeologists and Arthur C. Clarke. It has been preserved through restorations, most recently in the 1950s. Granted ownership of villages in its floruit to form the Trincomalee District, Trincomalee village is located on the cape isthmus within the compounds. Revenue from the temple provides services and food to local residents.

Koneswaram has many strong historical associations. The shrine is described in the Vayu Purana, the Konesar Kalvettu and Tevaram hymns by Sambandhar and Sundarar as a Paadal Petra Sthalam along with its west coast Ishwaram counterpart Ketheeswaram temple, Mannar, and was praised for its tradition by Arunagirinathar upon his visit. The Dakshina Kailasa Puranam and Manmiam works note it as Dakshina/Then Kailasam (Mount Kailash of the South) for its longitudinal position and pre-eminence, it lies directly east of Kudiramalai west coast Hindu port town, while it is the easternmost shrine of the five ancient Ishwarams of Shiva on the island.

Mentioned as a widely popular bay temple of the island in the Mahabharata, Ramayana and Yalpana Vaipava Malai, the Mattakallappu Manmiam confirms its sacred status for all Hindus. Kachiyappa Sivachariar's Kanda Puranam compares the temple to Thillai Chidambaram Temple and Mount Kailash in Saivite esteem.

== Etymology ==
Maps of Trincomalee

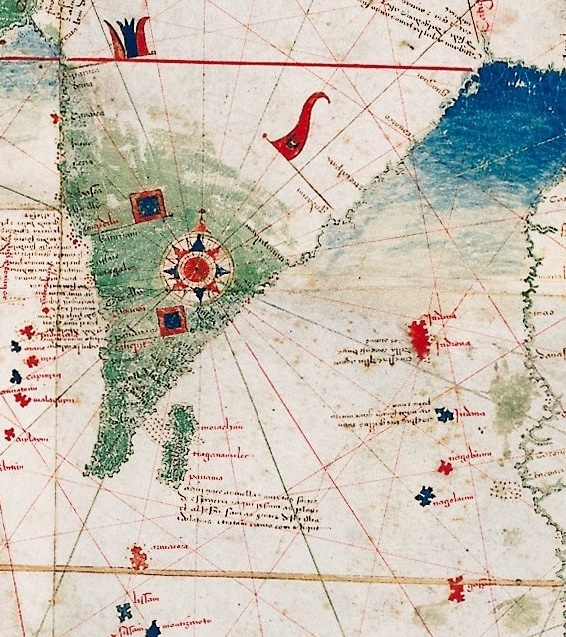
Cantino map of 1502, showing three Tamil towns on east coast, Mullaitivu, Trincomalee (Traganamalee) and Pannoam.

According to Professor S. Pathmanathan, "the name Kōnesvaram is derived from the Sanskrit expression Gokarnesvara, which was applied as the name of the form of Shiva for whose worship the temple at Tirukōnamalai had been dedicated". In India there exists three other important Shaiva shrines named Gokarna. The Gokarna Shiva temple in Kalinga (modern day Orissa) is also located on a mountain and the presiding deity is known as Gokarnasvamin. S. Pathmanathan states that both Shaiva shrines named Gokarna facing the eastern coastline and existing on mountains is not a coincidence, and that the Kōnesvaram temple was likely first established by settlers from Kalinga whose "favourite deity was Gokarnasvamin enshrined on the Mahendra mountain in Kalinga".

=== Kona, Ishvara and Trincomalee ===
In the Tamil language, temples are known as kovils,; thus the temple complex is known locally as Konecaram Kovil (Tamil: கோணேச்சரம்), the abode of Kona—Ishvara (the Chief Lord or God). The presiding Shiva deity's names are Konesar (Tamil: கோணேசர்) (pronounced Konechar or Konasir – a compound of Kona and Ishvara), Koneswaran, Kona—Natha and the goddess consort is called Mathumai Amman (another name for Mother goddess Amman). It later earned the title Thiru Koneswaram Kovil. Trincomalee, the coastal peninsula town where Koneswaram is located is an Anglicized form of the old Tamil word "Thiru-kona-malai" (Tamil: திருகோணமலை), meaning "Lord of the Sacred Hill", its earliest reference in this form found in the Tevaram of the seventh century by Sampandar.

Thiru is a word generally used to denote a "sacred" temple site while Malai means mountain or hill; Middle Tamil manuscripts and inscriptions mention the monumental compound shrine as the Thirukonamalai Konesar Kovil.

Greek writer Strabo, quoting Eratosthenes and Onesicritus notes the island's proximity to the southernmost regions of India, next to the country of the "Koniakoi people," found south up to a coastal promontory on an eastern limit, and describes the island as extending towards Ethiopia and being home to elephants. The temple was constructed atop Swami Rock, also called Swami Malai or Kona-ma-malai, a cliff on the peninsula that drops 400 feet (120 metres) directly into the sea.

=== Gokarna bay and Bhadrakali Koneswaram temple, Trincomalee ===
Mahabharata on Koneswaram

"Listen as I now recount the isle of Tamraparni below Pandya-desa and KanyaKumari, gemmed upon the ocean. The gods underwent austerities there, in a desire to attain greatness. In that region also is the lake of Gokarna. Then one should go to Gokarna, renowned in the three worlds. O Indra among kings! It is in the middle of the ocean and is worshipped by all the worlds. Brahma, the Devas, the rishis, the ascetics, the bhutas (spirits or ghosts), the yakshas, the pishachas, the kinnaras, the great nagas, the siddhas, the charanas, the gandharvas, humans, the pannagas, rivers, ocean and mountains worship Uma's consort there". Mahabharata. Volume 3. pp. 46–47, 99.

— Vyasa, Mahabharata. c.401 BCE Corroborating the map of Ptolemy drawn four hundred years later, this text also elaborates on two ashrams of the Siddhar Agastya in the region, one near the bay and another atop the Malaya mountain range.

The Trincomalee Harbour, a circular natural harbour which the temple crowns towards the north, is referred to in Sanskrit as Gokarna (Cow's Ear) and the deity's name Gokarneswara or Go—Natha. Pathmanathan offers the etymological link Thiru-Gokarna-Malai or Thiru-Gona-Malai based on this connection.

The ethnographer Megasthenes writing in his Indica from 350 to 290 BCE, describes the island as being divided by a long river, productive of a large number of gold and pearls in one half and that the inhabitants of this country are called Paleogoni, meaning Old Goni in Tamil and Greek, who Pliny adds worshipped Hercules and Dionysus (Bacchus) like the Pandyans of Tamilakam.

The Vayu Purana, written in 300 CE specifically mentions the tallest mountain peak of the great gold and silver rich mountain range Malaya on the island, and that "to the east of this island at the shore of the sea lies a great Siva temple in a holy place called Gokarna." Gokarna is also a place name in Karnartaka, India, Kalinga, Tamil Nadu and Nepal all associated with ancient Shiva temples and some with Ravana of the Ramayana, the former temple in Karnartaka – the Mahabaleshwar Temple – also earning praise in the Tevaram. A major shrine to the deity Bhadrakali exists within the Mahabaleshwar Temple complex, and similarly the Bhadrakali Amman Temple of Trincomalee, dedicated to the same deity and significantly expanded by Rajendra Chola I, stands on Konesar Road before the entrance to Swami Rock.

=== Kailash of the South ===
Heralded as "Dakshina Kailasam"/"Then Kailasam" (Kailash of the South) because it lies on exactly the same longitude as the Tibetan mountain Mount Kailash (the primary abode of Shiva), Koneswaram's early black granite rock-cut architectural style shared similarities to Kailasanathar Temples of the subcontinent. Its traditional history and legends were compiled into the Sanskrit treatises Dakshina Kailasa Puranam – Sthala Puranam of Koneswaram, written in 1380 by Jeyaveera Cinkaiariyan, and the Dakshina Kailasa Manmiam – three chapters of the Skanda Puranam of unknown antiquity – manuscripts of which have been discovered and dated from the 5th – 7th century. It was in the Puranas that the shrine first found reference as Koneiswara Parwatia, motivating Kullakottan Chola who learnt of its sanctity to sail to Trincomalee and develop the temple.

The compiler of the Yoga Sutras, Patañjali's place of birth at the temple corroborates Tirumular's Tirumandhiram, which describes him as hailing from Then Kailasam and his self description as a "Gonardiya" from Gonarda, "a country in the southern and eastern division" of the Indian continent. Both men were ardent disciples of Nandhi. Patanjali famously visited the Thillai Nataraja Temple, Chidambaram, where he wrote the Charana Shrungarahita Stotram on Nataraja.

=== Matsya (Vishnu-Thirumal) and Shakti Koneswaram temples, Trincomalee ===
In Kanda Puranam, the epic authored by Kachiyappa Sivachariar, Koneswaram is venerated as one of the three foremost Shiva abodes in the world, alongside Thillai Chidambaram Temple and Mount Kailash. The Vishnu-Thirumal shrine of the Koneswaram complex repaired by Kullakottan Chola was referred to as the Thirukonamalai Macchakeswaram/Macceswaram Kovil in some Middle Tamil inscriptions such as the Nilaveli inscription of the 10th century, a Tamil rendering of the Sanskrit Matsyakesvara. In fact, Matsya is the fish incarnation of Vishnu, and this shrine's significance along with that of the third pagoda of the promontory to the goddess is expounded further in the Dakshina Kailasa Puranam and the Thirukonasala Puranam.

The temple's "Aayiram Kaal Mandapam" earned it the title Pagoda of Trincomalee – Temple of a Thousand Columns among Europeans. The rocky promontory is dedicated to Siva in his ancient form of Kona-Ishvara, and is a major centre of pilgrimage today. The worship of Ishvara is noted to have been the original worship of the island; Charles Pridham, Jonathan Forbes and George Turnour state that it is probable there is no more ancient form of worship existing than that of Ishvara upon his sacred promontory.

== History ==
=== Origins and date of establishment ===
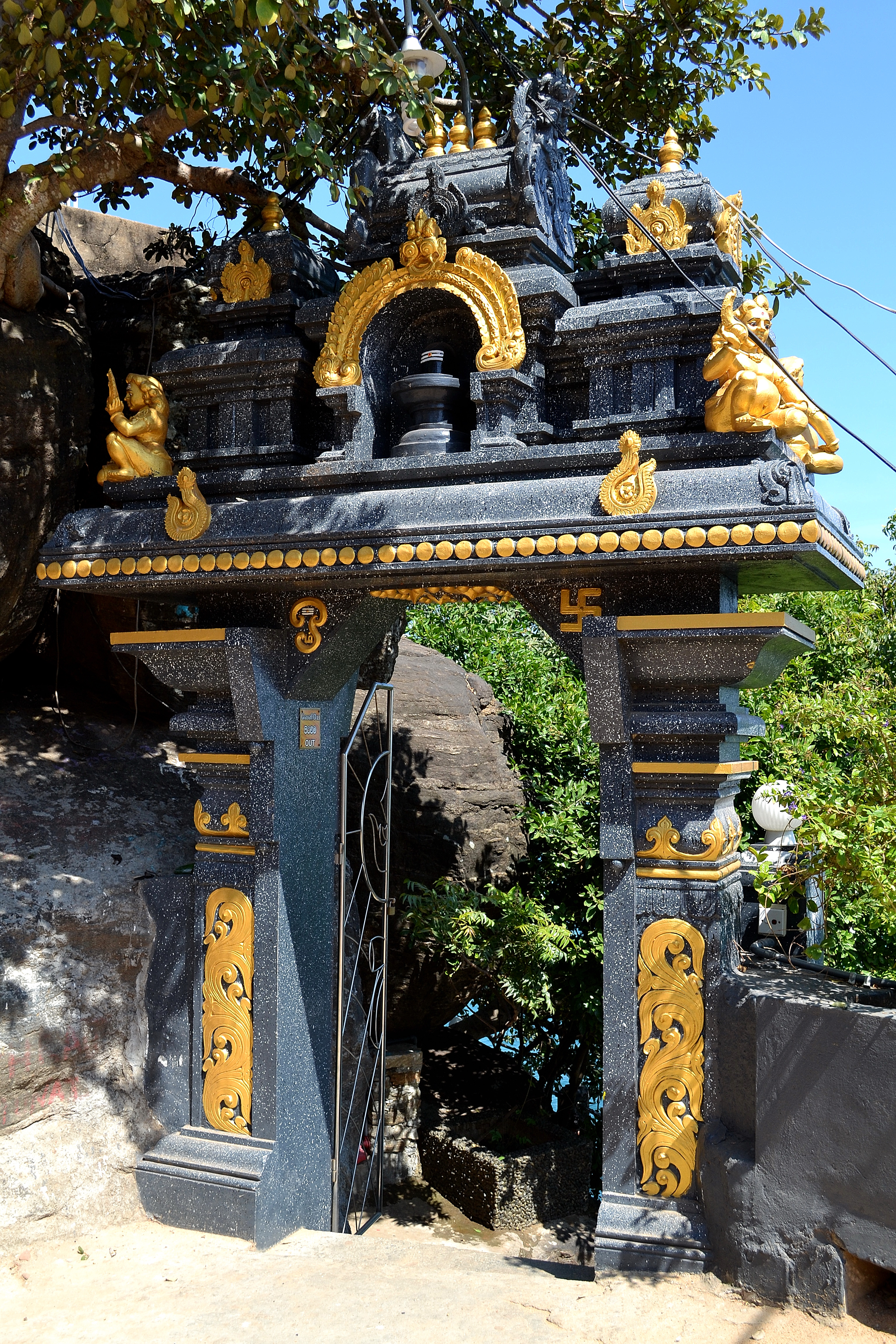
Decorated gateway at Koneswaram

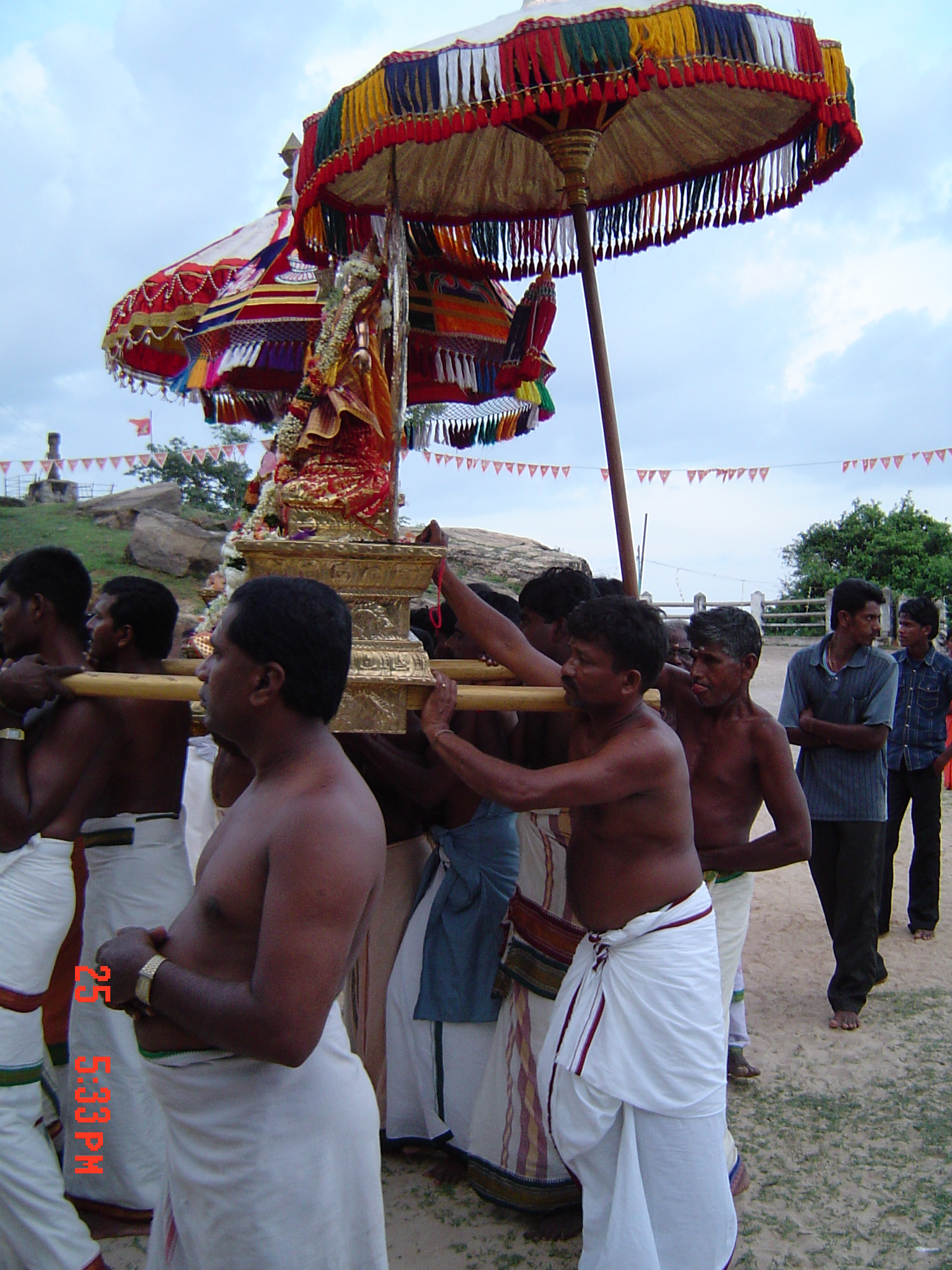
Koneswaram Idol Procession

Decorated gateway at partially restored Koneswaram (left). Koneswaram idol is taken on a procession around the temple, with pillar from the ruins in the background (right)

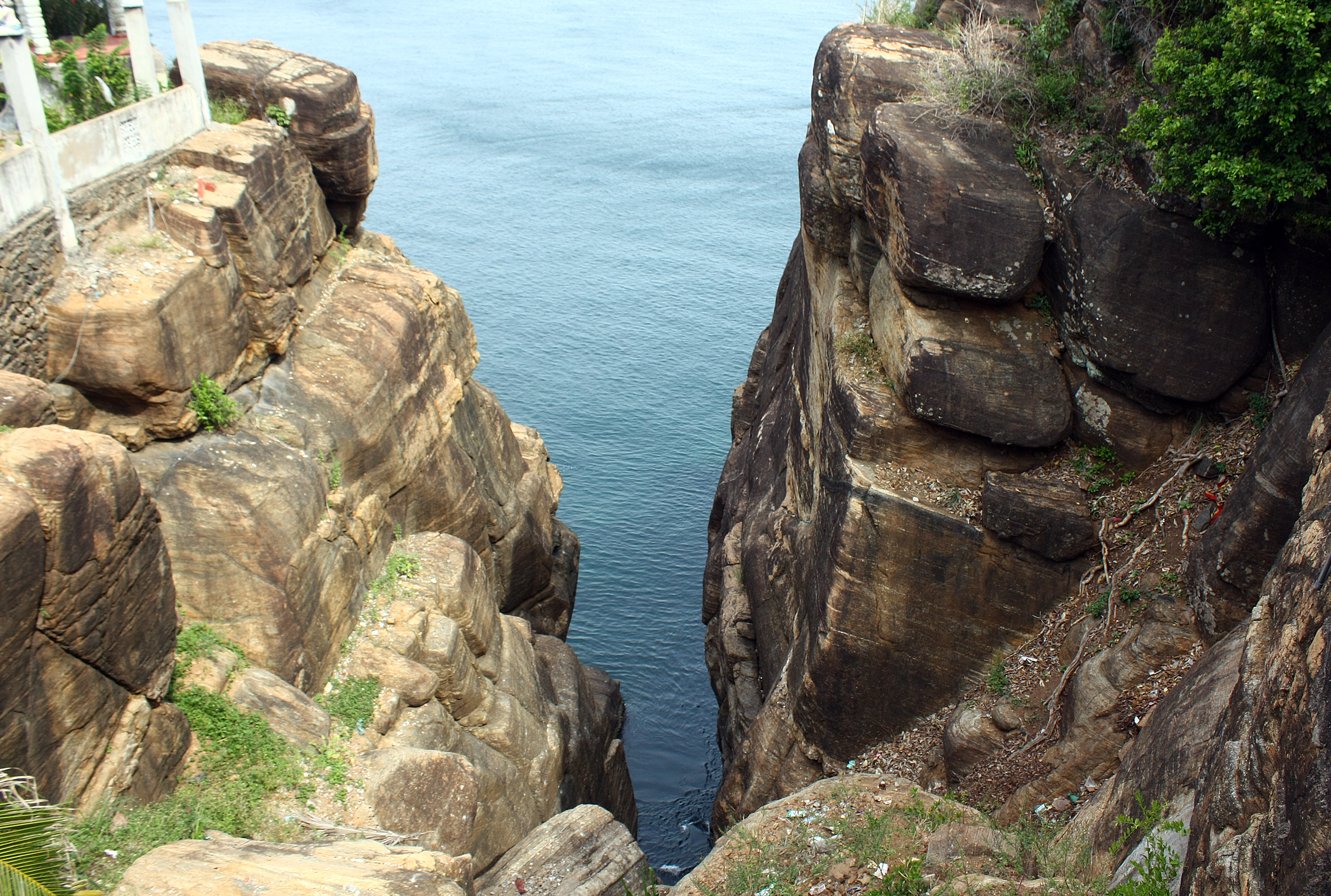
Lovers' Leap or Ravana's Cleft at Swami Rock temple entrance.

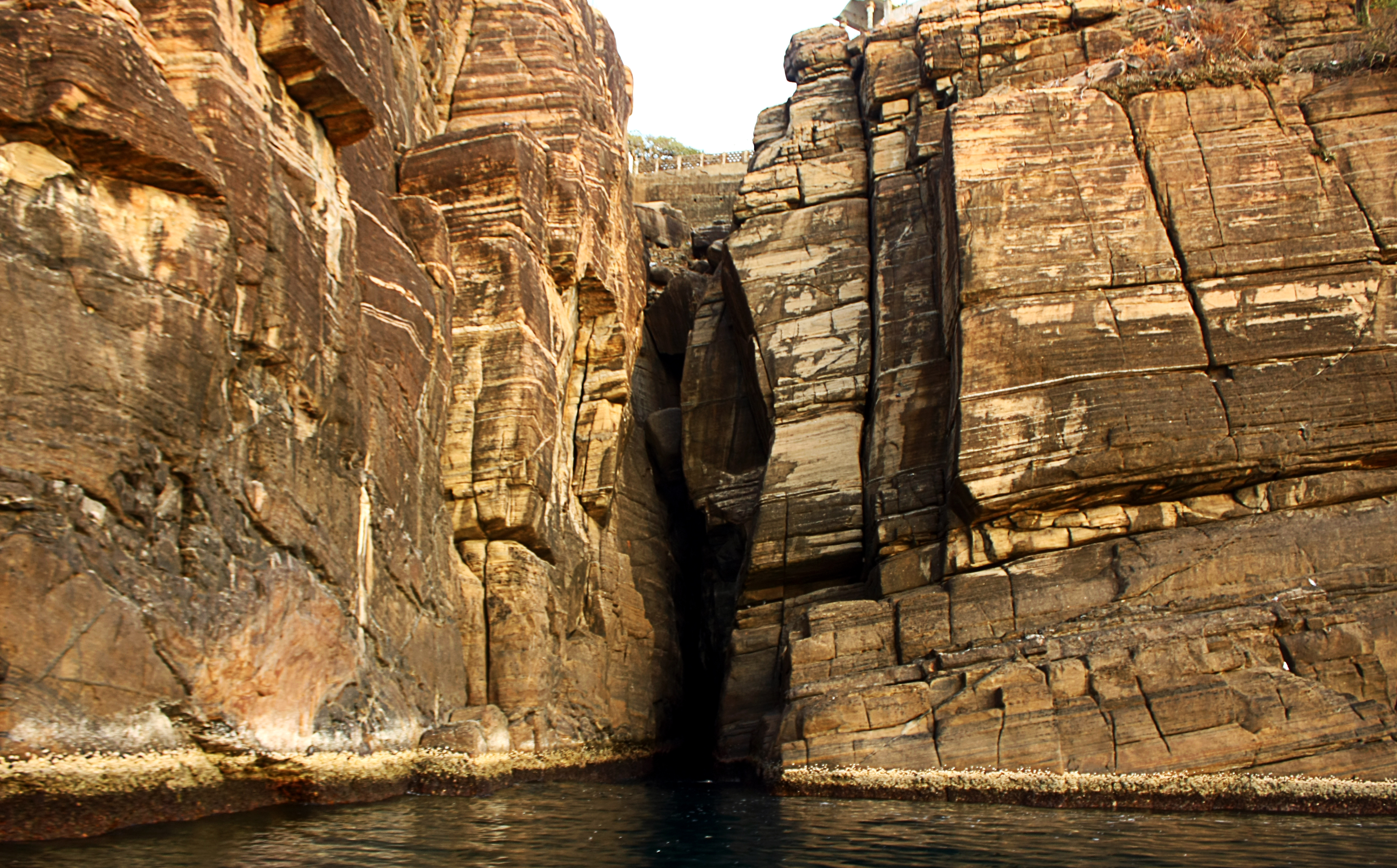
Lovers' Leap or Ravana's Cleft seen from sea.

Ravana's Cleft at Swami Rock (Konamalai). It is 350 feet above the sea level and looks straight down into the ocean below (top). Cleft can be seen clearly from sea side by using any watercraft (bottom).

The construction time of Koneswaram has been estimated by comparison between carved reliefs on the temple's ruins, literature on the shrine and the inscriptions commonly used in royal charters from the 5th to 18th centuries but its exact date of birth remains vague. The evidence extant attests to the shrine's classical antiquity. Construction of Hindu temples was made possible due to the prevalent faith amongst the locals and mercantile communities in the region during the Sangam period. Kaviraja Varothiyan's Tamil poem inscribed on the Konesar Kalvettu, the 17th-century stone inscription chronicle of the temple, gives the shrine's date of birth as circa 1580 BCE. Archaeologists point to its initial phase consisting of a rock cave, multilayered brick shrine style popularly constructed to Tamil deities of a range of faiths during the Sangam period (see Religion in ancient Tamil country).

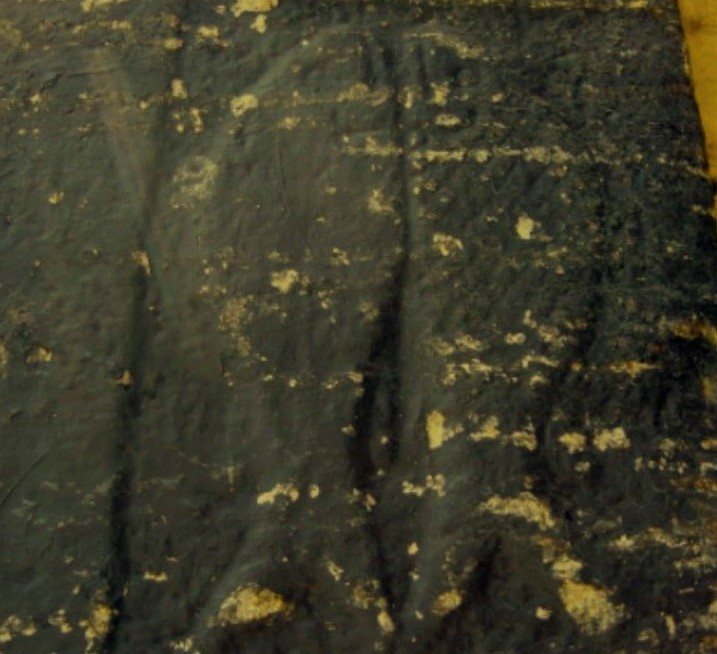
Jatavarman Veera Pandyan I's double fish carp black granite bas-relief of the temple, reminiscent of the dynasty's coinage symbols found on the island from the pre-modern era, installed after defeating the usurper Chandrabhanu of Tambralinga

Contemporary historians such as S. Pathmanathan and Paul E. Peiris suggest Koneswaram temple has a recorded history from 300, when it finds mention in the Vayu Purana. Peiris notes that Koneswaram was one of the five recognised Iswarams of the Hindu deity Shiva in Lanka before the sixth century BCE; a widely famous centre of deity worship long before the arrival of the mythical exile Vijaya to the island, attributed to the period 543—505 BCE. Koneswaram is the easternmost shrine of the Iswarams, the others being Naguleswaram (Keerimalai), Thiruketheeswaram (Mannar), Munneswaram (Chilaw) and Tenavaram (Tevan Thurai). The historian Diogo de Couto of the 16th century adds Ramanathaswamy Temple, Rameswaram to this group of principle temples in the region most revered on the Indian subcontinent. Other writers point to the worship of Ishvara by mythical royals on the island like Kuveni before the exile's arrival. Pathmanathan differs from Peiris in his view on the shrine's birth however, stating that Koneswaram temple was most likely established as a Hindu shrine by the mercantile communities that frequented the island from the fourth-century BCE. Kalinga region in India, where another temple dedicated to Shiva in the form Gokarnasvamin at Mahendra mountains is found. The Yalpana Vaipava Malai, an 18th-century Tamil chronicle connects the figure Vijaya and seven hundred of his followers to the shrine, stating they extensively repaired the five Iswarams upon their arrival to the island, before mixing with native tribes on the island forming matrimonial links with the Tamil kingdom through Pandyan queens. The Encyclopædia Britannica currently appears to follow this view, although in volume 10 of the encyclopedia, printed in 1974, the shrine's establishment is attributed to Tamil migrants. Encyclopedia Americana and New International Encyclopedia note that early Tamil rulers erected the temple of a thousand columns on the hilltop.

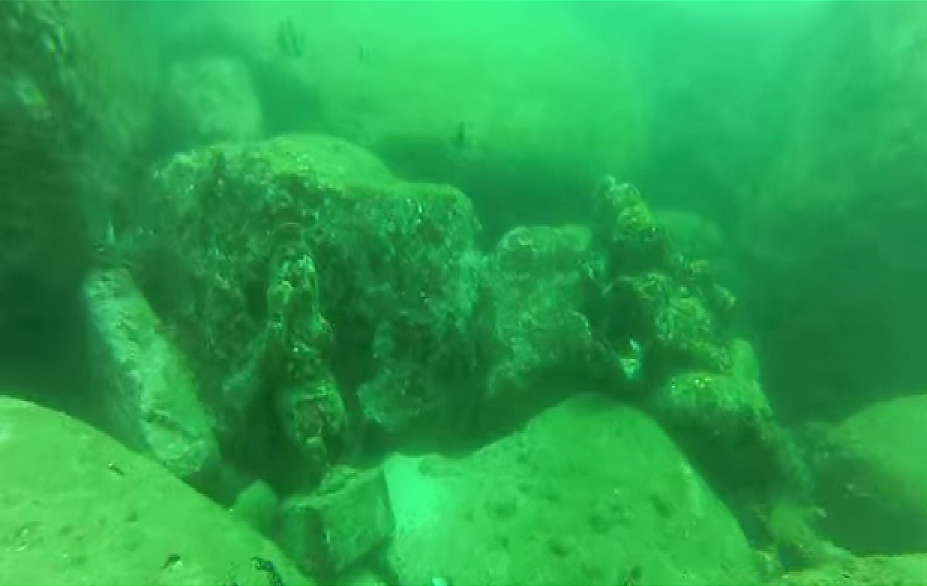
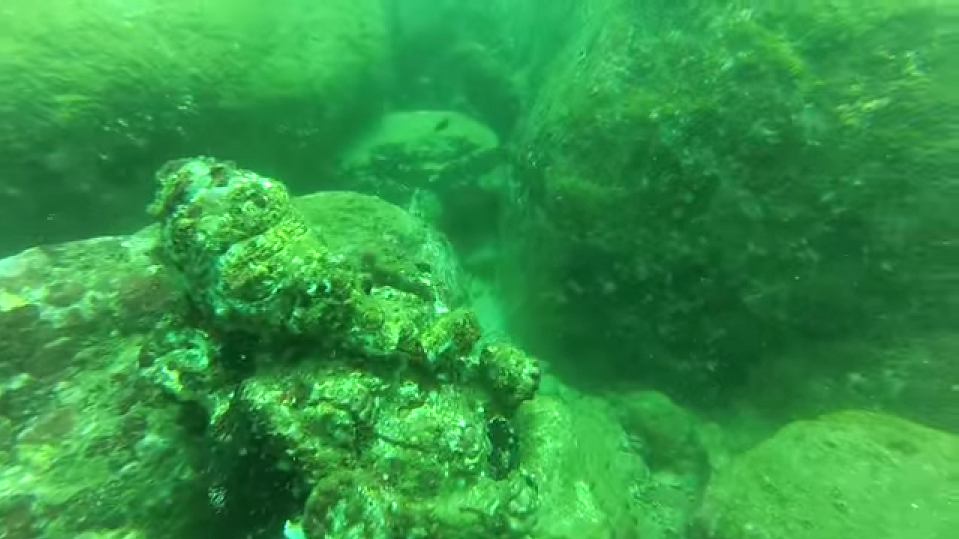
Ruins of the Koneswaram temple underwater

The prince Kulakottan of the Chola Dynasty extensively renovated the Koneswaram temple and the Kantalai Tank, responsible for irrigating plains belonging to the shrine. Due to royal patronage by various Tamil dynasties from the early classical to medieval era, the temple flourished in the early centuries of the First Millennium. Hindus built at least three great stone temples with gopura on Swami Rock during Koneswaram's zenith, one to Vishnu-Thirumal, one to the goddess and the principal temple of the complex to Shiva at its highest eminence.

=== Naga Nadu, pre 377 BCE ===
Mahabharata, the Hindu epic written between 400 and 100 BCE, notes that Koneswaram is at Gokarna bay in the middle of the ocean and is the island shrine of Uma's consort Shiva, known in the three worlds and worshiped by all peoples from the subcontinent, including the native tribes Naga, Deva and the Yaksha, the rivers, ocean and mountains. It continues that the shrine is the next pilgrimage spot for Hindus en route south following Kanyakumari of the early Pandyan kingdom and Tamiraparni island (Kudiramalai) and that worshipers should fast for three days at the temple. In the same time period, the Ramayana in written form describes how King Ravana and his mother had worshipped Shiva at the shrine, when the former wanted to remove the temple of Koneswaram when his mother was in ailing health. This literature continues that as the king was heaving the rock, Shiva made him drop his sword. As a result of this a cleft was created on the rock, today called Ravana Vettu – meaning Ravana's Cleft.

=== Restoration in Anuradhapura kingdom, 377 BCE–600 CE ===
Timeline of Koneswaram temple (BCE - 1982)
Founded as a Hindu temple complex dedicated to Shiva	(BCE)
Described in the Mahabharata and Ramayana	(400-100 BCE)
Developed by Elara Manu Needhi Chola	(235 BCE)
Birthplace of Patanjali, compiler of the Yoga Sutras	(200-150 BCE)
Temple restored by Chola king Kankan ("Kullakottan")	(103 - 88 BCE)
Mentioned by Dionysius Periegetes in Orbis Descriptio	(117-138)
Mentioned in Vayu Purana	(300)
Described by Rufius Festus Avienus in Geography of Avienus	(350)
Mentioned by Sambandhar and Sundarar in Tevarams	(600 - 630)
Mentioned in Skanda Puranam - Dakshina Kailasa Manmiam	(c. 650)
Mentioned by Kachiyapper in Kanda Puranam	(780)
Mentioned in several stone inscriptions	(1000 - 1200)
Described by Eustathius of Thessalonica	(1115 - 1196)
Mentioned in Dakshina Kailasa Puranam compiled by Jeyaveera Cinkaiariyan	(1380-1410)
Visited by Arunagirinathar, heralded in Thiruppugazh	(1468)
Destroyed by the Portuguese	(1622)
Successor temple built in Tampalakamam	(1650-1690)
Mentioned in Konesar Kalvettu	(1750)
Restored by Society for restoration of Koneswaram, Trincomalee	(1952 )
Renovations by concerned Tamils	(1982)

"Contemplator item qua se mare tendit in Austrum, Inque notum Oceanus freta ponti caerula curvat; Altaque coliadis mox hic tibi dorsa patescent rupis, et intenti spectabis cospitis arces".

-Translation: Mark also the point where the sea stretches out towards the South and the ocean curves the blue straits of the deep into its familiar paths and soon here the tall ridges of the Cholian rock will lie open before you and you will behold the towers of the roof stretched out.

— Geography of Avienus poem of Rufius Festus Avienius, 350 CE Latin geographer and writer on the island, based on Orbis descriptio by Alexandrian Greek poet Dionysius Periegetes (117—138 CE): (Inde convenus ante promontoriam Auatrale, Confestim ad magnam Coliadis insulam perveneris, Taprobanen Aaianoram elephantam genitricein), mentioning the island as the great "Island of Coliadis" whose inhabitants worship the multi-towered Cholian temple to Venus on their Cholian rock promontory, phallic-shaped and located at the end of the island's Ganges river by the ocean.

The Chola royal Kankan (Kulakkottan), a descendant of the legendary King Manu Needhi Cholan of Thiruvarur, Chola Nadu, restored the Koneswaram temple at Trincomalee and the Kantalai tank after finding them in ruins. He was the son of the king Vara Rama Tevan, who had been a prolific benefactor of the Konesar temple. Kulakkottan visited the Munneswaram temple on the west coast, before settling ancient Vanniars in the east of the island. According to the chronicles, he extensively renovated and expanded the shrine, constructed several lofty gopuram towers and lavished much wealth on it; he was crowned with the ephitet Kulakkottan meaning Builder of tank and temple. Further to the reconstruction, Kulakottan paid attention to agriculture cultivation and economic development in the area, inviting the Vanniar chief Tanniuna Popalen and several families to a new founded town in the area including Thampalakamam to maintain the Kantalai tank and the temple itself. The effects of this saw the Vanni region flourish. The Vanniar claim descent from this chief. Kullakottan's restorations took place despite interferences from the queen of the Pandyan King Pandia, who was absent from his throne in Anuradhapura on a visit to Jaffna. Kullakottan constructed and re-established the large temple of Shiva, the temple of Vishnu and that of the Mother-Goddess (Tirukkamakkottam) on the promontory, these shrines of the compound becoming the Three Pagodas of Tirukonamalai.

The Yalpana Vaipava Malai and Konesar Kalvettu, as well as a 16th-century Tamil inscription in Trincomalee and Tamil copper-plate inscriptions of the temple relate many details about Kullakottan's founding of Trincomalee and the Vanni. Modern historians and anthropologists agree as historically factual the connection of the Vanniars with the Konesar temple. Dating the reign of the king has proved difficult. The Konesar Kalvettu dates Kullakottan's renovations to specifically between 432 and 440. C. Rasanayagam notes that the Vanniar chiefs who were in control of the temple could not have multiplied so fast within 150 years causing the king Aggrabodhi I of Anuradhapura to take elaborate steps to contain the Vanniars in 593. He argues the Vanniars of the Vannimai were a buffer state between Trincomalee and Mannar from the classical period. Other historians suggest that Kullakottan arrived to the island during the island's reign of The Five Dravidians of Pandyan descent, between 103 and 88 BCE, corroborating the Yalpana Vaipava Malai equation of his grandfather Manu Needhi Chola's identity with that of Ellalan Chola, a historical king who ruled the island from 205 to 161 BCE that shared many character traits with the legendary Manu Needhi. In Geography of Avienus, a poem of Latin geographer and writer Rufius Festus Avienius in 350 CE, the author bases his writing on the island on Orbis descriptio by Alexandrian Greek poet Dionysius Periegetes (117—138 CE), who called the island the "great Island of Coliadis" whose inhabitants worship the multi-towered Cholian temple to Venus on their Cholian rock promontory by the sea. A twelfth-century commentary on Periegetes by Eustathius of Thessalonica also compares the shape of Konesar Malai to a phallus. The Portuguese historian De Quieroz cited poetic and inscriptional evidence to date Kullakottan's renovations to 1589 BCE, based on a Tamil poem by Kavi Raja Virothayan he read which was translated into English in 1831 by Simon Cassie Chitty. A major temple of the compound was built to the glory of the God Videmal by King Manica Raja 1300 years before the nativity according to Oud en Nieuw Oost-Indiën written in 1726 by François Valentijn. Some consider the story of Kullakotan to be mythical based on the travails of historical figures such as Gajabahu II, Kalinga Magha or a Chola regent of Sri Lanka.

=== Sixth-seventh century CE hymn, Pallava kingdom ===
In the 6th century, a special coastal route by boat travelled from the Jaffna peninsula southwards to the Koneswaram temple, and further south to Batticaloa to the Thirukkovil. Koneswaram temple of Kona-ma-malai is mentioned in the Saiva literature Tevaram in the late sixth century CE by Thirugnana Sambandar. Along with Ketheeswaram temple in Mannar, Koneswaram temple is praised in the same literature canon by the 8th century Nayanar Saint Sundarar in Tamilakkam. Koneswaram henceforth is glorified as one of 275 Shiva Sthalams (Shiva abodes glorified in the Tevarams) of the continent, part of the "Paadal Petra Sthalam" group. The only other temple from Eela Nādu (the country of the temple as named in the Tamil literature) is Ketheeswaram. During this period, the temple saw structural development in the style of Dravidian rock temples by the Tamil Pallava Dynasty. This occurred when Pallava King Narasimhavarman I (630–668 CE) armies conquered the island and when the island was under the sovereignty of his grandfather King Simhavishnu (537–590 CE), when many Pallava-built rock temples were erected in the region and this style of architecture remained popular in the next few centuries. The 8th–10th century Kanda Puranam (a Puranic Tamil literature epic and translation of the Skanda Puranam) authored by Kachiyappa Sivachariar of Kanchipuram describes the Koneswaram shrine as one of the three foremost Shiva abodes in the world, alongside Chidambaram temple in Tamil Nadu and Mount Kailash of Tibet. Several inscriptions written in the Tamil and Vatteluttu scripts interspersed with Grantha characters relate to the temple from this period. Koneswaram temple is mentioned in the 10th century Tamil Nilaveli inscriptions as having received a land grant in the Tamil country of one thousand seven hundred and ten acres (two hundred and fifty four vèli) of dry and wet land to meet its daily expenses – revealing the temple's role in providing various services to the local community by 900—1000 CE. The fertile Koddiyapuram area of Trincomalee district paid one hundred avanams of rice to the shrine and was tasked with growing oil seed for Koneswaram annually.

=== Tenth-twelfth century Chola empire ===
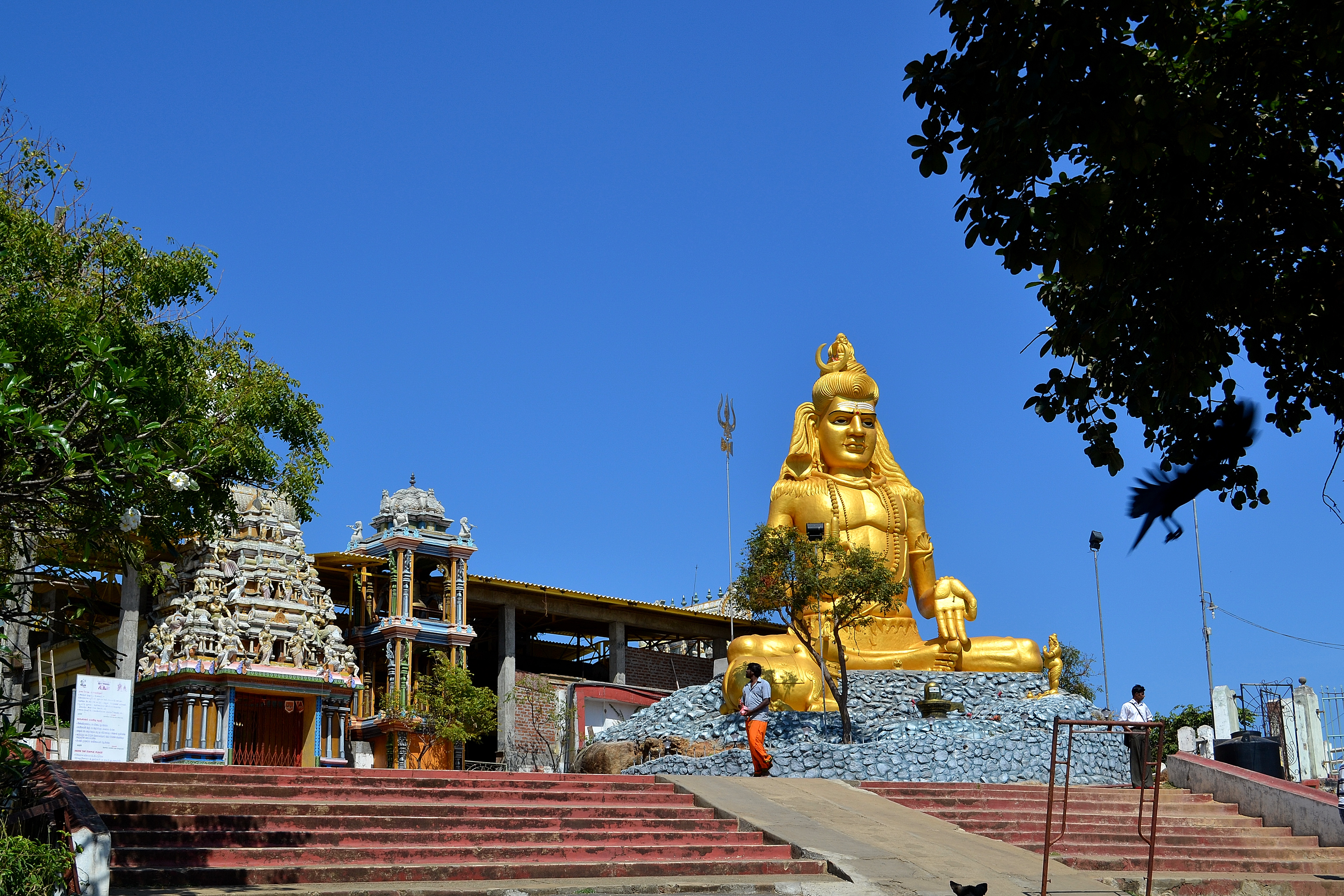
Golden statue of Shiva in front of partially restored Koneswaram temple where the inscriptional poem praising Raja Raja Chola I was found

Trincomalee figured prominently during the medieval golden age of the Tamil Chola Dynasty, due to the proximity of the Trincomalee bay harbour with the rest of the continent and its benefits for the Chola's maritime empire and the two powerful merchant guilds of the time – the Manigramam and the Five Hundred Lords of Ayyavolu in their trade with the Far East and conquest of Srivijaya of the Malay Archipelago. The Koneswaram temple compounds and its adjacent region, from Periyakulam and Manankerni in the north, Kantalai and Pothankadu in the west, and Verugal in the south, formed a great Saiva Tamil principality. Residents in this collective community were allotted services, which they had to perform at the Koneswaram temple. An inscriptional record containing a praiseful poem of Raja Raja Chola I, who ruled the northern Malabar country from 993 to 1014 CE was discovered in the 1970s within the premises of the Koneswaram temple. The 1033–1047 CE Tamil inscriptions of the nearby Choleeswaram temple ruins of Peraru, Kantalai and the Manankerni inscriptions reveal the administrative practices of the Chola King Ilankeshvarar Devar (Sri Cankavanamar) with the Koneswaram shrine and the Trincomalee region at the time. Construction activities at the temple were aided by architect and Chola dignitary Muventavelan Kanavati. The Palamottai inscription from the Trincomalee district, found amongst the inscriptions in nearby Kantalai, records a monetary endowment to the "Siva temple of Then Kailasam (Kailash of the South)" by a Tamil widow for the merit of her husband. This was administered by a member of the Tamil military caste – the Velaikkarar, troops deployed to protect shrines in the state that were closely associated to King Ilankeshvarar Devar. King Gajabahu II who ruled Polonnaruwa from 1131 to 1153 CE is described in the Konesar Kalvettu as a devout worshipper of Shiva and a benefactor of the temple of Konamamalai. King Chodaganga Deva of Eastern Ganga dynasty of Kalinga made rich donations after visiting Konamamalai on Tamil New Years Day 1223 CE, according to a Sanskrit inscription in Grantha script excavated on a doorjamb at the Hindu temple. A millennium-old Tamil inscription of the Chola Vatteluttu alphabet was discovered in October 2010 when digging for construction on an esplanade on the right side of Konesar Road leading to the shrine.

=== Pandyan kingdom, thirteenth century ===
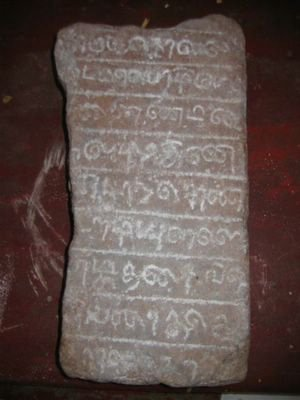
Pandyan era Koneswaram inscription

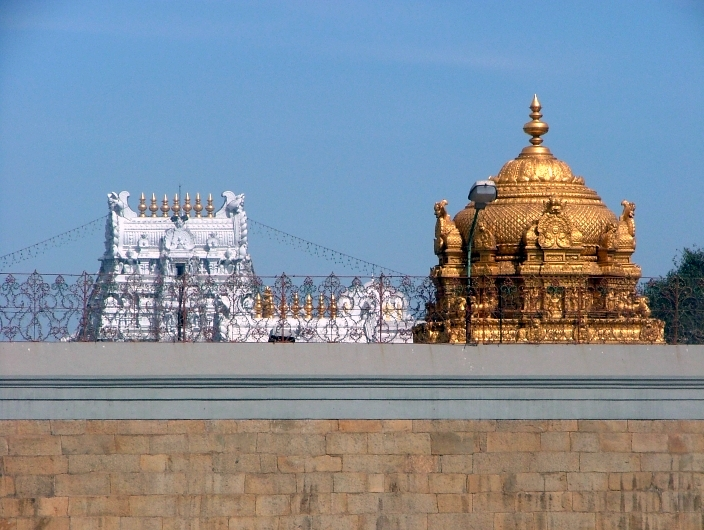
The Ananda Nilayam gopuram tower of the vimanam, the inner and outer gopurams of the Tirumala Venkateswara Temple, Tirupati, with Jatavarman Sundara Pandyan's Kalasam visible. Sundara Pandyan gold plated the gopurams and placed the kalasam atop the towers of both Tirumala Venkateswaram and Thirukonamamalai Koneswaram Kovils. Compared in the sixteenth century, Tirumala is now the richest and most visited place of worship in the world.

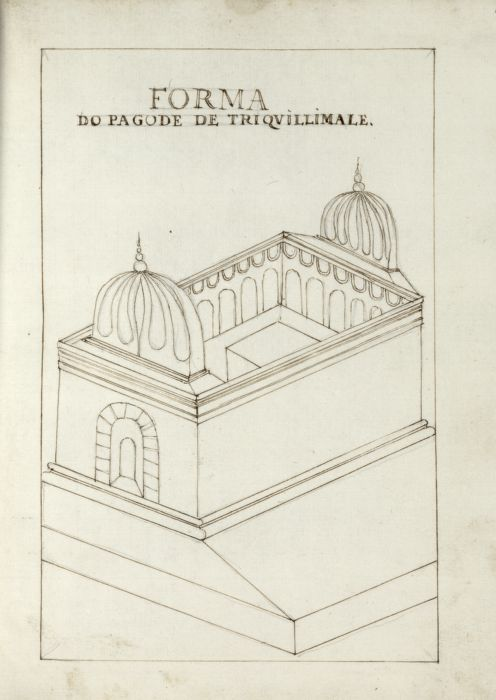
Drawing of a shrine/vimanam of the original Koneswaram Kovil Compounds of Trincomalee by Constantine de Sa de Noronha, who destroyed all three Koneswaram temple monuments on Swami Rock from 1622 to 1624. Published in 1687 dated The temporal and spiritual conquest of Ceylon by Fernão de Queyroz

Involvement of the medieval Pandyan Dynasty in the affairs of the Tamil country became stronger after the conquest of Pandyan king Srimara Srivallabha from 815 to 862, a strongly welcomed intervention by the local Tamils on the island. While under Pandyan suzerainty in 1262 CE, Prince Jatavarman Veera Pandyan I, brother and lieutenant of King Jatavarman Sundara Pandyan I repeated his brother's 1258 conquest of the island to intervene and decisively defeat Chandrabhanu of Tambralinga, a usurper of the northern Tamil throne; he proceeded to implant the Pandyan bull flag of victory and insignia of a "Double Fish" emblem at Konamalai while he subjugated the other king of the island. Historically, the Pandyans were known to have sculpted two fishes facing each other on the ceilings of their multi-storey temple gopurams once they were completed (and left it with one fish in case it was incomplete). Sundara Pandyan had renovated the gopurams by gold plating the roofs and installing gold gilded Kalasam atop them, a work of art displaying affinity to Dravidian architecture. Swami Rock at this time is described as "Kona ma-malai, around which the ocean waves swept pearls, gold, precious stones, and shells from the depth of the ocean and heaped them along the shore." Local residents contributed to the wealth of the temple under the Pandyan's rule of the north of the island. The 13th century Tamil stone inscription in Kankuveli village records the assignment by Vanniar chiefs Malaiyil Vanniyanar and Eluril Atappar of income and other contributions from the rice fields and meadows of the Vannimai districts of the ascending Jaffna kingdom to the Koneswaram shrine.

=== Jaffna kingdom (1215–1620 CE) ===
The Tamil Aryacakravarti dynasty kings of the Jaffna kingdom paid homage to the Koneswaram shrine under its sovereignty, offering gifts of gold and silver. Among the visitors were King Singai Pararasasegaram and his successor King Cankili I. King Jeyaveera Cinkaiariyan (1380—1410 CE) had the traditional history of the temple compiled as a chronicle in verse, entitled Dakshina Kailasa Puranam, known today as the Sthala Puranam of Koneswaram Temple. The literature describes how from the middle of Sivanoli Padam Malai, three rivers or "kankai" (Ganges) were generated to rise out of Shiva's foot print – Mavillie-Kankai flowing towards the North, reaches Shiva's abode at Trincomalee, and falls into the sea south of it. Manikka-Kankai flows towards the East and passes by the temple of Kadirkamam, dedicated to Muruga, son of Shiva, and then falls into the eastern sea. Kavary-Kankai flows towards the West, and passes into the place of Shiva called Thiruketheecharam at Manthottam in Mannar. These three rivers are described as "highly meritorious streams". He shipped stone blocks from Trincomalee to the temple of Rameswaram to renovate its sanctum sanctorum. Jeyaveera Cinkaiariyan's successor Gunaveera Cinkaiariyan (Pararacacekaran V), a trustee at Rameswaram who also oversaw structural development of that temple and the promotion of Saivite belief, donated part of his revenue to Koneswaram. The powerful Jaffna emperor Martanda Cinkaiariyan (Pararasasekaram III) took the Moroccan traveller Ibn Battuta to Sivanoli Padam Malai in 1344 CE along with four yogis who were in the habit of visiting the foot-mark on the mountain peak annually; and with these men they were also accompanied by four Brahmanas and ten of the king's companions. In 1468 CE Saint Arunagirinathar Swamikal paid homage at Koneswaram during his pilgrimage from Jaffna's Nallur Kandaswamy temple to Kadirkamam. At Koneswaram, he offered a garland of Thiruppugazh verses in praise of the Sthalam. The population, he stated, at Koneswaram, where the deep ocean rolled its furious waves, was vast, the temple well organised and the priests well versed in the Four Vedas. The shrine of Muruga, adoring son of Konesar and his consort, was near one of the gopuram entrances of the complex.

A rich collection of local texts written since the fourteenth century record the traditions pertaining to the shrine, including Konamamalai temple's use of the alternate name "Maccakeswaram". A temple of a thousand columns, during this medieval period, Koneswaram attracted pilgrims from around the Coylot Wanees Country and across Asia, culminating in it becoming the richest and most visited place of worship in the world of any faith. The last rites during the funeral of King Bhuvanekabahu VII of Kotte, a Hindu monarch who signed all of his official proclamations in Tamil were conducted at Koneswaram in 1551. His closest religious official and most trusted ambassador was of Hindu faith. Historian Diogo do Couto described the Pagode of Triquinimale as a principle temple of its kingdom while Portuguese Catholic priest and author Fernão de Quieroz described it as the "Rome of the Hindus of the Orient more frequented by pilgrims than Rameshwaram, Tirumalai-Tirupati, Kilvelur, Kanchipuram, Jagannath in Odisha or Vaijayanti in Bengal." Furthermore, he described the splendor of the famous temple of Tenavarai at its zenith as similar in its greatness on the island to Koneswaram and how idolatrous navigators would descry Koneswaram from the sea. In a 1613 written letter by Jesuit fray Manuel Barradas, Koneswaram is described as a "... massive structure, a singular work of art. It is of great height, constructed with wonderful skill in blackish granite, on a rock projecting into the sea, and occupies a large space on the summit." King Ethirimana Cinkam had resisted a call by D. Hieronymo de Azevedo the previous year to aid the latter in building a fortress in Trincomalee. The enterprise was abandoned. With the defeat of King Cankili II, all of the territory of the kingdom of Jaffna, comprising Trincomalee and Batticaloa, was assigned to the "spiritual cures of the Franciscans." This decision was taken by the bishop of Cochin, fray Dom Sebastião de S. Pedro. By the end of 1619, a small Danish fleet had arrived at Trincomalee; in May 1620, the Danes occupied Koneswaram temple and began works for the fortification of the peninsula before being defeated.

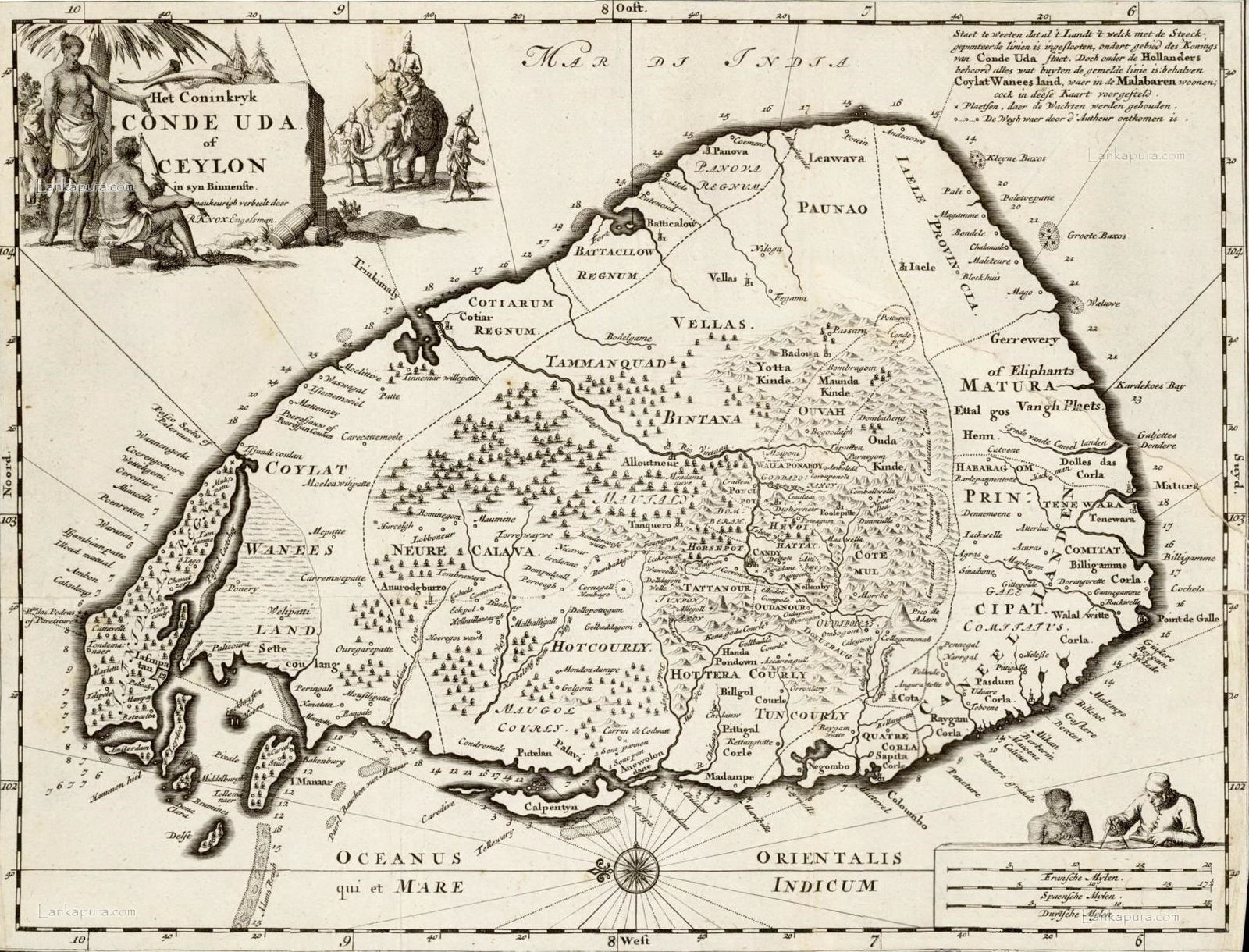
1692 engraving by Wilhem Broedelet of Robert Knox's 1681 map with Trincomalee on the east coast of Malabar country

=== Seventeenth-century destruction ===
The shrine was attacked and destroyed on 14 April 1622, the Tamil New Years Day, by the Portuguese general Constantino de Sá de Noronha (who called it the Temple of a Thousand Pillars). Eleven brass lamps had been lit in the shrine and the main statues were taken out to town during the ther procession in the festive period, during which time Portuguese soldiers entered the temple dressed as Iyer priests and began robbing it. In an act of religious zeal, the temple was then levered over the edge into the sea. Fleeing priests buried some of the temple's statues in the surrounding area, and all remaining priests, pilgrims and employees were massacred. The final monument of the temple complex was destroyed two years later in 1624. Temple stones and its carved pillars were used to construct Fort Fredrick to strengthen the colonists' influence over the eastern seaboard of the island against other invading European armies, including the Dutch navy during the Dutch–Portuguese Wars. A new church and village were built in and around the fort. An extensive campaign of destruction of five hundred Hindu shrines, the Saraswathi Mahal Library and forced conversion in the Tamil country was conducted by the Portuguese upon their arrival to the island and conquest of the Jaffna kingdom; the temple had been paying protection fees of 1280 fanams a year to the Portuguese. Trincomalee witnessed several naval battles of Europe's Thirty Years' War under Phillip II's man Filipe de Oliveira. Between 1639 and 1689 CE, the Ati Konanayakar temple was built in nearby Thampalakamam to house the idols on procession that survived. The destruction of the Konesar temple is historically viewed as the biggest loot of one of the richest temples of Asia. Gold, pearls, precious stones and silks collected for more than a millennium were robbed within a few hours. A site plan by De Quieroz states: "On the first rise to the summit of the rock was a Pagoda, another at mid-ascent – the principal one of them all at the highest eminence, visited by a concourse of Hindus from the whole of India." He describes three temples of the compound on the promontory, stating that pilgrims leaped from the last temple into the ocean in sacrifice to their idols. In his dispatch to Philip III, King of Portugal, Constantine described: "The land of the Pagoda is 600 fathoms long and 80 feet at its broadest, narrowing to 30 feet." Regarding a prophetic Tamil inscription de Noronha found at the site, he added "When I went there to make this Fort, I found engraved on the Pagoda, among many other inscriptions, one that ran thus: Kulakottan has built this pagoda..."

=== Swami Rock (18th - 20th centuries) ===
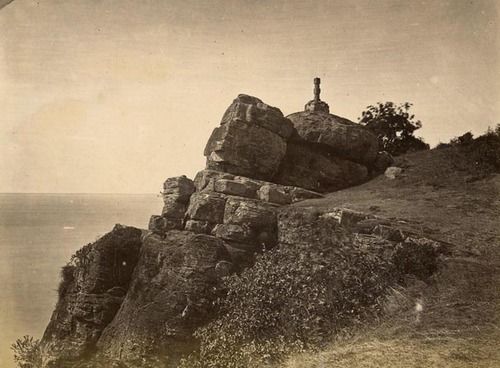
The first photograph of Swami rock and ruins of Koneswaram in 1870, prior to the reconstruction of the temple. Local residents offered services to a pillar from the original mandapam in memory of the destroyed temple

Under Dutch Ceylon, most of Trincomalee town was administered under Jaffna-dependent Vanniars again, while the fort was occupied by the Dutch on what they called "Pagoda Hill". Batticaloa district remained dependent to Trincomalee's fort until 1782. No ceremonies were permitted to take place on Swami Rock until British rule of the island, when pilgrims were permitted to return and worship Shiva at the fortressed sacred site. By the mid-19th century, sailors, the high priest and other pilgrims visited the rock, broke a coconut and said prayers, performing sacred rites every January. Fruits and other offerings were often cast over the edge of the cliff, falling to the ruins below. The first photograph of the shrine's remains and its promontory was taken in 1870. Literature on the shrine began to be written as the site began to regain popularity among pilgrims. Thirukonasala Puranam was written during the 19th century by Tamil scholar Masilamanipillai Muttucumaru on the temple and the Thirukonasala Vaipavam on Koneswaram was written by V. Akilesapillai in 1889, published sixty years later in 1952.

=== Idol recovery, ruins and 20th-century reconstruction ===
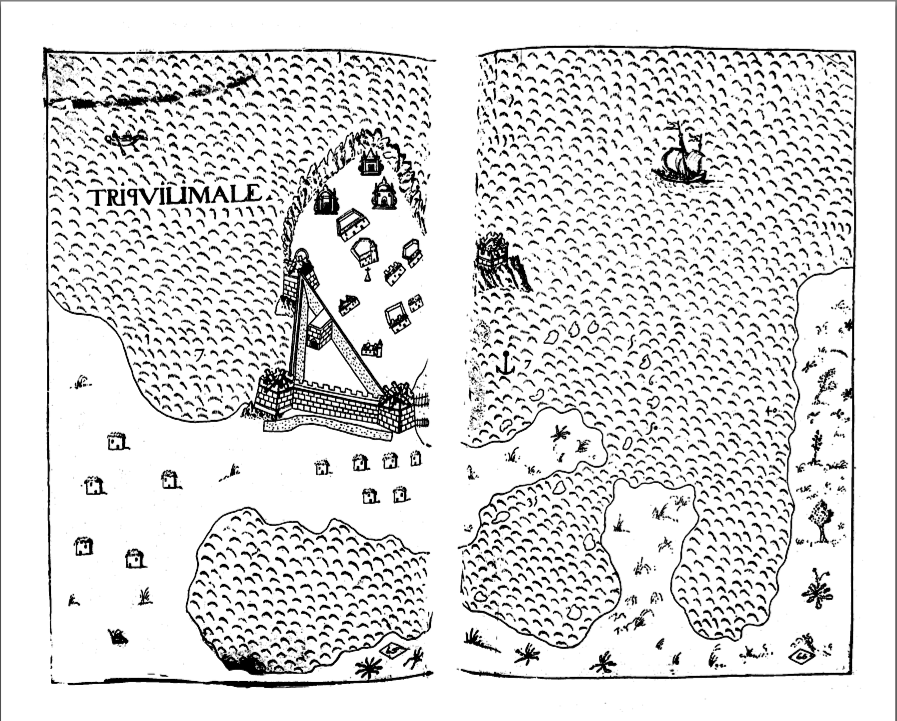
Antonio Bocarro draws Koneswaram temple monuments at the end of the promontory in 1635. The compound had been largely destroyed a decade earlier to build the large fort depicted.

In 1950, the Urban Council of Trincomalee recovered a number of the original shrine's statues buried five hundred yards from the Koneswaram site. The discovery occurred during digging for a water well. The statues are of gold and copper alloy bronze and are believed to be from the tenth century CE. They depict a seated figure of Shiva (in the form of Somaskanda), Shiva as Chandrasekhar, his consort goddess Parvati, the goddess Mathumai Ambal and Ganesha. They were taken in procession around the region before being reinstalled at Koneswaram.

Other Koneswaram statues that survived remain at the Ati Konanayakar temple. A pillar from the original temple stands under a decorated Vilvam (Aegle marmelos) tree on Swami Rock.

In 1956, while scuba diving, photographer Mike Wilson and author Arthur C. Clarke discovered ruins from the sunken original temple spread on the shallow surrounding sea-bed. Relics found by Wilson and Clarke included masonry, architecture, idol images, carved columns with flower insignias, and stones in the form of elephant heads. These ruins, as well as the pillar on Swami Rock, display Tamil, Pallava, and Chola architectural influence of the 3rd–9th century era. Corroborated by the discovery of Pallava Grantha and Chola script inscriptions and Hindu images found in the premises, this suggests that the dynasties took a keen interest in the temple.

Wilson and Clarke also retrieved the legendary Swayambhu lingam from the ocean floor. According to legend, this large natural stone obelisk was one of 69 naturally occurring lingams from time immemorial originally found on Mount Kailash of Tibet and housed in Koneswaram by King Raavan – his most sacred power object from mythological times. This lingam was reinstalled at the Koneswaram site.

Publishing their findings in the 1957 book The Reefs of Taprobane, Clarke expresses admiration for Swami rock's three thousand year veneration by Hindus. Identifying at least three Hindu temples as having been built on and around Swami rock, Clarke describes the tenth-century CE Koneswaram idols as "among the finest examples of Hindu bronze sculpture known to exist", the seated Shiva Chola bronze "a masterpiece" and the battered stone work at the foot of Swami Rock as "probably the most photographed underwater ruins in the world." 350 years after its destruction, Sri Lankan Tamil Hindu people of Trincomalee organised the temple restoration committee to restore the temple; the old images were reinstalled amid opening ceremonies in the newly restored shrine on 3 March 1963.

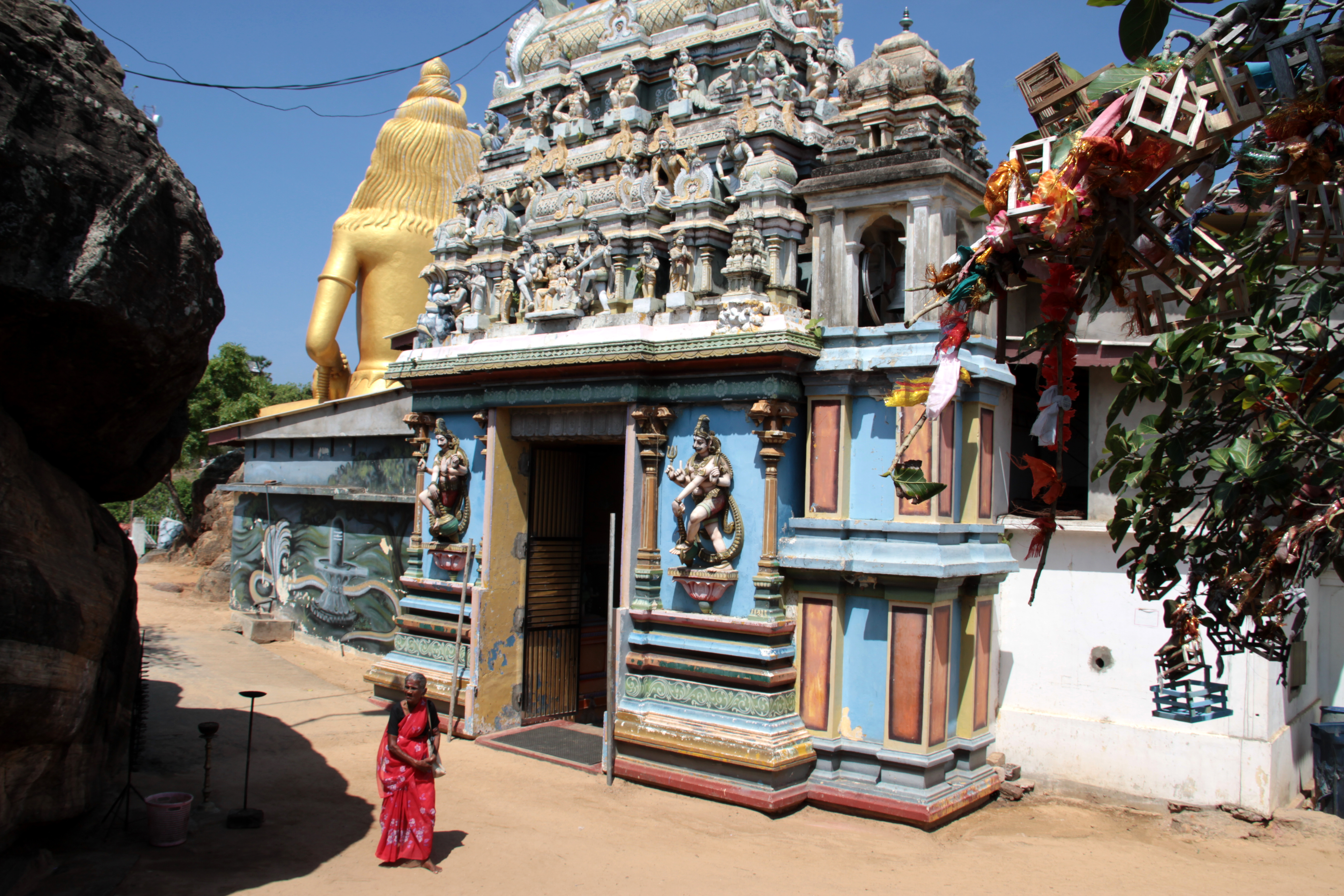
Side entrance to the temple

Some of the artefacts from the demolished temple, including De Sa de Noronha's translation of the prophecy sent to Portugal, are kept in the Ajuda Library of Lisbon (Bibliotheca da Ajuda), along with a painting and map of the original shrine. The chronicler António Bocarro shows three monuments of the Trincomalee Koneswaram Temple Compounds on the extremity of the peninsula in his map of the Livro das plantas das fortalezas cidades e povoaçois do Estado da India Oriental document of 1635, but these temples are missing from the copy of the document stored at the Paço Ducal di Vila Viçosa library in Lisbon. The stone inscription discovered by the temple's destroyer has a Double-Fish insignia and its engraved prophecy, translated from ancient Tamil script, warns of the "coming of the Franks" after the 16th century. The prediction reads "O King! The franks shall later break down the holy edifice built by Kulakoddan in ancient times; and no future kings of this island will rebuild it! Following the successive reigns of the cat eyed, the red eyed and the smoke eyed nations it will voluntarily revert to the Tamils." Pandyan king Jatavarman Veera Pandyan's insignia of the old Koneswaram temple and a portion of the prophetic inscription are seen today at the door entrance to Fort Fredrick.

== Location and layout ==
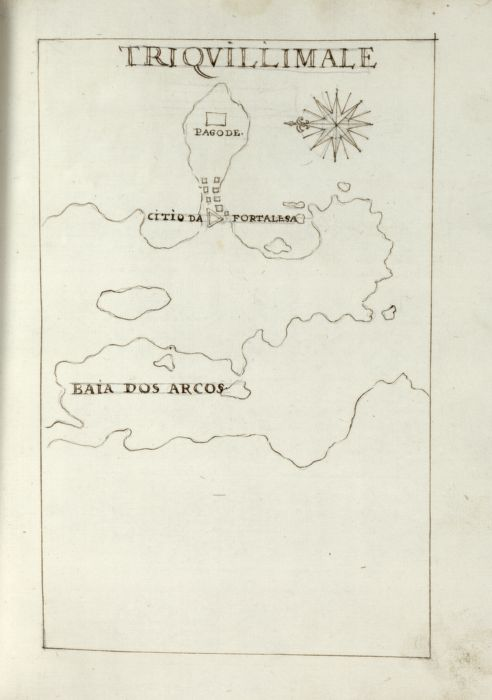
Location of one of the three Koneswaram temple monuments as Trincomalee was beginning to be fortified by European colonials in 1620. The fort visible is where a colossal monument of the Konesar temple stood on Konesar Malai (Swami Rock) before destruction in 1622; the final Pagoda monument was destroyed in 1624. Portuguese drawing/sketch published c. 1650.

=== Trincomalee Koneswaram temple compounds ===
The shrine was known to Europeans as the Pagoda of Trincomalee – Temple of a Thousand Columns. The main shrine was built upon the jagati while its thousand pillared hall was the Aayiram Kaal Mandapam – a distinctly thousand pillared platform close to the vimana of the koil that forms a distinct part of the site plan of classical Dravidian temple architecture. Ruins of this feature at Koneswaram indicate that the hall was a structural addition erected by Pallava artisans, dated between 537 and 668. It formed one of the nine prakara or major courtyard compounds of the Koneswaram complex. Two other temples were prominent compound monuments on the promontory, containing prolific gopura structures over the shrines built to Vishnu-Thirumal and the goddess Ambal-Shakti. Together, they became known as the Three Pagodas of Thirukonamalai. A site plan by De Quieroz states: "On the first rise to the summit of the rock was a Pagoda, another at mid-ascent, and the principal one of them all at the highest eminence, visited by a concourse of Hindus from the whole of India." In his dispatch to Philip III, King of Portugal, Constantine described: "The land of the Pagoda is 600 fathoms long (1.2 km) and 80 feet at its broadest, narrowing to 30 feet." The complex stretches across Konesar Road off the promontory, and includes shrines to Ganesha, Murukan and Bhadrakali. Koneswaram of Konesar Malai is located 152 kilometres (94.4 mi) directly east from Kudiramalai, the ancient royal district and southern pearl-bank emporium of the Thiru Ketheeswaram temple, Mannar. Koneswaram lies on a straight diagonal path connected to Ketheeswaram and another former Jaffna temple and Paadal Petra Sthalam Ramanathaswamy Temple, Rameswaram. This pilgrimage path of 225 km (140 mi) is often traversed by foot according to Hindu custom. The complex also lies on exactly the same longitude as Mount Kailash.

=== Deities of the complex ===
In line with custom of Tamil Hindu temple compounds, the complex houses shrines to several deities. Koneswaram is the easternmost shrine of the 5 ancient Iswarams of Shiva on the island, the others being Naguleswaram (Keerimalai), Thiruketheeswaram (Mannar), Munneswaram (Chilaw) and Tenavaram (Tevan Thurai). Koneswaram has attracted thousands of pilgrims from across Asia, its Shiva shrine mentioned in the Ramayana and the Mahabharata written from 400 to 100 BCE describe at length its attraction to pilgrims from many countries and from 600 to 660, it has been glorified as one of 275 Shiva Sthalams, or holy Shiva dwellings on the continent in Tevaram. Swami Rock is heralded as a Shiva Upa Peetha (base) of Lanka in the Sivacharita, a Sanskrit work in praise of Shiva, and subsequent manuscripts of the Pithanirnaya (Maha Piitha Nirupana) as a general Sakta Peetha of Lanka with a temple of the compounds dedicated to the goddess Indraksi Devi and a male deity Raksasesvara – a reference to Ravana. Kullakottan reconstructed the Three Pagodas of Thirukonamalai, the other two dedicated to Vishnu-Thirumal and that of the Mother-Goddess (Tirukkamakkottam – a consort of Shiva) on the promontory over a far greater area than at present. This latter temple to the goddess – Ambal/Uma/Shakti/Shankari Devi – was one of the 18 Maha Shakta pithas, those Shakta pithas consecrated to the goddess which are mentioned in the Ashta dasa Shakta pitha stotram by the Hindu philosopher Adi Shankara (788—820). The Vishnu-Thirumal temple was likely the first temple encountered on the promontory – and is mentioned in Oud en Nieuw Oost-Indiën written in 1726 by François Valentijn. The temple closest to the sea end was likely that dedicated to the goddess, where the current reconstructed Shiva temple stands. Smaller shrines within the complex to Ganesha, Durga, Murukan, Agastya, and the Navagraha including the sun god Surya would have been customary near the main shrine in the centre to Shiva – the Murukan shrine is hailed at large in the Tiruppugal series of Arunagirinathar. The temple to Bhadrakali is located further along in the complex inland along Konesar Road, benefitted from Rajendra Chola I. The Kali temple is mentioned in the book Birds of Prey (1997) by Wilbur Smith, set in the 1660s. The Thirukonasala Mahatyam, describing the origins of the world, Lanka and Koneswaram based on puranic legends is now lost. The historical literature Mattakallappu Manmiyam (Batticaloa Manmiyam) that chronicles the history of Tamil settlement in Batticaloa, follows the Dakshina Kailasa Puranam and Dakshina Kailasa Manmiam in describing Koneswaram as one of the nine most important and sacred sites in the world for all Hindus.

=== Twentieth-century restored Koneswaram temple ===
The statue of Shiva was reconstructed in 2018.

== Festivals ==
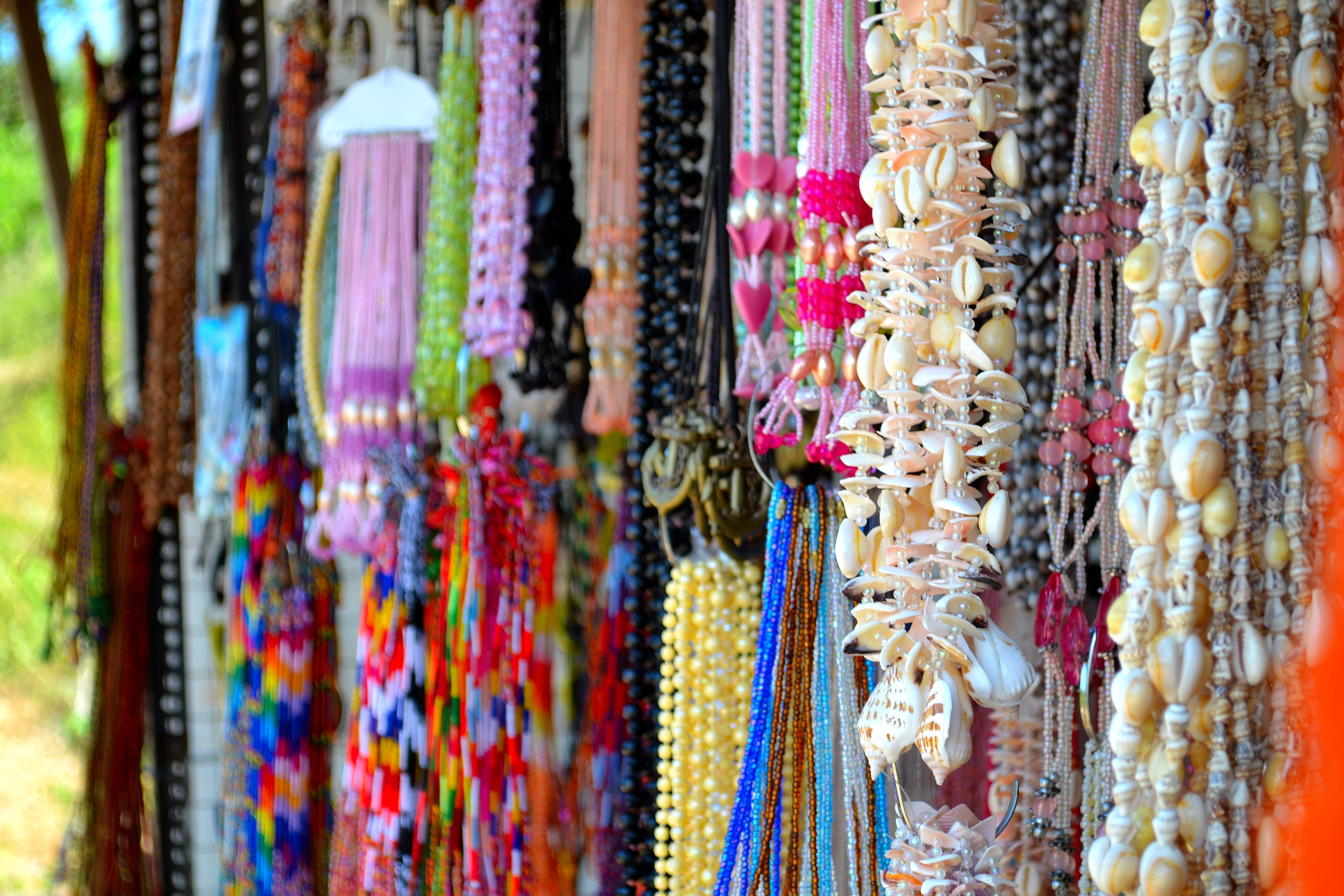
Coloured necklaces on sale at Koneswaram

The Koneswaram temple is well known for its celebration of the traditional Ther chariot festival, the Navaratri and Sivarathri functions. The Ther Chariot Festival lasts for twenty two days in April and focuses on preparing the deities and the community for Puthandu, the Tamil New Year. Navaratri lasts for nine days and is dedicated to various aspects of the presiding goddess, whereas Sivarathri is dedicated to Siva. Devotees visit the temple to attend the daily pujas and make their offerings. Booths are erected outside for the sale of food, drink, brassware, pottery, cloth and holy images. These functions primarily attract Hindus to the temple.

The main Thirukoneswaram Ther Thiruvilah Festival, the twenty-two-day annual chariot festival begins with the hoisting of the temple Nandi flag. This is followed by temple processions of Konesar and his consort Mathumai Ambal, installed and pulled in an ornate chariot temple car while deities Pillayar and Murugan with his two consorts Valli and Theivayanai are taken ahead in two other decorated chariots. This is conducted throughout Trincomalee district, and follows Kulakottan's stone scriptures detailing how Hindus in Tamil villages like Sambaltivu, lands which historically belonged to the temple, are entitled to hold poojahs as their Upayam during the annual festival period. Until April 1624 the Koneswaram Ther Festival occurred around Puthandu in April annually with five chariots and this tradition was reintroduced in April 2003, three hundred and seventy nine years later. The water-cutting Theertham Thiruvilah festival (holy bath) takes place annually in the centuries-old Papanasachunai holy well (Papanasam Theertham) on Swami Rock during the Ther festival period. The deity and other holy artefacts are bathed in the water of the well in the complex's sacred precincts. Devotees are sprayed with the holy water following the Theertham. The Theppath Thiruvilah Boat Festival consists of Konesar and goddess Mathumai Ambal taken in a boat around the temple from Swami Rock via the Back Bay Sea to the Dutch Bay Sea. Religious discourses and cultural items take place throughout the night before Puthandu at the Dutch Bay Sea beach. Thereafter the deities are taken to the temple early morning the next day on Puthandu by road through the Fort Frederick entrance. The Trincomalee Bhadrakali Amman Temple and other Hindu temples have held their water-cutting Theertham festivals in the Back Bay Sea (Theertha Kadatkarai) for several centuries. The Koneswaram Poongavanam Festival – the Temple Garden Festival is held during this twenty-two-day festival period.

An annual three-day procession follows Maha Shivaratri Day, observed every year since 1951 following the rediscovery of the bronze idols in 1950. Occurring in three stages, on each day of the festival, the images of the chief deity Konesar, the presiding consort goddess Mathumai Amman, Ganesha and Murugan are brought from Swami Rock to the entrance of Fort Fredrick in decorated Ther temple cars before being paraded through the whole Periyakadai of the Trincomalee town. The chariot cars are pulled by devotees through a decorated route while singing hymns. Devotees hold Poorna kumbham outside their houses along the route and worship as the procession moves. On the second day of the festival there is a procession to the Pathirakalai Ambal Temple where the images are kept for the evening. On the final day of the festival, the large chariots are pulled back to Koneswaram along a route through Trincomalee, accompanied by traditional Nadeswaram and Thavil musicians.

== Legends ==
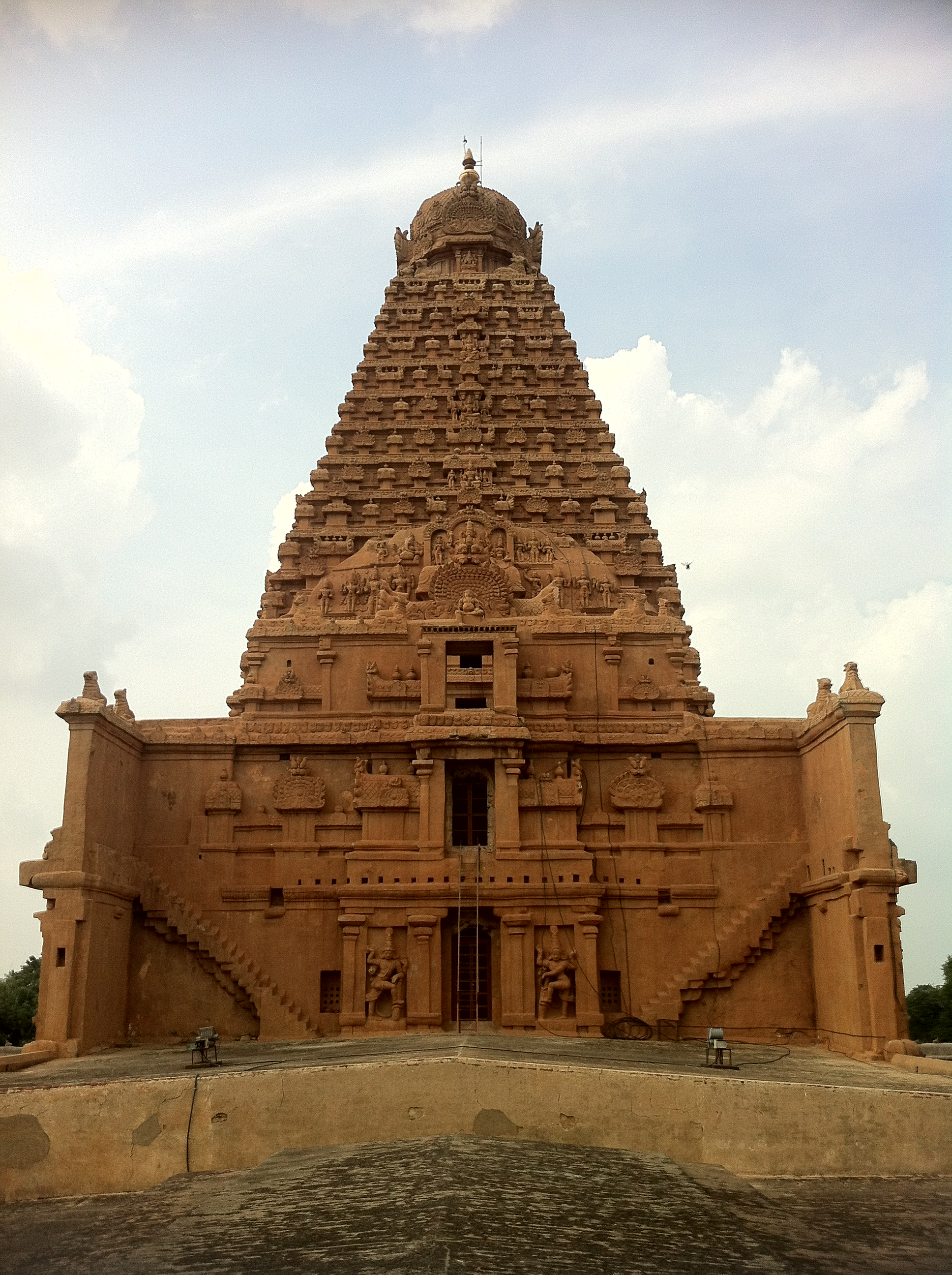
Main shrine of Brihadeeswarar Temple

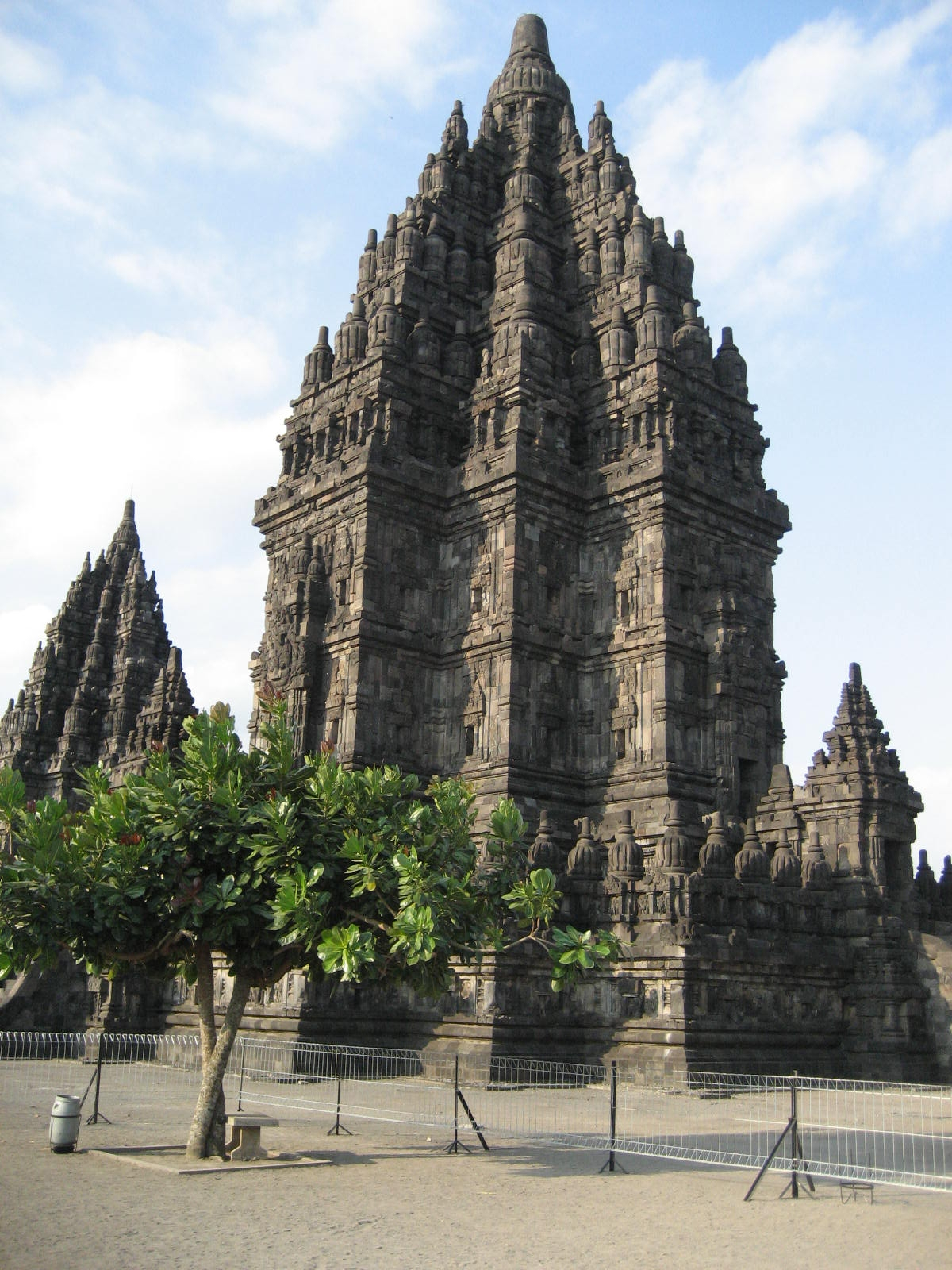
Main shrine of Prambanan temples to Shiva

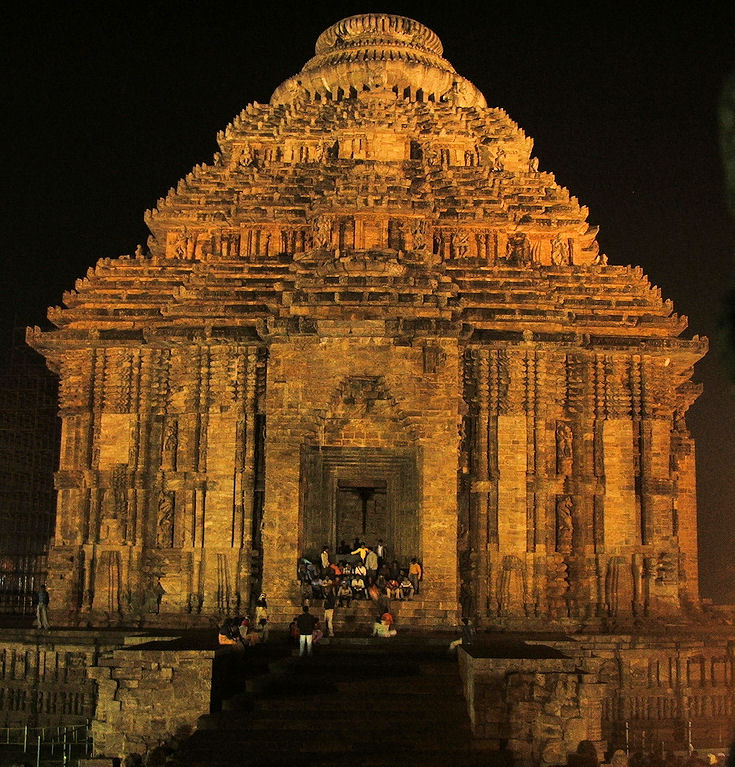
Main shrine of Konark Sun Temple

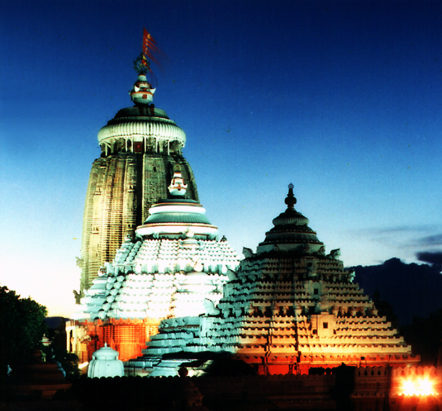
Main shrine of Jagannath Temple

The Brihadeeswarar Temple, Tanjore (left) has a vimana tower that is 216 ft (66 m) high, a classical example of Dravidian architecture that inspired the shrines of the Prambanan temple compounds, Indonesia, which contains a 154 ft (47m) high central shrine to Shiva (middle left) the Konark Sun Temple with a 229-foot tall tower (middle right) and Jagannath Temple, Puri (right). Each temple shrine on the Koneswaram promontory extremity contained tall gopuram towers by Chola rule of Trincomalee and Chidambaram's expansion that escalated the building of those syncretic latter styles of Dravidian architecture seen across the continent.

According to one Hindu legend, Shiva at Koneswaram was worshipped by Indra, king of the gods.

King Ravana of the epic Ramayana and his mother are believed to have worshiped Shiva in the sacred lingam form at Koneswaram circa 2000 BCE; the cleft of Swami Rock is attributed to Ravana's great strength. According to this tradition, his father-in-law Maya built the Ketheeswaram temple in Mannar. Ravana is believed to have brought the swayambhu lingam in the temple to Koneswaram, one of sixty-nine such lingams he carried from Mount Kailash.

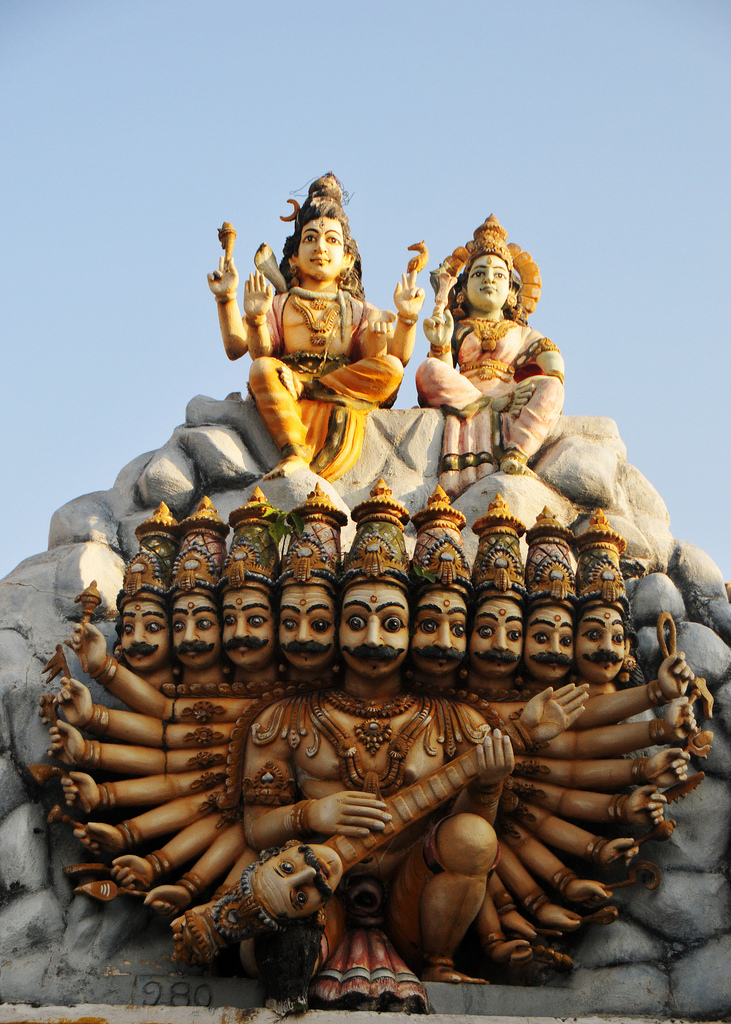
Iconography of Ravana, the mythical king of Lanka depicted on the temple walls

With the legend of the smiling infant, James Emerson Tennent describes "one of the most graceful" of the Tamil legends connected to the Temple of the Thousand Columns atop Swami Rock. An oracle had declared that over the dominions of one of the kings of the Deccan impended a great peril which could only be averted by the sacrifice of his infant daughter, who was committed to the sea on an ark of sandalwood, eventually reaching the island, south of Trincomalee at a place that in the mid 19th century was still called ’’Pālanakai’’ (smiling infant), current Panagai. After being adopted by the king of the district, she succeeded over his dominions. Meanwhile, the Hindu prince Kullakottan, having ascertained from the Puranas that the rock of Trincomalee was the holy fragment Koneiswara parwatia of the golden mountain of Meru, hurled there during a conflict between gods, arrived at Swami Rock and constructed a temple of Shiva. The princess, hearing of his arrival, initially dispatched an army to expel him, but ended up marrying the prince to end the war, and later attached vast rice fields of Thampalakamam and built the great Kantalai tank to endow the temple and irrigate the surrounding plain. Upon her death, the prince shut himself inside the pagoda of Swami rock, and was later found translated into a golden lotus on the Shiva altar.

The Dakshina Kailasa Manmiam, a chronicle on the history of the temple, notes that the Sage Agastya proceeded from Vetharaniam in South India to the Parameswara Shiva temple at Tirukarasai – now in ruins – on the bank of the Mavilli Kankai before worshipping at Koneswaram; from there he went to Maha Tuvaddapuri to worship Lord Ketheeswarar and finally settled down on the Podiya Hills.

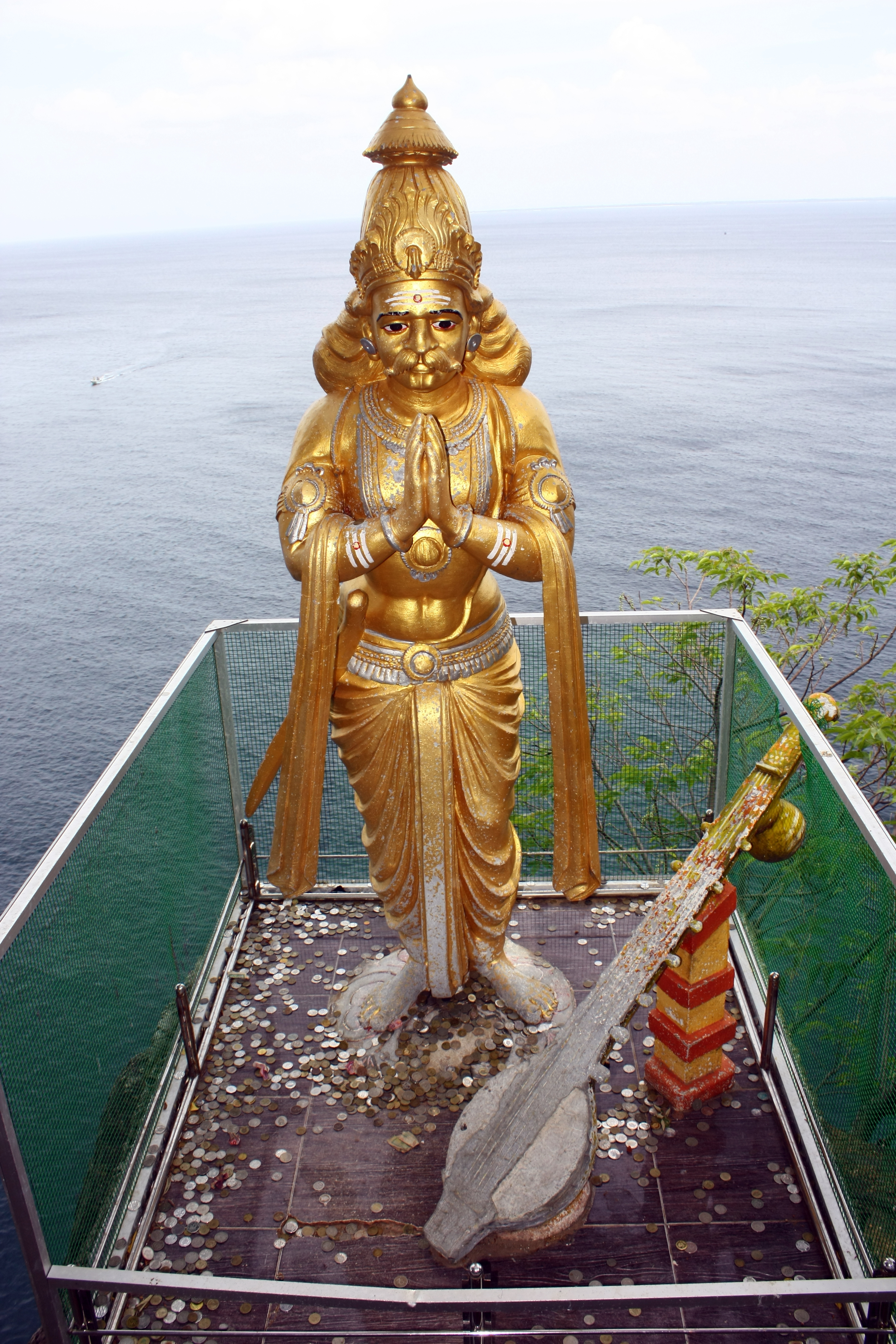
Ravana statue on East side (same side of Ravana's Cleft) of the Swami rock slope

Dutch legends connected with the Hindu pillar from the ruins on Swami Rock concern an inscription found engraved on the re-erected monument dated to 1687. The inscription reads: "Tot gedaghtenis van Fran- cina van Reede, lofr. van Mydregt, dezen A° 1687 M April opgeregt", or in English : "This has been erected on the 24th April 1687 to commemorate Francina van Reede, Lady of the Manor of Mydrecht". The Dutch Governor of Ceylon Gustaaf Willem van Imhoff mentions the pillar in his diaries of 1738, visiting "Pagoodsberg" or "Pagoda Hill" on a trip from Jaffna to Trincomalee to meet Vanniar chiefs in the region. There he notes on his visit on 31 May, the "name of Francina van Reede, daughter of the late Commissaris Generaal van Reede was found cut on a shaft, with the year 1687, which shows that she too came as far as this. Nothing else worth mentioning...". The girl's father was Hendrik van Rheede, commander of Jaffna during Dutch Ceylon, and sailed from Trincomalee to Point Pedro on 23 April 1687. Historian Jonathan Forbes writing in 1810 in his book Eleven Years in Ceylon describes the pillar as a memorial to Francina's suicide, having flung herself off the edge of the cliff into the sea having seen her lover, a young Dutch officer to whom she was betrothed, sail away to Holland. Some historians describe this story as a conflation with practices that Queyroz claimed occurred with pilgrims at the site as idol worshiping sailors venerated the site from the sea. Historical records from closer to the period indicate Francina van Reede remarried in 1694. Writers describe the intentions of the person who re-erected the old Hindu pillar and carved the inscription on it as being to commemorate Francina having climbed the crag to wave goodbye to her father as he sailed past, and a token of human affection. Ravana's Cleft is also known as Lover's Leap in reference to this legend.

Another tradition holds that during his rule in the 12th century, King Gajabahu II marched from his southern strongholds to the Konesar Kovil with the intention of demolishing it and converting it to a Buddhist temple. When nearing the Kantalai tank, he is believed to have been miraculously cured of his blindness by a Hindu, and henceforth converted to Hinduism. The tank is said to be named on this account Kandalai meaning "eye grows" in Tamil.

== Hindu and Buddhist conflicts over the temple ==
Sri Lanka has had a history of conflict between its minority Hindu Tamils and majority Sinhalese Buddhists since its political independence from Great Britain in 1948 which led to the Sri Lankan Civil War. Since the 1950s Sinhalese Buddhists have claimed that the Tirukoneswaram temple was originally exclusively a Buddhist temple. They cite and interpret historical information of three Pagodas at the Koneswaram site as alluding to Buddhist temples. Buddhists have also claimed that the site was the location of the ancient Gokanna Vihara built by King Mahasena. It was also based on an assertion made by archaeologist Senarath Paranavithana in reading a 13th-century Sanskrit donative inscription in Grantha Tamil script made by a Codaganga Deva found in the Hindu temple's premises. The inscription reads that Codaganga landed in Gokarna in 1223.

A temple dedicated to a deity in "Gokarna" city is mentioned in the Mahavamsa. It mentions that Mahasena (334–361) a Mahayanist zealot known for his temple destructions, who ruled a central kingdom of the island from the southern city of Anuradhapura destroyed temples dedicated to a deity in Gokarna and built Buddhist Viharas in its place. A twelfth-century commentary on Mahavamsa indicates that the destroyed deity temple had a lingam – a form of Shiva in it.

Other sources indicate that the complex may have had Hindu and Buddhist sections prior to its destruction. In 1968, the unity government of majority Sinhalese dominated United National Party and the minority Tamil dominated Federal Party collapsed over disagreements about declaring the holy Hindu site a protected area. A committee appointed by a Federal Party Minister to study the viability of declaring the site protected was disbanded without consultation by the Prime Minister at the time, Dudley Senanayake, after receiving a letter of complaint from a prominent Buddhist monk who objected because the temple area would "get into the hands" of those "who are neither Sinhalese or Buddhist". The Federal Party withdrew its support to the government following that action. According to journalists like T. Sabaratnam, this incident had negative repercussions towards the future co-operation between Tamil and Sinhalese communities. The temple and its environs are currently occupied by the Sri Lankan Army, which maintains a base at Fort Frederick. On 21 September 2008, the chief priest of the temple Sivashri Kugarajakurrukal was assassinated in a campaign that has targeted Hindu priests in the region.

== See also ==
- Hinduism in Sri Lanka
- Thirukonasala Vaipavam
- Kinniya

== Cited literature ==
- Indrapala, Karthigesu (2007). The evolution of an ethnic identity: The Tamils in Sri Lanka C. 300 BCE to C. 1200 CE. Colombo: Vijitha Yapa. ISBN 978-955-1266-72-1.
- Pathmanathan, Sivasubramaniam (2006). Hindu Temples of Sri Lanka. Kumaran Book House. ISBN 955-9429-91-4.
- Bastin, Rohan (December 2002), The Domain of Constant Excess: Plural Worship at the Munnesvaram Temples in Sri Lanka, Berghahn Books, ISBN 1-57181-252-0, OCLC 50028737
- Wilson, Jeyaratnam (1975). Electoral politics in an emergent state: the Ceylon general election of May 1970. Cambridge University Press. ISBN 0-521-20429-1.
- Phadnis, Urmila (1976). Religion and Politics in Sri Lanka. C Hurst & Co Publishers Ltd. ISBN 0-903983-52-4.
