= Kulakkottan =

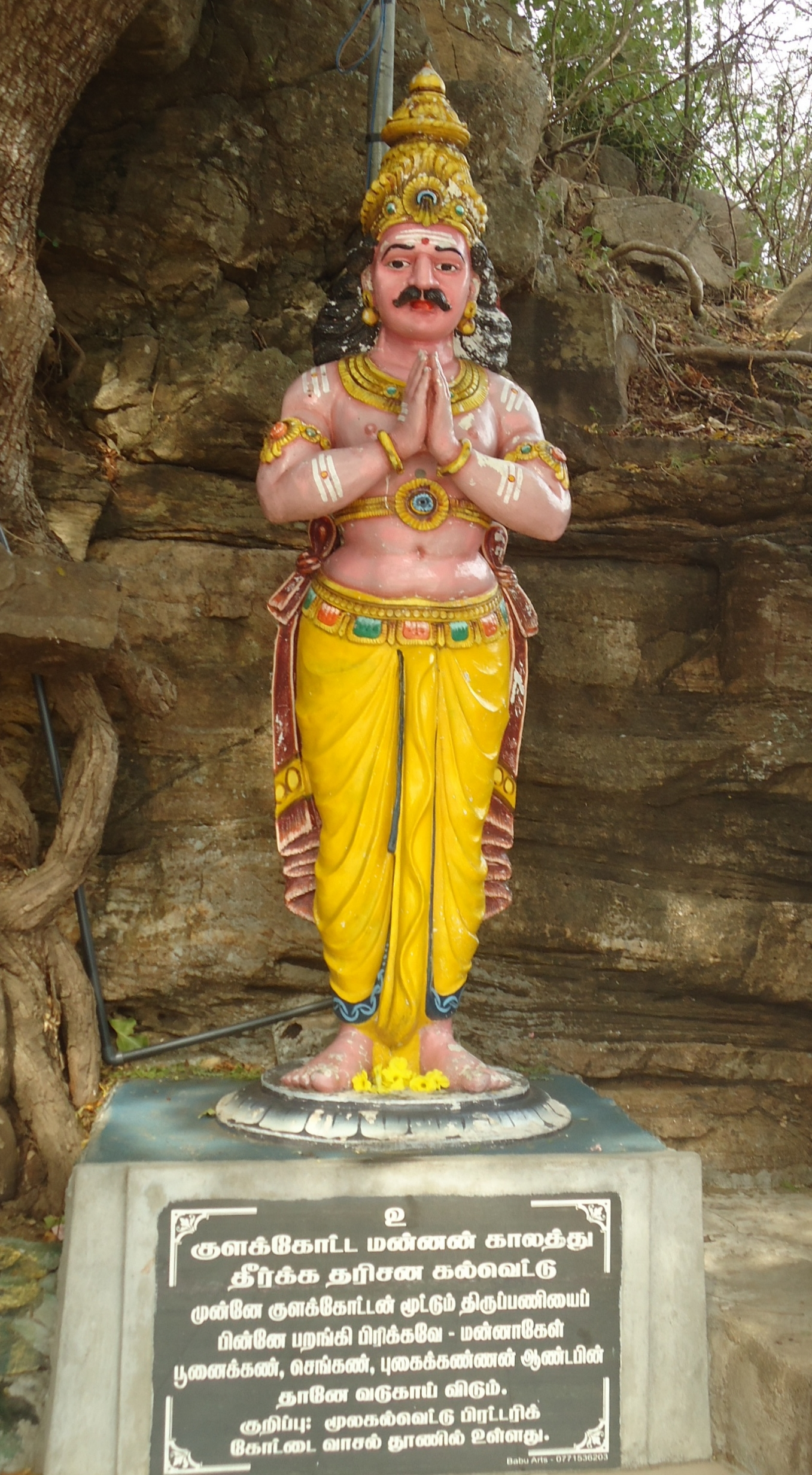
- Sculpture of Kulakkottan
- Reign: c. 5th Century CE
- Dynasty: Chola Dynasty
- Father: Vararamatevan
- Religion: Hindu

Kulakkottan (Tamil: குளக்கோட்டன்) was an early Chola king and descendant of Manu Needhi Cholan who was mentioned in chronicles such as the Yalpana Vaipava Malai and stone inscriptions like Konesar Kalvettu. His name Kulakkottan means 'builder of tank and temple'.

Kulakkottan was the son of Vararamatevan, said to have been ruler of Chola Nadu and Madurai. The historian and author, Mudaliyar Rasanayagam states that Vararamatevan and Kulakkottan arrived in Trincomalee during the reign of King Pandu of Anuradhapura. Vararamatevan found the Koneswaram temple destroyed by the Buddhist King Mahasena. He decided to restore it, a work which was later continued by his son. Kulakkottan was credited with the restoration of the ruined Koneswaram temple and for building Kantale Dam at Trincomalee in 438 CE, and the Munneswaram temple of the west coast. He is known as the royal who settled ancient Vanniyars in the east of the island of Eelam.

== See also ==
- List of Tamil monarchs
- Early Cholas
- Legendary early Chola kings
