= Yalpana Vaipava Malai =

Account of early and medieval Jaffna

The Yalpana Vaipava Malai (Tamil: யாழ்ப்பாண வைபவமாலை ; The History of the Kingdom of Jaffna) is a historical and mythical account on the early and medieval Jaffna and Ceylon island, originally written in Tamil by the poet Mayil Vaakanaar (Tamil: மயில் வாகனார்) in 1736, under the request and patronage of Jan Maccara, the then Dutch Governor of Jaffna. It was translated to English by C. Brito, and was first published in 1879. Between the 18th and 19th centuries, this work was looked upon as one of great authority among the Tamils of Jaffna. It is still looked upon as an essential and precious source on Sri Lankan history, particularly esteemed among the Jaffneses and Sri Lankan Tamil historians.

== Sources ==
The author says that he referred to the books Kailaya Malai, Vaiyai Padal and Pararajasekaran Ula for his work. It is said that these books are composed not earlier than the fourteenth century, contain folklore, legends and myths mixed with historical anecdotes. Today, except the Kailaya Malai which has been printed, and a few manuscript copies of Vaiya Padal, the other works are very rare and hardly procurable. The only known manuscript of Yalpana Vaipava Malai itself was destroyed in May 1981 during the burning of the Jaffna library. In the preface of its translation done in 1879, C. Brito mentions that several manuscript copies of the Yalpana Vaipava Malai were circulating in the Jaffna peninsula on that time (late 19th century).

== Contents ==
Yalpana Vaipava Malai is one of the rare books which contains facts about the Aryachakravartis who ruled Jaffna, north Sri Lanka. It starts with the King Vibeeshana who ruled Sri Lanka after the Rama- Ravana war according to the Hindu epic Ramayana. Then it refers the Mahawamsa and discusses the Bengali Prince Vijaya and his brother's son Panduvasan, the rulers from north India. Chronicles such as the Yalpana Vaipava Malai and stone inscriptions like Konesar Kalvettu recount that Kulakkottan, an early Chola king and descendant of Manu Needhi Cholan, who was the restorer of the ruined Koneswaram temple and tank at Trincomalee in 438, the Munneswaram temple of the west coast, and as the royal who settled ancient Vanniyars in the east of the island Eelam.

According to Yalpana Vaipava Malai the history of Jaffna starts with a blind musician called Panan or Yalpadi. He received a land called Manatri from the ruler of Sri Lanka. Manatri was renamed as Yalpanam by Panan. Then it comes with the Koolangai Chakravarti who was the ruler of Jaffna after Panan. It further elaborates upon the Formation of Nallur, arrival of Tamils, and other kings of Jaffna. During the eighth century Ugrasinghan, a prince of the dynasty of the legendary Vijaya, coming with an army from India, descended upon Sri Lanka and captured one half of the island. He established his capital first at Katiramalai, known now as Kantarodai, and then shifted it to Singhai Nagar, a town on the eastern coast of the Jaffna Peninsula. Though the story of Ugrasinghan has generally been rejected by scholars, some are of the view that this story is "based on a historical fact", namely that Ugrasinghan has been confused with Manavamma who was helped by the Pallava King Narasimhavarman I. After stating some facts about the Portuguese rule of Ceylon, the book ends with some facts of the Dutch rule.
