= Kailasanathar Temple =

Kailasanathar Temple is the name of several temples and ancient religious sites found in Southeastern India, all dedicated to the deity Shiva in its form of Kailasanathar or Kailashanatha (transl. Lord of the Kailasha). The designation refers to the Mount Kailash, which is the primary abode of Shiva.

Kailasanathar Temple may refer to:

- Kailasanathar Temple, Brahmadesam
- Kailasanathar Temple, Ezhur
- Kailasanathar Temple, Kanchipuram
- Kailasanathar Temple, Karaikal
- Kailasanathar Temple, Melakaveri
- Kailasanathar Temple, Nedungudi
- Kailasanathar Temple, Thandankorai
- Kailasanathar Temple, Tirumetrazhigai
- Kailasanathar Temple, Thingalur
- Kailasanathar Temple, Sivappalli
- Kailasanathar Temple, Srivaikuntam
- Kailasanathar Temple, Udayalur
- Kailasanathar Temple, Uthiramerur, Pallava rock-cut Shiva temple in Uthiramerur, Kanchipuram district, Tamil Nadu

== See also ==
- Kailasa Temple, Ellora, Rastrakuta-Pallava rock cut black granite megalithic Shiva temple of the Ellora Caves, near Aurangabad in Maharashtra, India
