= Pathirakali Amman Temple =

Pathirakali Amman temple
- பத்திரகாளி அம்பாள் கோயில்
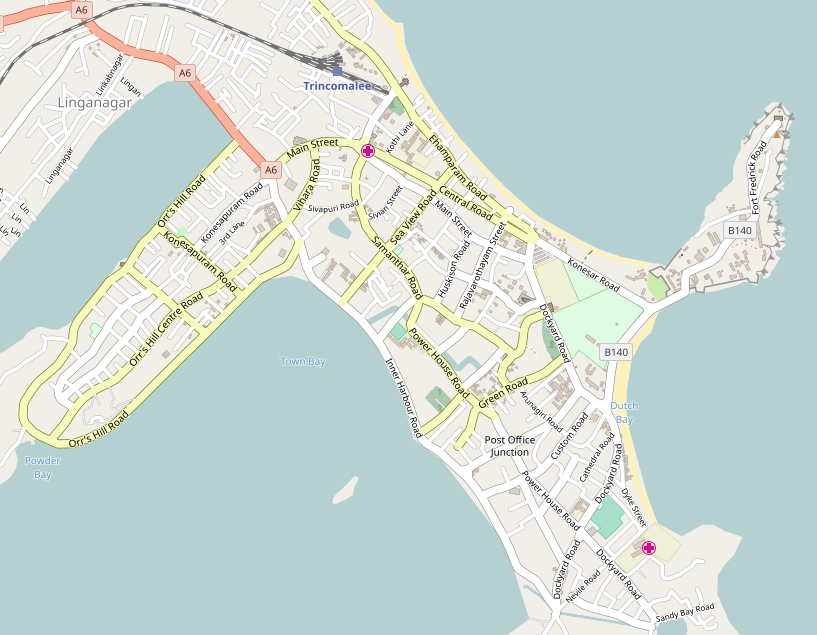
- Location in central Trincomalee

Religion
- Affiliation: Hinduism
- District: Trincomalee
- Province: Eastern Province
- Deity: Bhadrakali (Ambal/Kali)
- Festival: Koneswaram Temple Ther Thiruvilah festival

Location
- Location: Trincomalee
- Country: Sri Lanka
- Interactive map of Pathirakali Amman temple
- Coordinates: 8°34′28.28″N 81°14′2.07″E

Architecture
- Type: Tamil architecture
- Completed: Unknown; inscriptional references from 11th century and before
- Inscriptions: Rajendra Chola I

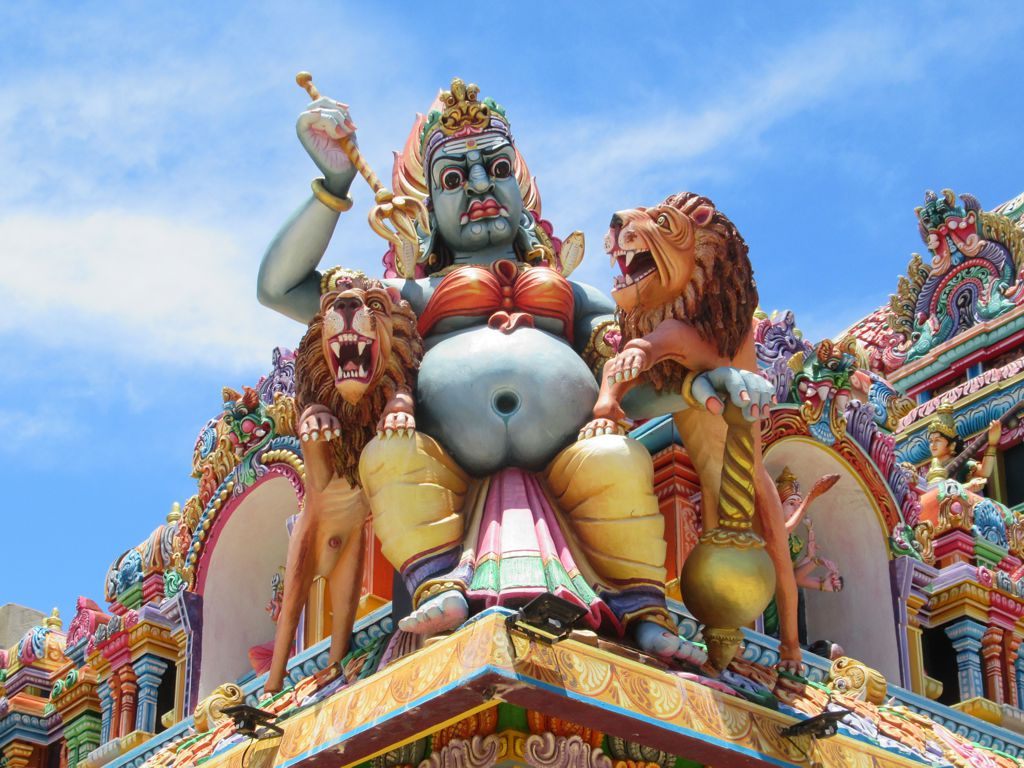
Statue at the temple of a guardian with a very similar appearance to Kali

Pathirakali Amman Temple (Tamil: பத்திரகாளி அம்பாள் கோயில்) – Pathirakali Ambal Kovil – or the Kali Kovil, Trincomalee is a Hindu temple dedicated to the goddess Bhadrakali, a form of the goddess Kali Amman in Trincomalee, Eastern Province, Sri Lanka. The Kali temple of the ancient Trincomalee Koneswaram Temple Compounds, a large complex of connected shrines in the Trincomalee Konesar Malai area, the temple is located close to the Trincomalee Hindu College.

Made in classical Tamil architecture, the Kovil is located just beyond the Konesar Road Esplanade before the entrance to Konamamalai (Swami Rock). Proximal to the ancient Koneswaram temple, both ancient temples share functions during Ther Thiruvillah Festival procession and the Back Bay Sea (Theertham Karatkarai).

Pathirakali Amman temple has attracted pilgrims from before the 11th century CE. King Rajendra Chola I expanded the shrine significantly during his reign, an inscription he left detailing this is displayed on the premises.

The temple is mentioned in the book Birds of Prey (1997) by Wilbur Smith, set in the 1660s.

== See also ==
- Thillai Kali Temple, Chidambaram
- Koneswaram temple, Trincomalee
