= Gokanna Vihara =

Gokanna Historic Buddhist Temple
- ගෝකන්න විහාරය
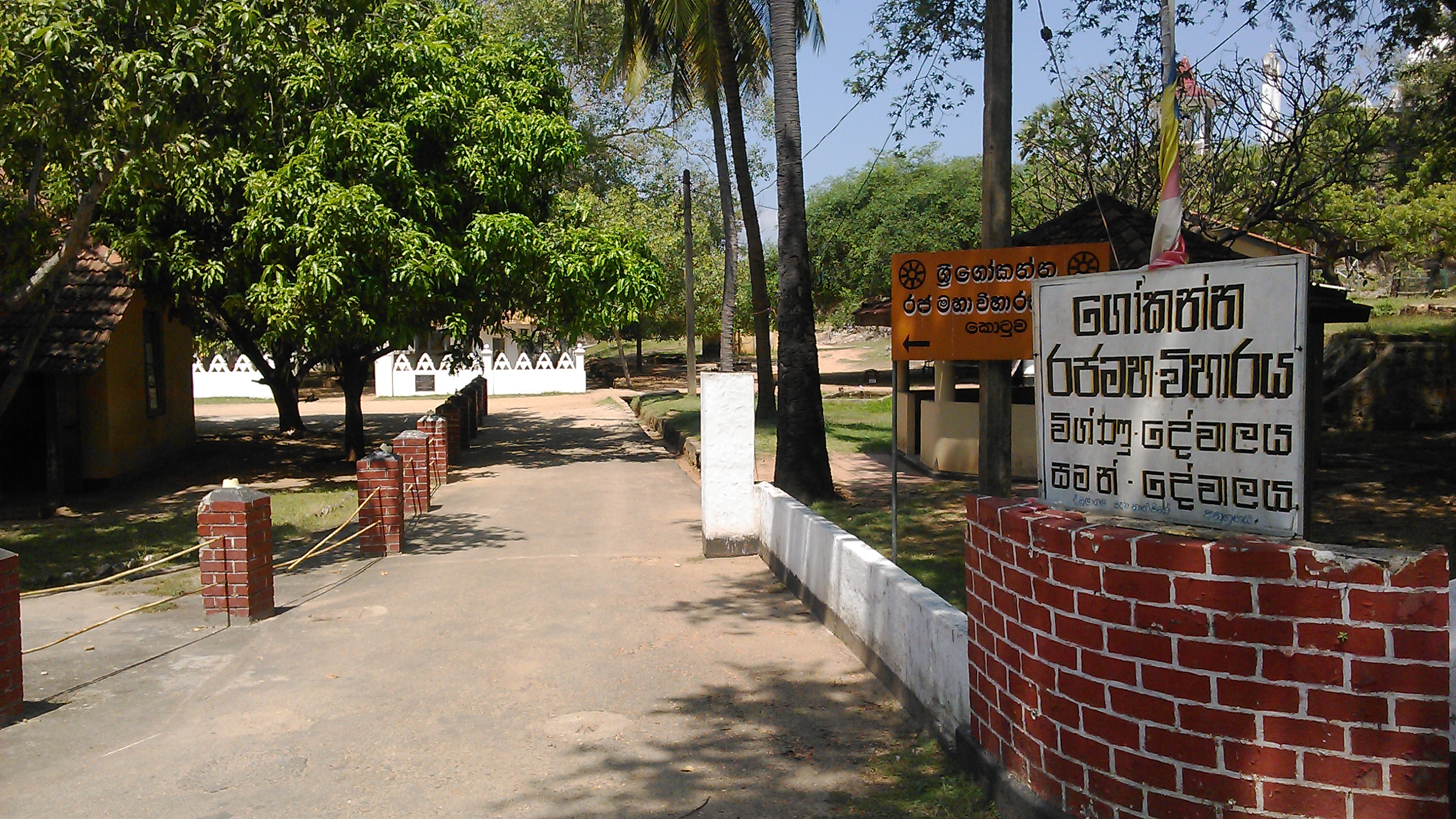
- The entrance way of the Vihara preises

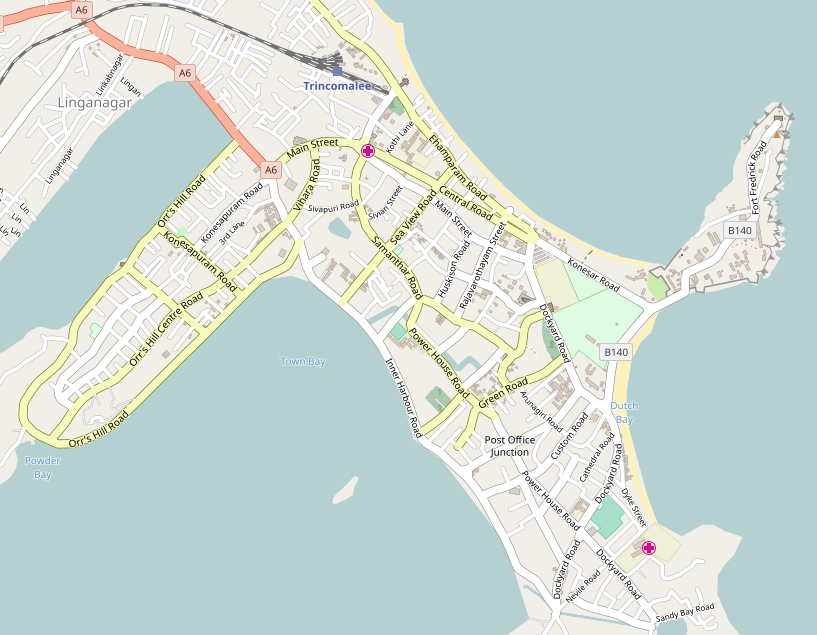
- Location within Central Trincomalee

Religion
- Affiliation: Buddhism
- District: Trincomalee
- Province: Eastern Province, Sri Lanka

Location
- Location: Fort Fredrick, Trincomalee, Sri Lanka
- Coordinates: 08°34′36.4″N 81°14′29.8″E

Architecture
- Type: Buddhist Temple
- Completed: 3rd century AD
- Archaeological Protected Monument of Sri Lanka
- Official name: Remaining ruins of Ancient Gokanna Vihara

Gokanna Viharaya (Sinhala: ගෝකන්න විහාරය) was an ancient Buddhist temple located in Trincomalee in the Eastern Province of Sri Lanka. The temple lies in the premises of Fort Fredrick close to the fort entrance.

== History ==
According to the references of Sri Lanka Archaeological Department, Trincomalee had been known as Gokanna in the ancient times. The Mahavamsa chronicle recounts that the Gokanna Vihara was built by King Mahasen in the 3rd century (275–301 AD) by destroying a Shiva temple that existed on the Swami Rock, where the Koneswaram Kovil stands today. It is said that in the reign of King Agbo V, the temple was modified by adding a preaching hall.

A Tamil rock inscription which was found near the main entrance to the fort, states that the Hindu temple that existed at this place was destroyed by the Portuguese. The Hindu temple was later rebuilt in 1963.

=== Present ===
In correspondence from the Government Agent of Trincomalee, dated 8 October 1964, to the Secretary, Ministry of Cultural Affairs, it states that the Bodhi tree in front of the Koneswaram Kovil had been destroyed. Recently divers have discovered submerged Buddhist and Hindu sculptures in a nearby sea area and brought them ashore.
