= Kailasanathar Temple, Udayalur =

Siva temple located in Udaiyalur, Tamil Nadu, India

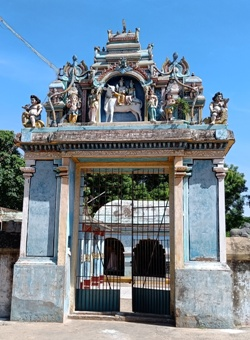
Temple entrance

Kailasanathar Temple, is a Siva temple in Udaiyalur at Kumbakonam takuk in Thanjavur District in Tamil Nadu (India).

== Presiding deity ==
The presiding deity is known as Kailasanathar. His consort is known as Sankaraparvathi Ambal.

== Speciality ==
From the inscriptions of Kulottunga I, Vikrama Chola, Rajaraja II, Rajathiraja II, Kulothunga Chola III, Rajaraja III and Sadayavarman Sundarapandian it is learnt that this temple was patronised by them. A sculpture of a devotee is found under the feet of Dvarapala found at the entrance of sanctum sanctorum. There is also another sculpture of a devotee in worshipping pose. In no other temple such sculptures are found. Palkulatti Amman Temple and Selvamaha Kalliamman Temple are the temples of village Amman deities of this place.

== Structure ==
This temple has sanctum sanctorum of presiding deity and the goddess. There are also front mandapa and prakara. Next to the entrance in the right side the sanctum sanctorum is found. In front of mandapa shrines of Bala Vinayaka in right and Subramania in left are found. In the kosta, Dakshinamurthy, Bikshadanar, Rajayoga Agasthiar, Lingodbhava, Brahma, Rishabarudar and Sulini Durga are found. In the prakara shrines of Nrithi Vinayaka, Shanmuga, Chandikesvarar, Sivabathasekara, Navagraha and Sanisvara are found, followed by the shrines of Shanmuga, Ganapathi, Durga, Gajalakshmi, Sarasvathi and so many lingas. Five Bairavas are also found in the temple in the prakara.

== Sadaya festival ==
Special pujas are done during Sadaya festival.

== Photo gallery ==
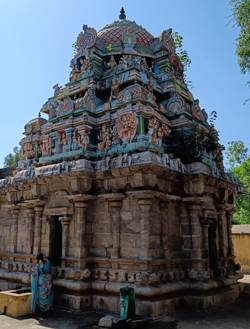
Vimana of presiding deity

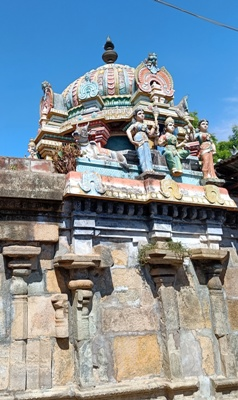
Vimana of goddess

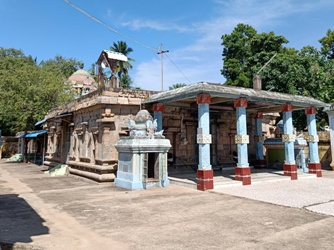
Prakara
