= V. Akilesapillai =

- Born: 7 March 1853; Trincomalee, Sri Lanka
- Died: January 1, 1910 (aged 56)
- Occupations: Writer, Scriptwriter

V. Akilesapillai (March 7, 1853 – January 1, 1910) was a Sri Lankan Tamil scholar, poet and writer.

== Biography ==
Akilesapillai was born on March 7, 1853, in the town of Trincomalee, Sri Lanka. He was a trained teacher and also served as a Head Master of a School. Besides being a Tamil scholar, he was also fluent in English language.

He had an exceptional love and dedication towards Tamil for which he quit his teaching career and devoted his life for the development of Tamil Language and Hinduism in Trincomalee.

His most famous work is Thirukonasala Vaipavam, which is a writing on the history of Koneswaram Temple at Trincomalee. This was first published in 1952 by his brother V.Alahakone and was reprinted in 2000.
