= Nedungudi =

Village in India

Coordinates: 10°11′N 78°49′E

- village
- Interactive map of Nedungudi
- Country: India
- State: Tamil Nadu
- District: Pudukkottai

Population (2001)
  - Total: 1,973

Languages
  - Official: Tamil
- Time zone: UTC+5:30 (IST)

Nedungudi is a village in the Arimalamrevenue block of Pudukkottai district, Tamil Nadu, India.

== Demographics ==
As per the 2001 census, Nedungudi had a total population of 1973 with 957 males and 1016 females. Out of the total population 1194 people were literate.
