= Udaiyalur =

Coordinates: 10°55′N 79°22′E

- village
- Interactive map of Udaiyalur
- Country: India
- State: Tamil Nadu
- District: Thanjavur
- Taluk: Kumbakonam

Population (2001)
  - Total: 2,995

Languages
  - Official: Tamil
- Time zone: UTC+5:30 (IST)

Udayalur is a village in the Kumbakonam taluk of Thanjavur district, Tamil Nadu, India. Udayalur is a few kilometers away from the historic Chola dynasty stronghold town of Kizha Pazhayarai. The village was historically called SriKangeyapuram.

== Specialities ==
The village has four temples dedicated to Hindu deities. The Selva Maha Kali Amman Temple is the most popular of the four, while the Kailasha Nathar temple dedicated to Lord Shiva has significant history and due importance. The other two temples are the Palkulatthi Amman temple and a temple dedicated to Lord Vishnu. The annual "Thiruvizha" or the "Thirunaal" is a celebrated during March-end or April-beginning as a token of gratitude to God.It is also a time of celebrations throughout the village and places surrounding it as people from across everywhere gather to the village. This is a common feature of most villages in the state of Tamil Nadu.Street plays are held, which people attend enthusiastically.

== Historical significance ==
The Kailasanathar temple in Udaiyalur village is believed to be the final resting place of the Chola dynasty emperor Raja Raja Chola I, as per Professor G Deivanayagam, an authority on Chola history and a scholar of temple architecture.

== Demographics ==
As per the 2001 census, Udayalur had a total population of 2,995, with 1,502 males and 1,493 females. The sex ratio was 994. The literacy rate was 72.29%.
