= Tamil inscriptions in Sri Lanka =

Tamil inscriptions in Sri Lanka date from the centuries BCE to the modern era. The vast majority of inscriptions date to the centuries following the 10th century AD, and were issued under the reigns of both Tamil and Sinhala rulers alike. Out of the Tamil rulers, almost all surviving inscriptions were issued under the occupying Chola dynasty, whilst one stone inscription and coins of the Jaffna Kingdom have also been found.

Most inscriptions are of a Hindu or Buddhist nature, or record the exploits of merchants, soldiers, officials and kings.

The longest Tamil inscription in the island is from the Lankatilaka Vihara, for which historian K. Indrapala states the following:

"The status of the Tamil language in the Sinhalese kingdom in the pre-colonial period would be an eye-opener to many. Where necessary, Sinhalese kings or other authorities used the Tamil language for their epigraphic records. In the fourteenth century, a record inscribed in Sinhala on the walls of the Lankatilaka Temple was provided with a full Tamil translation on the same walls, as if setting an example to future rulers of the country. This Tamil inscription, incidentally, is the longest Tamil epigraph in the island."

== Early Anurādhapura period (300 BC – 300 AD) ==
=== Anaikoddai seal, Jaffna ===
Anaikoddai seal (dated to centuries B.C.)
Background	Translation (English)	Inscription (Tamil in the Brahmi script)
A steatite seal from a signet ring found in an early Iron Age burial in Anaikoddai, Jaffna. The seal contains both Brahmi and megalithic graffiti symbols arranged in a way that suggests that they may be a translation of each other.	The legend is read as 'Ko Veta'. Ko means 'King' in Tamil and refers to a chieftain here. It is comparable to such names as Ko Ataṉ and Ko Putivira occurring in contemporary Tamil Brahmi inscriptions of ancient South India. The Trident symbol is also found after a Tamil Brahmi inscription of the Chera dynasty supporting this interpretation.	Koveta (read from right to left).

=== Tissamaharama coins with Tamil Brahmi legends ===
Tissamaharama coins with Tamil Brahmi legends
Background	Translation (English)	Inscription (Tamil in the Tamil Brahmi script)
Locally produced coins with Tamil Brahmi legends were found in the southern town of Tissamaharama. They are dated to between 200 BC - 200 AD. The coins are thought to have been issued by Tamil traders settled in Sri Lanka.	Coins ending with the Tamil Brahmi letter 𑀷 (-aṉ). Coin 1: Uttiraṉ Coin 2: Kapati Katalaṉ Coin 3: Mahācāttaṉ Coin 4: Tisapittaṉ	Coin 1: Uttiraṉ from Tissamaharama Coin 2: Kapati Katalaṉ from Tissamaharama

=== Tamil letters and words in Prakrit inscriptions ===
Tamil letters and words in Prakrit inscriptions
Background	Translation (English)	Inscription (Prakrit with Tamil letters in the Brahmi script)
The letters 𑀴, 𑀵, 𑀶 and 𑀷 are unique to Tamil Brahmi. They are found in multiple Tamil words in the earliest Prakrit inscriptions of Sri Lanka. The Veḷ name is found several times, mostly associated with the chief title Parumaka. Parumaka is the single most common lay title in the entire corpus of ancient Brahmi inscriptions, occurring over 314 times. The Tamil kinship term Marumakaṉ which means descendant is also present. The word Dameḻa (Tamil) is present in six early Prakrit inscriptions related to Buddhist donations and Tamil Buddhist monks. The 𑀟 letter (often reversed) is used here to represent an early form of the Tamil 𑀵 (ḻa).	1. Parumaka - 𑀧𑀭𑀼𑀫𑀓; Parumaka is derived from the Tamil 'Perumakaṉ' which means great man. The variant form Perumaka and the feminine form Parumakaḷ (𑀧𑀭𑀼𑀫𑀓𑀴) are also present with the unique Tamil letter ending 𑀴.: 2. Veḷ - 𑀯𑁂𑀴; 3. Marumakaṉ - 𑀫𑀭𑀼𑀫𑀓𑀷; 4. Dameḻa - 𑀤𑀫𑁂𑀟	Parumakaḷ Veḷ Marumakaṉ Dameḻa

The following Prakrit inscriptions are included for completion as they are related to Tamils:

=== Tamil house-holder inscription, Anurādhapura ===
Tamil house-holder inscription, Anurādhapura
Background	Translation (English)	Inscription (Prakrit with Tamil letters in the Brahmi script)
Prakrit inscription referring to a Tamil house-holder terrace made by a Tamil Buddhist monk (samaṇa).	The terrace of the Tamil house-holders caused to be made by the Tamil Samaṇa of Iḷabarata. The seat of Saga. The seat of Nasata. The seat of Ka . . Tissa. The seat of . . . . of Kubira Sujāta. The seat of Kārava, the mariner.	

=== Periya-Puliyankuḷam inscription 1, Vavuniya ===
Periya-Puliyankuḷam inscription 1, Vavuniya
Background	Translation (English)	Inscription (Prakrit in the Brahmi script)
Prakrit inscription recording a Buddhist donation by a Tamil merchant.	The cave of the householder Visākha, the Tamil merchant.	

=== Periya-Puliyankuḷam inscription 2, Vavuniya ===
Periya-Puliyankuḷam inscription 2, Vavuniya
Background	Translation (English)	Inscription (Prakrit in the Brahmi script)
Prakrit inscription recording a Buddhist donation by a Tamil merchant.	The work of the flight of steps is of the householder Visākha, the Tamil merchant.	

=== Kuḍuvil inscription, Amparai ===
Kuḍuvil inscription, Amparai
Background	Translation (English)	Inscription (Prakrit in the Brahmi script)
Prakrit inscription recording a Buddhist donation by a family with a Tamil wife.	The cave of the merchants who are the citizens of Dighavapi, of the sons of . . . . and of the wife Tissā, the Tamil.	

=== Seruwila inscription, Trincomalee ===
Seruwila inscription, Trincomalee
Background	Translation (English)	Inscription (Prakrit in the Brahmi script)
Prakrit inscription recording a Buddhist donation by a Tamil devotee.		

=== Talagahagoda Vihara inscription, Matale ===
Talagahagoda Vihara inscription, Matale
Background	Translation (English)	Inscription (Prakrit in the Brahmi script)
Prakrit inscription mentioning a Tamil Buddhist monk who donated a cave to the Maha Sangha.		

=== Ihalagala inscription, Anurādhapura ===
Ihalagala inscription, Anurādhapura
Background	Translation (English)	Inscription (Prakrit in the Brahmi script)
Prakrit inscription recording a Buddhist donation by a Tamil devotee.	Success ! The work on this flight of steps is of the female lay-devotee Cittā, mother of Abhaya the Tamil, a resident of Baḍahibadaka.	

== Late Anurādhapura period (8th–9th centuries AD) ==
=== Abhayagiriya Tamil Buddhist inscription, Anurādhapura ===
Abhayagiriya Tamil Buddhist inscription, Anurādhapura
Background	Translation (English)	Inscription
Fragment of a stone slab with Tamil letters inscribed on it found on the platform of the Abhayagiriya. It records an act of merit in the Abhayagiri premises: the construction of the floor or platform of a building occupying an area of 256 square feet and a token gift of money. The letters are dated to the 8th century AD.	'The Chamber of the Bodhi shrine measuring sixteen feet from the east to the west and sixteen feet from the north to the south that has been constructed and one kacu and one akkam (money).' — Translated by S. Pathmanathan,	Abhayagiriya Tamil inscription - 8th century AD.

=== Ruvanvalisaya Tamil Buddhist inscription, Anurādhapura ===
Ruvanvalisaya Tamil Buddhist inscription, Anurādhapura
Background	Translation (English)	Inscription
Three short Tamil inscriptions found in the premises of the Ruwanwelisaya, Anuradhapura. The inscriptions are found on the pedestals of Dvarapalakas (guardian images). The first inscription dates from the 8th-9th centuries AD. The second dates to the 10th century AD.	'1. The niche with a carved image of Arakkan: 2. The image of Arakkan carved on the stone; 3. The elevated ground of the lay devotees (upāsakas).'; — Translated by S. Pathmanathan,	

=== Pankuḷiya Tamil Buddhist inscription, Anurādhapura ===
Pankuḷiya Tamil Buddhist inscription, Anurādhapura
Background	Translation (English)	Inscription
A short Tamil inscription found at Pankuḷiya Vihara, Anuradhapura recording a donation. It dates to the 9th-10th century AD.	'Kecari Araci has made a provision for (giving) alms (for a person). Those who remove this provision shall suffer like a worm in burning oil in a pot.' — Translated by S. Pathmanathan,	

=== Nānkunāṭṭār Tamil Buddhist Inscription from Anurādhapura ===
Nānkunāttār Tamil Inscription from Anurādhapura
Background	Translation (English)	Inscription
A slab inscription of the Tamil merchant community called the Nānkunāṭṭār. It records an endowment to the Mākkotai Buddhist temple at Anuradhapura. Mākkotai was a prominent town in Kerala and suggests that this temple was started by Tamil Buddhists from Kerala. Dharmapalan was the incumbent monk at this temple. A Sanskrit eulogy to king Sena II of Anuradhapura (866-901 AD) ends the inscription.	'After donating a lamp for 'the Great Lord' (Buddha) and installing the images of the illustrious 'Nākanār' and 'the Lord' we made an endowment for the merit of those among the Tamils of the Nānku-nāṭu who have been lost and those who have died and also those who have become dumb or speechless (because of some calamity). The endowment will be made apportioning (specified) shares of the assets of those persons (concerned and with contributions from their relatives). In respect of those who had 'reached the opposite shore' (died?), (ceremonies) shall be conducted for three days at the temple. We of the Nānkunāṭu caused this inscription to be engraved so that four persons appointed by the Nānkunāṭṭār would in conjunction with the employees of the Mākkotaippaḷḷi (temple) continue to perform this dharma. Those who violate the provisions of this charity shall be born as crows and dogs. This endowment (dharma) made by the Tamils (of the Nānku-nāṭu) will be maintained and praised in this wide world surrounded by the ocean, during successive ages. There is at Mākkotai one Dharmapalan, a spotless ascetic, a firm adherent of the original and pristine dharma, whose flawless thoughts are full of compassion for all beings like unto the meritorious one sat under the Bodhi tree.' — Translated by S. Pathmanathan,	Nānkunāṭṭār Tamil inscription, Anuradhapura - 9th century AD

=== Two slab inscriptions from Hindu ruins, Anurādhapura ===
Two slab inscriptions from Hindu ruins, Anurādhapura
Background	Translation (English)	Inscription
Two Tamil inscriptions found among the remains of a Hindu temple in Anuradhapura recording endowments. Sri Sanghabodhi is a popular title of medieval Sinhala kings. The text is dated to the late 9th century AD.	'We, the members of great assembly (pērūrom) of Kumārakanam have received thirty gold coins (ilakkācu) from Cēkkilān Caṅkan, a Ceṭṭi (merchant), on the fifth day of the first half of the month of Mārkali in the fifth year of King Ciri Caṅkapoti Mārāyan. From now on we shall provide one sacred meal a day and burn a perpetual lamp, without causing any dimunition of the capital (invested).' 'Hail prosperity. We, the members of the assembly of the great ūr (pērūrom) of Kumārakanam have received (a deposit of) thirty ilakkācu from the Ceṭṭi merchant Cēkkilān Cennai in the seventh year of King Śrī Caṅkapoti Mārāyar. We shall make an offering of one sacred meal, daily, and burn a perpetual lamp without causing any dimunition of the capital invested.' — Translated by S. Pathmanathan,	Anuradhapura Hindu ruins slab 1 - 9th century AD Anuradhapura Hindu ruins slab 2 - 9th century AD

== Chola period (993–1070 AD) ==
=== Nilaveli Slab Inscription in the reign of Rajaraja I, Trincomalee ===
Nilaveli Slab Inscription, Trincomalee
Background	Translation (English)	Inscription
An inscription found in a Ganesh temple in Nilaveli dated to the reign of Rajaraja I before 993 AD. The name 'Tirukōṇamalai' in the inscription remains the Tamil name for Trincomalee to this day.	'This edict shall be (under the protection of) God Sambhu. The irrigated and dry lands of Kirikanṭakirikāmam and Urākirikāmam, which have as their boundaries the sea on the east, the (slab of) stone on the south, (the locality of) Ettakampē on the west and the stone carved with the figure of a trident on the north, including trees that are growing up, all objects (such as) temples, trees that are growing and wells sunk below (the ground) within these boundaries (are granted) to the temple (God) of Maccakēsvaram on Kōṇaparvatam (otherwise called) Tirukōṇamalai to meet the daily expenses (in the temple) as long as the sun and moon endure. The lands of two-hundred and fifty vēli (in extent) within the great boundaries described herein are the lands of the bluenecked great God (Siva) enshrined at the illustrious peak of Kōṇamāmalai. This grant shall be under the custody of the Panmāhēśvarar. — Translated by S. Pathmanathan,	Nilaveli Tamil inscription, 10th century AD

=== Koneswaram inscription of Rajaraja I, Trincomalee ===
Koneswaram inscription of Rajaraja I, Trincomalee
Background	Translation (English)	Inscription
Fragmentary inscription from the Koneswaram temple in the reign of Rajaraja I. It is dated to before 993 AD as the eulogy of this king is at an earlier stage of development.		Koneswaram inscription of Rajaraja I

=== Kielekadawala Siva kovil inscription of Rajaraja I, Trincomalee ===
Kielekadawala Siva kovil inscription of Rajaraja I, Trincomalee
Background	Translation (English)	Inscription
A rock inscription found in front of an abandoned Siva temple in an isolated corner of the Kielekadawala village, Gomarankadawala, Trincomalee.	A long eulogy dedicated to Rajaraja I is found in the inscription.	

=== Padaviya inscription of the reign of Rajaraja I ===
Padaviya inscription of the reign of Rajaraja I
Background	Translation (English)	Inscription
Slab inscription of Rajaraja Chola I found near the Siva temple Ravikulamanikka-isvaram of Padaviya dated to 1005 AD. It records a eulogy to the Chola king and gifts made to the temple by donors.	From the .... year of the reign of the.....king Rajarāja Rājakesari vanmar alias Sri Rájarājatevar, who having conceived in his mind that, like the goddess Tirumakal (Lakshmi), the damsel named the Great Earth had become his own, was pleased to destroy the ships at Kāntalur-c-Cālai, took with the aid of his highly powerful and victorious army, Venkai-nātu, Kanka pāti.. Nulampapāti, Tațikaipāti, Kutamalainatu, Kollam, Kalinkam, the province of Ilam the conquest of which brought (him) fame in the eight quarters, and Irattapāți Seven and a Half Lakhs, and who carried away the splendour of the Celiyar in the year of his acquiring excessive glory fit for being praised in all the years till the end of time, the following were granted to the Lord of Iravi-kula-māņikka-isvaram: The Illustrious Lord Rājarāja....kan, the Lord of......kalpakkam. granted one sacred perpetual lamp.. ..ciyān. the Lord of .....r, granted one sacred perpetual lamp. Cattan Pakkan, the Lord of ......r, granted one sacred perpetual lamp..........n Tevan granted one sacred perpetual lamp.....vikkirama......Pattālakan granted one sacred perpetual lamp. Kantan ....... granted one sacred perpetual lamp...... kātan Nakkan granted one evening lamp...... tavan Tevan granted one evening lamp. Táran Căttan granted one evening lamp...... Tevan granted one evening lamp. Palavan......nti granted one evening lamp Nănāteciyan Konnāvil Venkātan granted one bronze gong and one bronze bell From the 308th day of the 20th year (of the same reign) Cenkulavan Katampan granted one sacred perpetual lamp. The Lord of Palaipākkam gifted a 'pattam' (jewel) and one 'kalancu' of gold. The Lord of Marunkur granted .....'kalañcu' of gold...... Cattan granted .... kalancu of gold ...... . with the 9 cows......ulakku (measured) by the Rājakesari......ulakku... — Translated by K. Indrapala,	Padaviya inscription of the reign of Rajaraja I - 1005 AD

=== Tirukketisvaram inscription in the reign of Rajaraja I, Mannar ===
Tirukketisvaram inscription in the reign of Rajaraja I, Mannar
Background	Translation (English)	Inscription
An inscription found at Tirukketisvaram in Mannar, Sri Lanka dated to the reign of Rajaraja I (985-1014 AD). It records an endowment to a Hindu temple.	'Tāli Kumaran, the uṭaiyān of Cirukurranallur of Vēlārnātu in Kshatriyaśikhāmaṇi vāḷanātu, a division of Cōlamaṇṭalam constructed the temple of Rājarāja-iśvaram at Mātottam otherwise called Rājarājapuram in Ilam otherwise called Mummuti cōḷamaṇṭalam. To this temple, a perpetual grant is made in the following order. Henceforth he shall remit (to this temple) daily an amount of two vaṭṭam from the incomes collected from those passing through the roads leading to Nakañaikoti nāṭu otherwise called Arumolittēva vaḷanāṭu and the amount collected as tax from the category of lands called piṭilikai. The (annual) festival lasting for seven days including the day of Vicākam, in the month of Vaiyyāci (May–June) shall be conducted with the amounts accumulated from the taxes from the weavers' looms in this city, from the levy called vaṭṭam and from the incomes collected from crossings and boats. Moreover, the water cutting ceremony also shall be performed. The lands situated within the four boundaries.... the Rājarājapperunteru (road) on the west and the hamlet of the artisans on the north, with the exclusion of the house, mansion and garden(s) of Kunran Tāman, a resident of this city, and inclusive of five poles (kōl) to the north, are granted as a tax-free tēvātāṇam to this temple. Levies shall be collected from the weavers' looms in this city at the rate of one-eighth of an akkam per month and from the sellers and buyers of commodities at the rate of one vaṭṭam per kācu of their value. From the amounts thus collected sacred meals shall be served thrice daily by cooking two measures for each session and six measures in all for a day. Paddy and oil shall be supplied daily for two young Brahmins conducting worship and to the one who administers the pilgrims' rest....' — Translated by S. Pathmanathan,	Tirukketisvaram inscription in the reign of Rajaraja I (985-1014 AD) Tirukketisvaram inscription in the reign of Rajaraja I (985-1014 AD)

=== Tirukketisvaram inscriptions in the reign of Rajendra Chola I, Mannar ===
Tirukketisvaram inscriptions in the reign of Rajendra Chola I, Mannar
Background	Translation (English)	Inscription
Two fragmentary inscriptions found on a pillar at Tirukketisvaram in Mannar, Sri Lanka dated to the reign of Rajendra Chola I (1014-1044 AD). One inscription contains the initial portion of a eulogy to the king celebrating his conquests. The other records an endowment to a Hindu temple.	'Hail! (Prosperity) In the....... year of Kō - Parakēcarivarmar, Utaiyār Sri Rājendracola - tēvar, during whose long life (in which) the great Goddess of the earth, the Goddess of Victory in battle and the beautiful and matchless Goddess of Fortune, who had become his great queens, gave him pleasure, while (his own) illustrious queen was prospering -: conquered with (his) great and warlike army Itaiturai-nāṭu (Raichur Doab), Vanāvasi, the roads (to which are bounded by) continuous walls of trees; Kollippakkai, whose walls were surrounded by culḷi trees; Maṇṇaikkaṭakkam (Karnataka) of unapproachable strength the crown of the King of Ilam, (which is situated in the midst of) the rough sea; the exceedingly beautiful crown of the queen of the King of that (country); the beautiful crown which the Pāṇdya King had left (in the custody of the King of Ilam) with him; the pearl-necklace of Indra; the whole of Ilamaṇṭalam surrounded by the waves of the ocean; the crown praised by many, a family inheritance, which was worn by the King of Keraḷa who had an army of formidable strength...'; 'I (Cankaran) Tēvan, the uṭaiyān of Cirukuḷattūr, serving as a member of the body called peruntanam of the illustrious Rājendra Cola Tēvar hāve made this endowment for burning (two) twilight lamp(s) at the shrine of the God (Māhatēvar) of Tiruvirāmiśvaram in Mātōṭṭam otherwise called Rājarājapuram. (The lamps have to be maintained) when the God of the temple is taken in procession on (the night of the eleventh day of) the dark half of the fortnight, with effect from the (coming) month of Āni (June–July) (The endowment comprises) two kācu given to the cankarappāṭiyar of this city; one kācu deposited with the betel dealers of this city and one kācu deposited with the plantain dealers of this city. From the interest accrued from this deposit (twilight lamps shall be maintained)...' — Translated by S. Pathmanathan,	Tirukketisvaram inscriptions of the reign of Rajendra Chola I (1014-1044 AD) Tirukketisvaram inscriptions of the reign of Rajendra Chola I (1014-1044 AD)

=== Pathirakali Amman temple inscription of Rajendra Chola I, Trincomalee ===
Pathirakali Amman temple inscription of Rajendra Chola I, Trincomalee
Background	Translation (English)	Inscription
Fragmentary inscription from the Pathirakali Amman Temple, Trincomalee recording a eulogy of Rajendra Chola I.	'Hail. Prosperity- in (his) life of high prosperity, (during which he) rejoiced that, while fortune, having become constant, was increasing, the goddess of the great earth, the goddess of victory in battle, and the matchless goddess of fame had become his great queens, conquered with (his) great and war like army Idaiturai nätu; Vanaväsi, whose warriors (were protected by) walls of continuous forests; Kollippäkkai, whose walls were surrounded by sulli (trees); Mannaikkadakam of unapproachable strength; the crown of the king of Ilam, who came to close quarters in fighting; the exceedingly beautiful crown of the queen of the king of that (country); the crown of Sundara and the pearl - necklace of Indra, which the king of the south (ie., the Pändya) had previously given up to that (king of llam); the whole Ilam mandalam on the transparent sea; the crown praised by many and the garland of the sun, family treasures, which the arrow-shooting (king of) Kerala rightfully wore and the many ancient islands whose old and great guard was the sea, which sounds with conches; the crown of pure gold, worthy of Lakshmi, which Parasuräma, having considered the fortifications of Sändimattivu impregnable, had deposited (there), when, raging with anger, (he) bound the kings twenty-one times; the seven and a half lakhs as of Iratta-Pädi, (which was) strong by nature, (the conquest of which was accompanied) with immeasurable fame, (and which he took from) Jayasimha, who, out of fear (and) full of vengeance, turned his back at Muyangi and hid himself; and the principal great mountains, (which contained) the nine treasures. — Translated by S. Gunasingam,	

=== Slab inscription of Rajendra Chola I from Trincomalee Fort ===
Slab inscription of Rajendra Chola I from Trincomalee Fort
Background	Translation (English)	Inscription
Slab inscription from Fort Fredrick recording a eulogy of Rajendra Chola I.	'In the year (of his reign) of Kô-Parakesarivarman, alias the Lord Sri Räjendra Côladeva, who conquered with (his) great and warlike army, the camp of Mannai, whose strength (i. e. fortifications) was unapproachable; the crown of the king of Ilam, who came to close quarters in fighting; the exceedingly beautiful crown of the queen of that (king) the beautiful crown and Indra's pearl-necklace which the king of the south (i.e. the Pändya) had previously deposited with that (king of Ilam); the whole Ilamandalam on the transparent sea; the crown praised by many and the garland (emitting) beautiful rays, - family treasures, which the kings of Kerala, whose armies overcame (opponents), rightfully wore; (and) many ancient islands, whose old and great guard was the sea, which resounds with conches — Translated by S. Gunasingam,	

=== Two fragmentary Chola Inscriptions from Kayts Fort, Jaffna ===
Two fragmentary Chola Inscriptions from Kayts Fort, Jaffna
Background	Translation (English)	Inscription
Two fragmentary Chola inscriptions from Kayts fort, Jaffna recording a eulogy to a viceroy of Rajendra Chola I celebrating his conquests.	'Hail! Prosperity. (The agent of Rajendra (Cola tevar) who is exercising authority as the supreme commander and seized and took away from Ilam otherwise called mummuṭicola-maṇṭalam the crown that was the inheritance of the Pandya (lineage of) kings, the crown of the King of Ilam, the crown of his queen and his consorts)' 'Hail! Prosperity. (At) Mātōttam otherwise called Irācarácapu(ram), Jayaňkonta Cola Muvēntavēḷār, who is invested with (supreme) authority, conquered the whole of Ilam and took away the King of Ilam and his consort (queen)' — Translated by S. Pathmanathan,	Two fragmentary Chola Inscriptions from Kayts Fort - 11th century AD

=== Siva Devale No. 2 inscription, Polonnaruwa ===
Siva Devale No. 2 inscription, Polonnaruwa
Background	Translation (English)	Inscription
A record of an endowment made to the Siva temple in Pulanari (Tamilised form of Polonnaruwa).	'Having received 124 cows he shall supply three ulakku and one alakku of ghee daily for burning lamps perpetually (until the moon and the sun last) at the temple of this God established at Jananātapuram otherwise called Pulanari (a subdivision) of Nikariliccōla- vaḷanāṭu. The cows shall be considered as those that do not grow old or die.' — Translated by S. Pathmanathan,	Siva Devale No.2 Tamil inscription, Polonnaruwa

=== Three fragmentary Chola inscriptions from Polonnaruwa ===
Three fragmentary Chola inscriptions from Polonnaruwa
Background	Translation (English)	Inscription
Fragmentary Polonnaruwa inscriptions from the reign of Rajendra Chola I (1014-1044 AD) recording endowments to a temple.	'A perpetual lamp shall be burned at this shrine by supplying ghee (of the amount of)... ulakku. For that purpose made an endowment of a tirunontā viḷakku (perpetual lamp) and 80 cows for burning it with an uninterrupted supply of ghee at the rate of an uri (half a measure) per day.' 'A lamp of alloyed metal (tarānilal viḷakku), two spans in length (has been granted) and also thirty cows for supplying ghee at the rate of an ulakku per day, with which the lamp should be burned at this temple (ittēvarkku) ' — Translated by S. Pathmanathan,	Fragmentary Polonnaruwa Tamil inscriptions

=== Three fragmentary Chola inscriptions from Siva Devale No. 2, Polonnaruwa ===
Three fragmentary Chola inscriptions from Siva Devale No. 2, Polonnaruwa
Background	Translation (English)	Inscription
Fragmentary inscriptions from Polonnaruwa that initially recorded an endowment to the temple 'Vānavanmātēvi - isvaram'. A eulogy to Rajendra Chola I (1014-1044 AD) is also present.	'Hail Prosperity. In the - year of Parakēcarivarmar uṭaiyār Śri Rājendra Cola tēvar during whose long life in which, the great goddess of the earth, the goddess of victory in battles and the beautiful and matchless goddess of fortune, who had become his great queens, gave him pleasure, while (his own) illustrious queen was prospering, conquered with (his) great and warlike army Iṭaituraināṭu, Vanavāsi, the roads (to) which are bounded by continuous rows of trees and Kollippākkai...' '(also) the (image) of the deity residing at Vānavanmātēvi - isvaram' '(Having) set up the image of Alakiya Maṇavāḷar' — Translated by S. Pathmanathan,	Tamil inscription 1 from Siva Devale No. 2 - 11th century AD Tamil inscription 2 from Siva Devale No. 2 - 11th century AD

=== Four short inscriptions from Siva Devale No. 1, Padaviya ===
Four short inscriptions from Siva Devale No. 1, Padaviya
Background	Translation (English)	Inscription
Inscriptions engraved on stones built into the walls at the temple recording endowments. They are dated to the early 11th century in the reign of Raja Raja Chola I (985-1014 AD).	'1. (This) stone (was) laid by Nārāyanan, the ūṭaiyān of Tiruccirrampalam (Chidambaram).: 2. Hail prosperity. This stone was laid by (Varutan Tirumāl..) This stone was laid by Uttamarālaiyan.; 3. Hail prosperity. This stone was laid by Alakan Uttaman otherwise called Tēci(c) cettiyārāṇa Ayyattunaic cetti.; 4. Hail prosperity. This stone was laid by Tani Appan, the merchant from Pati.'; — Translated by S. Pathmanathan,	Siva Devale No. 1 Tamil inscriptions, Padaviya

=== Kantaḷāy Chola Lankeswaran inscription, Trincomalee ===
Kantaḷāy Chola Lankeswaran inscription, Trincomalee
Background	Translation (English)	Inscription
Tamil inscription found in Kantaḷāy, Trincomalee District in the reign of Rajendra Chola I (1014-1044 AD). It records a meeting in the Brahmadeya (Brahmin village) when a Chola viceroy Lankeswaran was ruling.	'Hail prosperity. We the members of the great assembly of the brahmadeya called Rājarāja - caturvedimankalam of Rājendracolavaḷanāṭu otherwise called Rājaviccātira-vaḷaṇāṭu, having met in the night of Tuesday, when the star Ayiliyam was ascendant, and which was the twelfth day of the month of Kumbha (Māci) in the tenth year of King Sri Cankavarmar His majesty ColaIlankesvara Tēvar.... mūttavakai-Kōyil Māni, who is the collector of revenues of our úr (town or village)' — Translated by S. Pathmanathan,	Kantaḷāy Chola Lankeswaran inscription - 11th century AD

=== Mānānkēni Chola Lankeswaran inscription, Trincomalee ===
Mānānkēni Chola Lankeswaran inscription, Trincomalee
Background	Translation (English)	Inscription
Tamil inscription found in Mānānkēni, Trincomalee District in the reign of Rajendra Chola I (1014-1044 AD) when a Chola viceroy Lankeswaran was ruling. It refers to constructional activity at the Koneswaram Temple.	The inscription is in a fragmented form and cannot be fully translated. It refers to the viceroy Sri Cola Ilankesvara Devar and the Koneswaram temple.	

=== Sangilikanadarawa Chola inscription, Anuradhapura ===
Sangilikanadarawa Chola inscription, Anuradhapura
Background	Translation (English)	Inscription
Tamil inscription found in Sangilikanadarawa, Anuradhapura in the reign of Rajendra Chola I (1014-1044 AD). The inscription registers the grant of land and the deposit of some money on interest by a Chola army chief Jayamurinātālavān to a temple.		

=== Diyavinna inscription, Sabaragamuwa ===
Diyavinna inscription, Sabaragamuwa
Background	Translation (English)	Inscription
A Tamil inscription found in Diyavinna, Sabaragamuva stating that a person named 'Virabhavanan Dahalabhha Mallam' arrived at this place. His warrior name suggests that he may have been a Chola soldier operating against the Rohana princes in the central highlands. Alternatively, he may just be an adventurer.		

=== Sixteen Tamil Buddhist inscriptions from Velgam Vihara, Trincomalee ===
Sixteen Tamil Buddhist inscriptions from Velgam Vihara, Trincomalee
Background	Translation (English)	Inscription
16 Tamil inscriptions recording donations by Tamil Buddhists to the ancient Velgam Vehera in Trincomalee District dated to the period of Chola rule (993-1070 AD). Eulogies to the Chola kings are also found here. The temple was renamed and reconstructed as Rajarajapperumpaḷḷi (Great Vihara of Rajaraja I). The base mouldings of this vihara are of Dravidian architecture and differ from other Buddhist edifices in the island. Senarath Paranavithana describes it as the only known example of 'a Tamil Buddhist paḷḷi' preserved up to the present day.	'Hail! Prosperity! While (the Goddess of) Fortune was constantly growing, (and) while the great (Goddess named) Lady Earth, the Lady of Victory in Battle and the damsel (named) Matchless Fame having become his great queens, were rejoicing, [he conquered], in [his] life of high prosperity, Itaiturai - nātu, Vanavāci, which is encircled by a continuous hedge of forest, Kollippakkai whose ramparts were surrounded by 'culli' (trees), Mannaikkaṭakkam whose fortifications were unapproachable, the crown of the King of Ilam (Ceylon) (protected by the) warlike sea, the exceedingly beautiful crown of his queen and the fine crown and the garland of Intiran (Indra) which the Tennavar (ie, the Pandya ruler) had (previously) deposited with the former (i. e., the King of Ceylon), and the whole of Ila - maṇṭalam (Province of Ceylon) (surrounded) by the clear sea, the crown praised by many and the garland emitting red rays - the heirlooms - which were rightfully worn by the Keraḷan with the victorious army, the many ancient islands whose old great guard was the ocean which makes the conches resound, the crown of pure gold, worthy of Tiru (Laksmi) that had been deposited in Cantimattivu, in view of its strong fortress, by Parasuraman who, roused in war, had uprooted the kings (everywhere) twenty - one times, and.....out of fear and to his great disrepute, turned his back at Muyanki and hid.....' '(Rajendra Cōla captured) Iraṭtapăṭi Seven and a Half Lakhs (which was) strong by nature, and vast quantities of the nine kinds of treasure, together with the inestimable reputation of Jayacinkan (Jayasinha), who turned his back at Muyanki and hid himself, Cakkarakkottam whose warriors were brave, Maturamaṇṭalam destroyed in a trice, the prosperous (city of) Namanaikkonam with its dense groves, Pañcappaḷḷi with fierce and angry warriors, Mācuṇitēcam with its green fields; a full... together with many (other) treasures (which he carried away), after having captured Intiraratan (Indraratha) of the ancient race of the moon, together with (his) family in the battle at Atinakar (a city), whose great fame knew no decline.....' '.......the ancient Malaiyur with the strong mountain for its rampart, Māyiruṭinkam, which is surrounded by the deep sea that is the moat, Ilankācākam, which is undaunted in fierce battles, Māppappālam, which is defended by abundant water, Mēviḷimpankam, which is defended by fine walls, Vaḷaippantūru which has 'viḷaippantūru', Talaittakkōlam, which is praised by men proficient in the arts, Māttāmalinkam (which is a place) of fierce and cruel battles, Ilāmuritēcam whose fierce strength makes (those who wage) war disintegrate, Mānakkavāram, in whose extensive flower gardens honey was collecting, Kitāram, of fierce strength, which is guarded by the deep sea' 'Atitta-p-pēraraiyan Sri Palavan (Satyāśrayan) (the uṭaiyān) of Putukkuṭi granted 1 perpetual lamp and 84 cows to Velka-vēram otherwise called Rajaraja-perum paḷḷi in Māṇāvatiḷānāṭu,' 'In the 12th year of King Parakēcari-panmar otherwise called Sri Rajendra Coḷa-tēvar, Tariyanan Puvaṇatēvam of Kōlam granted 1 perpetual lamp and 4 kācu to the tēvar of Velkavēram. May the members of the Sangha in this monastery provide the oil for the lamp.' 'The fifteenth year of the illustrious Rājendra Cōla Tēvar. Granted 35 cows and five buffaloes for the sake of merit, to the Buddha of Rājarājap-perumpaḷḷi otherwise called Velkam Vēram of Manāvāttilā kāmam in Viraparakēcari vaḷaṇāṭu otherwise called Mēvat (tila valanatu) in Mummuticola-maṇṭalam.' 'Hail! Prosperity. In the 15th year of King Parakēcarivarmar Rājendracōla Tēvar who conquered Pūrvatēcam, (the Country of the Ganges and Kaṭāram) Kāyānku uṭaiyān Amutan-Căttan granted ten buffaloes as an offering for (the purpose of supplying) three ulakku (of ghee) daily for (maintaining) one perpetual lamp which was set up, so that it may burn as long as the sun and moon last, for (the benefit of) the Puttar (Buddha) of Velkam Vēram otherwise called Rājarāja-p-perumpaḷḷi at Velkāmam in Irājendracinka vaḷanāṭu otherwise called Abhayāśraya-vaḷanātu.' 'On the fifth day of the ... fortnight, which day was a Thursday and a day on which the naksatra was pucam (Skt. 'Pusya') a standing lamp of alloyed metal was granted. (May) this burn as a sacred perpetual lamp as long as the sun and moon last.' 'The perpetual lamp given by Kantan Yakkan of Erānāṭu.' — Translated by S. Pathmanathan,	Velgam Vihara Tamil inscription, 11th century AD Velgam Vihara Tamil inscription, 11th century AD Velgam Vihara Tamil inscription, 11th century AD Velgam Vihara Tamil inscription, 11th century AD Velgam Vihara Tamil inscription, 11th century AD Velgam Vihara Tamil inscription, 11th century AD

=== Atakada inscription recording endowment to Saiva Temple ===
Atakada inscription recording endowment to Saiva Temple
Background	Translation (English)	Inscription
Atakada inscription recording an endowment to a Siva temple of the 11th century AD called Uttamacola isvaram in North Central Province, Sri Lanka.	'I, Arankan Irāmēsan, have made an endowment to the temple of Uttamacōḷa-īśvaram, of three vēli of land at Teliyalpērru of Kallai and 20 cows for maintaining a perpetual lamp. Besides (a land with) fifty coconut trees has been given for burning five twilight lamps.' — Translated by S. Pathmanathan,	Atakada Tamil inscription, 11th century AD.

=== Four pillar inscriptions from Polonnaruwa ===
Four pillar inscriptions from Polonnaruwa
Background	Translation (English)	Inscription
Four pillar inscriptions found near Siva Devale. No. 5 recording the names of Chola officials in Polonnaruwa.	'1. Tiruppūvaṇi tēvan, the uṭaiyān of Mōkaṇūr: 2. Tiyākacintāmaṇi, a mūvēntavēḷān, the chieftain of Tillai.; 3. Karpavali, the daughter of Mukari-nātāḷvān; 4. Pañcanetivāṇaṇ, the uṭaiyān of Nallūr'; — Translated by S. Pathmanathan,	Four pillar inscriptions from Polonnaruva, 11th century AD

=== Ainnurruvar Slab inscription from Ataragala, Puttalam ===
Ainnurruvar Slab inscription from Ataragala, Puttalam
Background	Translation (English)	Inscription
Slab inscription found in Ataragala, Puttalam District recording the construction of a building for Tamil merchants (Ainnurruvar) attached to a Chola military unit in the reign of Rajendra Chola I (1014–1054).	'Hail Prosperity! In the twenty-fourth year of the illustrious King Rajendra Colan, they constructed the elegant building called (temple) Ayirattaññürruvan - ampalam for the Aññurruvar attached to the virar-vēḷam of selected heroes of Irācēntira - Colan. In the twenty-fourth year of Parakēcari tēvar who conquered Purvatēcam, the country of the Ganges and Kaṭāram, Pelavān araiyan, a leader of the warriors of the Nānādesis, caused to be constructed this strong and beautiful Aññurruvan - ampalam, which is becoming famous as more and more people seek protection under your name' — Translated by S. Pathmanathan,	Ataragala Tamil inscription

=== Colombo museum Rajendra Chola II inscription ===
Colombo museum Rajendra Chola II inscription
Background	Translation (English)	Inscription
Pillar inscription set up in the reign of Rajendra Chola II (1054-1063 AD). It records the establishment of a Vishnu temple in the southern part of Anuradhapura, and the donations made to it by an agent of the king.	'In the second (regal) year of the heroic (King) Rājendra devar, the celebrated victor at the battle field of Koppam, the chieftain Pallavarāyan Mūvēntavēḷān who resembles Puruşōttaman (Krishna) in beauty, had caused the construction of the Vişnu temple called Mummuṭicola Viṇṇakar in the southern part of Anurādhapura. This chieftain, who possessed wealth in abundance, also caused to be made a lying-in chamber with a canopy of peacock feathers for the Lord adorned with brilliant ornaments, who was in a tall sitting posture.' — Translated by S. Pathmanathan,	Colombo museum Rajendra Chola II inscription, 1054-1063 AD

=== Medirigiriya Tamil slab inscription, Polonnaruwa ===
Medirigiriya Tamil slab inscription, Polonnaruwa
Background	Translation (English)	Inscription
Inscription found in Medirigiriya, Polonnaruwa District dated to 1054 AD in the reign of Rajendra Chola II. It records donations to a Hindu temple in the area.	'Hail prosperity. The second year of King Parakēcari-panmar śri Rājendra Colan. Valavan Pilāttūaravan who is one (of the warriors) among the Ilaiya Mummuṭicola Aṇukkar and of the perumpaṭai (Great Army), granted 26 cows for burning a perpetual lamp (that he had) granted in the name of his son... Nārāyaṇan to the God of Pantitacōla-iśvaram at Nittavinōtapuram otherwise called Manṭalakiri.' — Translated by S. Pathmanathan,	Medigiriya Tamil inscription - 11th century AD

=== Vanavanmatevi-isvaram inscription, Polonnaruwa ===
Vanavanmatevi-isvaram inscription, Polonnaruwa
Background	Translation (English)	Inscription
Inscriptions from the Vanavanmatevi-isvaram, Polonnaruwa in the reign of Athirajendra Chola (1067-1070 AD) recording a eulogy to the king and endowments made to the temple. The administration of the temple is also outlined in this inscription.	'Hail Prosperity. While (the King's) white parasol was raised, expanding like the moon, diffusing sweet mercy on all creatures that abide on the globe, and affording royal protection; while (his) sceptre rightfully swayed all the quarters; (and) while the matchless wheel (of his authority) rolled about the universe that is invigorated by the rays of the sun, the progenitor of his lineage (kulam); (he) took as his consorts in wedlock (vatuvai) the goddess of the beautiful (lotus) flower (Lakşmi), whose austerities (thus) bore fruit, the goddess of the great earth, the goddess of fame, (who resembles) a parrot in beauty, and the matchless goddess of (victory) in war, and adorned (them) with crowns of brilliant Jewels as his rightful queens while the kings of this vast earth worshipped his feet by turns, and wearing as his ornament qualities of heroism and liberality and having established laws of Manu and his fame, (kankaikonṭa) colp-pallavaraju a vellalan of Mankalappaṭi in Virpēṭṭu-nāṭu, a subdivision of kottam in Colamaṇṭalam, made this endowment of a perpetual lamp (tirunonta vilakku) and five (gold) kācu for burning it daily with one ulakku of oil, at the temple of Vānavan mātēvi-iśvaram situated at Jananatamankalam in Rājarājendracola-valanātu, with effect from the month of Cittirai (April–May). The administration of this endowment shall be the responsibility of the Brāhmaṇa kramavittan of Kōmatam who conducts worship (at the temple) in his capacity as one among those who perform services (within the innermost precinits) and dressed in garments of silk (as a mark of distinction); Tillaināyaka pattan, a Sivabrahmaṇa of this temple; the uvaccan;... kankaikontacola... ācāriyan; Rājādhirāja Muttakkarai-naṭāḷvān, who is responsible for providing protection in the capacity on an araiyan (leader of a military group); the overseers (kaṇkāṇi) of the māheśvaras (worshippers) at this temple; (the dancers:)... kaňkaikonṭa-colamānikkam, Kāman Tiruvi otherwise called Kōtukula Manikkam, Küttan Irājendra vitaňka-mānikkam, Kōvintan Āṭavallāṇ otherwise called Nārpatteṇṇāyira-māṇikkam, Tēvankāmi otherwise called Rajendracola - māṇikkam, Tēvan Uyyavantān otherwise called Muṭikontacola - mānikkam and those who perform the sacred duties assigned to them, by turns in rotation after them at this temple, those supervising the Māhesvaras, the residents of the nātu (nātřār); those who prepare the sacred offerings (paricārakar) and those conducting worship at the sacred feet of God in the sanctum having agreed to burn a perpetual lamp till the moon and the sun endure, received five kācu and one lamp of bell metal 2 spans and 4 fingers long. This endowment is under protection of the Māhesvaras.' — Translated by S. Pathmanathan,	Vanavanmatevi-isvaram inscription, 11th century AD Vanavanmatevi-isvaram inscription, 11th century AD Vanavanmatevi-isvaram inscription, 11th century AD Vanavanmatevi-isvaram inscription, 11th century AD Vanavanmatevi-isvaram inscription, 11th century AD

=== Chola inscription from Jaffna Fort ===
Chola inscription from Jaffna Fort
Background	Translation (English)	Inscription
The oldest Tamil stone inscription found in Jaffna. The record was originally set up in a Hindu temple in Nallur, Jaffna between 1018 and 1021 AD in the reign of Rajendra Chola I. The fragmentary inscription records the donation of livestock to the temple by a donor called Cattan.	'Hail! Prosperity! While (the Goddess of) Fortune was constantly growing, (and) while the great (Goddess named) Lady Earth, the Lady of Victory in Battle and the damsel (named) Matchless Fame having become his great queens, were rejoicing, in [his] life of high prosperity,' (Rajendra I)...conquered, with his great and warlike army, Itaiturai-nāṭu (Raichur Doab), Vanāvasi which is encircled by a continuous hedge of forest, Kollippakkal whose ramparts were surrounded by cuḷḷi trees, Maṇṇaikkaṭakkam (Karnataka) whose fortifications were unapproachable, the crown of the king of Ilam (protected by the) warlike sea, the exceedingly beautiful crowns of his queen and the fine crown and garland of Intiran (Indra) which the Tennavar (i.e. the Pandyan ruler) had (previously) deposited with the former (king of Ceylon) and the whole of Ila-mandalam (province of Ceylon) (surrounded) by the clear sea, the crown praised by many and the garland emitting red rays - the heirlooms - which were rightfully worn by the Keralan with the victorious army, the many ancient islands whose old, great guard was the ocean which makes the conches resound, the crown of pure gold, worthy of Tiru (Lakshmi) that had been deposited in Cantimattivu, in view of its strong fortress by Paracuraman who roused in war, had uprooted the kings (everywhere) twenty one times. The illustrious Rajendra Cola Tevar.........I........an Cattan,......of....(granted) ten (?)......, that neither die nor age, for (obtaining)......ghee,.......till the sun and moon last.....for......lamp.....set up......(at)......Nallur,....(in) Ilam alias Mum.............' — Translated by K. Indrapala,	

=== Chola era Tamil inscriptions from Thirumangalai, Trincomalee ===
Chola era Tamil inscriptions from Thirumangalai, Trincomalee
Background	Translation (English)	Inscription
Three Tamil slab inscriptions dating to the Chola era (993-1070 AD), were found in the ruins of a Siva temple in Thirumangalai, Trincomalee District.	The inscriptions record administrative regulations of the temple as well as donations from officials like Siṟṟampalam Uṭaiyāi, Tiruveṇṇaikkūṭṟaṉ Tiruvarahiruvarańkam and others.	

=== Ainnurruvar Polonnaruva Bolappaḷḷi inscription ===
Ainnurruvar Polonnaruva Bolappaḷḷi inscription
Background	Translation (English)	Inscription
An 11th century inscription found in the remains of a Saiva temple between the North gate of the medieval city of Polonnaruwa and the Rankot Vihara. It records the close connection Tamil merchants (Ainnurruvar) had with Buddhist shrines (paḷḷi) in the city.	'Hail prosperity! This Bolāppaḷḷi of Bagicinakay is the perum paḷḷi of the "Annārruvar of the thousand directions, the Nānātēci of the eighteen countries, who are renowned in all directions".' — Translated by S. Pathmanathan,	Ainnurruvar Bolappaḷḷi inscription, 11th century AD

== Polonnaruwa period (1070–1215 AD) ==
Following the expulsion of the Cholas, Vijayabāhu I retained their administrative structure and made significant changes only at the top. The reference to a register of Tamil clerks (Demaḷa lesdaru pota) in Vijayabāhu's Panakaduva Copper Plate inscription points to his employment of Tamil officers in the administration. Possibly many of them continued in service from the time of Chola rule.

=== Vēḷaikkārar slab inscription of Vijayabahu I, Polonnaruwa ===
Vēḷaikkārar slab inscription of Vijayabahu I, Polonnaruwa
Background	Translation (English)	Inscription
An inscription engraved by Tamil Vēḷaikkārar troops in the 12th century AD celebrating the reign of Vijayabahu I. The Vēḷaikkārar also pledge to protect the Tooth Relic temple.	'Hail Prosperity. The Tooth Relic temple constructed at Pulastipura, by Deva, the senāpati, on the order of King Sri Vijayabāhu, and the temples in its neighbourhood shall be protected by the combined army of the Veḷaikkāra forces, till the end of this world at the junction of the kalpas. Worship to the Buddha. King Sanghabodhivarmar otherwise called chakravarttikal Vijayabāhudevar, who was born in the lineage of Ikşvāku of the solar dynasty in the resplendent isle of Lanka, subdued many enemies, entered Anuradhapuram and went through the ceremony of coronation with the blessings of the Sangha for the sake of protecting the Buddhasāsana. He lived for 73 years and reigned for 55 years in accordance with the ten principles of regal duty after bringing the whole of Lanka under the single canopy of his dominion. He invited monks from Arumanam (Burma) and effected a purification of the communities of monks of the three nikāyas, conducted three tulābhāra ceremonies and distributed valuables (equal to his weight) among the monks of the three nikāyas. He caused the Abhayagiri mahāvihāram to be constructed at Pulanari otherwise called Vijayarājapuram by appointing that purpose Nuvarakal Deva, a commander of the army. Uttoruḷmūḷai is the principal monastery of the Abhayagiri mahāvihāram. Attached to it is the Daḷadāypperumpalḷi, the permanent repository of the divine lords, the Tooth and Alms Bowl Relics which are like unto the crest jewels of the three worlds. It is also the image house for the beneficent colossal stone image of buddhamahādevar where the annual festival of applying paint (or collyrium) is performed and bliss is conferred at sight. The mahāsthavira vyārini Mugalan, the royal preceptor, well versed in all religious doctrines and branches of learning, of exemplary conduct and behaviour, invited us while he was seated at Uttoruḷmūḷai in the presence of the King's ministers and said: "The great temple of the Tooth Relic should be under your protection." Thereupon, we the members of the great army assembled together, and having invited for the meeting the Valanceyar, who are our patrons, and also the nakarattār and others who always accompany us, invested the temple of the Tooth Relic with the illustrious name mūnrukait tiruvēlaikkaran daḷadāyp perumpaḷḷi and resolved that it should be under our protection and maintenance, and for the purpose of this meritorious duty we undertake the responsibility of assigning one serviceman and one vēli of land from each unit of the army, to protect the villages attached to this shrine, its employees and treasures as well as those who seek refuge therein, even in the event of death and destruction caused to us, to replace the loss to the personnel and property thus assigned and to do everything required for this purpose at all times and as long as our lineage endures. In order that this undertaking shall continue as long as the moon and the sun endure, we the illustrious Vēḷaikkārar of many categories including the valankai, itankai, cirutanam, pilḷaikaḷtanam, vatukar, malayāḷar and parivārakkontam attested this document with our own hands, and have caused it to be engraved on copper and stone. Any one who violates this arrangement or persuades others to do so, a person who had become the enemy of the army and had betrayed the mātantiram, one who has committed heinous sins, the ruthless sinner who robs the offerings to the tēvar, pūtar and ascetics and the one who commits sacrilege against the triple gem: the Buddha, Dhamma and Sangha, shall enter hell. Forget not charity. Hail prosperity.' — Translated by S. Pathmanathan,	Polonnaruwa inscription of Vijayabahu I - 12th century AD Polonnaruwa inscription of Vijayabahu I - 12th century AD

=== Palamottai slab inscription in the reign of Vijayabahu I, Trincomalee ===
Palamottai slab inscription in the reign of Vijayabahu I, Trincomalee
Background	Translation (English)	Inscription
Slab inscription found among Saiva temple ruins in Palamottai, Kantalai in the Trincomalee District. It records donations made to a Siva temple named after Vijayabahu I.	'Hail prosperity. In the 42nd year of King (Ciri-Cankabodhi) varmar otherwise called Sri Vijayabāhu - devar. Nankaicāni, the wife of the Brāhmanan Kārāmpiccettu Yajñiya Kramavittan, residing at this village, made this endowment to the God of Vijayarāja - iśvaram otherwise called Ten Kailasam in Kantaḷāy otherwise called Vijayarājacaturvvedimankalam for the merit of her husband after his death. The endowment consists (of the following items): a crown of six kalancu of gold; a necklace of three kalañcu of gold; 1 kācu (granted) for burning one evening lamp; 8 kācu granted to a person for investment as a permanent deposit for maintaining a garden from the income; one kācu for the purpose of making up any loss to this gold; 2 kācu for making up for further losses; 23 kācu were deposited as an endowment so that the income from this amount could be used for supporting seven women dedicated to the service of God as dancing girls after having placed brand - marks on their foreheads. This 35 kācu and nine kalancu of gold have been granted so that the perpetual endowment may continue from what is accrued as interest, the capital remaining unspent. The Vēḷaikkārar of the selected Valankai division of Vikkirama Calāmēkan are assigned the responsibility of administering this endowment without any loss (to the items granted).' — Translated by S. Pathmanathan,	Palamottai slab inscription in the reign of Vijayabahu I

=== Padaviya Virasasana inscription ===
Padaviya Virasasana inscription
Background	Translation (English)	Inscription
Tamil slab inscriptions of the Ainnurruvar merchants based at the merchant town of Padaviya dating to the 12th century AD.	'The Five Hundred of the thousand directions of the 18-bhūmi, who protect the entire world, who are adorned with five hundred heroic charters, who are renowned for their might, who are the children of Goddess Paramēśvari of Aiyapolil, who transact their samaya tanmam happily in 18 pattinam having streets with tall sky-scraping mansions, in 32 vēḷāpuram, and in 64 katikati-tāvalam......comprising ceṭṭi, ceṭṭi-puttiran, kavarai, kātrivan, kāmuntasvāmi, ōttan, ulpacumpaikkaran, palakai, kōttai,., cinkam, pāpuli-vinkam, ., mañcaraviran, mārvattumālai, ankakkāran, āvanakkāran, ..., konkavā!-700, panmai-300, Parantakavīrar, Attikōcam, Tantaḷi-nańkai-vīrar, Vaṭataḷi-naṇkai-virar, ücitolil- vāriyan, kalutai, and kalutai-më (ykkum pākan)......while all these were carrying on their samaya tanmai with the unswerving sceptre as their goal and with their fame known everywhere - so that righteousness may thrive and evil may dissipate, We, the 18-bhūmi Virakkoti of Pati otherwise called Southern (ten) Aipoḷil-valapattanam including Vikrama kaṭikaittāvaḷam, having assembled in full, namely: 1. Nāṭṭuc cetti Anantan Arankan, 2. Teci valarkka vaḷarkira Korrik kāḷikana valaňkaip perumpaṭai Pillai năṭṭuc ceṭṭi, 3. ... cetti Uttama colan otherwise called ..cetti Vittiyāparaña valankaiyar Kōtukulam āḷvān Civacarancēkara nāṭṭuc cetti, 4. ... Kavarai otherwise called Virakal Coruṭai nātfuc ceṭti, 5. Cankirārru Kulakēcari otherwise called Tēci vaḷerka valkira Teci Matavārnappilḷai otherwise called Tēcic cakkaram otherwise called Matavāranm, 6. Nakkan Peruman otherwise called Teci Ankakkāran, 7. ... Kūrran otherwise called Ciruṭai nănă.., 8. Amūr ... maṭi kanka..., 9. ...ciramuṭai... Anete Antāne, 10. ... cōruṭaiya .. tēcivalarkka vaḷarkira.; 11. Curri alias Kāḷikaṇa ., 12. Araiyan ... nānā....; 13. Amūrăcan otherwise called by the alternate names Nāṇātēci, Koňku (puto lilan] Valankai ., 14. Tēvaṇ Ācankan .nṭan'...decided to contribute the money (panam), cloth (pāvāṭai), and all (those) we are entitled to in this town for the lamp service to God Vitankar Valankai-Vēḷaikkaran....If anybody dares to do harm to this decision he should be treated as one of pigs and dogs. Thus we made this heroic charter (vira sāsanam). Do not forget charity. This stone of virataḷam was caused to be planted by Anantan Arankan — Translated by S. Pathmanathan,	Padaviya Virasasana inscription, 12th century AD

=== Kulnoor potters' inscription, Trincomalee ===
Kulnoor potters' inscription, Trincomalee
Background	Translation (English)	Inscription
A Tamil slab inscription dating to the 11th-12th century AD, was found in Trincomalee in October 2010. It was found on land on the right side of the Koneswaram Road leading to the Koneswaram temple.	The inscription records the grant to a leader of a merchant company of pottery makers. According to the slab a village called Kulnoor was granted to the potters.	Kulnoor potters' inscription Kulnoor potters' inscription Kulnoor potters' inscription

=== Budumuttava Virakkoti inscription ===
Budumuttava Virakkoti inscription
Background	Translation (English)	Inscription
An inscription by the Virakkoti, a merchant military community who the Sinhala Weerakkody are descended from. It records an endowment made to a Buddhist temple maintained by Tamil merchants (Annuruvan-paḷḷi) as well to the deity Paramesvari after they were aided in a skirmish by the council of a merchant town in Magala.	'Hail prosperity. They who obtained the 500 heroic charters, who are adorned by Lakşmi whose fame as heroes spreads over the entire world and who are of the lineages of śri Vāsudeva, Kandali and Mülabhadra are the children of Paramēśvari of Ayyappolil. The perumakkaḷ (council) of Vikkiramacalāmēkapuram otherwise called Mākal honoured the patinenpūmi virakkoṭiyar in several ways. While Valankaiyānṭān, a member of the Virakkoṭiyār, was proceeding with his associates he was obstructed by (some) enemies. These adversaries were stabbed and our associates were released; while Konkavāḷāṇṭān had, some problems in an encounter, the enemy was caught and handed over to the (Virakkoṭit) tantiram. Besides, they protected the Virakkotiyar in several ways and conferred the name Viramākalam to the temple of Lōkamātā who begat the Vaiśrāvaṇar (the merchant community). For all these benefactions made by them, we have decided to grant our lamp - oil and money dues we have been collecting to the deities Paramesvari and Lōkapperum - cettiyār of Aññurruvanpaḷli. We also relinquished the lamp-oil collected in lieu of the money dues and we shall provide a meal for the collector of the above dues and give six kācu as of old towards his cloth money. We promise to protect this gift (according to our chivalrous tradition) Do not forget charity. This is the stone (inscription) of the virataḷam.' — Translated by S. Pathmanathan,	Budumuttava Virakkoti inscription

=== Vahalkada slab inscription, Anurādhapura ===
Vahalkada slab inscription, Anurādhapura
Background	Translation (English)	Inscription
An inscription found in the Vahalkada tank in the northern part of Anuradhapura District. It records a heroic charter of various Tamil merchant and military communities in a merchant town established in the 11th century AD.	'The refuge of the whole world, The Viravalanceyar who had obtained the five-hundred heroic charters (virasāsanas), who possess the glittering long spears, who are adorned by Lakşmi who are of the lineages of Sri Vāsudeva, Kandali and Mūlabhadra, who are the children of Paramesvari of Śri Ayyappoḷil, conduct their business with exemplary patience, from the eighteen paṭṭinam with their terraced buildings, which rise so high as to mingle with the shade of moon light, the thirty-two vēlāpuram and the sixty four katikait-tāvalam, in association with the Ceṭṭis, Ceṭṭiputras, the Kavarai of the Kāsyapa lineage, Kāmuṇṭasvāmi, Ankakkārar, Avaṇakkarar... Konkavāḷar 300, and the Korrakkuṭaip panmaiyar 300. Because of their activities the sceptre of the King is held aloft, virtue prospers, evil disappears and enemies are subdued. In Kaṭṭaṇēripuram otherwise called Nānātēciya Veerampaṭṭinam established by the Ticai-āyirattu Annārruvar, the paṭṭinam consists of the following (members): 1. Kaṇṭanāṭtuc-ceṭtiyar who kills the enemies of the Tēci and who has the epithet Alakiya Maṇavāḷar who is the "chief of the Tēci" and who successfully withstood the attacks of enemies on three occasions,'; 2. Aṭaikkalanāttucceṭṭiyar Vēḷān Ampalakküttan otherwise called Perran Vitviṭankan, 3. Vēlān Ampalakkuttan otherwise called Virakal Ja(na) vārappillai nāṭtuc Cettiyăr, 4. Tēvan utaiyan otherwise called Virakaḷ Cēnaṭṭuc - Ceṭṭiyar.; 5. Ceṭṭitēvan who as a warrior does not abandon the Annurruvar who had stood firm on three occasions (of attack), 6. Cōruṭai Appan, 7. Ariñcikulaiccān, the leader of those who carry commodities on their shoulders at Mantai, Kantan Ataimān, the senapati of the warriors of the Tacamati "one-hundred thousand", 8. Kaṇṭan Aṭaimān, the senāpati of the warriors of the Tacamaṭi "one-hundred thousand".; 9. Cenkanmälar otherwise called Piññan, 10. Virakaḷ (the hero) otherwise called Ilaviyāṇai, the "superintendent of streets"; 11. The leader of the Tēci, 12. Kaṇṭan Jayańkoṇṭān, the chief of the maṭikai, 13. Cēntan Etiraḷan-mallan otherwise called Tēcimatavāraṇam, 14. Cittan Cāttan, the senāpati of the Valanceyar otherwise called Vaḷañceyānṭān, 15. Kōṇan Mātavan who was also called Valankaiyāṇtān, 16. Paṭṭālakan Tēci otherwise called Mummatakkaḷiru, 17. Tēci Cankan otherwise called Viran irranan; 18. Māntai Ilancinkam otherwise called Vikkiramātittan of Akkacālai, 19. Kaṇapati Colan otherwise called Pittarā Muriparan.; As this veerampattinam became unstable because of paying an Indemnity, on promise, to Kuttipperumaḷ who was an enemy of the Teci, the nāṭṭuc ceṭṭis of "the eighteen countries" and we the Virakkoṭi and the swordsmen who render service (make this arrangement) so that the paṭṭinam will not perish. 'We pledge to protect this town and not to collect levies from the shops. The Virakkoṭi who are endowed with honours and privileges have set up this stone - slab inscription proclaiming the charter for the (re)-establishment of the (vira) paṭṭinam. Do not forget justice (aram)' — Translated by S. Pathmanathan,	Vahalkada slab inscription, 11th century AD

=== Viharehinna merchant inscription, Dambulla ===
Viharehinna merchant inscription
Background	Translation (English)	Inscription
Inscription set up within the premises of Viharehinna temple, Dambulla dating to the 12th century AD. It suggests that the Tamil merchant communities had established a reciprocal relationship with the Buddhist monastic establishment. The name of their merchant town - Tanmacākarap-pattinam - "ocean of dharma", is named after an epithet of the Buddha. The inscription records details pertaining to the Tamil merchants and their military associates.	'Hail Prosperity. The refuge of the entire world. The Viravalancevar possessing the long luminous and fiery spear, endowed with the edict of the Five Hundred Heroes, famous throughout the world because of their valour and whose faces are adorned by Laksmi are the offspring of the lineages of Sri Vasudeva, Khandhali and Mulabhadra. They observe steadfastly the noble law of the association (samayam) in the eighteen paṭṭinam (towns), the thirty-two vēḷāpuram (coastal towns) and the sixty-four katikati tāvaḷam (periodic fairs). They are the children of Paramēśvari of Aiya(p)polil who resides in all towns. The eighteen paṭṭinam, the thirty-two vēḷāpuram, the sixty four kaṭikait-tāvalam, the ceṭṭiputtirar (members of a community of traders), the Kavarai (a class of traders), the Kātripan (member of a class of traders), the Kāmunṭasvāmi (member of a class of soldiers), the oṭṭan (member of a community of traders), the pacumpaikkāran (he who carries the money bag), the ankakkaran (member of a class of soldiers), the āvanakkāran (member of vendors on the markets), the... vīran (hero), the pāvātai-virar, [heroes (endowed with the privilege of walking on) cloth spread], those who are proficient in Sanskrit and Tamil and those who ride donkeys which never falter, those who conduct their business in conformity with laws so as to enable the sceptre to be held forward prominently so that righteousness shall prevail and evil will disappear, with their fame spreading in all directions. All these are the Five Hundred of the thousand directions in the eighteen countries and the four quarters (of the earth). We, the heroes of the eighteen lands including Kanṭiyamuttar, attached to them (make this resolution): We have been greatly honoured by the perumakkal (governing body) of the Mācēnakamam otherwise called Tanmacākarap-pattinam. They secured the release of our companion Mutavaḷan Muttan otherwise called Nānātēciyāntān, who was arrested by Vēnāṭutaiyār and put in chains, after paying a ransom in money (āṭankācu). Besides, they have made silver amulets and presented them to us, and have named this town as eriviran-tanam after our company (kulappeyariṭṭu). We on our part have decided on reciprocal measures. We shall give up our right to collect lamp-oil and we as well as the nāṭṭucceṭṭis who have the right to collect money levies in this town shall not collect the fees hereafter and we promise this upon our heroic tradition... We may collect the daily maintenance (pakar coru) allowance and for clothing (pāvāṭai) four kācu according to prevailing custom. If any one unchivalrously violates this agreement, his post as well as the instrument of authority shall be confiscated and he shall be beaten all over his back and bone joints, and in case such a person dies of agony he will be given a dog's burial. Having thus agreed we planted the stone and the plank. (Attested by us) the patinenpūmi-vīrar. Tiralan... Varakālatara-kaṭṭiluḷḷa nāṭṭucceṭṭi, Tiralan Kampan otherwise called Pillaiccakala Nānātēci iṭṭa Munaivallapa Nāṇātēcik-kon, Nātan namviṭṭumuriyān, Kūttan Kālan otherwise called Nūrāyiran Tacamaṭi-mummata vāraṇappillai, Virakaḷ Murpērarayan Kuttan otherwise called Aññurruva-manṭila- ayirașṭănam, Pirān Cāttan otherwise called Cēnăpatiyānṭān, Kampan Villan otherwise called Cēnāpati Virakāḷai, Nāṭṭarayan Kannan Varuvan Ampalapilḷai-y-āṇtan, Tiruvarankan Eran otherwise called Tēciyāparaṇa-p-pillai. Forget not justice.' — Translated by S. Pathmanathan,	Viharehinna merchant inscription, 12th century AD

=== Kodaliparichan inscription of Vēḷaikkārar Mūvēntavēḷān in the years of Jayabahu I, Vavuniya ===
Kodaliparichan inscription in the years of Jayabahu I
Background	Translation (English)	Inscription
An inscription found near Mangkulam, Vavuniya District left by Vēḷaikkārar Mūvēntavēḷān dated to the 12th year of Jayabahu I (1122 or 1123 AD). The inscription records the Vēḷaikkārar warriors building a rest house, pond and well in the land granted to them.		Vavuniya Tamil inscription from 1122 AD

=== Kantaḷāy inscription in the years of Jayabahu I, Trincomalee ===
Kantaḷāy inscription in the years of Jayabahu I
Background	Translation (English)	Inscription
An inscription found at the Siva temple in Kantaḷāy, Trincomalee District dated to the 35th year of Jayabahu I (1145 AD). It records donations made to the temple by the ruling Gajabahu II, a staunch devotee of Siva. Jayabahu I's successors at Polonnaruwa dated their records in his regal years even after his demise. This is because none of his successors were formally consecrated as rulers til 1153 AD.	'In the 35th year of his Majesty (ko), the king of kings Sri Jayabāhu Tēvar, who had the title Abhaya Silamegha. He (Gajabahu II) deposited an amount of ten kācu (gold coins) for making food offerings at the time of the early morning waking - up ceremony at Vijayarāja - iśvaram, which was also called Sri Kailăsam at Vijayarāja(c) caturvvedimankalam otherwise called Kantaḷāy.' — Translated by S. Pathmanathan,	

=== Kantaḷāy gal āsana inscription, Trincomalee ===
Kantaḷāy gal āsana inscription, Trincomalee
Background	Translation (English)	Inscription
A Tamil inscription found in Kantaḷāy, Trincomalee District dating to the 11th or 12th century AD. The inscription is almost completely worn out, but appears to record an endowment by an unknown king.	The following words and phrases can be made out in this otherwise undecipherable record: ghee, lamp, arecanut, burnt lime, dry cultivation, tax, endowment, perpetual, cows, portion, elephants, horses and chariots, garland, city, having sold, of the place, having taken by force, warriors, to be high, kali, kaliyuga, who is not afraid of, having invited, north, land, thing, separate, roll, a measure — Translated by A. Veluppillai,	

=== Mankanay pillar inscription of Gajabahu II, Trincomalee ===
Mankanay pillar inscription of Gajabahu II, Trincomalee
Background	Translation (English)	Inscription
Pillar inscription from Mankanay, Trincomalee District dated to the 43rd regal year of Jayabahu I (1153 AD). It records a land grant made by Gajabahu II to a Vihara through his Tamil official Mintan Korran who wrote this inscription. An oath is sworn both in the name of the Buddha and Ganesha.	'Hail, prosperity. In the 43rd year of apaiya calāmēkavarmar cakkaravarttikaḷ Śrī Jayabāhu tēvar, perumāḷ Gajabāhu tēvar gave as a land grant to the ālvār of veykavēram (vihara), the fields called tel vecār and kiratu narato vecār, which were previously given to me, Mintan Korran, the superintendent of palanquin bearers attached to the palace, as maintenance land, and the lands adjacent to their four boundaries. In respect of this King's order (recorded) in the entry, Mānāparaṇa tēvar sent (us) a royal order proclaiming that it was an act of Gajabāhu tēvar. On the receipt of that order this inscription has been set up. Those who cause impediments to this grant shall be in hell. This oath sworn with reference to the Buddha. The oath is sworn with reference to the God Vallavar (Ganapati)' — Translated by S. Pathmanathan,	Mankanay Pillar inscription of Gajabahu II - 12th century AD

=== Mayilankulam Vēḷaikkārar inscription in the years of Jayabahu I, Trincomalee ===
Mayilankulam Vēḷaikkārar inscription in the years of Jayabahu I
Background	Translation (English)	Inscription
Slab inscription found in Mayilankulam, Trincomalee District dating to the 18th year of Jayabahu I (1128 AD). It was left by Kanavati (Ganapati), the leader of the Vēḷaikkārar army and an agent of the ruling Vikramabahu I (1111–1132 AD). It records a Buddhist temple (perumpaḷḷi/mahavihara) being put under the custody of the Tamil Vēḷaikkārar soldiers.	'In the eighteenth year of his Majesty 'Emperor' Sri Jayabahu devar, Kanavati, the commander of the army (tanṭanātaṇār), who had a tenure for life (tammāna jivitam) named (the temple) after the army of the Vēḷaikkārar of the four divisions (nārpaṭai) garrisoned at Katturai. Vikkirama Calāmēkan Perumpaḷḷi is to be under the custody of the Vēḷaikkārar.' — Translated by S. Pathmanathan,	Mayilankulam Velaikkarar inscription of Jayabahu I - 12th century AD

=== Budumuttava pillar inscriptions in the years of Jayabahu I, Kurunegala ===
Budumuttava pillar inscriptions in the years of Jayabahu I
Background	Translation (English)	Inscription
Two pillar inscriptions from Budumuttava, Kurunegala District dating to 1118-9 AD in the regnal years of Jayabahu I. The locality at the time was under the control of Manabharana who is identified in the inscription as Virapperumal, the prince of Pandya lineage. His mother Mitta (the sister to Vijayabahu I, and grandmother of Parakramabahu I) was married to a Pandya prince as recorded in the Culavamsa. Manabharana's consort Cundhamalli was the daughter of Kulottunga I suggesting close and friendly relations with the Cholas in the early years of the 12th century AD. This first inscription records a donation made by her to a Hindu temple. The second inscription records a caste dispute between blacksmiths and washermen being resolved by Manabharana's intervention. It was engraved on the orders of Mākkalingam Kanavati, a Tamil official in the presence of fellow Sinhala officials.	'In the eighth year of his Majesty Jayabāhu tēvar, Cuntamalli, the consort of (prince) (Pāṇṭiyaṉār) Virapperumāḷ and a daughter of Kulottunkacola tēvar granted to the temple of Vikkirama calāmēka - iśvaram at Vikkiramacalamēkapuram a standing lamp of alloyed metal (tarānilai viḷakku) of two spans in length and ten kācu (gold coins) for burning it as a perpetual lamp.' 'Hail Prosperity! On the fourth day of the first half of (the month) of (Pankuṇi) (March–April), in the eighth year of the "Emperor" Apaiya Calāmēkan Sri Jayabahu Tēvar. The "five dignitaries" of Sri Virabāhu devar conducted an inquiry about former custom and having found that the blacksmiths had to be supplied with kottacaḷu, foot-clothes and clothes for covering the faces of dead persons, sent for the washermen, and made them perform the (customary) services.... Our Lord, the illustrious Virabāhu devar. I Mākkalińkam Kaṇavati caused this inscription to be engraved. Damaran Bhoruvēsi Pay(a)tānki Kallänāvan having caused (this) to be executed, Dāmāra Puruvesi Kācampaṇtārattuḷ and I, Kaḷaccukuḷi Kummaracēna Nampaṇan alias Vijāyābaranan (attest this writing) This is my writing.' — Translated by S. Pathmanathan,	Budumuttava pillar inscriptions of Jayabahu I - 12th century AD

=== Puliyankulam pillar inscription of Jayabahu I, Anurādhapura ===
Puliyankulam pillar inscription of Jayabahu I
Background	Translation (English)	Inscription
Tamil Pillar inscription found at Puliyankulam, Anuradhapura District, recording a donation of land to a Buddhist shrine. It is dated to the 12th century AD possibly in the regnal years of Jayabahu I.	'In the 4th year of (Jayabā)hu dēvar, we-(Kumaran Cantirama. and..ti[raiya]n.. natalvan (Ala)kar tevan have granted... land to Buddha Mahadēvar of the Buddha Mahā(vikāram).' — Translated by S. Pathmanathan,	

=== Rankot Vihara Velaikkaran inscription of Jayabahu I, Polonnaruwa ===
Rankot Vihara Velaikkaran inscription of Jayabahu I
Background	Translation (English)	Inscription
Inscription found close to the Rankot Vihara, Polonnaruwa issued by a Tamil warrior chief serving under Jayabahu I.	'The Vēḷaikkāran Caturyan, the chieftain of Malaimaṇṭalam who is an agent of his Majesty Ceyapāku tēvar, who subdued, in battle, seven hundred leagues of Ilam.' — Translated by S. Pathmanathan,	Rankot Vihara Velaikkaran inscription of Jayabahu I - 12th century

=== Mailawewa Vēḷaikkārar pillar inscription, Trincomalee ===
Mailawewa Vēḷaikkārar pillar inscription, Trincomalee
Background	Translation (English)	Inscription
Tamil pillar inscription found in Mailawewa, Gomarankadawala, Trincomalee District located close to a Buddhist monastery.	The inscription records about a Buddhist monastery built and maintained by the Tamil Vēḷaikkārar army during the reign of Vikramabahu I.	

=== Moragahavela inscription in the reign of Gajabahu II, Polonnaruwa ===
Moragahavela inscription in the reign of Gajabahu II, Polonnaruwa
Background	Translation (English)	Inscription
Pillar inscription at Moragahavela, Tammankaduva dated in the 28th year of Jayabahu I (1138 AD), and in the reign of Gajabahu II. It records a donation of land by a Tamil Vēḷaikkārar soldier to a Buddhist monastery.	'In the 28th year of Je(ya)bāhu tēvar, this land of the extent of one vēli at the village of Pātālāy, which has been given to me on service tenure, has been given to the monastery of the Buddha by me, Ulakāyakittaṇ. If any one violates this act of merit he would incur the sin of destroying "the three kōyils". He would incur the sin of violating the codes of (the army of) the three arms. If any one covets this land he would incur the sin of coveting his own mother"' — Translated by S. Pathmanathan,	Moragahavela inscription of Gajabahu II - 12th century AD

=== Mahakirindegama pillar inscription in the reign of Gajabahu II, Anurādhapura ===
Mahakirindegama pillar inscription in the reign of Gajabahu II, Anurādhapura
Background	Translation (English)	Inscription
Pillar inscriptions from Mahakirindegama, Anuradhapura District dating to the reign of Gajabahu II in 1133/4 AD. It records a grant of land and fields to Brahmins of a Hindu temple.	'Hail Prosperity. The 24th year of Jayabāhu devar. He bought the fields (vayal) and lands of the category of yattālai, which were (formerly) lost by Jayankonṭa Calāmēka Caturvvētimankalam, from Vallapar and granted them to the Brahmins. He gave them (also) the right to irrigate their fields and three units of land called yattālai by drawing from the tank the same amount of water as in the past. Those who violate this endowment shall be born in hell at the end of the cycle of births. This oath (is sworn) in the name of God Vallabha (Gaṇēsa)' — Translated by S. Pathmanathan,	Mahakirindegama pillar inscription of Jayabahu I - 12th century AD

=== Hingurakdamana pillar inscription in the reign of Gajabahu II, Polonnaruwa ===
Hingurakdamana pillar inscription in the reign of Gajabahu II, Polonnaruwa
Background	Translation (English)	Inscription
Pillar inscription from Hingurakdamana, Polonnaruwa District dated to 1150 AD. It records an endowment made to a Buddhist vihara by a Tamil soldier serving under Gajabahu II.	'In the 40th year (of His Majesty), I.Umpila Ayittan of the group of Akampaṭis of Gajabāhu Tēvar, sold an amanam from the land given to me as life - tenure (Jivitam) at Mānanālāy and donated (the proceeds) to the Buddhasthāna at Pātoṇi-mācār. Those who violate this (endowment will be committing an act of sacrilege against the Buddhasthāna and shall enter hell.' — Translated by S. Pathmanathan,	Hingurakdamana pillar inscription in the reign of Gajabahu II - 12th century AD

=== Kantaḷāy pillar inscriptions of Gajabahu II, Trincomalee ===
Kantaḷāy pillar inscriptions of Gajabahu II
Background	Translation (English)	Inscription
Two Tamil pillar inscriptions set up on the order of Gajabahu II as boundary markers in two different localities in Kantaḷāy, Trincomalee District.	'Hail prosperity. (This) stone was set up by Kilivai Apimaparaman, "The army leader of Lanka", at the eastern boundary of Kantaḷāy, which was trampled by the female elephant, on the order of Gajabāhu devar, the "lord of Lanka".' 'Hail Prosperity. This stone (was) planted at Itaiyarkal as a boundary marker between villages, on the ground trampled by the female elephant, on the order of Gajabahu devar, the ruler of Lanka.' — Translated by S. Pathmanathan,	Kantaḷāy pillar inscriptions of Gajabahu II

=== Polonnaruwa pillar inscription of Gajabahu II ===
Polonnaruwa pillar inscription of Gajabahu II
Background	Translation (English)	Inscription
Fragmentary Tamil inscription recording an endowment made to a Buddhist temple by a Tamil called Atittamahadevan. It dates to 1148 AD in the reign of Gajabahu II.	'In the month of cittirai (April–May) during the 15th year since Gajabāhutēvar assumed authority over the government of the kingdom, which was the 38th year (since the consecration) of Jayabahutēvar, Ātittamahātēvan (deposited...). On the income from this amount of 102 kācu shall be supplied (clarified butter) at the rate of one uri per day for each kācu (...at the shrines) of the Puttatēvar and Vērattāḷvār of the paḷḷi of Pulainari otherwise called Vijayarājapuram. If any one among those who have received this deposit misuses it he shall suffer the sin of transgressing royal orders"' — Translated by S. Pathmanathan,	

=== Galtampitiya Virakkoṭi inscription ===
Galtampitiya Virakkoṭi inscription
Background	Translation (English)	Inscription
Fragmentary inscription left by Virakkoṭi merchants in Galtampitiya. The contents suggests that the Virakkoṭi were worsted in a skirmish and arrested by some foes. They were then released on the intervention of the authorities of the virapaṭṭinam (merchant town). The letters 'Pāṇ' following the word prince suggests a ruler of Pandya lineage such as Manabharana (the cousin of Parakramabahu I) was ruling at the time.	The inscription has similarities with other Virakkoṭi inscriptions, but is considerably worn out and cannot be fully translated.	Galtampitiya Virakkoṭi inscription - 12th century AD

=== Nainativu Tamil inscription of Parakramabahu I, Jaffna ===
Nainativu Tamil inscription of Parakramabahu I (1153–1186 A.D.)
Background	Translation (English)	Inscription
Parakramabahu I (1153–1186 A.D) issued an edict addressed to his local Tamil officials in Jaffna, advising them on how to deal with shipwrecked foreign traders.	'.............we................that foreigners should come and stay at Urathurai, that they should be protected, and that foreigners from many ports should come and gather in our port; as we like elephants and horses, if the vessels which bring elephants and horses unto us get wrecked, a fourth share of the cargo should be taken by the Treasury and the other three parts should be left to the owner; and, if vessels laden with merchandise get wrecked an exact half should be taken by the Treasury and the other exact half should be left to the owner. This regulation shall be enforced as long as the sun and moon last. This regulation was caused to be inscribed on stone as well as copper. This regulation was framed and issued by Deva Parakramabhujo who is like a wild conflagration unto the dynasty of enemy kings, the overlord of all Sinhala............framed and issued this regulation.' — Translated by K. Indrapala,	Parakramabahu I (1153–1186 A.D.) Nainativu Tamil inscription

=== Panduvasnuvara inscription of Nissanka Malla ===
Panduvasnuvara inscription of Nissanka Malla
Background	Translation (English)	Inscription
Tamil inscription from Panduwasnuwara in the reign of Nissanka Malla (1192 AD), recording his establishment of a Buddhist monastic school (pirivena).	'In the fifth year of Parākramapāhu Niccankamallar, the King of Ilankai in the South, the Parākrama atikāri, vanuvēri, the vanquisher of the Five (Pāṇtiyar), a repository of strength and wisdom, who was a grandson of the cenevinātan (sēnāpati) Mēnai, established with pleasure the parākrama atikārip pirivuna to flourish at the town of Sripura nakar so that these-the beautiful temple (kōyil) of the exalted ascetic (munivar) who attained enlightenment, the monastery (alayam), the splendid street exhuming the odour of honey and the cavittam-would become pre-eminent, on the occasion when the sun had gone into the zodiac Capricorn on ponnavantinam (Thursday), which is the seventh day of the fortnight, in the month of Tai (Jan-Feb), the nakşatra being Uttiraṭṭāti.' — Translated by S. Pathmanathan,	Panduvasnuvara inscription of Nissanka Malla - 12th century AD

=== Jetavana Nānādesi bronze image, Anurādhapura ===
Jetavana Nānādesi bronze image, Anurādhapura
Background	Translation (English)	Inscription
Bronze image of the Nānādesi merchants found in Jetavana, Anuradhapura with a Tamil inscription reading śri nāṇātēciyan dating to the late 12th century AD. Queen Lilavati made an arrangement with the Nānādesi merchants for the maintenance of an alms-hall in Anuradhapura. The same merchants also obtained from the Queen the right to establish and administer a settlement called Madhigaya.	The expression 'śri nāṇātēciyan' is engraved on the pedestal of the image. The first letter is in Grantha while all others are in Tamil characters of the late 12th century. The inscription, which is engraved in the form of a label, suggests that this particular image was presented to a shrine by the Nānādesis who had a major share in the internal and foreign trade of the island during this period. — Translated by S. Pathmanathan,	śri nāṇātēciyan, 12th century AD

=== Ridiyegama Nānādesi Bronze seal, Hambantota ===
Ridiyegama Nānādesi Bronze seal, Hambantota
Background	Translation (English)	Inscription
A bronze seal of the Nānādesi merchants from Hambantota dating to the 12th century AD.	'The inscription engraved in an admixture of Tamil and Grantha characters reads nānādesin sakai, a compound of two expressions.' — Translated by S. Pathmanathan,	Nanadesi bronze seal, 12th century AD Nanadesi bronze seal, 12th century AD

== Transitional period (1215–1619 AD) ==
=== Gomarankadawala rock inscription of Magha, Trincomalee ===
Gomarankadawala inscription of Magha, Trincomalee
Background	Translation (English)	Inscription
Tamil inscription from Gomarankadawala, Trincomalee District recording the consecration of Kalinga Magha by a representative of Kulothunga Chola III dating to the early 13th century AD.	The inscription records grants made to a nearby temple, which now lies in ruins. A person called Kalingarayan is stated to have left the inscription, and is claimed to have conquered Ila-mandalam (Lanka) and carried out the consecration of Gangaraja Kalinga Vijayabahu Devar (Magha). — Translated by K. Indrapala,	Gomarankadawala inscription of Magha

=== Thampalakamam Slab inscription of Magha, Trincomalee ===
Thampalakamam Slab inscription of Magha, Trincomalee
Background	Translation (English)	Inscription
Slab inscription from Thampalakamam, Trincomalee District issued by an official of Kalinga Magha dating to the 13th century AD. It records the conversion of the village into a merchant town.	'As decided by Māgha uṭaiyār the village of Tampalakāmam has been converted into a habitation of Jagatappakantan tāṇam. The boundaries of the (vīra) taḷam shall be the four boundaries of Tampalakāmam.' — Translated by S. Pathmanathan,	Thampalakamam inscription of Magha, 13th century AD

=== Rankot Vihara Vēḷaikkāran Matevan inscription, Polonnaruwa ===
Rankot Vihara Vēḷaikkāran Matevan inscription
Background	Translation (English)	Inscription
Late 13th century Tamil inscription found in the premises of Rankot Vihara issued by a Tamil Vēḷaikkārar soldier named Mātēvan. He was appointed a chieftain of a territorial division in Polonnaruwa by Nanti Kirincatan, an invader with connections to the Western Gangas.	'I, Vēḷaikkāran Mātēvan, who is serving as the executor of orders (āṇatti) and who maintains the records (ōlaikkaran), have been appointed as the chieftain of a mangalam (a territorial division) with the title Uttamacolan by Nanti Kiriñcatan who has the following epithets : kuvalalapura paramēśvaran, kankai kulottaman and kāvēri-vallavar. Any one who violates this arrangement or insists that I should agree to surrender it on my death will witness the honour of his wife being violated.' — Translated by S. Pathmanathan,	Rankot Vihara Vēḷaikkāran Matevan inscription - 13th century AD

=== Villunti Kantucuvami Koyil inscription of Buddhapriya, Trincomalee ===
Villunti Kantucuvami Koyil inscription of Buddhapriya
Background	Translation (English)	Inscription
A late 13th century inscription from a Skanda temple in Trincomalee left by a Tamil Buddhist agent of the Pandya dynasty. It records the setting up of a pillar of victory at the entrance hall of a temple and is written in both Tamil and Sanskrit.	'Buddhapriya of the golden Karacai and the great Madurai set up the pillar of victory at the entrance - hall (mukamantapam) established as a reciprocal measure of gratitude to the (God represented by the) Vēl adorned with (garlands of) flowers for granting to the King the favour of victory.' — Translated by S. Pathmanathan,	Villunti Kantucuvami Koyil inscription of Buddhapriya - 13th century AD

=== Welikanda Ainnurruvar slab inscription ===
Welikanda Ainnurruvar slab inscription
Background	Translation (English)	Inscription
An inscription from Welikanda recording the establishment of a Buddhist temple (perumpaḷḷi) by the Ainnurruvar Tamil merchant community. It dates to the 13th century A.D.	'Hail Prosperity. The perumpaḷḷi of the Annurruvar of the thousand directions.' — Translated by S. Pathmanathan,	Welikanda Ainnurruvar inscription, 13th century AD

=== Dediyamulla Virakkoti slab inscription, Kurunegala ===
Dediyamulla Virakkoti slab inscription
Background	Translation (English)	Inscription
One of the six heroic charters pertaining to the merchant towns established by the Ainnurruvar. Three are from the Kurunegala District. This inscription records a reciprocal agreement between the town council and the Virakkoti, who are also have said to have donated to a Buddhist shrine (lokapperum chettiyar is taken as an appellation of the Buddha.) It dates to the 13th century AD.		Dediyamulla Virakkoti slab inscription, 13th century AD

=== Mahiyalla Tamil inscription, Kurunegala ===
Mahiyalla Tamil inscription
Background	Translation (English)	Inscription
15 line Tamil inscription found in Mahiyalla, Kurunegala District. It is dated to the 13th century AD and thought to be left by a Tamil silk trader.	Many of the letters are worn out. The 3rd line mentions Kurunakal, (Kurunegala). the 4th line mentions cavayil (in the assembly). The word pattu (silk) is mentioned multiple times. The 8th line refers to ilai ven pattu (beautifully woven white silk). The last line mentions Atityavarman, a silk trader. The name of Rama is invoked at the end of the inscription suggesting a Vaishnava affiliation. — Translated by A. Veluppillai,	

=== Perilamaiyar inscriptions of Padaviya ===
Perilamaiyar inscriptions of Padaviya
Background	Translation (English)	Inscription
Inscriptions from Padaviya issued by the Perilamaiyar, a Tamil agricultural community. They record endowments made to a Hindu temple and are dated to the late 13th century.	'Hail prosperity. Those who recite the name of Vicaiyarama -p pērilamaiyar a thousand times at Valakali, the temple of Uttamar (Siva) at the new and prosperous (town of) Pati, with their minds absorbed in the performance of religious observances, daily, will attain the wealth equivalent to that acquired by those who wander up to the extremities of all directions.' 'Hail prosperity. The Iḷamaiyār of Kilaiccēri, who belongs to the group of Vicaiyarāma-p- pērilḷamaiyār made an endowment for providing cooked offerings daily at the three sessions of worship (at the temple of Nāṇātēci Vitankar of the veerampattinam, which is known as Aipolil.' — Translated by S. Pathmanathan,	Perilamaiyar inscriptions of Padaviya - 13th century AD

=== Fragmentary inscription from Anurādhapura museum ===
Fragmentary inscription from Anurādhapura museum
Background	Translation (English)	Inscription
Fragmentary inscription recording an endowment made by a merchant to a Siva temple.	'The accomplished (vittakan) Irāman Pujankan otherwise called Vijayālaya Vallapan, the merchant who is a lover of the temple(s) of Siva.' — Translated by S. Pathmanathan,	Fragmentary inscription from Anuradhapura museum - 13th century AD

(The following three Sanskrit inscriptions have been included for completion, as they were issued by Tamils.)

=== Padaviya Sanskrit bronze seal ===
Padaviya Sanskrit bronze seal
Background	Translation (English)	Inscription
Bronze seal issued by a Siva temple in Padaviya dated to the 13th century and inscribed in Grantha script.	'Hail prosperity. This inscription is issued by Mahesa, who has his abode at Sripati-grāma inhabited by the twice-born, and whose feet are adorned by the diadems of Indra and other (god)s.' — Translated by S. Pathmanathan,	Padaviya Sanskrit bronze seal

=== Vēḷaikkārar Sanskrit Buddhist inscription of Padaviya ===
Vēḷaikkārar Sanskrit Buddhist inscription of Padaviya
Background	Translation (English)	Inscription
Sanskrit inscription issued in Padaviya under the reign of the Arya Chakravarti dynasty (Setu family) in the late 13th century. It records a Vihara being built in Padaviya by a Tamil Buddhist general named Lokanatha.	'The Setu family is established in the Buddha dharma, which is unblemished, exalted with many virtues and is adorned with the triple gems (Buddha, Dhamma and the Sangha). This vihara, glorious with beauty and splendour, with its spire adorned with gems and caused to be built here at Sripati (grāma) by the general named Lokanātha, has been named after the (regiment of) Vēḷaikkārar and placed under their protection. Hail Prosperity.' — Translated by S. Pathmanathan,	

=== Sanskrit inscription of Codaganga from Trincomalee ===
Sanskrit inscription of Codaganga from Trincomalee
Background	Translation (English)	Inscription
Fragmentary Sanskrit inscription from the Koneswaram temple, Trincomalee issued in the name of Codaganga. He is identified with Kulakkottan who is recorded in the chronicles of the temple as also having the name Cholakankan (Codaganga). The inscription is dated to the 13th century AD.	'Hail Prosperity! Deva Śri Codaganga, secured dominion over the unconquerable Lanka, the forehead ornament of the Earth, through the sport of war. On the occasion of the ritual of flower offering at Gokarna when the nakșatra Hasta was ascendant the sun was in the Mesha lagna...' — Translated by S. Pathmanathan,	Sanskrit inscription of Codaganga from Trincomalee - 13th century AD

=== Fragmentary inscription from Periyapuliyankulam, Vavuniya ===
Fragmentary inscription from Periyapuliyankulam
Background	Translation (English)	Inscription
Fragmentary Tamil inscription found in Periyapuliyankulam, Vavuniya District dated to the late 13th century AD.	'This order is the order of the three tanam. This is sworn in the name of Vallavaraiyan (God Ganesa). Those who destroy this (arrangement) will enter hell.' — Translated by S. Pathmanathan,	Periyapuliyankulam inscription - 13th century AD

=== Kankuveli inscription, Trincomalee ===
Kankuveli inscription, Trincomalee
Background	Translation (English)	Inscription
Inscription from Kankuveli village, Trincomalee District dating to the 14th century AD. It records a land grant to the God of Konanāthar by the ruling Vanniyar chieftains and their officers from seven villages. The concluding part of the record mentions Mudalimar, Thānaththār and Varippattu as witnesses to the grant.	'The Vanniyar of Trincomalee and the seven headmen or the Adipanars of the village of Kankuveli have dedicated this field and other advantages to be derived from that village to their God Konainathan. Whomever intrudes on this gift or takes any of these advantages to himself will grieviously sin. This dedication was confirmed in the presence of two priests of the castes, Eanam and Warrallepattoem...'	

=== Kotagama slab inscription of Arya Chakravarti, Kegalle ===
Kotagama slab inscription of Arya Chakravarti
Background	Translation (English)	Inscription
The Kotagama inscription found in Kegalle District is a record of victory left by the Aryacakravarti dynasty of the Jaffna Kingdom in western Sri Lanka (14th century AD). 'Anurai' is derived from Anuradhapura and is a term used to describe all capitals of the Sinhala kingdom.	'The women folk of lords of Anurai who did not submit to Ariyan of Cinkainakar of foaming and resounding waters shed tears from eyes that glinted like spears and performed the rites of pouring water with gingerly seed from their bejeweled lotus like hands."' — Translated by C. Rasanayagam,	Kotagama inscription as displayed in the National Museum of Colombo, Sri Lanka in December 2011 Kotagama Tamil inscription - 14th century AD

=== Kailayanathar temple inscription, Jaffna ===
Kailayanathar temple inscription
Background	Translation (English)	Inscription
The Kailayanathar temple inscription found in Nallur, Jaffna dates to the 14th century and records a donation of one mā of land to the temple. It was given for the merit of Tirumalainathar by ...ndarampillai (first part of name illegible). According to the Kailayamalai chronicle the temple was built by the first Arya Chakravarti king and was a magnificent temple of large dimensions. It was later destroyed by the Portuguese, and this inscription was found in 2011 on a stone in Nallur.		Kailayanathar temple inscription, 14th century AD

=== Lankatilaka Vihara inscription of Bhuvanaikabahu IV ===
Lankatilaka Vihara inscription of Bhuvanaikabahu IV
Background	Translation (English)	Inscription
In the 14th century, a record inscribed in Sinhala on the walls of the Lankatilaka Vihara was provided with a full Tamil translation on the same walls. It is the longest of all Tamil inscriptions found in Sri Lanka and was issued in the reign of Bhuvanaikabahu IV of Gampola (1344-1354 AD). Both inscriptions register the grant of extensive fields and donations to the Buddhist shrine.	'Hail! Prosperity! Whereas our minister, Senā-Langādigārigal (Sena-Lanka-adhikara), intimated to us that an endowment should be assigned to this, so that this illustrious great vihāra should continue to exist in the future, (the lands for its) maintenance caused to be granted to this shrine by us are as follows :- An allotment of field one yāla (in sowing extent) in the village named Kirivavulai in the district of Cinguruvāṇai; an allotment of field, six yālas (in sowing extent) in New Vadalagodai, which has been established by constructing a dam anew and the digging of channels by us, our chiefs (mudaligal) and the people (acting) together; an allotment of field five yālas (in sowing extent) at Old Vadalagodai; amounting to allotments of field of twelve yālas (in sowing extent) and comprising the forests, gardens, including mango and tamarind trees, and sites for houses within the four boundaries of these villages; an allotment of field one yala (in sowing extent) in the two villages called Cittāvullai and Konvānikkai, caused to be granted, from among the estates which belong to him as inherited villages, by Senā-Langādigārigal; an allotment of field one yāla (in sowing extent) in the field called Yagāllai in Old Vadalagodai, caused to be granted by Vacādigarigal; an allotment of field, one yāla (in sowing extent), in the village called Kasambiliyagodai, caused to be granted by Satruvan-padi-rāyar; an allotment of field, one yala (in sowing extent), in Nārangodai, caused to be granted by Lord Divānā; an allotment of field, twelve amanas (in sowing extent), in Delgottai, caused to be granted by Jayacinga-padi rāyar; a forest called Vidiyela, for supplying oil for sacred lamps, caused to be granted from the Sandānā forest; an allotment of field one yāla (in sowing extent) in Kodavelai, which has been established by the construction of a dam and the digging of channels by the people of the Cinguruvānai district acting together, thus the fields caused to be granted to this shrine by us, our chiefs (mudaligal) and the people together total in extent to seventeen yālas and twelve amanas; these lands, free of taxes, comprising the forests, the gardens including coconut, cappu, mango and tamarind (trees), and sites for houses in the villages within their four bounds ries, were caused to be granted. By Senā-Langādigarigal himself, have been caused to be granted to this shrine, utensils for religious worship made of gold, silver, bronze, iron and other metals, and two hundred slaves from among the male slaves and female slaves comprising the slaves that he had (received as dowry) at marriage, and those that he had purchased by paying money; and four hundred head of cattle including neat cattle and buffaloes from herds of bulls and calves. And for the purpose of conducting the sacred services, for offerings of food, for lamps, for garlands, for dances, for audiences and other observances-for the continuance of these-for robes and ornaments for the maintenance of these, to the Omniscient Lord (Buddha) who has been graciously pleased to manifest Himself and remain in this illustrious vihāra, and to the abodes of divinities to these in the shrine thus established, the inhabitants of the realm have all joined together and pledged themselves to pay one panam a year from each house every year, since the shrine has been given the name Lankātilagam - the name of all the inhabitants of the realm. Accordingly, we and the chiefs (mudaligal) assembled together and having spoken (to that effect made order that it is obligatory to exact this impost even by having seized the earthen vessels (of the household), by taking away gold and jewellery, by seizing them or by (placing people) in restraint. We also, having assembled and fixed as a matter concerning the computation of dues that, from the outer customs house and from the inner customs-house, there shall be levied a quarter per cent of the value of merchandise from various countries brought by merchants coming through the nine seaports from the eighteen countries, and having caused (this decision) to be engraved on copper, granted (such dues to the shrine). All incomes derived from the endowments thus granted shall be divided into five shares, out of which three shares will go to the Three Jewels, namely the Buddha, Dharma and Sangha, one share to the go and one share to a kinsman or descendant of Senā-Langādigārigal, who, baving appeared in his linkage, protects this charity and is engaged in the performance of the sacred services-so it has been ordained. In order that this charity may last as long as the moon and the sun, this order was written on copper as well as stone, and granted. In this manner shall every one accept (this order) with gratification. Apart from any loss caused unintentionally, those sinners who, out of deceitful or evil intention, having spoken against this charity, either out of greed for the properties belonging to this shrine, or due to violence, confiscate and take it for themselves, will be burnt in the one hundred and thirty-six hells, and will be unable to see the limit thereof; they will be born as fiends, various classes of beasts and asuras, and suffer torment for a long time; they will become inferior even to the five candala castes, and will become more degraded even than creatures including crows and dogs; they will be born among the eighty-four million classes of animals, at the end of whom is the ant and at the head is the elephant, and will not see the limit of such existence; they will not be able to see Maitreya, the Omniscient One. On the other hand, those persons of virtuous actions, who, even by a mere word, support this charity and protect it, will obtain the affluence of the six celestial worlds, the affluence of a great universal monarch, the affluence of a territorial magnate in the world of men, the affluence of Brahmas or the affluence of Maras, and in the end shall realise the abundance of Liberation which is called the great cessation into Immortality. And the founder of this charity, Senā-Langadhigārigal, for the sake of protecting this, makes an exhortation in this manner. Whoever may be that virtuous person who, even by a mere word, supports and sustains this charity, the dust on the two feet of that noble personage, the excellent minister called Senā-Langadhigarigal places on his head as if it were a fragrant flower. This pre-eminent minister endowed with fortune of diverse sorts, for the sake of the protection of this charitable foundation bearing the name of Langādilaga, which is (adorned in) diverse manner by images and paintings, with hands placed together on his head, having the fingers thereof illuminated by the lustre of the ten nails, beseeches therefor kings who are flourishing at present as well as kings who would appear in the future, ministers who exist at present and ministers who will come in the future, and also citizens who flourish at present and citizens who will come in the future.' — Translated by Senarat Paranavithana,	Lankatilaka Vihara inscription of Bhuvanaikabahu IV - 14th century AD

=== Galle trilingual inscription of Zheng He ===
Galle trilingual inscription of Zheng He
Background	Translation (English)	Inscription
A stone tablet with an inscription in three languages, Chinese, Tamil and Persian. It is dated to 15 February 1409 and was installed by the Chinese admiral Zheng He in Galle during his grand voyages. The Tamil inscription records an endowment made to the Vishnu temple of Dondra (Lord Tenavarai Nayanar).	'Hail! ..The great king of Cina, the supreme overlord of kings, the full-orbed moon in splendour, having heard of the fame of the Lord, presents [the following] as offerings, in the hands of the envoys Cimvo and Uvincuvin to the sacred presence of the Lord Tenavarai Nayanar in the kingdom of Ilanga. (And he also) causes this utterance to be heard. 'All living beings who exist in this world are being protected, in happiness, by the compassion of the Lord. Men, whencesoever they come thither, have their obstacles [to happiness] removed through the divine grace of the Lord of Tenavarai. So, [the following] are presented as offerings to the Lord of Tenavarai; to wit, gold, silver, tulukki, silk, sandalwood and oil for anointing. The various offerings in detail, are:- one thousand kalancus of gold, five thousand kalancus of silver, fifty pieces of tulukki of different colours, four pairs of banners embroidered with gold thread and (adorned with crystal?) two pairs of the same red in colour, five copper vessels of antique copper for keeping incense, five black stands, ten copper vases for holding flowers, ten black stands, five wick-holders for standing brass lamps, five black stands, six pairs of lotus flowers made of wood and gilt, five gilt caskets for putting agil in, ten pairs of wax candles, two thousand five hundred katti of oil and ten pieces of sandalwood. These included in the list as enumerated are given as offerings to the sacred presence of the Lord Tenavarai Nayanar.' — Translated by Senarat Paranavithana,	Galle trilingual inscription, 1409 AD

=== Munnesvaram inscription of Parakramabahu VI ===
Munnesvaram inscription of Parakramabahu VI
Background	Translation (English)	Inscription
Munneswaram temple inscription recording a grant of land and money to the temple and priests by King Parakramabahu VI (1412-1467 AD).	'Let there be happiness and prosperity: The king of kings and 'Emperor of the three worlds', Sri Sangha bodi Parakramabahu déver of the solar dynasty who is (like) the serpent to (the king) Pararājasekharan adores the lotus like feet of the Buddha. In the 10th day of the waxing moon of the month of arpaci (October–November) in the 38th year of his reign His majesty invited the chief priests who propitiate the God of munnēsvaram and inquired of the affairs of the temple from the (learned) Purðhita(r) called vijasamagava panditar and endowed the lands in the temple district of munnēsvaram which formerly belonged to the priests as temple land. For the performance of worship, he granted to the priests, 22 amanam of field at Illuppa(i) deni(ya) and to the chief priests, 30 amanam of field at kōttaippitti and 8 amaram of field at Tittakkatai with the inhabited localities and forests attached to them. (Moreover), he provided for the (daily) offering of three measures of cooked rice, curry, betel and incense and a monthly grant of 30 panam to the chief priests and 11 panam for each of the priests to be enjoyed in perpetuity (till the sun and the moon endure) and from generation to generation as a gift free of all taxes. Those who cause any obstruction to this grant will incur the sin of committing the five most heinous crimes while those who support it will attain the position of the sun. This proclamation has been issued by Paräkrama (bahu) through the grace of the lord of Munneswaram, the lord of all beings and the ocean of the knowledge of saivism.' — Translated by S. Pathmanathan,	Munneswaram inscription of Parakramabahu VI (1412-1467 AD)

=== Fragmentary Jaffna inscription of Parakramabahu VI ===
Fragmentary Jaffna inscription of Parakramabahu VI
Background	Translation (English)	Inscription
Fragmentary Tamil inscription of Parakramabahu VI (1410-1467 AD) in Jaffna. His adopted son Sapumal Kumaraya had conquered the Jaffna Kingdom in 1450 AD and ruled it as a vassal state for 17 years. His name is still mentioned in prayers at the Nallur Kandaswamy Temple which he rebuilt.	'Sri Sanghabodhi-varmar, Tribhuvana-chakravarti (the emperor of the three worlds) Sri Parakramabahu Tevar...In the year....opposite to that of...' — Translated by S. Pathmanathan,	

=== Naimmana inscription of Parakramabahu VI, Matara ===
Naimmana inscription of Parakramabahu VI
Background	Translation (English)	Inscription
Tamil inscription of Parakramabahu VI found in Naimmana village, Matara District. It records a grant of fields in Naimmana to feed Brahmins at the alms hall near the shrine of Devinuwara. It is dated to 1433 AD.	'On the fifth of the first fortnight of Vaikāci in the year opposite the 20th year of Sri Parakramabāhu dēvar the anniversary of the raising of the glorious umbrella by the great king. To the alms-hall which carries on daily in the sacred presence of the king (i.e., the officers of the king) the village of Nāymmanai and the gardens and fields including Sungankola, Pagala karamullai and Verduvai (were given). Be it known that these are to last as long as the Moon and the Sun last. Should there be any person who have thought of anything detrimental to this they would suffer the consequences of the sin of having slain cows and Brahmins on (the banks of) the Ganges. Those, who shall cause the maintenance of this, will obtain heaven and final liberation. For the maintenance permanently of charity towards twelve Brahmins at the alms-hall of the illustrious king of Gods, Sri Parākaramabahu, the sovereign lord of Lanka, granted the pleasant village called Nāymannai. Should there be any, who from time to time, cause the maintenance of this grant, to them shall there be prosperity through the favour of the Gods. Should there be, on the other hand, any who would abstract it through greed, they, the meanest (among men) shall be deprived of merit, affluence and fame.' — Translated by A. Veluppillai,	

=== Kalutara pillar inscription ===
Kalutara pillar inscription
Background	Translation (English)	Inscription
Pillar inscription found in Kalutara dating to the 15th century AD. It records an endowment to a Kali temple.	These are the incomes from gardens and fields granted as heap by the king to the Kali of the five hundred. These are the incomes of grains granted on behalf of the chief. — Translated by A. Veluppillai,	

=== Poraitivu Cittiravēlāyutar temple inscription, Batticaloa ===
Poraitivu temple inscription
Background	Translation (English)	Inscription
Inscription dated to the 15th century on the Poraitivu Cittiravēlāyutar temple Mandapa mentioning the builder of the temple, Nagappa Chettiar, the son of Kailayanathar, as well as a land grant. It further states that Brahmins are the guardians of the temple.		

=== Kankuveli Agasthi Stapana Kovil inscription, Trincomalee ===
Kankuveli Agasthi Stapana Kovil inscription, Trincomalee
Background	Translation (English)	Inscription
Pillar inscription recording a grant to the Kankuveli Agasthi Stapana kovil dating to the 15th century AD.		

=== Tamil pillar inscription in the reign of Vijayabahu VI ===
Tamil pillar inscription in the reign of Vijayabahu VI
Background	Translation (English)	Inscription
Pillar inscription issued by Vijayabahu VI of Kotte in 1517 AD. It records the construction of a Kantacuvami temple by an Accutan Nayan.		

=== Thambiluvil inscription of Vijayabahu VI, Amparai ===
Thambiluvil inscription of Vijayabahu VI
Background	Translation (English)	Inscription
Thambiluvil Inscription issued by Vijayabahu VI (1513-1521 AD) recording his endowment of vōvil to a Siva temple in Thambiluvil, Amparai District.	'Sri Sangabodhi, the emperor of the three worlds, Sri Vijayabahu Devar gave vōvil (lake) to Sivanjana Sankarar Temple on the 20th of Thai month on the 10th year of his reign. If anyone violates this Dharma, they will suffer the sin of killing a cow on the banks of the river Ganges.'	Thambiluvil Inscription along with other inscriptions kept now in Thirukkovil Temple

=== Thirukkovil pillar inscription of Vijayabahu VI, Amparai ===
Thirukkovil pillar inscription
Background	Translation (English)	Inscription
Thirukkovil pillar inscription issued by Vijayabahu VI (1513-1521 AD) recording his endowment to the Cittiravēlāyutar Thirukkovil Temple in Amparai District.		Thirukkovil Inscription along with other inscriptions kept now in Thirukkovil Temple

=== Coins of the Jaffna Kingdom ===
Coins of the Jaffna Kingdom
Background	Translation (English)	Inscription
Coins issued by the Aryacakravarti dynasty of the Jaffna Kingdom (1215-1619 AD) with legends reading 'Setu'. The dynasty claimed to be protectors of the Setu and claimed lineage from the Tamil Brahmins of the prominent Hindu temple of Rameswaram.	'Setu' செது refers to Ram Setu (Ram's bridge).	Setu coin Setu coin

=== Trincomalee Fort Koneswaram inscription ===
Trincomalee Fort Koneswaram inscription
Background	Translation (English)	Inscription
An inscription dating from the 16th century prophesying the destruction of the Koneswaram Temple at the hands of the Portuguese. The temple was subsequently destroyed on 14 April 1622. The pair of fishes on the inscription likely date to the 13th century, when the Pandya dynasty had conquered Trincomalee.	'O King the Portuguese (Paranki) shall later break down the holy edifice built by Kulakkottan in ancient times and it shall not be rebuilt nor will future Kings think of doing so' — Translated by C. Rasanayagam,	Fort Frederick Koneswaram inscription

=== Tamil inscriptions from Thirumangalai, Trincomalee ===
Tamil inscriptions from Thirumangalai, Trincomalee
Background	Translation (English)	Inscription
Two Tamil slab inscriptions dating to the 15th and 16th century, were found in the ruins of a Siva temple in Thirumangalai, Trincomalee District.	The inscriptions record cows given as donations to the temple.	

== Late Kandyan period (1619 - 1815 AD) ==
=== Thirumangalai Temple Bell inscription, Trincomalee ===
Thirumangalai Temple Bell inscription, Trincomalee
Background	Translation (English)	Inscription
A bell belonging to the Thirumangalai temple was found in Kankuveli, Trincomalee District. An inscription on it dating to the 17th century shows that the temple was under worship for more than 700 years.	The donation by Pattaṉ the son of Pattipeṭi lived in Tirumańkalāi to the Tirumańkalāi Civaṉ temple.	Thirumangalai Temple Bell

=== Tamil conch inscription ===
Tamil conch inscription
Background	Translation (English)	Inscription
Valampuri conch with bronze attachments. There are figures of a Shiva linga, Nandi and peacock on the conch and a Tamil inscription dated paleographically to the 16th or 17th century AD.	The inscription records that the conch was made by Pulan Natar and Cuppiramaniya Natar for Narayan cuvami, and donated to the God Palani. — Translated by S. Pathmanathan,	Valampuri conch with Tamil inscription

=== Veeramunai Copper plates in the reign of Senarat, Amparai ===
Veeramunai Copper plates in the reign of Senarat
Background	Translation (English)	Inscription
Tamil copper plate grants found in Veeramunai, Amparai District. They record a visit of Chetty traders from Madurai with an idol of Ganesh and a royal princess. It is dated to the reign of King Senarat in the 17th century AD.		

=== Sammanthurai Copper plates in the reign of Rajasinghe II, Amparai ===
Sammanthurai Copper plates in the reign of Rajasinghe II
Background	Translation (English)	Inscription
Tamil copper plate grants to a Brahmin called Ramanathan found in Sammanthurai, Amparai District. It is dated to the reign of Rajasinghe II in the 17th century AD.	At the meritorious time of eclipse when the full-moon day and the lunar asterism of vicakam coincided on a Wednesday which was the twenty-ninth day of Cittirai month in the year 1615. Rajasinha, the king, the Lord, the Lord of kings, the Indra of the Colas from heaven, the illustrious one, the hero and the famous one, had gifted with sacred compassion. Konavattavanveli, Kottanpattu, including the free amenities which belonged to them, which existed in Pantittivuvelippattu, near Campanturai in Batticaloa area. Ramanatar, a Brahmin, received, with pouring of water (the gift to be enjoyed by his) family line, children after children. Anyone obstructing this shall suffer the sin of setting fire at Kãsi, Ramesvaram or the Manik Ganga at Kataragama. This is the way the copper plates were ordered to be given. — Translated by A. Veluppillai,	

=== Verugal Copper Plates of the Vanniyar, Trincomalee ===
Verugal Copper Plates of the Vanniyar
Background	Translation (English)	Inscription
Inscription found in Verugal, Trincomalee District dating to 1722 AD. It records the names of persons who built the four walls of a temple, including Kayilaya-vanniyanar (a ruling Vanniyar chieftain) and Timassa, the son of Simayapillai.		

=== Thirukkovil inscription of 1752, Amparai ===
Thirukkovil pillar inscription
Background	Translation (English)	Inscription
Charter engraved in 1752 referring to paddy land in Thirukkovil, Amparai District.		

=== Thirukkovil inscription of Palippodi Thambipodi, Amparai ===
Thirukkovil pillar inscription
Background	Translation (English)	Inscription
19th century boundary stone inscription left by a landowner known as Thambipodi. Podi refers to a land owner in the Batticaloa Tamil dialect. The pillar has a trisula symbol and was later placed in the Thirukkovil Temple in Amparai District.		

=== Kalpitiya Dutch fort Tamil inscription, Puttalam ===
Kalpitiya Dutch fort Tamil inscription, Puttalam
Background	Translation (English)	Inscription
Tamil inscription found in a cemetery in Kalpitiya, Puttalam District relating to the death of a 17 year old woman named Christina Fernando Vedhanayagam, the wife of Rosai-Era Peiris on 9th July 1815.		
