= Queen Sugala rebellion =

1157 Ruhuna revolt against Parakramabahu's rule

Date	1157
Location	Ruhuna
Result	Polonnaruwa victory
Territorial changes	Annexation of Ruhuna into the major Sinhalese kingdom.

Belligerents
(Anuradhapura kingdom) Kingdom of Polonnaruwa	(Anuradhapura kingdom) Principality of Ruhuna

Commanders and leaders
(Anuradhapura kingdom) Parakramabahu I; (Anuradhapura kingdom) Rakkha Dandadhinayaka †; (Anuradhapura kingdom) Lankanatha Kitti; (Anuradhapura kingdom) Sankadhatu; (Anuradhapura kingdom) Dandanayaka Kitti; (Anuradhapura kingdom) Lankapura Kadakuda; (Anuradhapura kingdom) Kammanatha Arrakha; (Anuradhapura kingdom) Kancukinayaka Rakkha; (Anuradhapura kingdom) Bhandarapothakin Bhuta; (Anuradhapura kingdom) Kammanatha Anjana; (Anuradhapura kingdom) Lakhadhikarin Manju; (Anuradhapura kingdom) Damiladhikarin Rakkha; (Anuradhapura kingdom) Kesadhatu Devaraja; (Anuradhapura kingdom) Mulapothakarin Mana	(Anuradhapura kingdom) Sugala; (Anuradhapura kingdom) Manabharana II

Units involved
(Anuradhapura kingdom) Polonnaruwa Army	(Anuradhapura kingdom) Ruhuna Rebels

Strength
Unknown	Unknown

Casualties and losses
Unknown	Unknown

1157 Ruhuna Rebellion, also known as the Rebellion of Queen Sugala, was a revolt led-by Queen Sugala of Ruhuna against the Kingdom of Polonnaruwa ruled by Parakramabahu the Great. The rebellion was suppressed by the army of Parakramabahu, and the kingdom of Ruhuna was annexed as a part of Polonnaruwa in 1158.

== Background ==
After the death of King Vikramabahu I, his son Prince Gajabha became the king of Polonnaruwa. During this period, the king Kithsirime of Maya Rata and Sri Vallabha of Ruhuna fought against King Gajabahu, but Gajabahu's general Gokanna drove them out.

Keerthi Sri Megha, who ruled Dakkhinadesa during this period, died and his sub-king Parakramabahu ascended to the throne. Shortly after becoming king, Parakramabahu came to Polonnaruwa with a large army and fought and defeated King Gajabahu, but with the intervention of the Sangha Polonnaruwa kingdom was again handed over to King Gajabahu.

== Revolt ==
After the demise of King Gajaba II, King Parakramabahu became the king of both Maya Rata and Polonnaruwa. But by this time Ruhuna was ruled by King Manabharana II. Shortly afterwards, Manabharana died, and his ministers continued the invasion of Polonnaruwa led before by Manabharana under the leadership of his mother, Sugala Devi. Katuwana was the site of Sugala's “defensive fortifications…for her warriors.”

By all accounts Sugala was a fearless military leader and “the queen had the strong loyalty of the people of the area, and her possession of the Alms Bowl and the Tooth Relic of the Buddha apparently gave her rule legitimacy.”

However, the revolt was suppressed “after a series of savage campaigns.” Eventually Queen Sugala and her totems of power were captured, and Ruhuna was annexed by Polonnaruwa.

== Aftermath ==
The annexation of Ruhuna united the whole of Sri Lanka under one flag, and this lasted until the death of Parakramabahu the Great in 1187.
