= Kotagama =

Kotagama may refer to:

- Sarath Kotagama
- Kotagama inscriptions
