= Kitti Sri Megha, Prince of Dakkinadesa =

Medieval king of the principality of Dakkinadesa in Sri Lanka

Kitti Sri Megha (died 1140), also referred to as Kittisrimegha, was a medieval king of the principality of Dakkinadesa in Sri Lanka. The nephew of King Vijayabahu I, he attempted to seize the throne of Sri Lanka along with his two brothers in 1110 CE, but was defeated by Vikramabahu I. He then retreated to the south of the country, which he initially ruled with his younger brother Sri Vallabha. He later ascended to the throne of Dakkinadesa following the death of his older brother Manabharana.

In his later years he adopted and borough up his nephew, the future king of Sri Lanka, Parakramabahu the Great.

== Background ==
Following the death of King Vijayabahu I in 1110, his brother Jayabahu was made king of Sri Lanka, in line with Vijayabahu's wishes. High official and minister of the government also declared that Manabharana, the son of princess Mitta, Vijayabahu's sister, should be made uparaja (literally "deputy king", the recognized heir to the throne). This incensed Vickramabahu, the son of Vijayabahu I, who himself had aspirations to the throne.

Realizing Vickramabahu posed a threat to them, Manabharana and Jayabahu set out to kill Vickramabahu. Kitti Sri Megha, Mahabharana's brother joined them in the battle against Vickramabahu, who was at the time ruler of the principality of Ruhuna. Although outnumbered, Vickramabahu was victorious, defeating the royal army in a number of battles. He then cut it off from its base in Polonnaruwa and occupied the capital, establishing himself as king of Rajarata.

== Accession to the throne ==
Defeated, Mahabharana and his brothers shared the rest of the country amongst themselves. Mahabharana became king of the Dakkhinadesa principality, while Kitti Sri Megha became king of Dolosdahasrata, which consisted of parts of the southern principality of Ruhuna west of the Walawe river. Their third brother, Siri Vallabha, ruled Atadahasrata, the remainder of Ruhuna.

A year later the three brothers attempted to launch an invasion of Rajarata and depose Vickramabahu. On hearing their plans, Vickramabahu marched into Dakkhinadesa and achieved a sweeping victory, after which the brothers ceased organising hostilities against Vickramabahu.

== Later years ==
Soon after the birth of his son Parakramabahu, Manabharana died around 1025 CE. After his death Kitti Sri Megha took over Dakkinadesa, while Siri Vallabha assumed control over the whole of Ruhuha. Vickramabahu died in 1131, and was succeeded by his son Gajabahu II. Eager to take advantage of the inexperienced of the new king of Rajarata, the two brothers attacked Gajabahu immediately after his accession to the throne. They were however defeated, and neither of them would try to conquer Rajarata again.

Kitti Sri Megha had no sons of his own, so he essentially adopted his nephew Parakramabahu. There was however a dispute between the two when Parakramabahu, aged fifteen at the time, traveled to the court of Gajabahu in Polonnaruwa against the wishes of his uncle. He did return to Dakkinadesa, shortly before the death of Kitti Sri Megha. Parakramabahu succeeded him as ruler of Dakkanadesa.

Rulers of Sri Lanka from 1090-1185
Kingdom	Monarch
Kingdom	1090	1100	1110	1120	1130	1140	1150	1160	1170	1180
Rajarata			Vikramabâhu I			Gajabâhu II
Dakkinadesa	Vijayabâhu I		Manabharana		Kitti Sri Megha		Parâkramabâhu I
Ruhuna			Sri Vallabha & Kitti Sri Megha		Sri Vallabha	Manabharana

== See also ==
- History of Sri Lanka
- Polonnaruwa kingdom
