= A. Veluppillai =

Sri Lankan Tamil historian, author (1936–2015)

- Born: 21 November 1936; Puloly, Ceylon
- Died: 1 November 2015 (aged 78); San Francisco, California, United States
- Education: University of Ceylon, Peradeniya; University of Oxford
- Occupation: Academic

Alvappillai Veluppillai (21 November 1936 – 1 November 2015) was a Sri Lankan Tamil academic, historian and author.

== Early life and family ==
Veluppillai was born on 21 November 1936 in Puloly in northern Ceylon. He was the son of Veluppillai Alvappillai. He was educated at Puttalai Tamil School (1941–44), Puloly Boys' English School (1945-52) and Hartley College (1953–54). After school he joined the University of Ceylon, Peradeniya in 1955, graduating in 1959 with a first class BA honours degree. He was a student of K. Kanapathypillai. He received a PhD degree from the university in 1962 after producing a thesis titled A Study of the Language of Tamil Inscriptions of Catavarman Cuntarapantiyan and Maravarman Kulacekaran (1251–1350 AD). He entered the University of Oxford in 1962 as student of Thomas Burrow, receiving a D.Phil degree in 1964 for his thesis A Study of the Language of Tamil Inscriptions of the period 800 to 920 AD. On 31 May 1996 Veluppillai received an honorary doctorate from the Faculty of Theology at Uppsala University, Sweden

Veluppillai married Meenatchi. They had two children (Sivapriyai and Arulalan).

== Career ==
Veluppillai joined the University of Ceylon, Peradeniya in 1959 as an assistant lecturer in Tamil. He passed the Ceylon Civil Service in 1961 and was selected to join the service but chose to continue with his academic work. He visited the Annamalai University and University of Madras and studied, along with K. Indrapala, epigraphy at Chief Epigraphist Office of the Archaeological Survey of India in Mysore in the 1960s.

Veluppillai was promoted to lecturer (1964), senior lecturer (1970) and associate professor (1976). He served as head of the Department of Tamil at the University of Sri Lanka Peradeniya campus/University of Peradeniya twice, 1977–81 and 1982–83. During this period he was also senior fellow at the Dravidian Linguistics Association (1973–74); visiting professor at the University of Kerala's Department of Linguistics (1973–74); visiting international senior professor at the International Institute of Tamil Studies in Madras (1980); and Commonwealth Academic Fellow at the University of Edinburgh's Department of Linguistics (1982–83).

Veluppillai joined the University of Jaffna in 1984 as professor of Tamil. He was head of the university's Department of Tamil from 1984 to 1990.

Veluppillai was guest professor at Uppsala University's Department of History of Religions between 1990 and 2000. He received an honorary degree from the university in 1996. He lectured at the University of Virginia between 2000 and 2002. He joined the Arizona State University in 2002 as a faculty associate in the Department of Religious Studies.

After retirement in 2009 Veluppillai lived with his children and grandchildren in the USA. He suffered head injuries after falling in the bathroom of his home and died at a San Francisco hospital on 1 November 2015.

== Works ==
Veluppillai wrote several books and articles on Sri Lankan Tamil literature, history and politics.

- An Outline of Tamil Literary Thought (Tamil) (1965)
- A Historical Grammar of Tamil (Tamil) (1966)
- Inscriptions and Tamil Studies (Tamil) (1971)
- Ceylon Tamil Inscriptions, Part I (1971)
- Ceylon Tamil Inscriptions, Part II (1972)
- Pandya Inscriptions - A Language Study (1972)
- Study of the Dialects in Inscriptional Tamil (1976, Dravidian Linguistics Association)
- Epigraphical Evidence(s) for Tamil Studies (1980, International Institute of Tamil Studies)
- Essays on the Religion of the Tamils (Tamil) (1980)
- Early Sri Lanka Tamil Literary Works and their Historical Background (Tamil) (1986)
- Religious Traditions of the Tamils (1995)
- Munnicuvaram (Munnesvaram) Kovil: Its History, Ceremonies and Layout (1995)
- Buddhism Among Tamils of Pre-Colonial Tamilakam and Ilam, (2002, Uppsala University, co-editors Peter Schalk and Ira Nakacami)
- The Fear of the Demand for One Country, Two States, and Equal Individual Opportunity (2003)
- Reflections on the shedding of Tamil blood for fifty years in Sri Lanka (2006)
- Reflections on the national flag of Sri Lanka and State terrorism (2006)
- Reflections on the Buddha and the myth of the Sinhala Buddhist origin (2006)
- Pandya Rule at the Beginning of Ancient Lankan History (2006)
