= Gomarankadawala Divisional Secretariat =

- Divisional Secretariat
- Interactive map of Gomarankadawala Divisional Secretariat
- Country: Sri Lanka
- Province: Eastern Province
- District: Trincomalee District

Government
  - Divisional Secretary: Mr. S. M. C. Samarakoon

Area
  - Land: 110 sq mi (285 km^{2})

Population
  - Total: 8,697 (Source: Resource Profile 2,012)
  - Density: 78/sq mi (30/km^{2})
- Among the total population 26 people Tamil (0.003%) and rest 8,671 are Sinhalese.
- Time zone: UTC+5:30 (Sri Lanka Standard Time)
- ZIP: 31026
- GN Divisions: the division consist of 10 Grama Nildhari (தமிழ்: கிராம உத்தியோகத்தர் பிரிவு)divisions and 50 villages.
- Website: "www.gomarankadawala.ds.gov.lk"

Gomarankadawala Divisional Secretariat is a Divisional Secretariat of Trincomalee District, of Eastern Province, Sri Lanka.

== Geography ==
Gomarankadawala division has an area of 285 square kilometres (110 sq mi).

Religion in Gomarankadawala DS Division (2012)
1. Buddhist (99.4%)
2. Hindu (0.40%)
3. Muslim (0.00%)
4. Roman Catholic (0.10%)
5. Other Christian (0.00%)
6. Other (0.00%)
