= Jayabahu I =

King of Polonnaruwa from 1110 to 1111

- King of Polonnaruwa
- Reign: 1110–1111
- Predecessor: Vijayabâhu I
- Successor: Vikramabâhu I
- Born: Ruhuna
- House: House of Vijayabahu
- Father: King Moggallana
- Mother: Queen Lokitha
- Religion: Theravada Buddhism

Jayabâhu I was the brother of Vijayabâhu I. He ruled for just one year, from 1110 to 1111. He was defeated in war by Vikramabâhu I.

== See also ==
- Mahavamsa
- List of monarchs of Sri Lanka
- History of Sri Lanka

Jayabahu I House of Vijayabahu Born: ? ? Died: ? ?
Regnal titles
Preceded by Vijayabâhu I	King of Polonnaruwa; 1110–1111	Succeeded by Vikramabâhu I
