= Kankuveli =

Coordinates: 8°22′N 81°15′E

Kankuveli is an ancient Tamil village near Trincomalee city. It is located close to Thoppur. It was part of the Jaffna kingdom's Vannimai districts throughout the medieval period, and was part of the Malabar Coylot Wanees Country by the 18th century. Kankuveli is home to a large water reservoir, Kankuveli Kulam. The 13th century CE Tamil stone inscription in Kankuveli village records the assignment by Vanniar chiefs Malaiyil Vanniyanar and Eluril Atappar of income and other contributions from the rice fields and meadows of the Vannimai districts of the ascending Jaffna kingdom to the Koneswaram shrine.

Kankuveli is also home to the ruins of the ancient Siddhar Tamil medical university established by Agastya, known as the “Agathiyar Thapanam” which alongside Koneswaram and other Hindu temples of Trincomalee District, helped spread Tamil Tamraparniyan culture during the pre-classical era.

== See also ==
- Koneswaram temple
- Trincomalee
