= K. Indrapala =

Sri Lankan Tamil academic (born 1938)

Professor K. Indrapala
- Born: 22 October 1938 (age 87)
- Education: Jaffna College; University of Ceylon
- Occupation: Academic
- Title: Dean of the Faculty of Arts, University of Jaffna
- Term: December 1982 – July 1984
- Predecessor: S. Kailasapathy
- Successor: N. Balakrishnan

Karthigesu Indrapala (born 22 October 1938) is a Sri Lankan academic, historian, archaeologist, author and former dean of the Faculty of Arts, University of Jaffna.

== Early life and family ==
Indrapala was born on 22 October 1938. He was the son of K. Karthigesu and Kanakambikai Ambal from Vaddukoddai in northern Ceylon. He was educated at Jaffna College. After school he joined the University of Ceylon, Peradeniya in 1956, graduating with a first class honours degree in ancient history.

Indrapala married Priyadarshani, daughter of C. Somasundeeram from Navaly. They have two daughters (Harini and Dharini).

== Career ==
Indrapala was interested in epigraphy and studied Tamil and other language inscriptions. He joined the faculty at the Department of History, University of Ceylon, Peradeniya in 1960. He started researching the history of Tamils on the island, paying particular attention to Tamil inscriptions. He continued his studies in London, receiving a PhD after producing a thesis titled Dravidian Settlements in Ceylon and the Beginnings of the Jaffna Kingdom.

Indrapala then returned to Peradeniya to continue his research into Tamil inscriptions. He underwent epigraphy training in Mysore. Between 1966 and 1974 Indrapala explored the jungles of Northern, North Central and Eastern provinces, discovering new Tamil inscriptions and Hindu temples.

Indrapala was appointed dean of the Faculty of Humanities at the Jaffna campus of the University of Sri Lanka in 1974. He was a visiting professor at the University of Tokyo in 1976. Later he became Foundation Professor of History at the newly created University of Jaffna. He established courses in archaeology and epigraphy and the archaeological museum at the university. He then carried out various archaeological excavations on the Jaffna Peninsula, discovering the ancient burial site at Anaikoddai. He was dean of the Faculty of Arts at the university from December 1982 to July 1984.

Indrapala joined the new Tamil University in Thanjavur in 1984. Later he moved to Australia.

== Published books ==
- K Indrapala The Evolution of an Ethnic Identity: The Tamils of Sri Lanka C. 300 BCE to C. 1200 CE (Ohm Books Publishing, 2015 - ISBN 978-1511674126)
- K Indrapala Ancient Tamil Nadu: Glimpses of the Past (Ohm Books Publishing, 2021 - ISBN 979-8590567386)
- K Indrapala Ancient Sri Lanka: Glimpses of the Past (Ohm Books Publishing, 2022 - ISBN 979-8436812137)
