= Kotagama inscription =

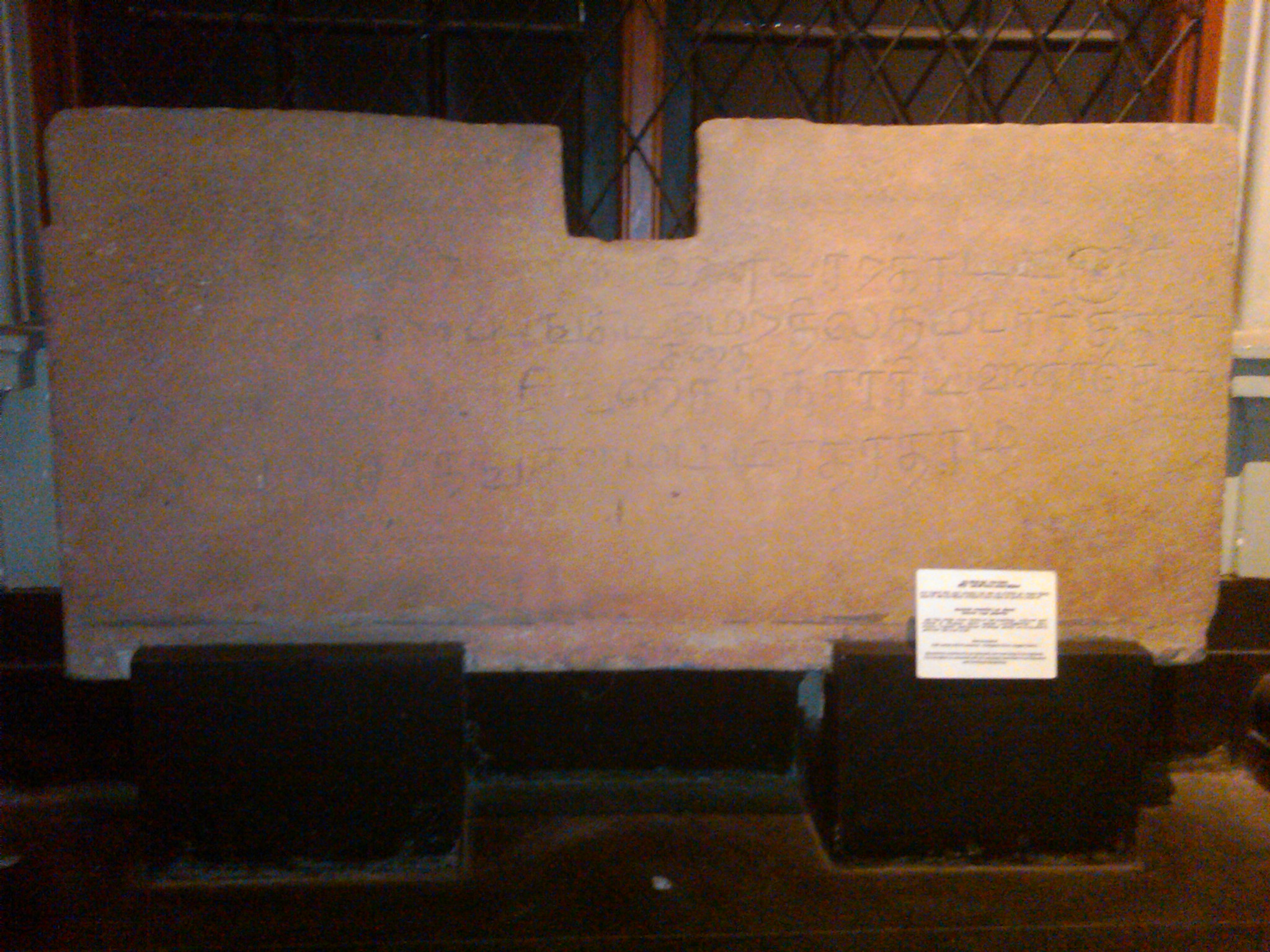
- Kotagma inscription as displayed in the National Museum of Colombo, Sri Lanka in December 2011
- Material: Stone
- Writing: Tamil
- Discovered: Kotagama, Kegalle
- Present location: National Museum of Colombo

The Kotagama inscription found in Kegalle District in Sri Lanka is a record of victory left by the Aryacakravarti kings of the Jaffna Kingdom in western Sri Lanka. The inscription reads;

"The women-folks of lords of Anurai (A word used in Tamil originally for Anuradhapura, and then for any capital of the Sinhalese) who did not submit to Ariyan of Cinkainakar of foaming and resounding waters shed tears from eyes that glinted like spears and performed the rites of pouring water with gingerly seed (form of last right ceremony for departed souls) from the bejeweled lotus like hands."

Some historians attribute the inscriptions to Martanda Cinkaiariyan (died 1348) whereas others date it to the 15th century based on language usage. The inscription is written in Tamil script.

== See also ==
- Annaicoddai seal
- Tissamaharama Tamil Brahmi inscription
