= Gajabahu II =

King of Polonnaruwa from 1131 to 1153

- King of Polonnaruwa
- Reign: 1131–1153
- Predecessor: Vikramabahu I
- Successor: Parakramabahu I
- Died: 1187
- House: House of Vijayabahu
- Mother: Sundara Devi
- Religion: Theravada Buddhism

Gajabahu II was king of Rajarata from 1131 until 1153, following his father Vikramabahu I. He was defeated and succeeded by Parakramabahu I.

== Background ==
=== Religious views ===
In the Tamil chronicles of Trincomalee, Gajabahu II is described initially as being a Buddhist king responsible for the spread of Buddhism. The king then adopts Shaivism, and spends his days devoted to Saiva learning, and regularly sponsoring pujas and festivals. He richly supports the Koneswaram Temple with grants, spending his last days at the Brahmin village of Kantalai. The Mahavamsa similarly claims that he strongly supported non-Buddhist religions. However, the inscriptional evidence suggests that he supported both Hindu and Buddhist temples alike.

== See also ==
- Mahavamsa
- List of monarchs of Sri Lanka
- History of Sri Lanka

Gajabahu II House of Vijayabahu Born: ? ? Died: ? ?
Royal titles
Preceded by Vikramabahu I	King of Polonnaruwa; 1131–1153	Succeeded by Parakramabahu I
