= Anaikoddai seal =

Brahmi inscription mixed with Megalithic Graffiti Symbols found in Anaikottai, Sri Lanka

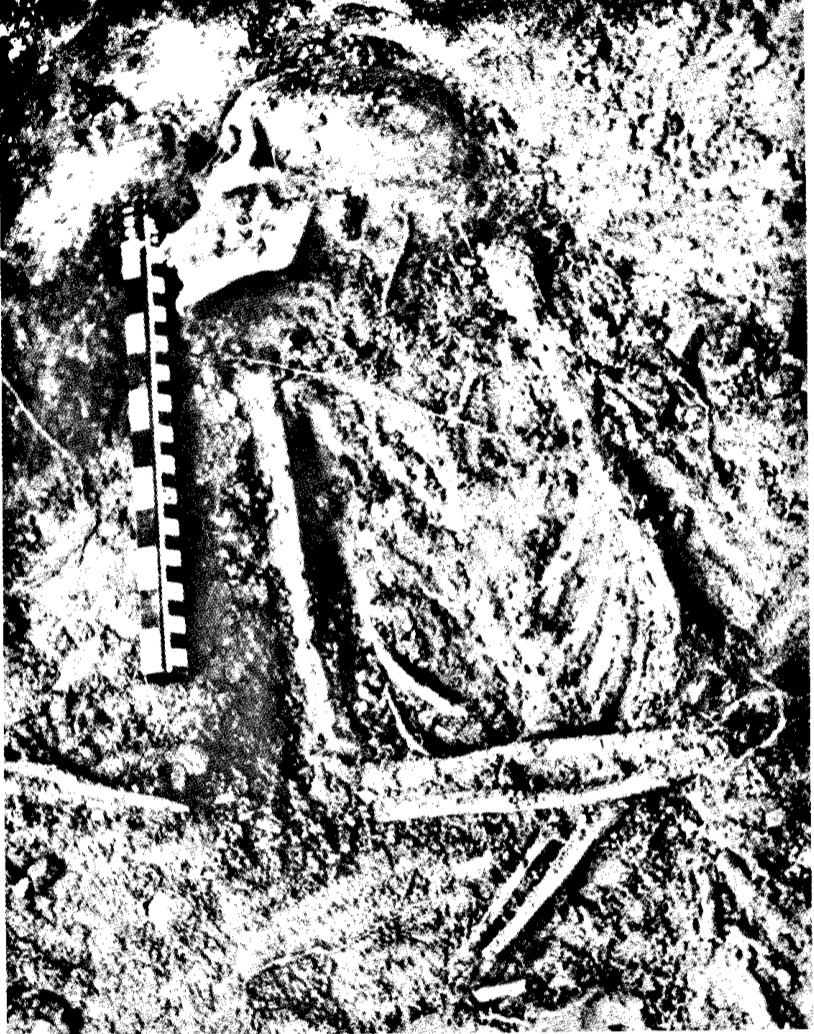
Prognathic skeleton found in the same burial.

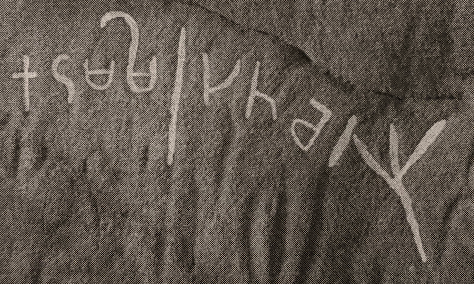
Tamil Brahmi inscription from Kerala with similar trident symbol. It reads 'kadummi puta chera'

The Anaikoddai seal is a soapstone seal that was found in Anaikoddai, Sri Lanka during archeological excavations of a megalithic burial site by a team of researchers from the University of Jaffna. The seal was originally part of a signet ring and contains one of the oldest Tamil-Brahmi inscriptions mixed with megalithic graffiti symbols found on the island. It was dated paleographically to the early third century BC.

== Inscription ==
Although many pottery fragments have been found in excavations throughout Sri Lanka and South India that had both Brahmi and megalithic graffiti symbols side by side, the Anaikoddai seal is distinguished by having each written in a manner that indicates that the megalithic graffiti symbols may be a translation of the Brahmi. Read from right to left, the legend is read by most scholars in early Tamil as Koveta (Ko-ve-ta 𑀓𑁄𑀯𑁂𑀢). 'Ko' and 'Veta' both mean 'King' in Tamil and refers to a chieftain here. It is comparable to such names as Ko Ataṉ and Ko Putivira occurring in contemporary Tamil-Brahmi inscriptions. The trident symbol is equated with 'King', and is also found after a Tamil-Brahmi inscription of the Chera dynasty, thus supporting this interpretation.

Investigators disagree on whether megalithic graffiti symbols found in South India and Sri Lanka constitute an ancient writing system that preceded the introduction and widespread acceptance of Brahmi variant scripts or non-lithic symbols. The purpose of usage remains unclear.

== See also ==
- Early Indian epigraphy
- South Indian Inscriptions
- Tamil inscriptions in Sri Lanka

== Literature ==
Ponnampalam Ragupathy and Thillimalar Ragupathy: Early Settlements in Jaffna: An Archaeological Survey. 1987.

== Cited literature ==
- Boivin, Nicole; Korisettar, Ravi; Venkatasubbaiah, P.C (2003), "Megalithic Markings in Context: graffiti marks on burial pots from Kudatini, Karnataka", South Asian Studies, 19 (1): 21–33, doi:10.1080/02666030.2003.9628618, S2CID 191482596
- Indrapala, Karthigesu (2005). The Evolution of an Ethnic Identity - The Tamils of Sri Lanka 300 B.C.E to 1200 C.E. M.V. Publications for the South Asian Studies Centre, Sydney. ISBN 0-646-42546-3.
- Raghupathy, Ponnambalam (1987). Early settlements in Jaffna, an archaeological survey. Madras: Raghupathy.
- Mahadevan, I. (2014). Early Tamil Epigraphy - From the Earliest Times to the Sixth century C.E., 2nd Edition.
- Rajan, K.; Bopearachchi, Osmund (2002). "Graffiti Marks of Kodumanal (India) and Ridiyagama (Sri Lanka) — A Comparative Study". Man and Environment. 27 (2).
- Seneviratne, Sudharshan (1992). Pre-State Chieftains And Servants of the State: A Case Study of Parumaka.
- Seneviratne, Sudharshan (2006). "Reading the past in a more inclusive way" (Interview). Interviewed by T.S. Subramanian. Frontline.
