= Vikramabahu I =

King of Polonnaruwa from 1111 to 1132

Vikramabâhu I
- King of Polonnaruwa
- Reign: 1111–1132
- Predecessor: Jayabâhu I
- Successor: Gajabahu II
- Died: 1132
- Consort: Sundara Maha Devi
- Issue: Gajabahu II
- House: House of Vijayabahu
- Father: Vijayabahu I
- Mother: Thilokasundari
- Religion: Theravada Buddhism

Vikramabâhu I (ruled 1111–1132) was a medieval king of Sri Lanka. He was the son of king Vijayabahu I and the Queen Thilokasundari who was a Kalinga princess. He was the "Mapa"("Maha Arya Pada" or prince successor) who ruled the Ruhuna on behalf of the king during king Jayabâhu I's reign.

After the death of king Jayabâhu I, there were many conflicts due to the conspiracy by Vikramabâhu I's aunt, the sister of king Vijayabahu I, Miththa, to give the throne to her son while Vikramabâhu I was in Ruhuna. However, Vikramabâhu who was the rightful ruler who was able to gain the throne while his aunt and her sons fled the country.

== See also ==
- Mahavamsa
- List of monarchs of Sri Lanka
- History of Sri Lanka

Vikramabahu I House of Vijayabahu Born: ? ? Died: ? ?
Regnal titles
Preceded by Jayabâhu I	King of Polonnaruwa; 1111–1132\31	Succeeded by Gajabahu II
