= Trincomalee =

Trincomalee திருக்கோணமலை ත්‍රිකුණාමලය
- City
- City of Trincomalee
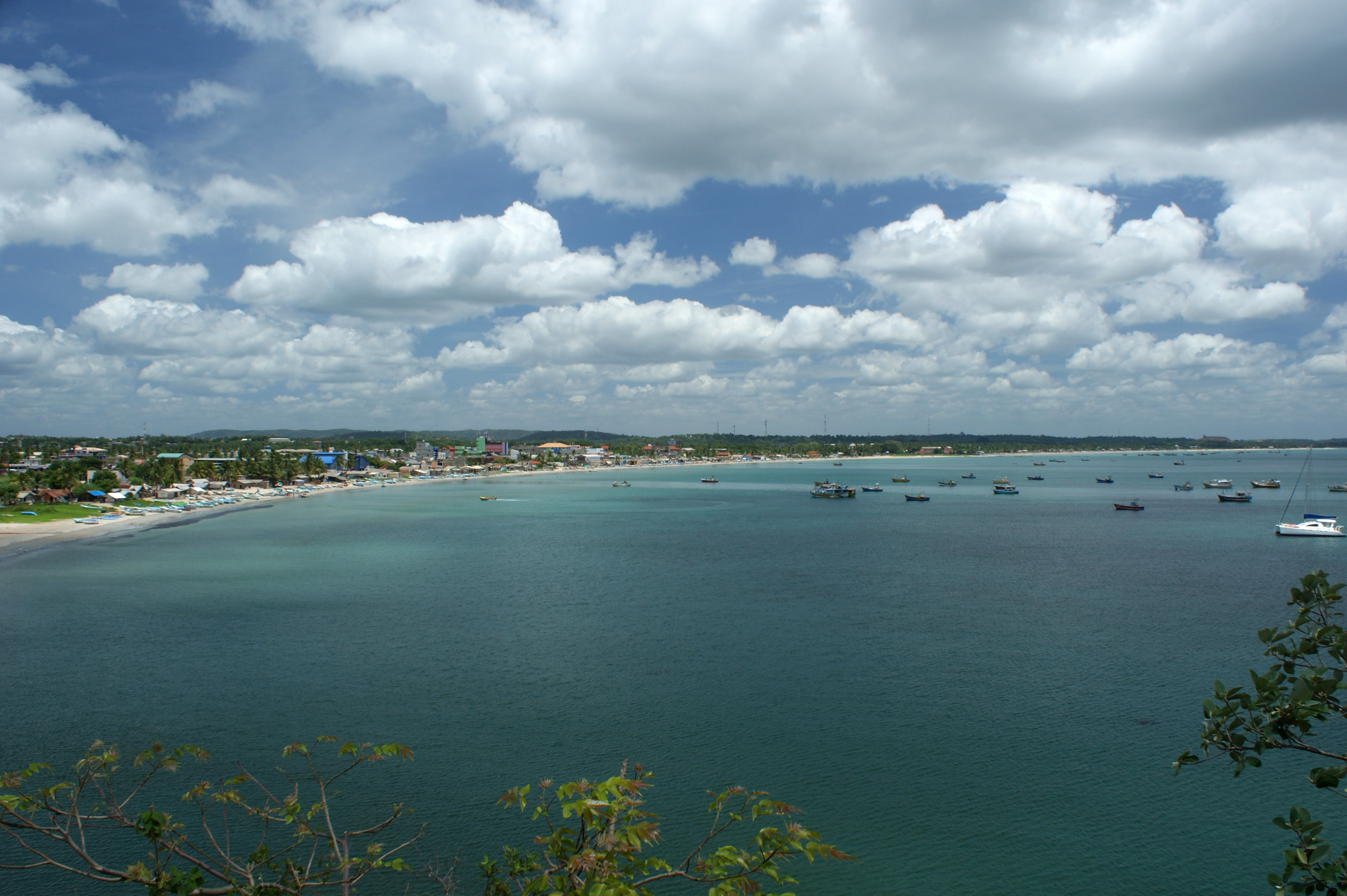
- View of Trincomalee Bay

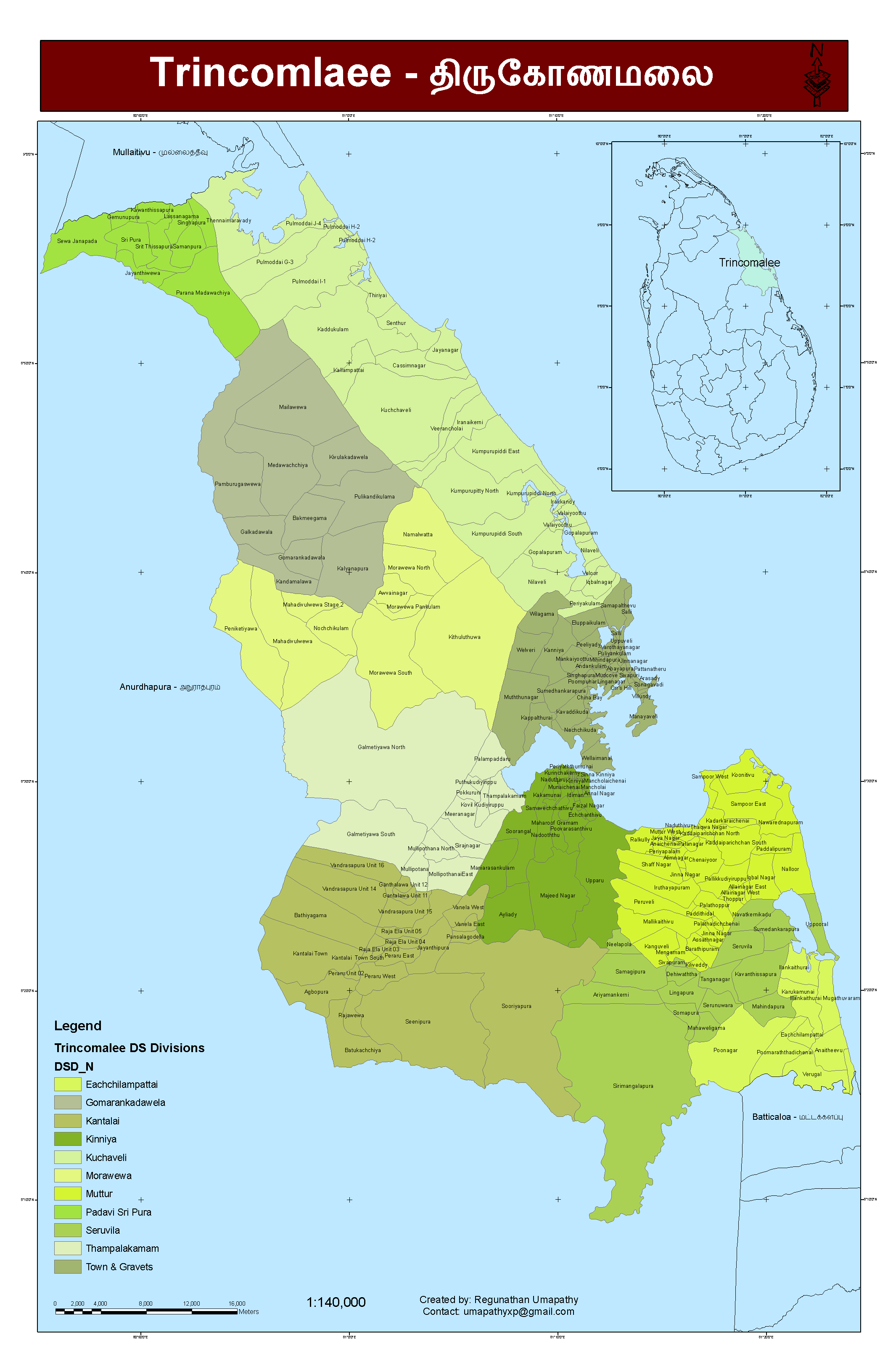

- Location within Sri Lanka
- Coordinates: 8°34′0″N 81°14′0″E
- Country: Sri Lanka
- Province: Eastern
- District: Trincomalee
- DS Division: Trincomalee Town & Gravets

Government
  - Type: Urban Council

Area
  - Total: 7.5 km^{2} (2.9 sq mi)
- Elevation: 8 m (26 ft)

Population (2012)
  - Total: 99,135
  - Density: 13,000/km^{2} (34,000/sq mi)
- Demonym: Trincomalians
- Time zone: UTC+5:30 (SLST)

Trincomalee (English: /ˌtrɪŋkoʊməˈliː/; Tamil: திருக்கோணமலை, romanized: Tirukkōṇamalai, IPA: [t̪iɾukːoːɳɐmɐlɛi̯]; Sinhala: ත්‍රිකුණාමළය, romanized: Trikuṇāmaḷaya, IPA: [t̪rikunaːmələjə]), also known historically as Gokanna and Gokarna, is the main city of the Eastern Province of Sri Lanka. It stands on the east coast of the island, overlooking Trincomalee Harbour, and has a population of 99,135. A major port and a resort, it is the administrative centre of Trincomalee District. Trincomalee has been one of the main centres of Sri Lankan Tamil–speaking culture on the island for nearly a millennium. The city is built on a peninsula of the same name, which divides its inner and outer harbours. It is home to the famous Koneswaram temple from where it developed and earned its historic Tamil name Thirukonamalai. The town is home to other historical monuments such as the Bhadrakali Amman Temple, Trincomalee, the Trincomalee Hindu Cultural Hall and, opened in 1897, the Trincomalee Hindu College. Trincomalee is also the site of the Trincomalee railway station and an ancient ferry service to Jaffna and the south side of the harbour at Muttur. The city's architecture shows some of the best examples of interaction between native and European styles.

Trincomalee was made into a fortified port town following the Portuguese conquest of the Jaffna kingdom, changing hands between the Danish in 1620, the Dutch, the French following a battle of the American Revolutionary War and the British in 1795, being absorbed into the British Ceylon state in 1815. The city was attacked by the Japanese as part of the Indian Ocean raid during World War II in 1942. Trincomalee and the surrounding district were affected after Sri Lanka gained independence in 1948, when the political relationship between Tamil and Sinhalese people deteriorated, erupting into civil war. The city is home to major naval and air force bases at the Trincomalee Garrison, and also contains the Hoods Tower Museum, the largest Dutch fort on the island.

The Trincomalee Bay, bridged by the Mahavilli Ganga River to the south, the historical "Gokarna" in Sanskrit, means "Cow's Ear", akin to other sites of Siva worship across the Indian subcontinent. Uniquely, Trincomalee is a Pancha Ishwaram, a Paadal Petra Sthalam, a Maha Shakta pitha and Murugan Tiruppadai of Sri Lanka; its sacred status to the Hindus has led to it being declared "Dakshina-Then Kailasam" or "Mount Kailash of the South" and the "Rome of the Pagans of the Orient". The harbour is renowned for its large size and security; unlike any other in the Indian Ocean, it is accessible in all weathers to all craft. It has been described as the "finest harbour in the world" and by the British, "the most valuable colonial possession on the globe, as giving to our Indian Empire a security which it had not enjoyed from elsewhere".

== Names and etymology ==
Early maps of Trincomalee

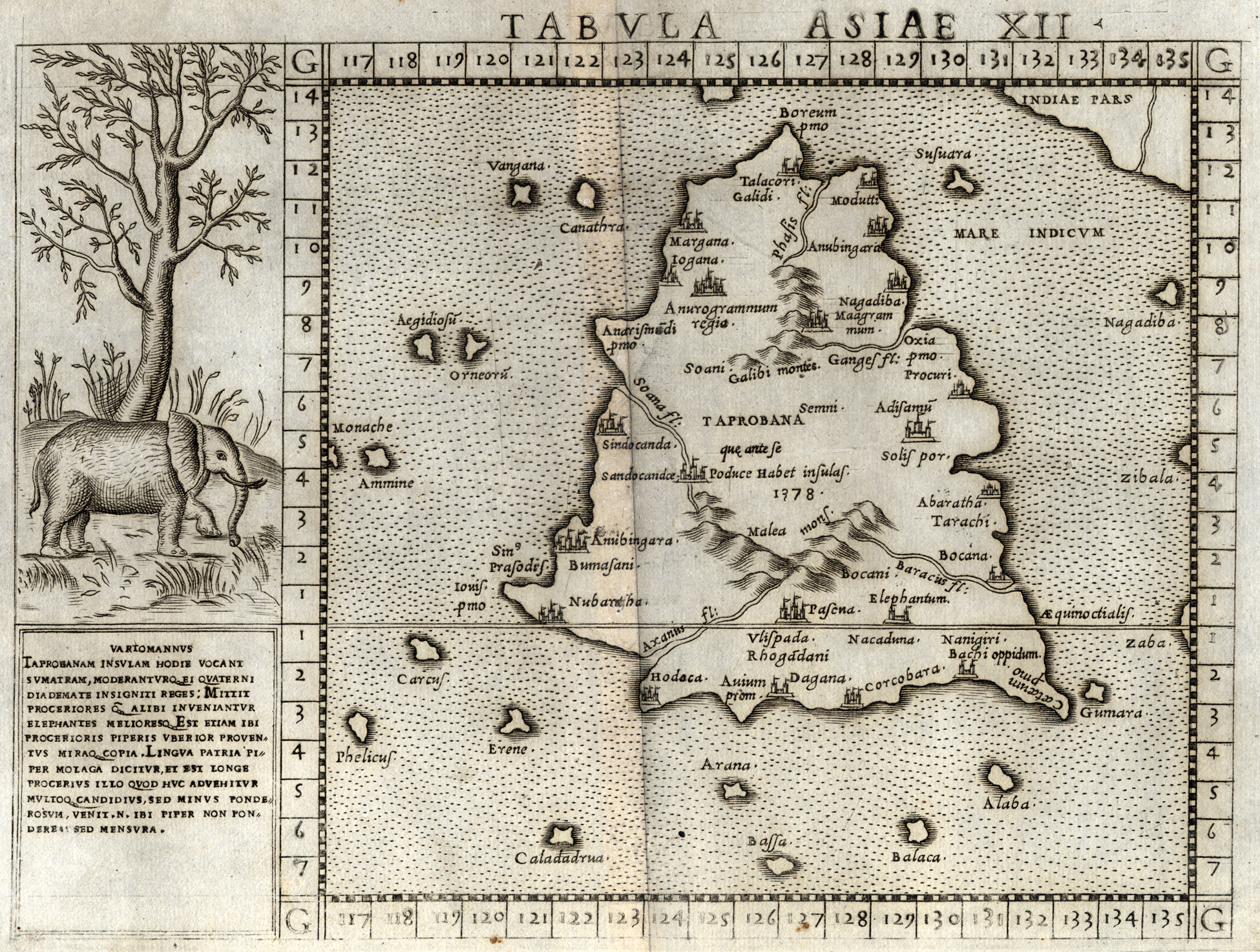
Ptolemy's map of Taprobana of 140 CE in a 1562 Ruscelli publication. From the Shiva footprint of Ulipada of Malea mountains (Sivan Oli Pada Malai) rises three rivers, including the Mavillie-Gangai (Mahavali-Ganges) whose tributary Barraces river's estuary into the Indian Ocean is just south of Bocana (Ko-Kannam bay) where the temple is illustrated. Just above, both cartographers mention Abaratha Ratchagar, another name of Lord Shiva – a temple with this name is also found in Aduthurai, Thanjavur, Tamil Nadu, near the early Chola capital.

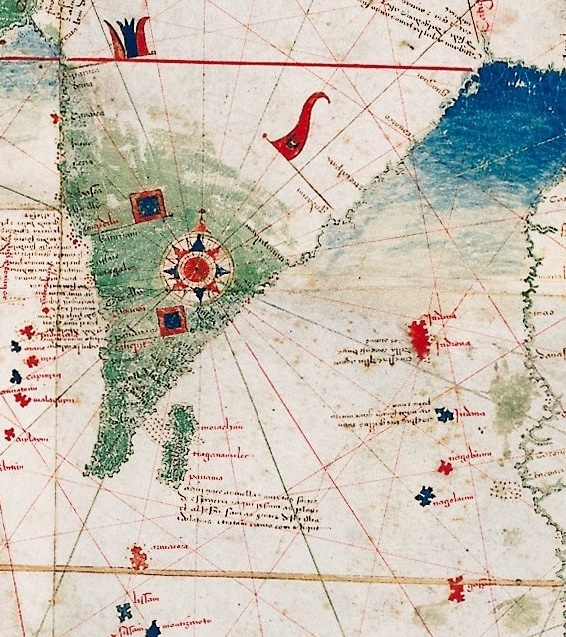
Cantino map of 1502, showing three Tamil towns on east coast, Mullaitivu, Trincomalee (Traganamalee) and Pannoam.

=== Trincomalee ===
The city has developed from a village settlement on the promontory dedicated to the Hindu shrine. The origin of the term Ko, Kone and Konatha lies in the Old Tamil word for the terms "Lord", "King" or "Chief", which allude to the deity that presides here; this term appears in several Tamil Brahmi inscriptions of the 6th century BCE — 2nd century CE. Trincomalee, the coastal peninsula town where Koneswaram is located is an anglicized form of the old Tamil word "Thiru-kona-malai" (Tamil: திருக்கோணமலை), meaning "Lord of the Sacred Hill", its earliest reference in this form found in the Tevaram of the 7th century by Sambandhar. Thiru is a generally used epithet denoting a "sacred" temple site while Malai means mountain or hill; Middle Tamil manuscripts and inscriptions mention the monumental compound shrine as the Thirukonamalai Konesar Kovil. Kona (Tamil: கோண) has other meanings in Old Tamil such as peak, while another origin for the term Koneswaram could come from the Tamil term Kuna (East). Therefore, other translators suggest definitions of Trincomalee such as "sacred angular/peaked hill", "sacred eastern hill" or "three peaked hill". The temple was constructed atop Swami Rock, also called Swami Malai or Kona-ma-malai, a cliff on the peninsula that drops 400 feet (120 metres) directly into the sea.

=== Gokarna Bay, Trincomalee ===
The Trincomalee Harbour, a circular natural harbour which the temple crowns towards the north, is referred to as Ko-Kannam or "Lord's Cheek", alluding to the cheek shape of Shiva's bull Nandi. The Sanskrit equivalent of the port town's harbour bay is Go-Karna, meaning "Cow's Ear" or Gokarna Pattana and the deity's name Gokarneswara or Go—Natha in Sanskrit. Pathmanathan offers the etymological link Thiru-Gokarna-Malai or Thiru-Gona-Malai based on this connection.

The ethnographer Megasthenes writing in his Indica from 350 — 290 BCE, describes the island as being divided by a long river, productive of a large number of gold and pearls in one half and that the inhabitants of this country are called Paleogoni, meaning Old Goni in Tamil and Greek, who Pliny adds worshipped Hercules and Dionysus (Bacchus) like the Pandyans of Tamilakam. The Vayu Purana, written in 300 CE specifically mentions the tallest mountain peak of the great gold and silver rich mountain range Malaya on the island, and that "to the east of this island at the shore of the sea lies a great Siva temple in a holy place called Gokarna." The bay is also referred to as Gokaranna according to a Sanskrit inscription in Grantha script excavated on a doorjamb at the Hindu temple dated to Tamil New Years Day 1223 CE. Gokarna is also a place name in Karnataka, India, Kalinga, Tamil Nadu and Nepal all associated with ancient Shiva temples. The associated Bhadrakali Amman Temple of Trincomalee, significantly expanded by Rajendra Chola I, stands on Konesar Road before the entrance to Swami Rock.

=== Kailaas of the South ===
Heralded as "Dakshina Kailasam"/"Then Kailasam" (Kailaas of the South) because it lies on exactly the same longitude as the Tibetan mountain Mount Kailash (the primary abode of Shiva), Trincomalee's traditional history and legends were compiled into the Sanskrit treatises Dakshina Kailasa Puranam — Sthala Puranam of Koneswaram, written in 1380 by Jeyaveera Cinkaiariyan, and the Dakshina Kailasa Manmiam — three chapters of the Skanda Puranam of unknown antiquity — manuscripts of which have been discovered and dated from the 5th — 7th century. It was in the Puranas that the shrine first found reference as Koneiswara Parwatia, motivating Kullakottan Chola who learnt of its sanctity to sail to Trincomalee and develop the three Hindu temples of the Koneswaram compound. The compiler of the Yoga Sutras, Patañjali's place of birth at the temple corroborates Tirumular's Tirumandhiram, which describes him as hailing from Then Kailasam and his self description as a "Gonardiya" from Gonarda, "a country in the southern and eastern division" of the Indian continent. Both men were ardent disciples of Nandi. The Konesar Kalvettu uses the term Tiri Kayilai, meaning "three Kailasams", Tiri Kutam and Tiri Konam for Trincomalee, in a number of places, referring to the three pagodas on the promontory of Trincomalee.

As per another legend, Vayu Bhaghvan and Adiseshan had a dispute to find out who is superior, to prove the superiority adiseshan encircled the Kailasam, Vayu tried to remove this encircle by creating santamarutham (Twister). Due to the santamarutham, eight (8) kodumudigal (parts) fell from kailasam into 8 different places: are Thirugonamalai (Trincomalee), Thirukalahasti, Thiruchiramalai, Thiruenkoimalai, Rajathagiri, Neerthagiri, Ratnagiri, and Suwethagiri Thirupangeeli.

== History ==
=== Earliest history ===
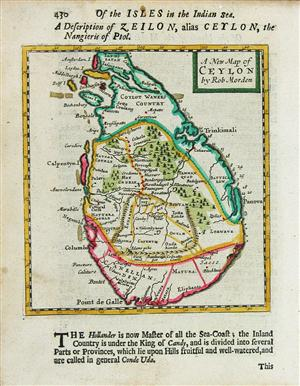
Robert Morden's 1688 map of the island with Trincomalee on the northeast coast.

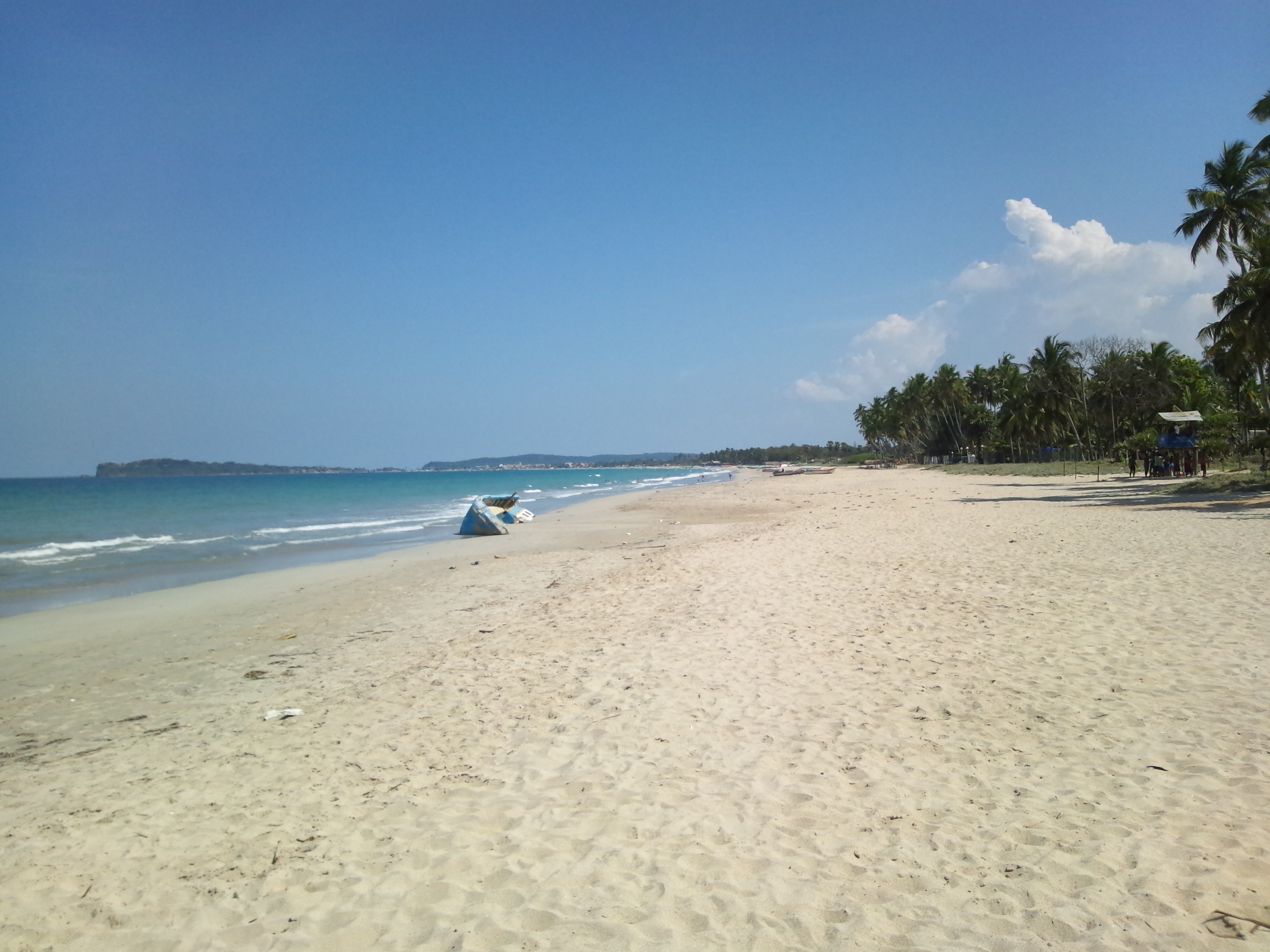
Uppuveli Beach in Trincomalee city, a coastal resort city, with Konesar Malai in background

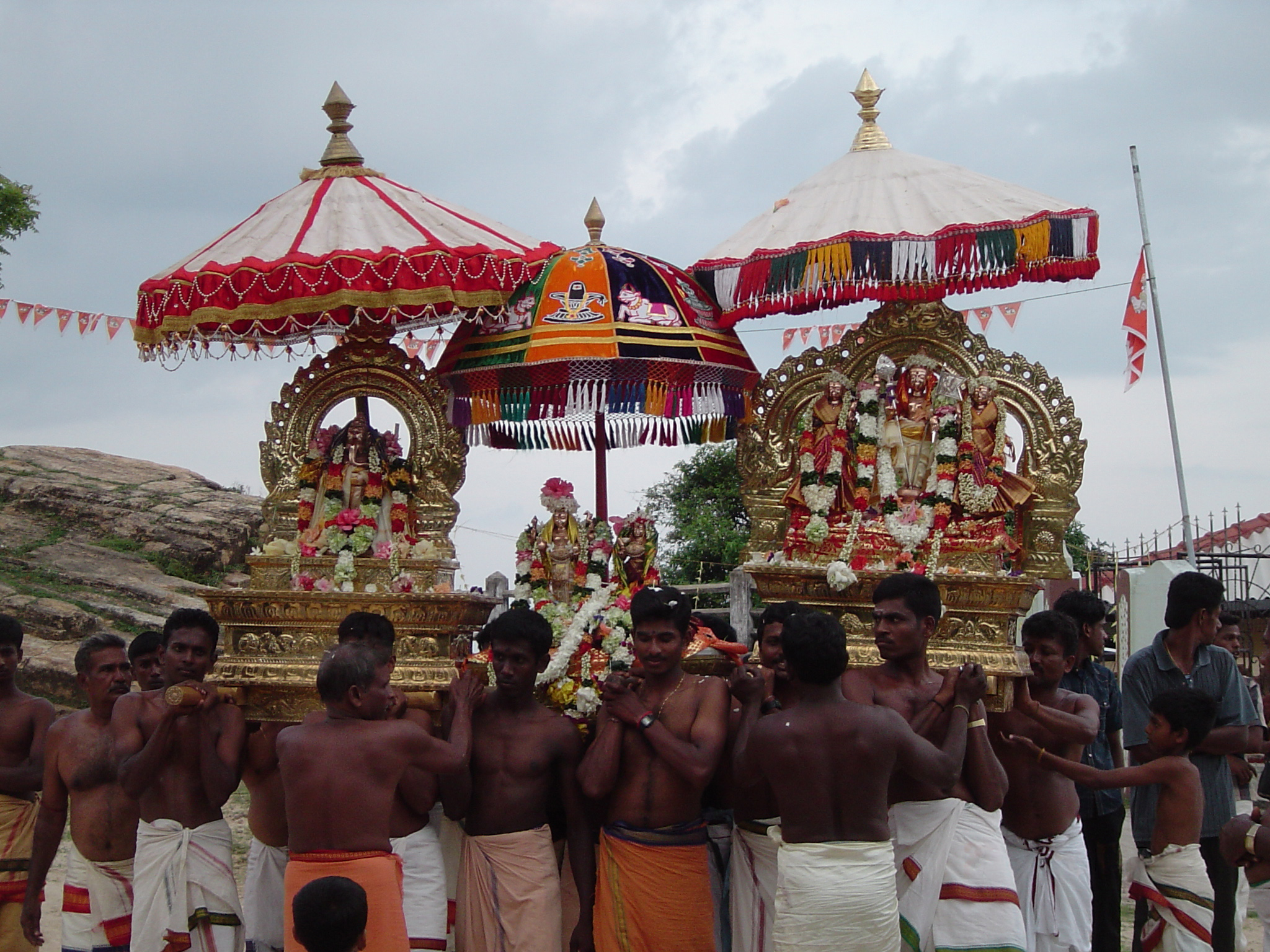
Procession of Koneswaram idol pooja in Trincomalee city

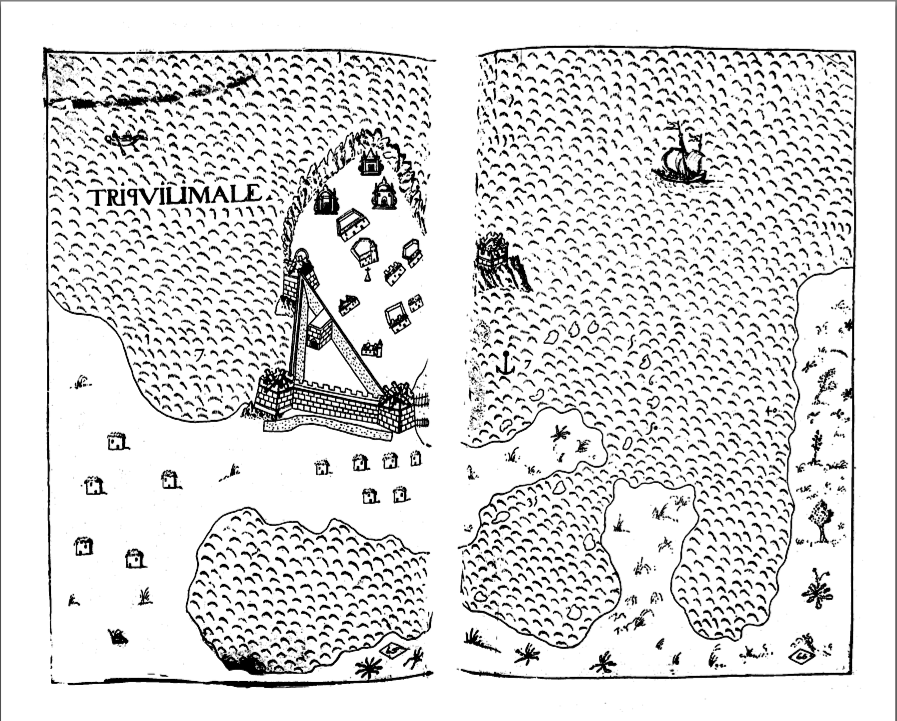
Antonio Bocarro's 1635 map of temples of Trincomalee promontory.

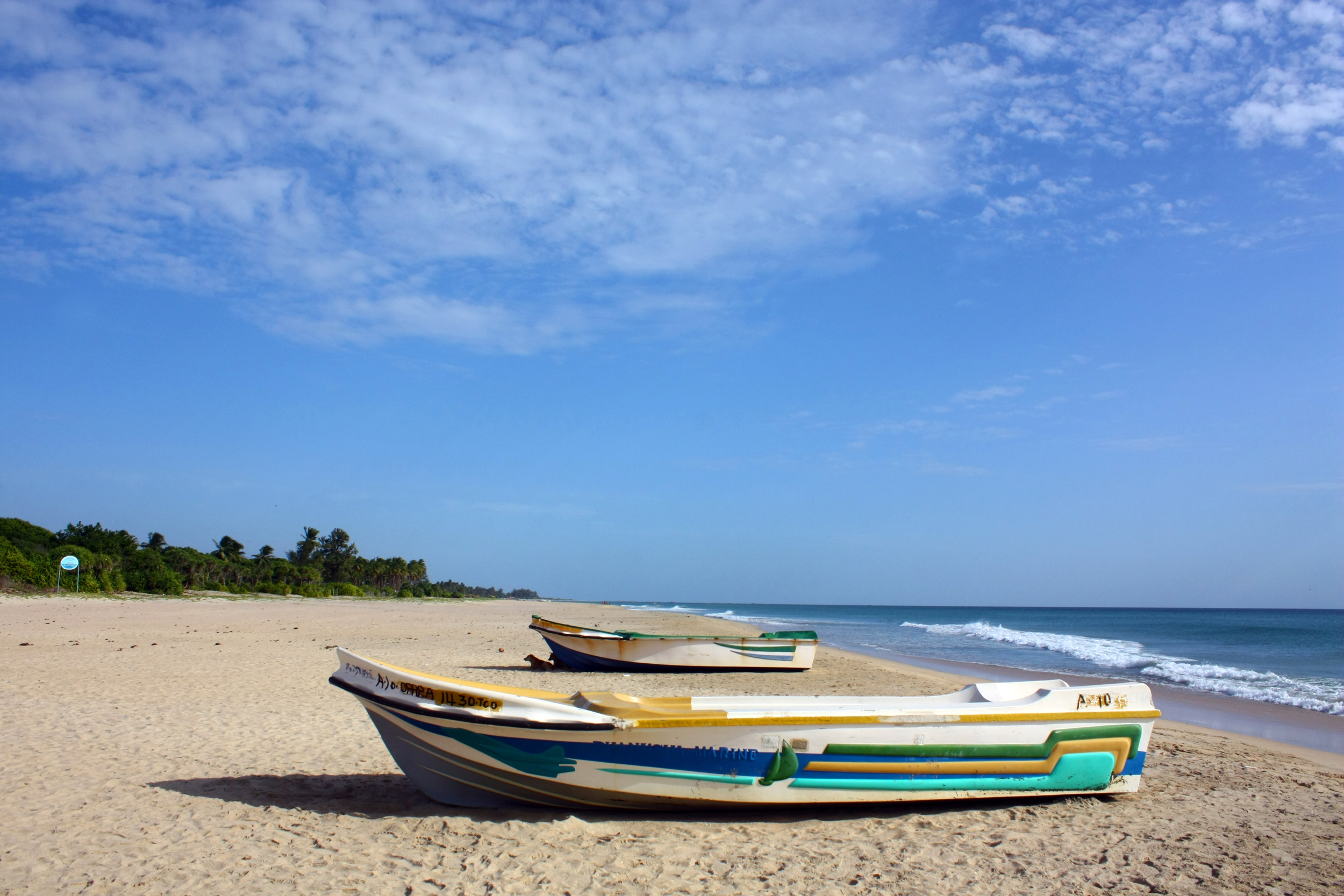
Nilaveli Beach just north of the city, near where one of the earliest stone inscriptions mentioning the holy city was discovered

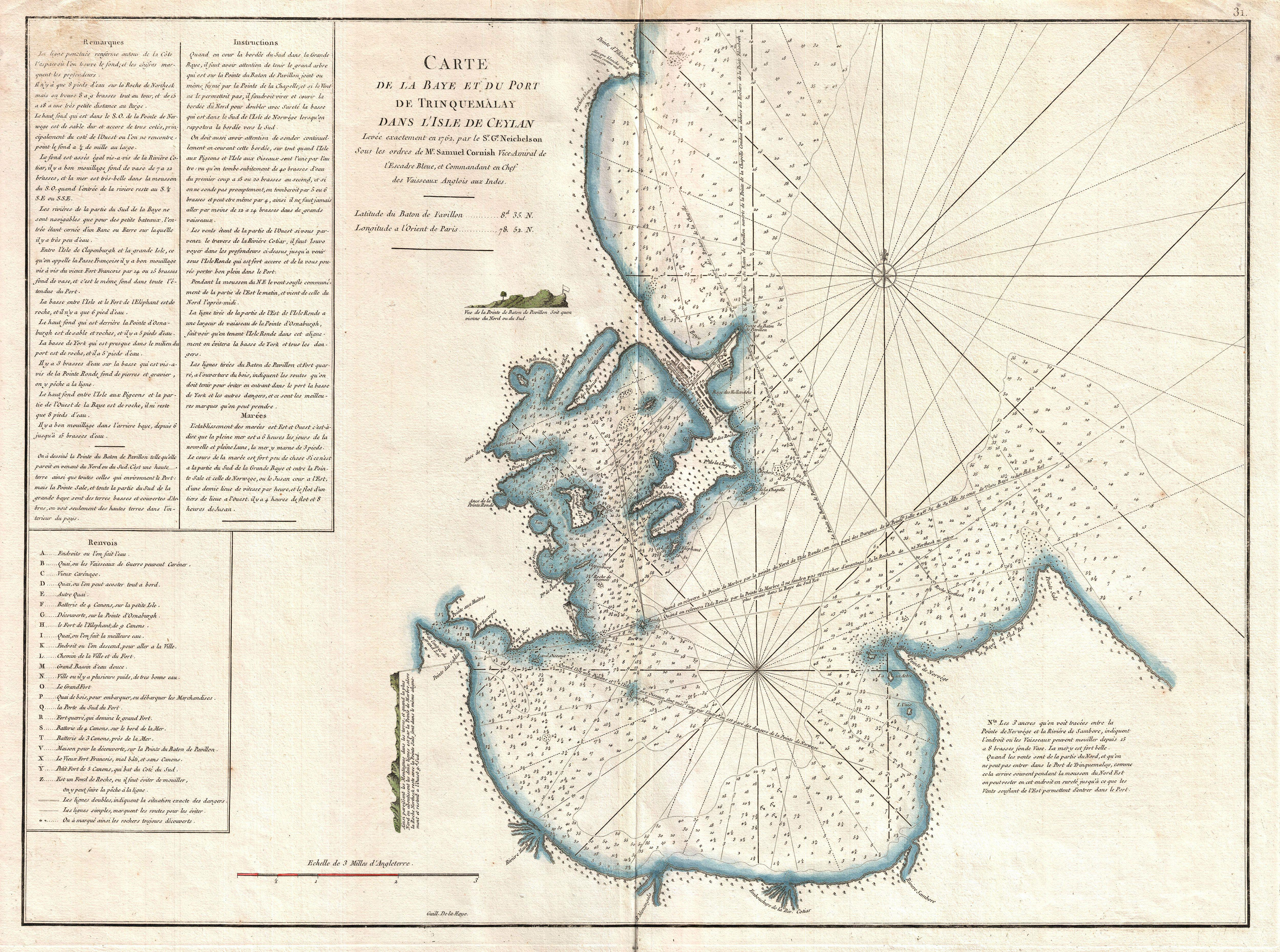
1775 Mannevillette Map of Trincomalee

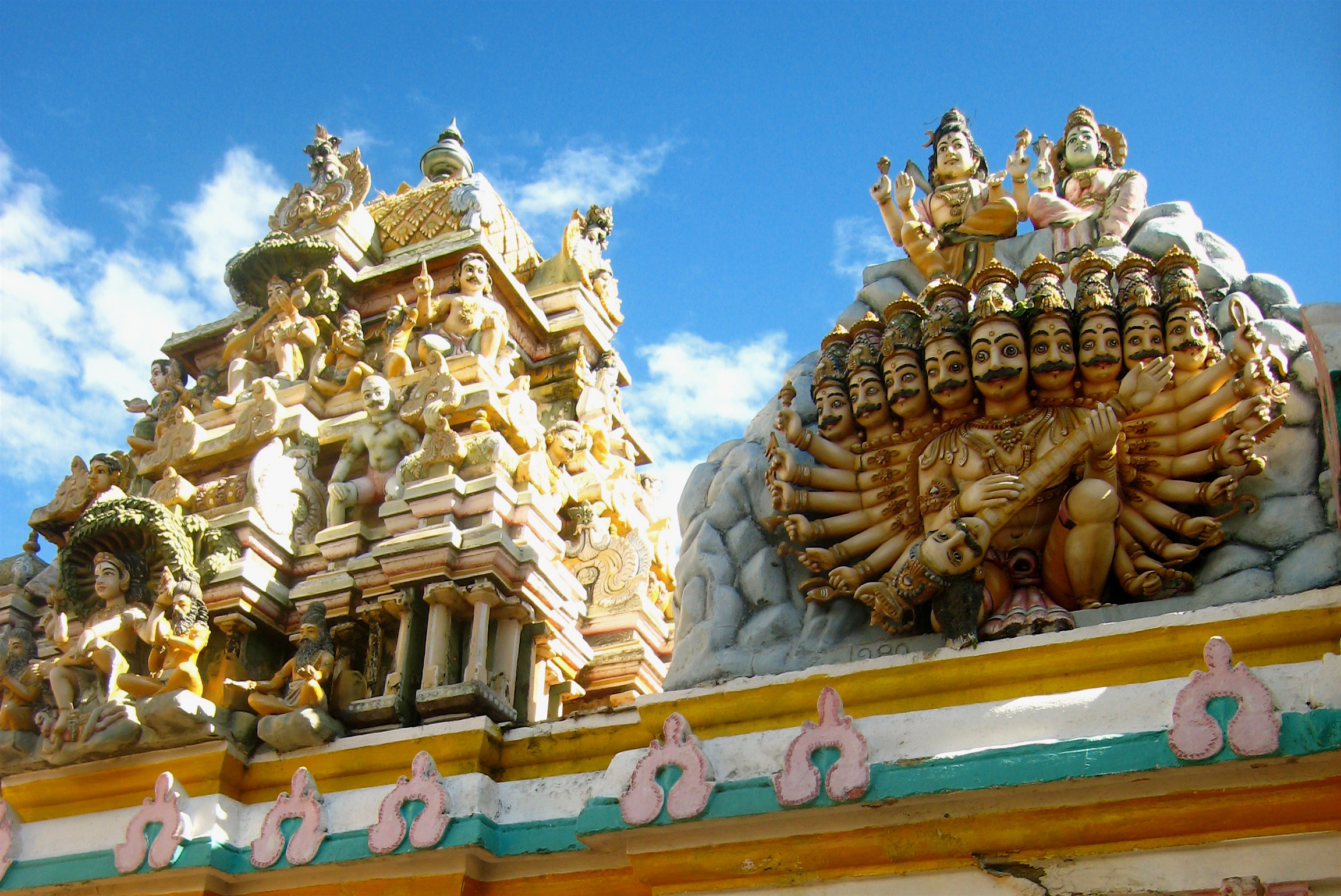
Koneswaram temple shrine, Trincomalee

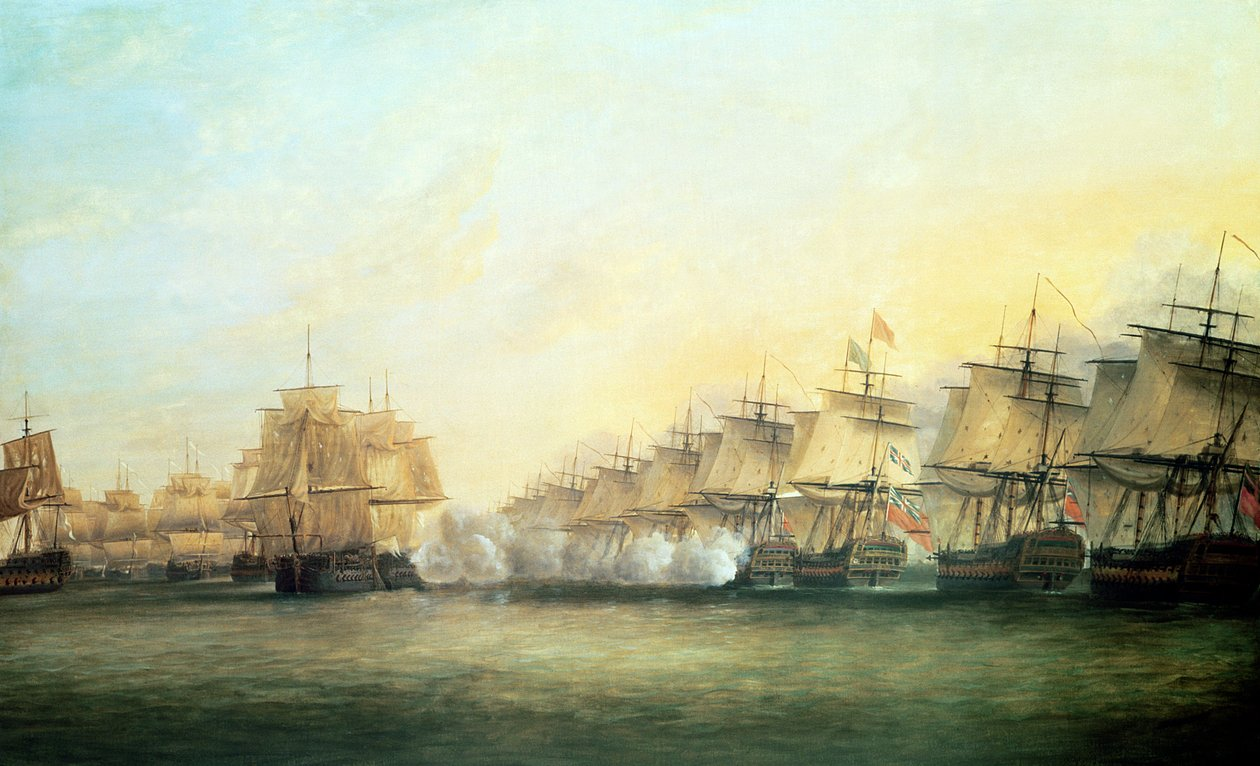
Battle of Trincomalee

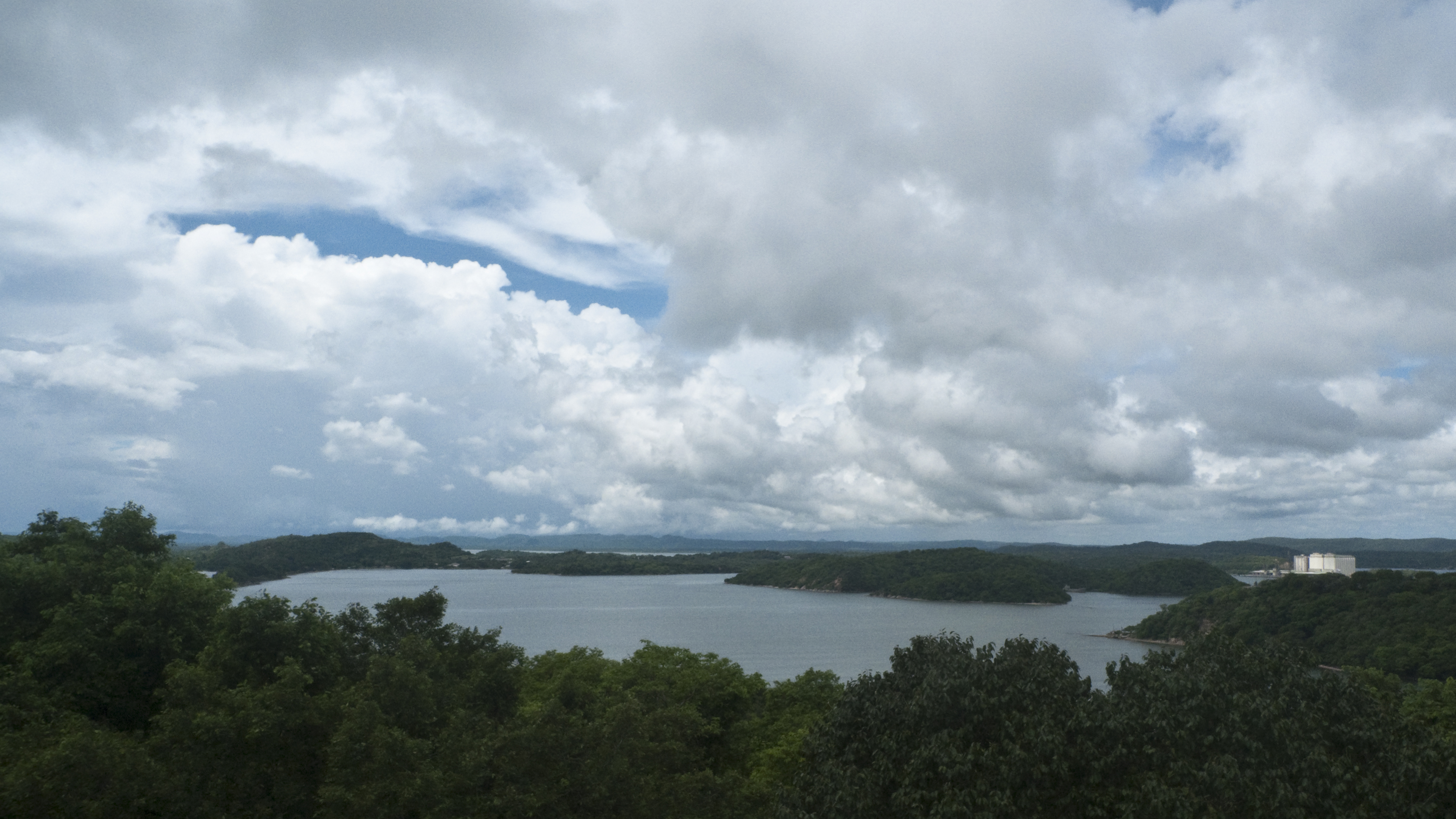
Prima Flour Factory to the right, Trincomalee city

Trincomalee which is a natural deep-water harbour has attracted seafarers, trader and pilgrims from Europe, Middle East, Africa, China, East Asia and Australasia since ancient times. Trinco, as it is commonly called, has been a seaport since 400 BCE. The earliest epigraphical inscriptions found in Trincomalee city are in the Tamil language. The Tamil settlement at the port of Trincomalee was one of the oldest settlements on the island. One inscription from 900 to 1000 CE belonging to the Chola Dynasty excavated near where the promontory's first temple stood is from a sluice and also concerns Koneswaram, as do the 10th century Nilaveli inscriptions.

Ancient texts, as well as an inscription unearthed by archeologists among its Hindu archaeological remains, call it Gokarna in Sanskrit. Over its long history, Trincomalee, and specifically the Swami Rock promontory, has housed several Kovil temples to deities of the Hindu pantheon, as well as a Buddhist vihara and a Christian Catholic church, both introduced following invasions. A descendant of Ellalan of Anuradhapura, Kulakkottan, directed renovations of the Hindu temples and oversaw settlement of Tamils for their upkeep. Sacrificial and other cult practices at the Trincomalee promontory have been documented since the Yakkha period, and were noted during the reigns of Pandukabhaya of Anuradhapura, Maha Naga of Anuradhapura and Manavanna of Anuradhapura until the publication of The Life of Alexander Alexander in 1830. The worship of Eiswara is noted to have been the original worship of the island and the deity worshiped by Kuveni, the ancient Yakkha queen; Charles Pridham, Jonathan Forbes and George Turnour state that it is probable there is no more ancient form of worship existing than that of Eiswara upon his sacred promontory.

In the earliest known literary reference to the Siva temple, Mahabharata, the Hindu epic written between 400 and 100 BCE, the temple of Gokarna Bay is in the middle of the ocean and is the island shrine of Uma's consort, known in the three worlds and worshiped by all natives of the island including the Nagas, Yakkhas, Siddhars and Devas, peoples from the subcontinent, the rivers, ocean and mountains. Fasting there for three nights in worship of Siva as Ishana, one acquireth the merit of the horse-sacrifice, and the status of Ganapatya. By staying there for twelve nights, one's soul is cleansed of all sins. Mahabharata continues that the shrine is the next pilgrimage spot for Hindus en route south following Kanyakumari of the early Pandyan kingdom and Tamraparni island (Kudiramalai). In the same time period, the Ramayana in written form describes how King Ravana and his mother had worshipped Siva at the shrine, when the former wanted to remove the temple of Koneswaram when his mother was in ailing health around 2000 BCE. This literature continues that as the king was heaving the rock, Lord Siva made him drop his sword. As a result of this a cleft was created on the rock, today called Ravana Vettu – meaning Ravana's Cleft. Upon her death, her last rites were performed at the Kanniya Hot water springs in the Kanniya suburb of Trincomalee city.

The Siva-worshipping Siddhar Patanjali's birth at the city in 180 BCE and its connections to another Siddhar Agastya from at least the 5th–4th century BCE suggests that Yoga Sun Salutation originated on the promontory of Trincomalee. One of Trincomalee's suburbs, Kankuveli is home to ruins of the Tamil Siddhar medical university established by Agastya, the "Agathiyar Thapanam", which alongside his other shrines at Sivan Oli Padam Malai, helped spread Tamraparniyan science across the continent during the pre-classical era. The Vayu Purana refers to the Siva temple on Trikuta hill on the eastern coast of Lanka once again in the 3rd century. Another mention is found in the 5th century CE Mahavamsa where King Vijaya brought his nephew Panduvasdeva to land at the bay in the 4th century BC. The Yalpana Vaipava Malai asserts that Vijaya restored the Koneswaram temple and the other four Eswarams upon arrival. Mahasena of Anuradhapura, according to the Mahavamsa and the later Culavamsa, destroyed the devalaya temple compound in Trincomalee housing Siva lingas in it, and built a Mahayana Buddhist edifice in its stead. He destroyed the Hindu temple to appease monks of the Anuradhapura Maha Viharaya who themselves had been antagonized by Mahasen. He worked under the tutelage of Sangamitta, the Tamil Buddhist monk from the early Chola country, who had intervened to avenge the persecution of Vetullavada adherents during the Tamraparniyan Abhayagiri versus Maha Viharaya sectarianism in Anuradhapura. This explains some of the Buddhist archeological remains in the region. By the reign of Silakala Ambosamanera of Anuradhapura, Trincomalee bay again is mentioned as the furthest spot down the river Mahavalli Ganga which must be protected from "the enemy in Rohana"; and Trincomalee is noted as a theatre of magic, where Naga snakes were manifested to foretell the consecration of Maha Naga of Anuradhapura. It was not long before the Siva temple's concurrent re-establishment on the promontory by the 6th century following the rise of the Pallava dynasty. The Mattakallappu Manmiyam of Batticaloa confirms Trincomalee's sacred status for all Hindus.

=== Middle Ages ===
Early Tamil dynasties continued to employ the city as the prefectural capital of the Trincomalee District, allowing administrative duties to be handled by elected Vanniar chiefs. Inscriptions of Kassapa IV, Udaya III and Mahinda IV of Anuradhapura, reveal that lands and villages of Tamils in the island's northeast were prospering, particularly following Srimara Srivallabha's intervention against Sena I of Anuradhapura. The Pallava kings, including Simhavishnu and Narasimhavarman I were important in the early history of Trincomalee because of the increased significance of the city to Hinduism and trade in the early centuries of the common era, making sure to contribute elements of their unique style of Dravidian architecture to the city. During the reign of Mahendravarman I in 600, as one Aggabodhi II of Anuradhapura took steps to attack the Vanniar chiefs between Trincomalee and Mannar, Tevaram hymns were composed on the two holy cities, one of which, written by Sambandar, lauded the deity of the temples in each and lamented the schemes of other heretical faiths encroaching on Trincomalee. Mahendravarman I gave much assistance and military aid to his friend Manavanna of Anuradhapura, and he proceeded to build a twin temple called Kokarneswarar Temple, Thirukokarnam in Pudukkottai, Tamil Nadu.

Following the conquest of Parantaka I in 950, Rajaraja Chola I and Rajendra Chola I oversaw the city's development when under their empire. A significant expansion of the Bhadrakali Amman Temple, Trincomalee by Rajendra Chola I increased pilgrimage to the city. Trincomalee was used by Chola king Ilankesvarar Tevar as his eastern port in the 11th century and prospered under the Vannimai chieftaincies of the Jaffna kingdom. Two powerful merchant guilds of the time – the Manigramam and the Five Hundred Lords of Ayyavolu emerged in the region during Chola trade with the far east and the conquest of Srivijaya of the Malay Archipelago.

The Koneswaram temple compounds, the city and its adjacent region, from Periyakulam and Manankerni in the north, Kantalai and Pothankadu in the west, and Verugal in the south, formed a great Saiva Tamil principality of the island's state Mummudi Chola Mandalam. Residents in this collective community were allotted services, which they had to perform at the Koneswaram temple. A Jain sect in Nilaveli had even complained to Gajabahu II about the priests of Koneswaram. Following some benefaction of the shrine by Gajabahu II, his successor King Parakramabahu I used Trincomalee as his eastern port, to launch a successful invasion of Burma in the 12th century. Kalinga Magha used the city as a garrison point during his rule. The city was governed by Jatavarman Sundara Pandyan I and Jatavarman Veera Pandyan I of the Pandyans in the 13th century, despite invasions from and the eventual subduing of Chandrabhanu and Savakanmaindan of Tambralinga of Thailand; it then remained in the Pandyan empire of Maravarman Kulasekara Pandyan I and remnants of Pandyan art and architecture still stand in Trincomalee.

Magha's reign ousted Parakrama Pandyan II and re-consolidated Tamil sovereign power in the island's north, north west and north east in Trincomalee by 1215; during Magha's reign, the temple and city underwent rich development in the name of a Chodaganga Deva on Puthandu, 1223. After the fall of the Pandyans of Tamilakam due to invasions by Muhammad bin Tughluq of the Delhi Sultanate, Trincomalee rose in status in the Jaffna kingdom, often visited by King Singai Pararasasegaram and his successor King Cankili I in the following centuries.

Trincomalee served a similar purpose to its west coast sister city, Mannar. King Jeyaveera Cinkaiariyan had the traditional history of the Koneswaram temple compiled as a chronicle in verse, titled Dakshina Kailasa Puranam, known today as the Sthala Puranam of Koneswaram Temple. Mariners were particularly excited when observing the massive shrine from afar in the sea. Building blocks from the city were used to expand the Kovil at Rameswaram under the patronage of king Gunaveera Cinkaiariyan. At this time, Trincomalee was trading pearls, precious stones, vessels, elephants, muslins, baqam and cinnamon, and was passed by Chinese voyager Ma Huan by ship, eight days from the Nicobar islands, on his way to Tenavaram temple. The Tamil country had established a strong alliance with Yemen and the Delhi Sultinate under Martanda Cinkaiariyan which attracted seafaring merchants from East Africa and the Middle East to its ports. An inlet of Trincomalee, Nicholson Cove became the site of a small Arab settlement by the 13th and 14th century. The Nicholson Cove Tombstone inscriptions at Trincomalee refer to the deceased as the daughter of the chief Badriddin Husain Bin Ali Al-Halabi, showing that her family hailed from Halab (Aleppo) in Syria. The Tamil Bell of New Zealand assigned to the Pandyan era belonged to sea traders that likely originated from Trincomalee. The city even attracted Arunagirinathar in 1468, who traversed the Pada Yatra pilgrimage route from Nallur Kandaswamy temple to Katirkamam while stopping to pay homage to Koneswaram's Murukan shrine.

By the late 16th century, Portuguese Ceylon was beginning to influence the operations of the now princely Trincomalee district. Despite it being one of the smaller states of the island, given as an appenage to younger sons of royal houses and still being dependent on the Jaffna kingdom, the city had become one of the richest and the most visited place of Hindu worship in the world, declared the "Rome of the Pagans of the Orient" and "Rome of the Gentiles" by the Portuguese. It hosted the Hindu funeral of Bhuvanekabahu VII of Kotte. The death of one of its kings, Vanniana Raja of Trincomalee, left his young son, the Prince of Trincomalee under the guardianship of his uncle. Trincomalee was annexed by Cankili I to bring it back under Jaffna control, forcing the boy king into exile. He was eventually baptised as Raja Alphonsus of Trincomalee and taken under the wing of the missionary Francis Xavier. The rise of Francis Xavier and the migration of Portuguese soldiers to Trincomalee, conversions to Christianity by some residents and royals in the 1500s saw the erection of churches in the city. Koneswaram is described by Jesuit priests at this time as being a "... massive structure, a singular work of art. It is of great height, constructed with wonderful skill in blackish granite, on a rock projecting into the sea, and occupies a large space on the summit".

The Trincomalee and Batticaloa chiefdoms starting paying direct tributes to the Portuguese commander in Mannar from 1582 as Portuguese influence over the entire North east gained momentum. An annual sum of 1280 fanams was levied from the Koneswaram temple, and they collected a duty on areca nuts exported through the Trincomalee and Batticaloa ports. Jaffna had given minimal logistical access to its Trincomalee and Batticaloa seaports to the Kandyan kingdom to secure military advantages against its enemies; this was used by their influential European overlords to consolidate power in the region. In 1603, the first Dutch fleet arrives at Trincomalee and Batticaloa ports.

In 1612, D. Hieronymo de Azevedo, after great difficulties due to torrential rains, arrived at Trincomalee with a Portuguese contingent from Kandy. Here de Azevedo "was keen on building a fort" to the scope; he called in aid from King Ethirimana Cinkam of Jaffna but not seeing him, he abandoned the enterprise and he marched towards Jaffna. The early death of Cankili I brought upon by the Portuguese conquest of the Jaffna kingdom saw all the territory of the kingdom of Jaffna, comprising both Trincomalee and Batticaloa, assigned to the "spiritual cures of the Franciscans". The Jesuits followed the Portuguese soldiers to Trincomalee and Batticaloa when they occupied the two localities.

=== Early modern ===
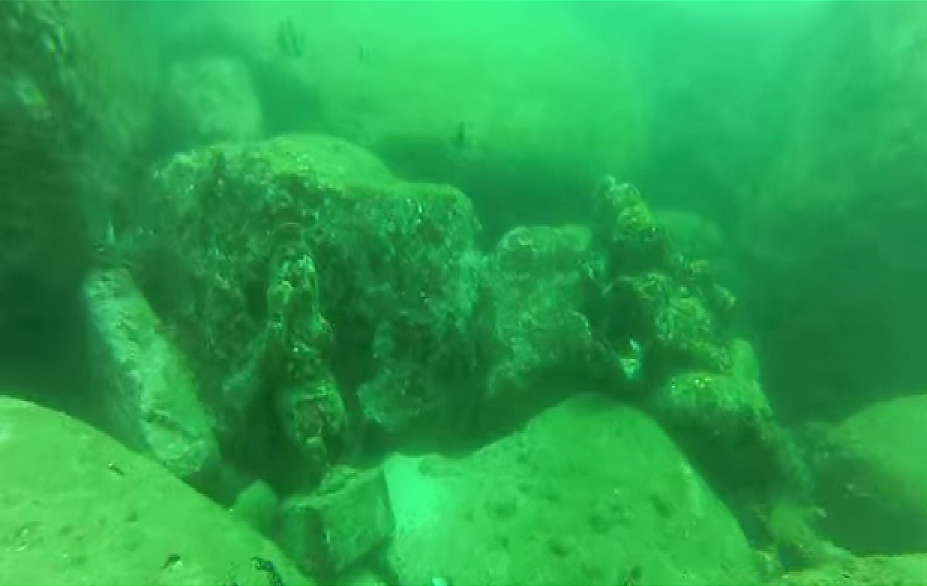
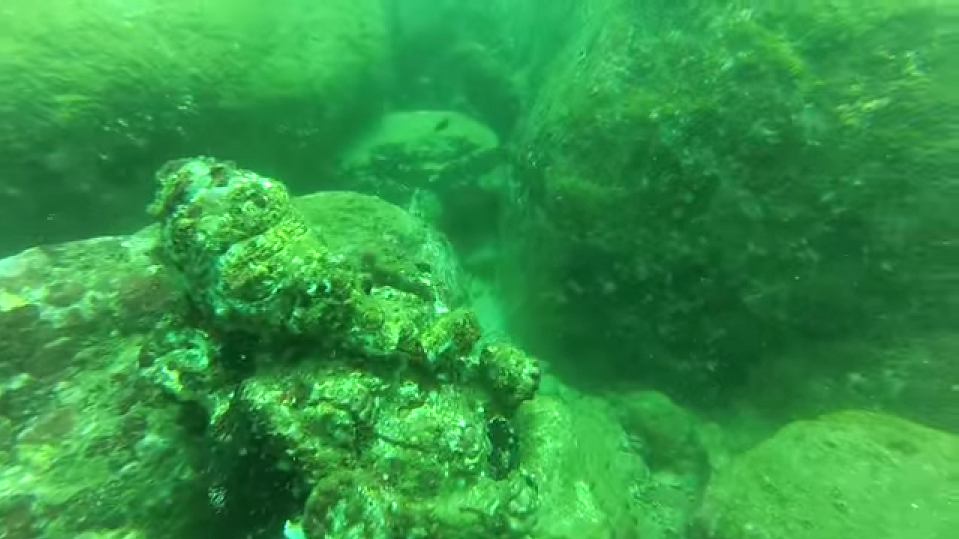
Underwater ruins of the Koneswaram temple include statues of the popular Hindu god Ganesh

The buildings of Trincomalee were of masonry, thatched with leaves of bamboo and rattan, although the Pagodas and the Palace of the King were covered with copper, silver and gold. The metropolis had grown with well-built houses and streets that were cleaned regularly and were well adorned. The Danish arrived in Trincomalee at the end of 1619 with a first ship, called "Øresund" under the command of Roelant Crape. This small expedition was the vanguard of another Danish fleet, composed of four vessels and 300 soldiers, commanded by Ove Giedde, that reached the island in May 1620. They wanted to try their fortune in the Asian seas; the Danish expedition occupied Koneswaram temple. It was here that the Danes began the works for the fortification of the peninsula.

Following the destruction of the Koneswaram compound and the Fort of Triquinimale built from its ruins, Trincomalee had a Portuguese force during the reign of Rajasinghe II of Kandy. Constantino de Sá de Noronha who destroyed one of the temples had a copy of the oldest inscription in Tamil Brahmi sent to Portugal for the purpose of identification. The Tamil inscription contains a prophecy on the city and its temple, a copy of which was sent and is retained in The Hague. In a 1638 letter to Dutch Colonial Governor Anthony van Diemen, an officer mentions that Trincomalee is a "fort built rather strongly of hard stones from an old pagoda round the hillock. On each side there is a sandy and rocky bay and it is like a peninsula". Rajasinghe finally formed an alliance with the Dutch, who captured the Fort of Triquinimale in 1639 and handed it to the Kandyans for destruction in 1643. In 1660, the Dutch built the present Fort Fredrick at the foot of the promontory which they called Pagoda Hill, and another fort at the mouth of the harbour home to Dutch officers, Fort Ostenburg. An English sea captain and his son, the writer named Robert Knox, came ashore by chance near Trincomalee and were captured and held in captivity by the Kandyan king in 1659. The Kandyans then pursued a scorched earth policy to try and oust the Dutch and take Trincomalee and Batticaloa on the east coast. The French set up base in Trincomalee in the Spring of 1672, and tried to make overtures to the Kandyans, but an alliance was not sealed; by July 1672, Trincomalee was retaken by the Dutch fleet.

The city had rejoined the Coylot Vanni Country by the start of the 18th century, with much of the city's population having moved across the district following the temple's destruction. It was about three centuries after Norochcho and Knox that serious attempts at translating the temple's ancient writings were made. The Dutch ruled the Tamil country with increased focus on districts like the Vannimai, Trincomalee and Batticaloa; the Vanniar chiefs of Trincomalee and the rest of the Vanni became subordinates and were put back under the commandment of Jaffna with a large degree of autonomy, but forced to pay forty elephants a year to the Dutch company. As tributaries, they recovered from Portuguese rule slowly under Dutch rule, and the Batticaloa district served as a dependency of the Fort of Trincomalee until 1782. The state of the region and the Tamils fears for the town and the Kantalai tank is described in considerable detail by the Dutch Governor of Trincomalee, J. F. Van Senden, in the diary of his visit in June 1786 with a view to revitalising agricultural production around the Trincomalee district. The population was a shadow of what it had been in times of prosperity. What he saw were people who had lost much of their traditional skill and often living close to subsistence level. Van Senden made the first record of the Kankuveli Tamil inscription dealing with a large field dedicated to Koneswaram temple. He was struck by the contrast between the prosperity signified by the inscription and what he then saw in the village. Trincomalee town remained under Vanni administration.

=== Late modern and contemporary ===
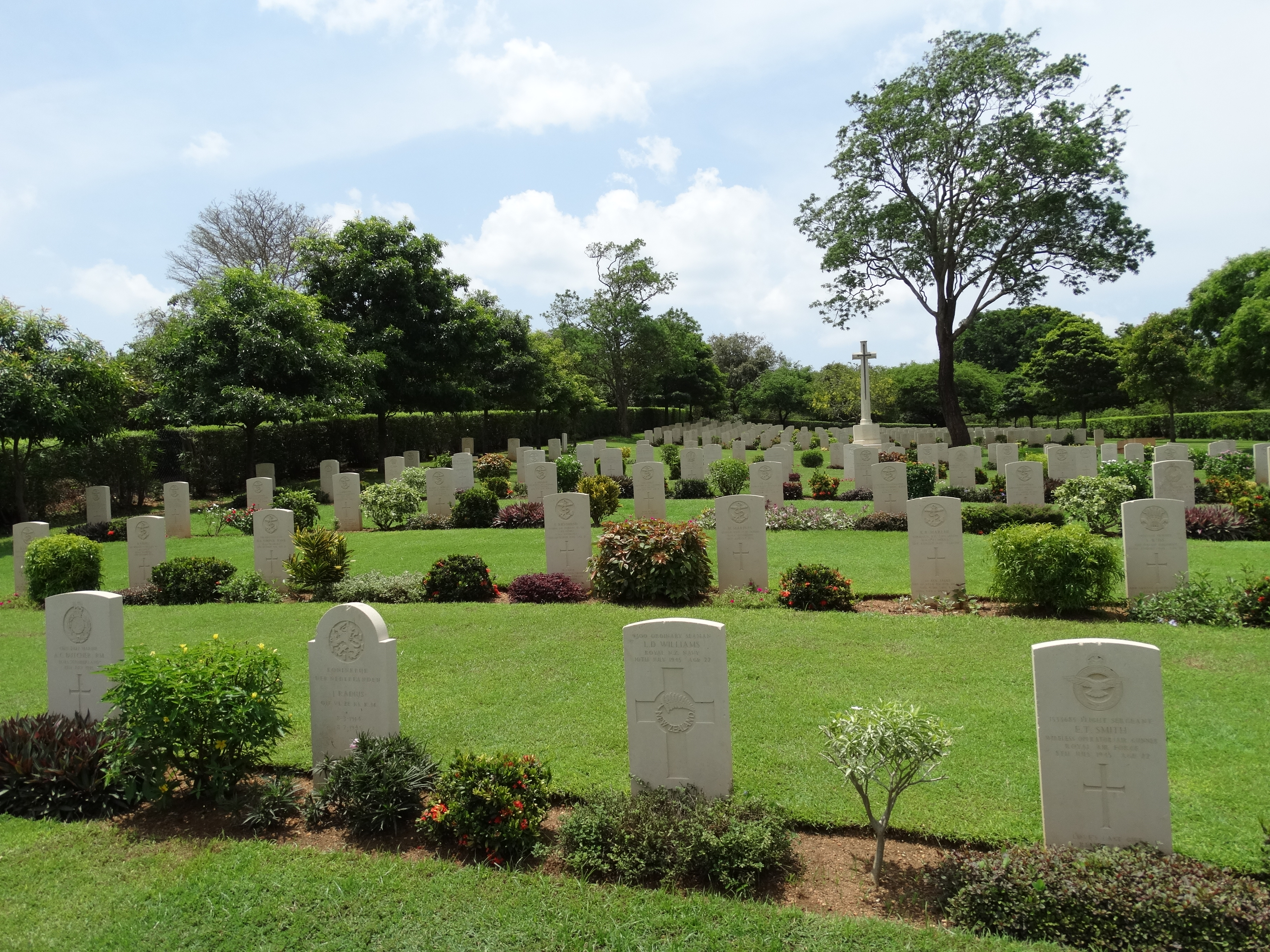
Trincomalee WWII War Cemetery

Jacob Burnand, a Swiss soldier in the service of the Dutch and the Governor of Batticaloa, composed a memoir on his administration there in 1794, noting Trincomalee to be an important fortified town in the Tamil nation. Trincomalee's fort was occupied by the Dutch for most of the 18th century, and subsequently by the French who fought and won the Battle of Trincomalee as part of the American Revolutionary War in 1782 at the city.

On 8 January 1782, the British captured Trincomalee's forts from the Dutch, the first place on the island they captured. The French recaptured it on 29 August of the same year after the Battle of Trincomalee. In 1783 the French ceded it to the British and subsequently, Britain ceded Trincomalee back to the Dutch Republic under the 1783 Peace of Paris. In 1795 the British recaptured the city and held it until Sri Lanka's independence in 1948, with a claimed aim of "preventing Napoleon invading the colony" if left under the Dutch. Their rule is sealed with the Treaty of Amiens, and the last Vanniar, Pandara Vannian is executed by the British – a pension is paid to his widow, the Vannichi, until the late 19th century. The British officer Alexander Johnston discovered a stone epigraph, the oldest of the province of Trincomalee District, in ancient characters concerning the traditional founder of Trincomalee and the temple, Kullakottan Chola. The French admiral Pierre André de Suffren de Saint Tropez, when with his fleet in the city in 1781 had sent a copy of the inscription to Abraham Hyacinthe Anquetil-Duperron of France for translation.

The ship HMS Trincomalee was built during the early 19th century by Indian workers to aid them in the Napoleonic Wars, and named after the city. The importance of Fort Fredrick was due to Trincomalee's natural harbour. Through Trincomalee, it was believed a strong naval force could secure control of India's Coromandel Coast and the rest of the Indian Ocean. The British admiral Horatio Nelson, 1st Viscount Nelson called Trincomalee "the finest harbour in the world", while the British Prime Minister William Pitt the Younger called the city "the most valuable colonial possession on the globe, as giving to our Indian Empire a security which it had not enjoyed from its establishment" and the harbour "the finest and most advantageous Bay in the whole of India". In the 19th century, the Trincomali Channel of British Columbia, Canada was built and named after the city's name. A Tamil press is established in Jaffna in 1820; a report on Trincomalee laments its sorry, poverty-stricken state and recommends 'colonization with intelligent settlers'. By 1827, The Return of the Population 1824 is published, giving the total population figures for Trincomalee as 19,158 – Tamils and among them 317 Sinhalese. The Vanni, counted under Mannar, has 22,536 inhabitants, among them 517 Sinhalese.

Before the Second World War, the British built a large airfield to house their RAF base, called the RAF China Bay and fuel storage and support facilities for the British fleets there. After the fall of Singapore, Trincomalee became the home port of the Eastern Fleet of the Royal Navy, and submarines of the Dutch Navy. Trincomalee harbour and airfield were attacked by a carrier fleet of the Imperial Japanese Navy in April 1942 in the Indian Ocean Raid of the war. However, the installation later served as an important launching point for British naval operations in 1944 and 1945.

One of the places inhabited by the British was Fort Fredrick, now controlled by the Sri Lankan Army. Some of the old buildings in the fort were used as residences, including one previously occupied by the Duke of Wellington. In the early 1950s the British Government built groups of bungalows within the fort specifically for their employees. These bungalows today provide accommodation for the Sri Lankan Army. There was a large Naval Hospital which catered for sick and injured British naval personnel from all over the Indian Ocean and Persian Gulf.

With the turn of the modern era, English authors and poets used Trincomalee as inspiration for literature and poetry and became connected with the city. Arthur C. Clarke, who discovered the temple's underwater ruins with photographer Mike Wilson, described the city and the ruins in Reefs of Taprobane and would go on to write 2001: A Space Odyssey based on his experiences in the city. Trincomalee's Bhadrakali Amman temple provides a setting in Wilbur Smith's novel Birds of Prey. Arthur Conan Doyle's Sherlock Holmes stories feature multiple settings in the city, including in A Scandal in Bohemia and A Singular Affair at Trincomalee. Jane Austen's younger brother, Charles, of the British Royal Navy is buried in Trincomalee.

=== Post independence ===
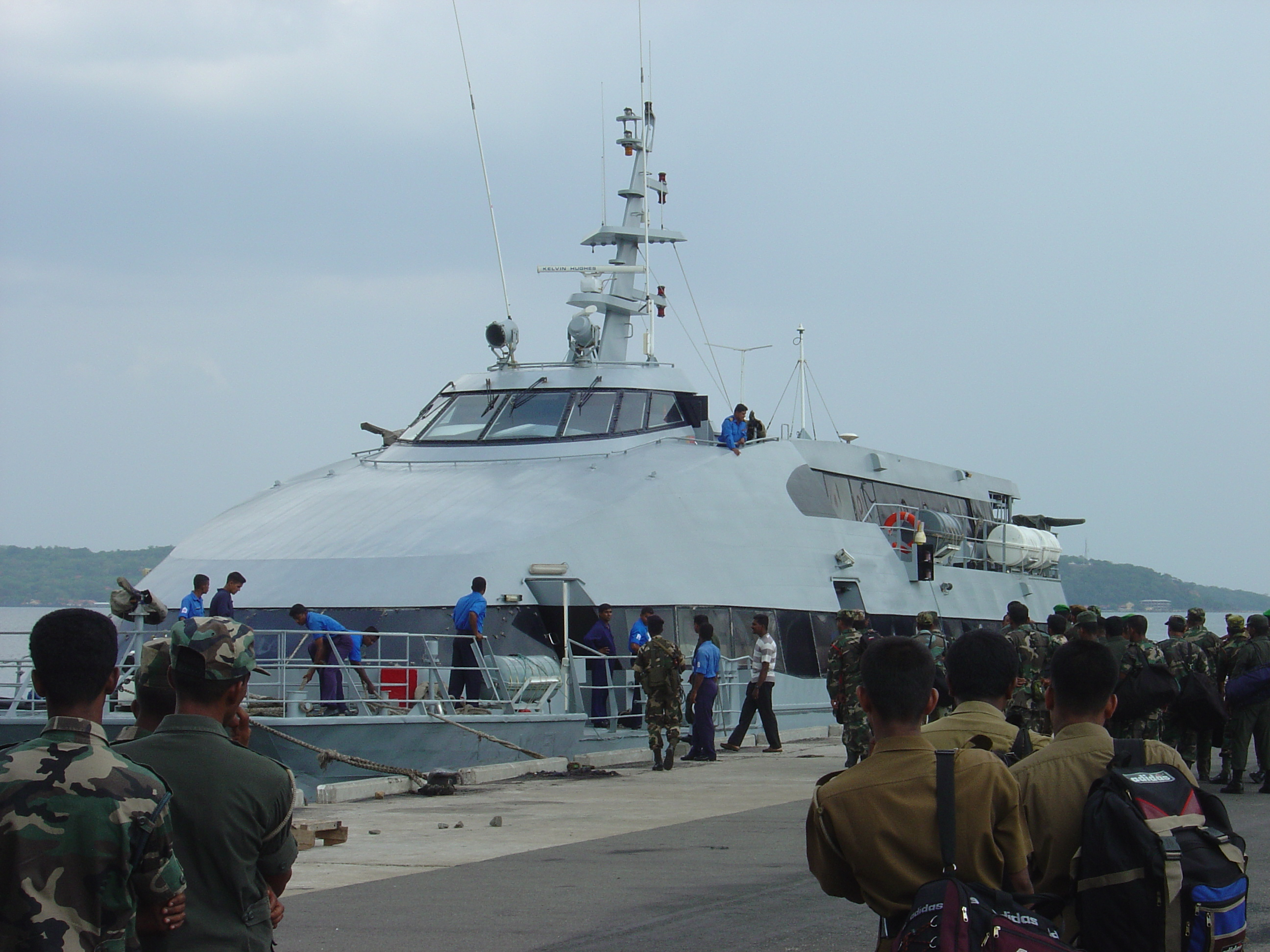
Sri Lankan naval ship at Trincomalee

In 1950, one of the original shrine's gold and copper alloy bronze statues from the 10th century CE of a seated figure of Shiva (in the form of Somaskanda), Shiva as Chandrasekhar, his consort goddess Parvati, a statue of the goddess Mathumai Ambal and later Lord Ganesh were found by the Urban Council of Trincomalee buried 500 yards from the promontory's end while digging for a water well. They were taken in procession around the region before being reinstalled amid opening ceremonies in one of the newly restored shrines of the compound on 3 March 1963. The naval and air bases were taken over by Sri Lanka in 1957. Following independence from Britain, the political relationship between Tamils and Sinhalese deteriorated across the island. Interest surrounding Trincomalee was increased due to its geostrategic position and the discovery of its underwater and land Hindu ruins. In 1968, the unity government of majority Sinhalese dominated United National Party and the minority Tamil dominated ITAK Federal Party collapsed over disagreements about declaring the holy Hindu site a protected area. A committee appointed by a Federal Party Minister to study the viability of declaring the site protected was disbanded without consultation by the prime minister at the time, Dudley Senanayake. The Federal Party withdrew its support to the government following that action. According to journalists like T. Sabaratnam, this incident had severe repercussions alongside the contributing factors of the civil war. The city and its district were severely affected by the 30-year civil war that followed.

In the mid-1980s, India became concerned that the US Navy might gain access to Trincomalee. India was suspicious about goodwill visits by the US Navy to the port and Sri Lankan proposals to contract out the refurbishment of oil storage tanks and modernisation of port facilities at Trincomalee. On 3 March 2023, President Ranil Wickremesinghe instructed the petroleum minister and officials to promptly implement a strategy to revitalize the Trincomalee oil tank farm and integrate it into the nation's economy.

Today SLNS Tissa and SLN Dockyard are used by the Sri Lankan Navy, while the Sri Lanka Air Force is based at China Bay Airport. The Sri Lanka Army has its Security Forces Headquarters - East in Trincomalee. The Trincomalee War Cemetery is one of the six commonwealth war cemeteries in Sri Lanka. It is maintained by Sri Lankan Ministry of Defence on behalf of the Commonwealth War Graves Commission. The base is home to a naval museum called the Hoods Tower Museum. The name refers to a watchtower built on a hill commanding a 360-degree view of the harbor and the bay.

In the aftermath of the 2004 Indian Ocean earthquake and tsunami, Trincomalee was a focal point for relief efforts on the eastern coast of Sri Lanka.

== Historical sites ==
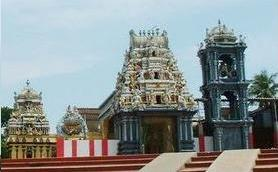
The Koneswaram Temple

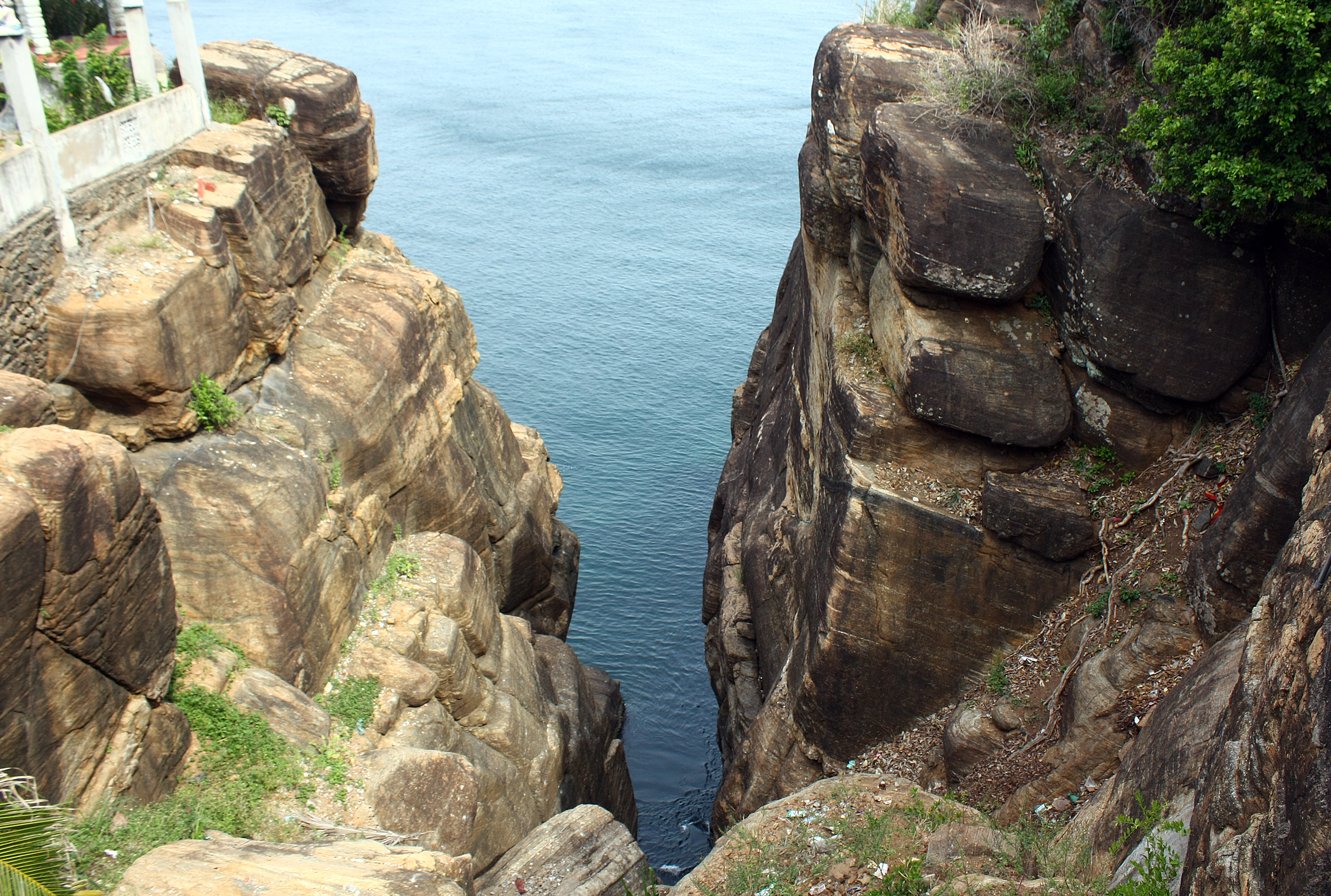
Ravana's Cleft at Swami Rock (Konamalai).

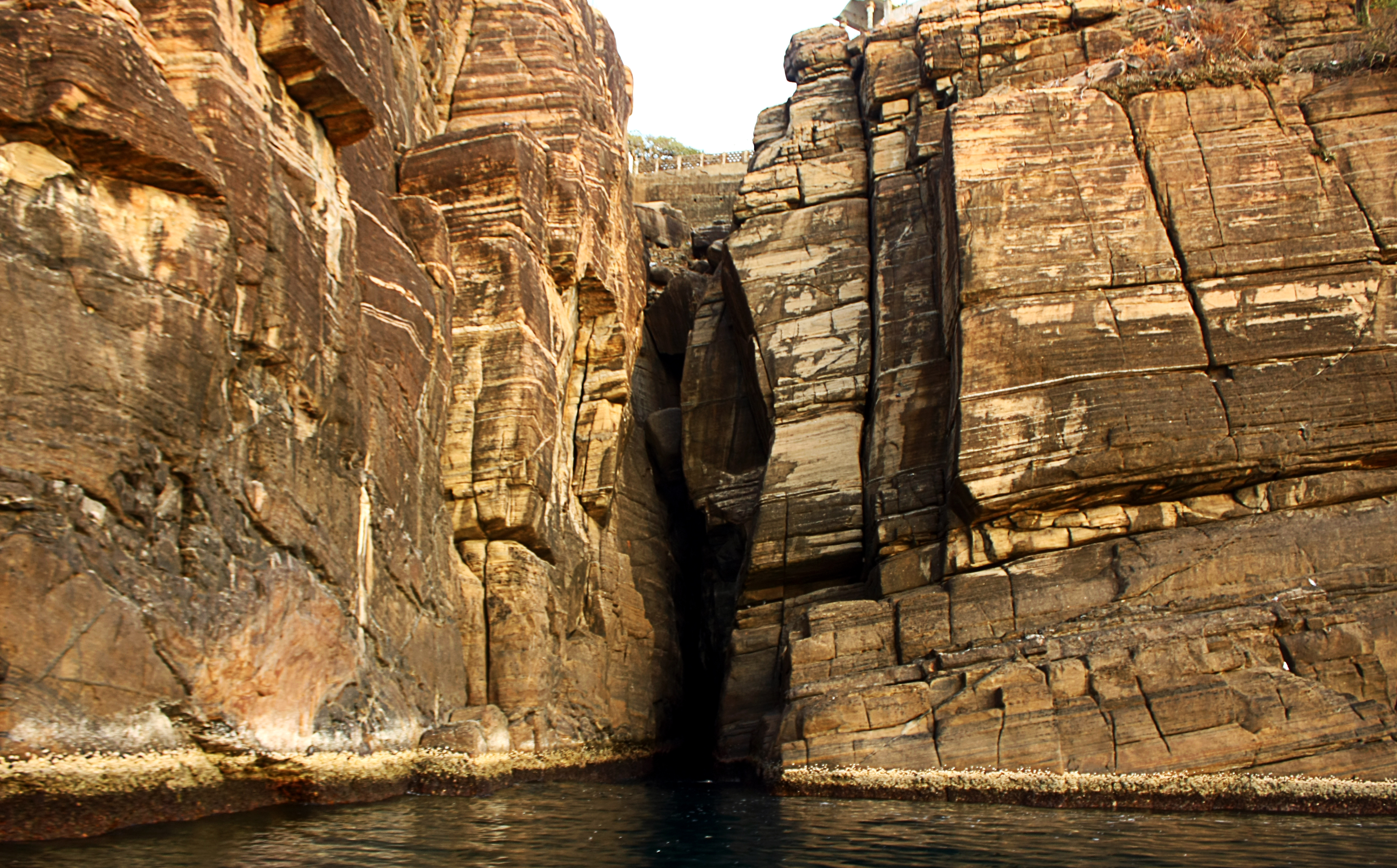
Ravana's Cleft seen from the sea (East).

Koneswaram Temple (left). Ravana's Cleft at Swami Rock (Konamalai) and looks straight down into the ocean below (middle). Ravana's Cleft at Swami Rock seen from sea (right).

Trincomalee is sacred to Sri Lankan Tamils and Hindus around the world. The city has many Hindu sites of historical importance. These sites are sacred to the Hindus and some Buddhists also worship at these Hindu sites.

Prominent sites include the Koneswaram temple compound, its Bhadrakali temple on Konesar Road, and the Salli Muthumariamman Kovil of Uppuveli beach in the Trincomalee suburb of Sambalativu.

=== Hindu historical sites ===
The Koneswaram temple, with a recorded history from the 3rd century BCE and legends attesting to classical antiquity attracted pilgrims from all parts of India. The shrine itself was demolished in 1622 by the Portuguese (who called it the Temple of a Thousand Columns), and who fortified the heights with the materials derived from its destruction. Some of the artifacts from the demolished temple were kept in the Lisbon Museum including the stone inscription by Kulakottan (Kunakottan). The site's ruins include an emblem including two fish and is engraved with a prophecy stating that, after the 16th century, westerners with different eye colours will rule the country for 500 years and, at the end of it, rule will revert to the northerners (Vadukkus. The Hindu temple was also documented in several medieval texts such as the Konesar Kalvettu and the Dakshina Kailasa Puranam.

=== The Dutch Fort ===
The entrance to the roadway leading to Koneswaram is actually the entrance to what used to be Fort Fredrick. The fort was built in 1623 by the Portuguese and captured in 1639 by the Dutch. It then went through a phase of dismantling and reconstruction and was attacked and captured by the British in 1782, during the Fourth Anglo-Dutch War. The French then took it from the British, and handed it back to the Dutch for a large sum of money. In 1795, when the French had occupied the Dutch Republic during the War of the First Coalition, it was again taken over by the British, who named it Fort Frederick.

== Harbour ==
Trincomalee's strategic importance has shaped its recent history. The great European powers vied for mastery of the harbour. The Portuguese, the Dutch, the French, and the British, each held it in turn, and there have been many sea battles nearby.

The harbour, the fifth largest natural harbour in the world, is overlooked by terraced highlands, its entrance is guarded by two headlands, and there is a carriage road along its northern and eastern edges.

=== Oil depot ===
The Royal Navy built the Upper and Lower Tank Farms between 1920 to 1940 to supply fuel for its fleet operating out of its naval base and dockyard in Trincomalee, which was abandoned following the withdrawal of the Royal Navy from Ceylon in 1956. Consisting of over 100 tanks each of the capacity of 75,000 barrels, it had a total capacity of 1 to 1.2 million tonnes of fuel storage. India had been keen to gain access to the disused farm until it secured a secret agreement with the Sri Lankan Government in 1987 and the Indian Oil Corporation later gained ownership of several. In 2015, India and Sri Lanka agreed to develop South Asia's largest oil depot at a port near Trincomalee.

=== Beaches ===
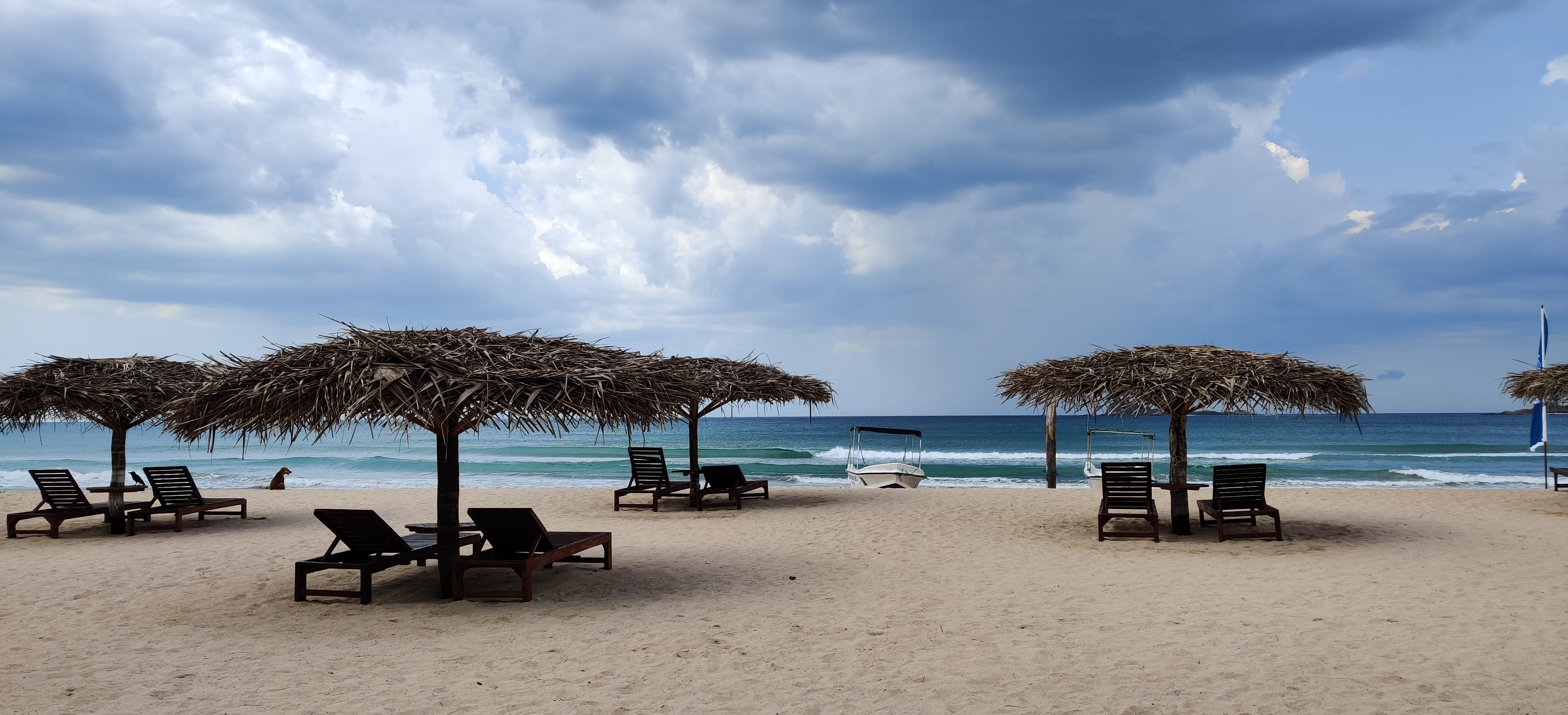
Trincomalee Beach

Trincomalee has some of the most picturesque and scenic beaches found in Sri Lanka, relatively unspoilt and clean. The area is famous for bathing and swimming, owing to the relative shallowness of the sea, allowing one to walk out over a hundred meters into the sea without the water reaching the chest. Whale watching is a common pastime in the seas off Trincomalee, and successful sightings are on the rise with the increase of tourism in the area.

Marble Beach is located 16 km (10 miles) from Trincomalee.

=== Hot springs ===
There are the seven hot springs of Kanniya (Kan = stone; niya = land), on the road to Trincomalee. A high wall bounds the rectangular enclosure which includes all seven springs. Each is in turn enclosed by a dwarf wall to form a well.

== Climate ==
Trincomalee features a tropical wet and dry climate (As) under the Köppen climate classification. The city features a dry season from April through August and a wet season for the remainder of the year. The city sees on average roughly 1,570 millimetres (62 in) of precipitation annually. Average temperatures in Trincomalee range from around 26 °C (79 °F) in December and January to approximately 30 °C (86 °F) during the warmest months of the year from April through September. Extreme temperatures in the city range from 16.5 °C (61.7 °F) on 9 December 2022 to 39.8 °C (103.6 °F) on 13 May 1890.

Climate data for Trincomalee (1991–2020)
Month	Jan	Feb	Mar	Apr	May	Jun	Jul	Aug	Sep	Oct	Nov	Dec	Year
Record high °C (°F)	34.8 (94.6)	35.4 (95.7)	39.2 (102.6)	39.0 (102.2)	39.8 (103.6)	39.5 (103.1)	39.0 (102.2)	39.4 (102.9)	39.5 (103.1)	38.7 (101.7)	36.2 (97.2)	33.4 (92.1)	39.8 (103.6)
Mean daily maximum °C (°F)	28.9 (84.0)	30.1 (86.2)	31.7 (89.1)	33.4 (92.1)	35.2 (95.4)	35.4 (95.7)	35.3 (95.5)	35.3 (95.5)	34.8 (94.6)	32.4 (90.3)	29.8 (85.6)	28.8 (83.8)	32.6 (90.7)
Daily mean °C (°F)	26.5 (79.7)	27.2 (81.0)	28.2 (82.8)	29.5 (85.1)	30.6 (87.1)	30.9 (87.6)	30.6 (87.1)	30.3 (86.5)	30.1 (86.2)	28.5 (83.3)	26.9 (80.4)	26.3 (79.3)	28.8 (83.8)
Mean daily minimum °C (°F)	24.0 (75.2)	24.3 (75.7)	24.8 (76.6)	25.5 (77.9)	26.2 (79.2)	26.3 (79.3)	25.8 (78.4)	25.5 (77.9)	25.1 (77.2)	24.5 (76.1)	24.0 (75.2)	23.8 (74.8)	25.0 (77.0)
Record low °C (°F)	18.5 (65.3)	18.2 (64.8)	19.5 (67.1)	19.0 (66.2)	19.1 (66.4)	20.6 (69.1)	21.2 (70.2)	20.2 (68.4)	18.7 (65.7)	18.7 (65.7)	18.7 (65.7)	16.5 (61.7)	16.5 (61.7)
Average precipitation mm (inches)	152.4 (6.00)	96.1 (3.78)	71.8 (2.83)	54.8 (2.16)	48.1 (1.89)	25.9 (1.02)	51.0 (2.01)	66.6 (2.62)	112.6 (4.43)	215.6 (8.49)	375.6 (14.79)	339.0 (13.35)	1,609.3 (63.36)
Average precipitation days (≥ 1.0 mm)	8.4	4.7	4.0	4.2	4.2	1.9	3.4	4.2	5.7	12.8	17.9	15.0	86.3
Average relative humidity (%) (at Daytime)	75	72	71	70	64	58	60	61	63	71	78	80	69
Mean monthly sunshine hours	257.3	268.4	300.7	279.0	263.5	231.0	235.6	244.9	207.0	217.0	171.0	167.4	2,842.8
Mean daily sunshine hours	8.3	9.5	9.7	9.3	8.5	7.7	7.6	7.9	6.9	7.0	5.7	5.4	7.8
Source 1: NOAA (humidity, 1961–1990)
Source 2: Deutscher Wetterdienst (sun, 1975–1983), Department of Meteorology (records up to 2007)

== Transport and communications ==
=== Road and rail ===
Trincomalee is on the eastern end of the A6 and A12 highways in Sri Lanka, as well as the northern end of the A15.

The city is also served by Sri Lanka Railways. Trincomalee Railway Station is the terminus of Trincomalee-bound rail services, the majority of which originate from Colombo Fort. The station lies close to the northern coast and beaches of the city.

=== Broadcasting ===
German broadcaster Deutsche Welle operated a shortwave and mediumwave relay station in Trincomalee, which was handed over to the Sri Lanka Broadcasting Corporation in 2013. It was not adversely affected by the tsunami of 2004 because of the sea terrain around Trincomalee. Deutsche Welle started broadcasting from Trincomalee Relay Station in 1984. Its transmitter were mostly used by the Adventist World Radio.

== Education ==
The Naval and Maritime Academy of the Sri Lanka Navy and the Air Force Academy of the Sri Lanka Air Force is situated in Trincomalee. It was first established in 1967, and gained university status in 2001. The Eastern University of Sri Lanka, which has its main campus in Batticaloa, also has a campus in Trincomalee.

=== List of schools in Trincomalee city ===
- Methodist Girls' College, Trincomalee
- Orr's Hill Vivekananda College
- R. K. M. Sri Koneswara Hindu College
- Sri Shanmuga Hindu Ladies College
- St. Joseph's College, Trincomalee
- St. Mary's College, Trincomalee
- Vigneshwara Maha Vidyalaya
- Sinhala Central College
- Rajakeeya Vidyaloka Maha Vidyalaya

== See also ==
- Arunagirinagar
- Place names in Sri Lanka
- Trikuta
