= Arunagirinagar =

Village in Trincomalee, Sri Lanka

Coordinates: 8°34′13″N 81°13′57″E

Arunagirinagar (Tamil: அருணகிரிநகர்) is a village administrative division in Trincomalee Town and Gravets in Trincomalee, Sri Lanka. As of 2005 Arunagirinagar consists of 575 families with 2,573 members.

Families	Members	Male	Female	Under 18 Years	18 Years & Over	Buddhist	Hindu	Islam	Christian	Other Religions	Sinhalese	Tamil	Muslim	Others
575	2,573	1,191	1,382	954	1,619	63	1,210	20	1,280	0	82	2,440	20	31
