= Trincomalee Urban Council =

Local authority in eastern Sri Lanka

Type
- Type: Local authority

Leadership
- Chairman: Kanthasamy Selvarajah, TNA since April 2011
- Deputy Chairman: Senathirajah Siriskandarajah, TNA since April 2011
- Secretary: A. G. Devendra
- Seats: 12

Elections
- Last election: 2011 Sri Lankan local government elections

Trincomalee Urban Council (TUC) is the local authority for the city of Trincomalee in eastern Sri Lanka. Trincomalee UC has an extent of nearly 7.8 sq.km. TUC is responsible for providing a variety of local public services including roads, sanitation, drains, housing, libraries, public parks and recreational facilities. It has 12 members elected using the open list proportional representation system.

== History ==
Trincomalee was administered by a Local Board between 1884 and 1933. Between 1933 and 1939 the city administered by a Local Development Board. The city was promoted to an Urban Council on 1 January 1940. Trincomalee is one of the largest cities in Sri Lanka without municipality status. Cities and towns with much lower population than Trincomalee, such as Hambantota (home of President Mahinda Rajapaksa) and Akkaraipattu (home of Local Government Minister A. L. M. Athaullah), have been promoted to Municipal Council in 2011 but Trincomalee has been overlooked.

== Election results ==
=== 1983 local government election ===
Results of the local government election held on 18 May 1983:

Alliances and parties	Votes	%	Seats
Tamil United Liberation Front	10,940	69.58%	9
United National Party	2,542	16.17%	2
Sri Lanka Freedom Party	2,135	13.58%	1
All Ceylon Tamil Congress	106	0.67%	0
Valid Votes	15,723	100.00%	12
Rejected Votes	77		
Total Polled	15,800		
Registered Electors	24,529		
Turnout	64.41%		

Point Pedro didn't have an elected local government for sporadic periods, this was due to various reasons. Aljazeera, the Asiafoundation and the Daily Mirror attribute this to civil war; Reuters and the US State Department attribute this to calls for election boycotts by the LTTE (enforced with brutal reprisals for non-compliance) and the Tamilnet attribute it to The Sri Lankan government's suspension of all local government in the north and east of the country in 1983 using Emergency Regulations. Trincomalee was administered by special commissioners until 1994 when local elections were held. The council was dissolved in 1999. Special commissioners administered the city until the 2006 elections.

=== 2006 local government election ===
Results of the local government election held on 30 March 2006:

Alliances and parties	Votes	%	Seats
Tamil National Alliance (ITAK, EPRLF (S), TELO)	16,368	75.06%	10
Independent (UPFA, UNP, SLMC, NESO)	4,286	19.65%	2
Janatha Vimukthi Peramuna	895	4.10%	0
Eelam People's Democratic Party	259	1.19%	0
Valid Votes	21,808	100.00%	12
Rejected Votes	935		
Total Polled	22,743		
Registered Electors	36,961		
Turnout	61.53%		

The following candidates were elected: Subramaniam Gowrimuhunthan (TNA), 6,115 preference votes (pv); Kanthasamy Selvarajah (TNA), 5,994 pv; Kandiah Thurairajah (TNA), 5,400 pv; Jeganathan Pulendraraj (TNA), 5,027 pv; Perumal Muniayandy (TNA), 2,717 pv; Sithiravelu Arudchelvam (TNA), 2,237 pv; Thandayuthapani Karikalan (TNA), 2,099 pv; Ratnasabapathy Navaratnarajah Varathan (TNA), 1,926 pv; Sultan Farook (Ind-UPFA), 1,650 pv; Abdul Hussein Sahul Hameed (TNA), 1,516 pv; Kanmany Amma Ratnavadivel (TNA), 1,294 pv; and Nahoor Noor Mohamed (Ind-UNP), 1,286 pv.

Subramaniam Gowrimuhunthan (TNA) and Kanthasamy Selvarajah (TNA) were appointed Chairman and Deputy Chairman respectively.

The term of the council was due to expire in 2010 but on 22 December 2009 Minister of Local Government and Provincial Councils Janaka Bandara Tennakoon extended it until 31 March 2011.

Subramaniam Gowrimuhunthan (TNA) and Kanmany Amma Ratnavadivel (TNA) were suspended from their party for contesting the 2010 parliamentary election for the Tamil National People's Front (against the TNA). Subramaniam Gowrimuhunthan (TNA) was subsequently removed from the Chairmanship in August 2010 and replaced by Kanthasamy Selvarajah (TNA).

=== 2011 local government election ===
Results of the local government election held on 17 March 2011:

Alliances and parties	Votes	%	Seats
Tamil National Alliance (ITAK, EPRLF (S), TELO, PLOTE, TULF, TNLA)	11,601	59.43%	8
United People's Freedom Alliance (SLFP, EPDP, et al.)	4,137	21.19%	2
United National Party	2,044	10.47%	1
Janatha Vimukthi Peramuna	519	2.66%	1
All Lanka Tamil United Front	463	2.37%	0
Independent 1	419	2.15%	0
Tamil Makkal Viduthalai Pulikal	327	1.68%	0
Independent 2	10	0.05%	0
Valid Votes	19,520	100.00%	12
Rejected Votes	560		
Total Polled	20,080		
Registered Electors	31,927		
Turnout	62.89%		

The following candidates were elected: Sithiravelu Arudchelvam (TNA); Dharmarasa Gowrimuhunthan (TNA); P. W. Susantha Jayalath (JVP); Kalirajah Kokulraj (TNA); Galappaththige Saman Kumara (UPFA); Nahoor Noor Mohamed (UPFA); Sivasubramaniam Nandakumar (TNA); Saboordeen Sanoon (UNP); Nagalingam Satheeskanna (TNA); Konamalai Saththiyaseelarajah (TNA); Kanthasamy Selvarajah (TNA); and Senathirajah Siriskandarajah (TNA).

Kanthasamy Selvarajah of TNA and Senathirajah Siriskandarajah of TNA were appointed Chairman and Deputy Chairman respectively.
