= Kanniya Hot Springs =

Thermal Springs in Sri Lanka

Kanniya hot water spring
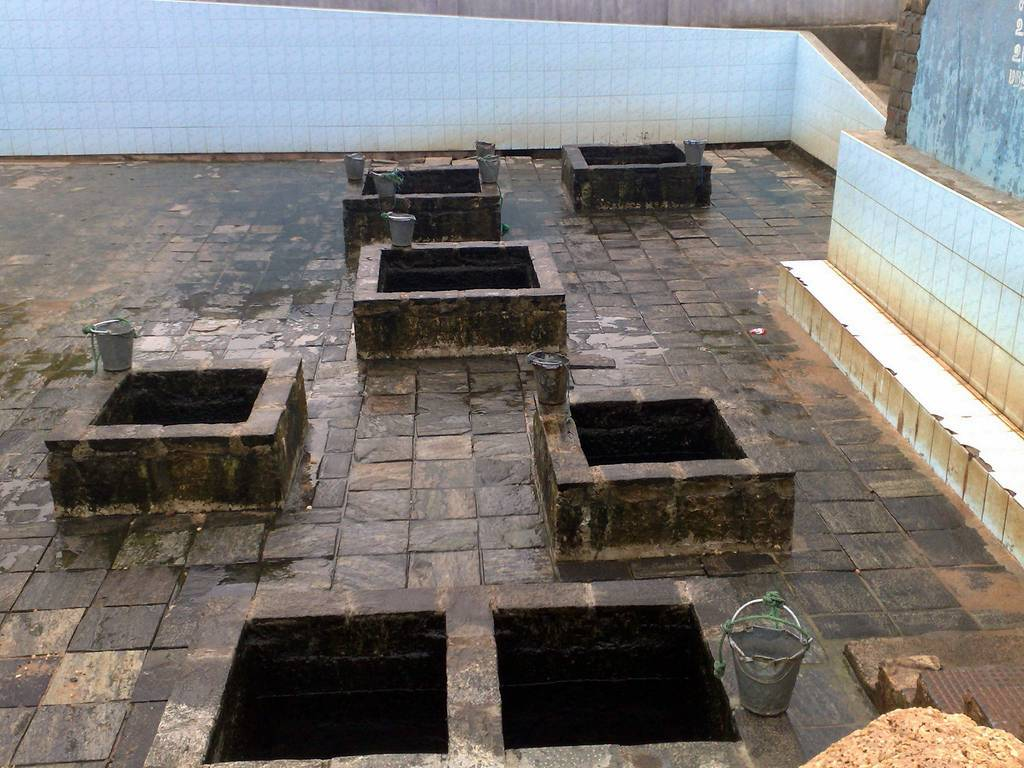
- Interactive map of the Kanniya hot water spring area

General information
- Status: Preserved
- Architectural style: Hot springs
- Location: Kanniya, Trincomalee, Sri Lanka
- Coordinates: 08°36′16.2″N 81°10′16.8″E

Archaeological Protected Monument of Sri Lanka
- Designated: 9 September 2011

The Kanniya Hot Springs (Sinhala: කන්නියා උණුදිය ලිං, Tamil: கன்னியா வெந்நீரூற்று) is a site with hot wells located in Trincomalee, Sri Lanka. There are seven wells in a square shape. Wells are only 0.91–1.22 m (3–4 ft) deep and you can clearly see the bottom. The temperature is considerably high but vary slightly from one spring to another. Wells run out of water, when 10-15 buckets of water are taken out.

== History ==
A stupa mound belonging to the early Anuradhapura period and an inscription of 1-2 centuries A.D. were found from the recent archaeological excavations done at the site. The inscription reveals that the waters of five tanks located in nearby area were reserved for the usage of Buddhist monks who were residing in a temple.

The old ruins of a monastery are still visible over the area, but it seems that most of those artifacts were destroyed during the Sri Lankan Civil War. On 9 September 2011, the seven hot water wells, Chaitya mound and other scattered building ruins in the site were formally recognised by the Government as archaeological protected monuments. The designation was declared under the government Gazette number 1723.

In the Ceylon Gazetteer of 1834, the remains of a temple sacred to Ganesha are documented at the site of the hot wells.

In a handbook for travellers published in 1955, the seven hot springs at Kanniya are described as being sacred to Buddhists, Hindus and Muslims alike. The ruins of a dagoba, a Vishnu temple and a mosque are said to stand together near the site. The book further describes the local tradition that the wells were created by Ravana.

== Legend ==
Religious Hindu rituals dedicated to lost loved ones are observed by the Sri Lankan Tamils at this site, believed in folklore to have been started by Ravana, antagonist of the epic Ramayana. According to local folklore, this site is connected with the antagonist Ravana of the Hindu epic, Ramayana. Ravana and his mother worshipped Hindu God Shiva at the Koneswaram temple and the Hot springs of Kanniya. Ravana wanted to remove the temple of Koneswaram when his mother was in ailing health. As Ravana was heaving the rock, Lord Shiva made him drop his sword. When Ravana's mother heard the news, she was wrought with unbeatable sorrow. When Ravana returned, he found his beloved mother's demise and was disheartened. To perform his mother's rites, Ravana stuck the earth with his sword in several spots and several fountains sprang from these points. The water was hot and such was the beginning of the hot water springs.

Mahabharata, the Hindu epic notes that hot well is near Gokarna bay, in the middle of the ocean and is the island shrine of Uma's consort Shiva, known in the three worlds and worshipped by all peoples from the subcontinent, including the native tribes Naga, Deva and the Yaksha, the rivers, ocean and mountains. It continues that the Koneshwara Temple and Hot water spring is the next pilgrimage spot for Hindus en route south following Kanyakumari of the early Pandyan kingdom and Tamiraparni island (Kudiramalai) and that worshippers should fast for three days at the temple.

According to the local beliefs, the history of Kanniya hot water spring is dated back to the Ravana era and the first written references to a hot water spring near to Gokarna bay (Trincomalee) is said to be found in the epic Ramayana.

== See also ==
- List of hot springs in the world
- Hinduism in Sri Lanka
- Buddhism in Sri Lanka
- Kinniya
