= Kokarneswarar Temple, Thirukokarnam =

Coordinates: 10.391512°N 78.800634°E

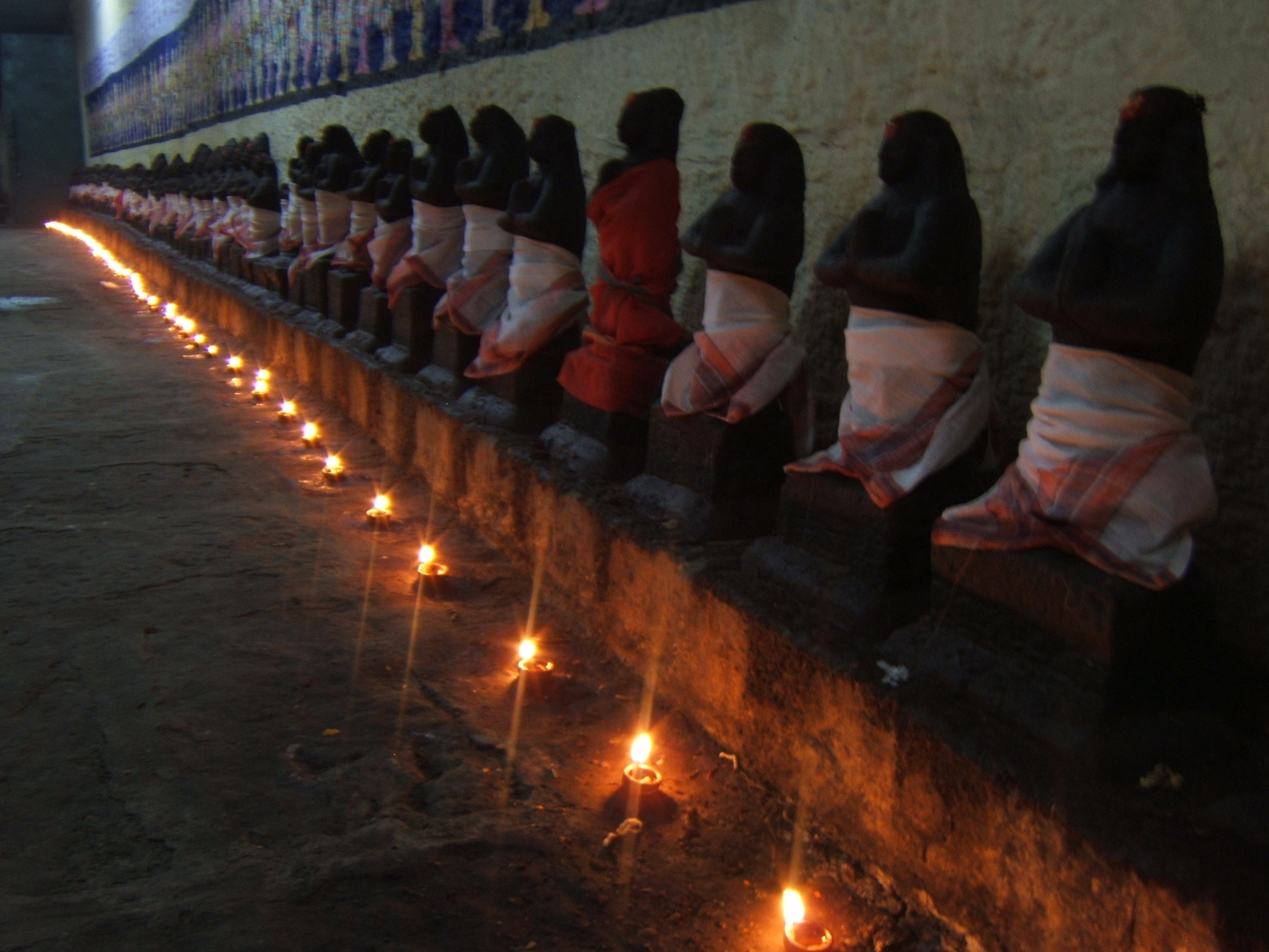
Kokarneswarar temple

The Kokarneswarar Temple is situated in town of Thirukokarnam located 5 kilometres from the town of Pudukkottai in the Tamil Nadu, India. The presiding deity is Kokarneswarar considered to be a form of the Hindu God Shiva. His consort Brihadambal is the family deity of the Thondaiman kings which ruled the princely Pudukkottai state. The Pallava-era rock-cut temple was constructed by the Pallava king Mahendravarman I sometime around the middle of the 7th century CE. Later additions were made in the early 2nd millennium by the Chola and Pandya dynasties.

Within the temple complex, there are shrines to Ganesa, Gangadhara and the Saptakannis. There is also an idol of the saint Sadasiva Brahmananda beneath a bikula tree, who is the Guru of the Thondaiman kings of Pudukkottai state.

The temple is still attended to by Hindu priests, making Kokarneswarar Temple possibly the second oldest Hindu temple with accurately datable early stonework that is still in active use today (the first being Mundeshwari Temple).
