= Origins of the Sri Lankan civil war =

The origins of the Sri Lankan civil war lie in the continuous political rancor between the majority Sinhalese and the minority Sri Lankan Tamils. The war has been described by social anthropologist Jonathan Spencer as an outcome of how modern ethnic identities have been made and re-made since the colonial period, with the political struggle between minority Tamils and the Sinhalese-dominant government accompanied by rhetorical wars over archeological sites and place name etymologies, and the political use of the national past.

== Colonial period ==
The roots of the conflict have been traced back to Sri Lanka's colonial era. Jaffna Tamils became overrepresented in civil service jobs partly due to a disproportionate amount of English medium schools in Jaffna. These English language schools were established in the Tamil-majority Jaffna by American missionaries since the British wanted to prevent conflict with the English missions in the south. The bulk of missionary schools were located in the Northern Province as well as the south western areas of the island. Since Jaffna soil was economically unproductive unlike the south, Tamils there invested more heavily in education to secure government jobs. A small section of the Jaffna society benefited from this while most of the Tamil areas remained uneducated. The British selected their candidates for the civil service on a merit basis through civil service examination without an ethnic quota. Therefore, historian E. F. C. Ludowyk explained the Tamil overrepresentation in civil service in terms of "their greater industry and thrift". S. W. R. D. Bandaranaike, the fourth Prime Minister of the Dominion of Ceylon, stated that the Tamils gained a "dominant position in the public services" due to their hard work and merit in passing the qualifying examinations. By 1946, 33% of clerical jobs in Ceylon were held by Sri Lankan Tamils, although they were 11% of the country's population.

However, there were few actual positions in contest and focusing on percentages obscures this fact. For example, in 1948, Tamils accounted for 46% of government accountants and 40% of irrigation engineers, which was equivalent to 20 more Tamil accountants and 10 more Tamil engineers than expected. The overall difference in number of government jobs was minuscule compared to a three-million strong-workforce that largely found employment elsewhere. Contemporary data shows that Sri Lankan Tamils were not over-privileged as a group, and had similar levels of average income and wealth to low-country Sinhalese, who both were in a better position than Kandyan Sinhalese and Indian Tamils. Sri Lankan Tamils were also considerably underrepresented in the thriving plantation economy, and had less access to good agricultural land and state power and patronage. Upon independence, the ruling Sinhalese elite would vilify Tamils as having been favoured by the British to justify discriminatory policies against them. Moreover, the British pushed for the dominance of Christianity and the removal of privileging Buddhism in the state government, the main religion followed by the Sinhalese. Sinhalese Buddhist nationalism sparked by the grievances of the majority against the domination of a Westernized elite would lead to ethnic polarization.

Ceylon Civil Service, 1870-1946
Year	Total	Sinhalese	Tamil	Burgher
1870	81	7	not recorded	not recorded
1907	95	4	2	6
1925	135	17	8	14
1946	160	69	31	-

Proportion of Tamil and Sinhalese speaking government employees 1946-2004
	Sinhalese	Tamil
1946 Civil Service	44.5%	20%
1946 Judicial Service	46.7%	28.9%
1980 Civil Service	85%	11%
2004 Civil Service	90%	8.5%

=== Missionary education and demand for equal representation ===
A primary contributor to the development of political awareness amongst Tamils during the European colonial rule was the advent of Protestant missionaries on a large scale from 1814. Missionary activities by missionaries of the American Board of Commissioners for Foreign Missions, Methodists, and Anglican churches, led to a revival amongst Hindu Tamils, who built their own schools, temples, societies and published literature to counter the missionary activities. The success of this effort led the Tamils to think confidently of themselves as a community and prepared the way for self-consciousness as a cultural, religious and linguistic community in the mid-19th century.

Great Britain, which had come to control the whole of the island in 1815, instituted a legislative council in 1833 with three Europeans and one each for Sinhalese, Sri Lankan Tamils and Burghers. This council's primary requirement was to play an advisory role to the Governor. These positions eventually came to be elected. From the introduction of the advisory council to the Donoughmore Commission in 1931 until the Soulbury Commission in 1947, the main dispute between the Sinhalese and Tamils elites was over the question of representation and not on the structure of the government. The issue of power sharing was used by the nationalists of both communities to create an escalating inter-ethnic rivalry which has continually gained momentum ever since.

There was initially little tension amongst Sri Lanka's two largest ethnic groups, the Sinhalese and the Tamils, when Ponnambalam Arunachalam, a Tamil, was appointed representative of the Sinhalese as well the Tamils in the national legislative council. However, the British Governor William Manning actively encouraged the concept of "communal representation" and created the Colombo seat which alternated between the Tamils and the Sinhalese.

Subsequently, the Donoughmore Commission strongly rejected communal representation, and brought in universal franchise. The decision was strongly opposed by the Tamil political leadership, who realized that they would be reduced to a minority in parliament, according to the proportion of the population they make up. G. G. Ponnambalam, a leader of the Tamil community, proposed to the Soulbury Commission that there should be 50–50 representation (50% for the Sinhalese, 50% for all other ethnic groups, including Tamils) in the proposed independent Ceylon – a proposal that was rejected. In 1936, a Pan-Sinhala Board of Ministers was created which excluded non-Sinhala members, and further divided the Sinhala and Tamil elites. The Second World War served as an interregnum where the adroit politics of D. S. Senanayake successfully balancing the polarising tendencies of the Sinhalese as well as Tamil nationalists.

== 1948 - Independence ==
Following independence in 1948, G. G. Ponnambalam and the party he founded, the All Ceylon Tamil Congress (Tamil Congress), joined D. S. Senanayake's moderate, Western-oriented, United National Party Government. This Government pass the Ceylon Citizenship Act of 1948, which denied citizenship to Sri Lankans of Indian origin and resulted in Sri Lanka becoming a majoritanian state. Sri Lanka's government represented only the majority community, the Sinhalese community, and had marginalized the minorities, causing a "severe degree of alienation" among the minority communities. When this Act was passed, the Tamil Congress was strongly criticized by the opposition Marxist groups and the newly formed Sri Lankan Tamil nationalist Federal Party (FP). S. J. V. Chelvanayakam, the leader of this new party, contested the citizenship act before the Supreme Court of Sri Lanka, and then in the Privy council in England, on grounds of discrimination towards minorities, but he did not prevail in overturning it. The FP took two seats in the 1952 election, against the Tamil Congress' four, but in the 1956 election, it became the dominant party in the Tamil districts and remained so for two decades. The FP's came to be known for its uncompromising stand on Tamil rights. In response to the parliamentary act that made Sinhala the sole official language in 1956, Federal MPs staged a non violent sit in (satyagraha) protest, but it was broken up by a nationalist mob. The police and other state authorities present at the location failed to take action to stop the violence. The FP was cast as scapegoats and were briefly banned after the 1958 riots, in which many were killed and thousands of Tamils forced to flee their homes.

== State sponsored colonisation schemes ==
Another point of conflict between the communities was state sponsored colonization schemes that changed the demographic balance in the Eastern province in favor of majority Sinhalese that the Tamil nationalists considered to be their traditional homeland. It has been perhaps the most immediate cause of inter-communal violence.

== Denial of citizenship to Indian Tamils ==
There is a sizable population of Tamils in the Central Province, plantation laborers brought down from India by the British colonial authorities in the 19th and 20th centuries. These Indian Tamils (or Estate Tamils), as they are called, still work mainly in Sri Lanka's tea plantations. They have been locked in poverty for generations and continue to experience poor living conditions. Although they speak dialects of the same language, they are usually considered a separate community from the Sri Lankan Tamils of the North and East.

The government of D.S. Senanayake passed legislation stripping the estate Tamils of their citizenship in 1949, leaving them stateless.

The effect was to tilt the island's political balance away from the Tamils. In 1948, at independence, the Tamils had 33% of the voting power in Parliament.. Upon the disenfranchisement of the estate Tamils, however, this proportion dropped to 20%. The Sinhalese could and did obtain more than a 2/3 majority in Parliament, making it impossible for Tamils to exercise an effective opposition to Sinhalese policies affecting them. The main reason for the imbalance was that several multi-member constituencies elected a Tamil member of Parliament in a majority Sinhalese electorate. The idea in having multi-member constituencies was to prevent domination of minorities by a future nationalist government.

Not content with stripping their citizenship, successive governments tried to remove the estate Tamils from the country entirely. In 1964, Prime Minister Sirimavo Bandaranaike signed an agreement with Indian Prime Minister L.B. Shastri. A second agreement was signed three years later with Indira Gandhi. These provided that 600,000 of the estate Tamils would be expelled and sent to India over a 15-year period, and 375,000 would be restored their Sri Lankan citizenship. Not all of the former group actually returned to India, and remained in Sri Lanka without the ability to vote, travel abroad, or participate fully in Sri Lankan life. It was not until 2003 that full citizenship rights were restored to the remaining Tamils in the hill country.

== Language policy ==
The detailed reports of the Kandyan Peasantry commission (1947), the Buddhist commission (1956), as well as statistics of preponderant admissions of Tamil speaking students to the university provided a basis for these Sinhalese activists who ensured S.W.R.D. Bandaranaike won a landslide victory in 1956, campaigning on a strong Sinhalese nationalist platform.

Ethnic conflict was aggravated by the Sinhala Official Language Act of 1956. General consensus existed that English should be replaced as the country's official language. In the Act, the Sri Lankan government replaced English with Sinhala which deprived the Tamils of their right to deal with government institutions in their language as well as limited their opportunity to join government service. By 1956, approximately 75% of the population maintained fluency in the Sinhala language, approximately 15% were proficient in Tamil and the remaining ethnic groups spoke mainly English including the Burghers and Muslims. Multi-linguism was not common-spread, although many Sri Lankans had knowledge of at least two of the three main languages.

The Sri Lanka Freedom Party (SLFP) government led by Solomon Bandaranaike was sworn into office on a platform that of helping the growing population of unemployed youth who were disenfranchised by the Sinhala Official Language policy. A majority of civil servants under colonial rule were Tamil whose positions benefited from free English-medium missionary schools in the north and east of the island. The Tamil Federal Party led a group of Tamil volunteers and staged a sit-down satyagraha (peaceful protest).

The Sinhala Official Language policy was gradually weakened by all subsequent governments and in 1987, Tamil was made an official language of Sri Lanka, alongside Sinhala. English has remained the de facto language of governance; government activity continues to be carried out in English, including the drafting of legislation.

== 1958 riots ==
In the 1958 riots, 150–200 people were killed, primarily Tamils and thousands more were assaulted and Tamil property looted. Over 25,000 Tamil refugees were relocated to the North. Similarly, a large number of Sinhalese were killed or expelled from the North and East of country and were relocated in the South.

== 1970 – Banning of Tamil media and literature importation ==
Importing Tamil-language films, books, magazines, journals, etc. from the cultural hub of Tamil Nadu, India was banned in 1970. This was perceived by some minority Sri Lankan Tamil politicians as directed against their cultural survival. Sri Lanka also banned groups such as the Dravida Munnetra Kazhagam and the Tamil Youth League. Culturally, Tamil Sri Lankans were cut off from Tamil Nadu. But some argue that it led to native Sri Lankan Tamil literature and media to thrive without competition from India.

Foreign exchange for the long established practice of Tamil students going to India for university education was stopped. Equally, examinations for external degrees from the University of London were abolished. The government insisted this was a part of a general program of economic self-sufficiency, part of its socialist agenda, however most of the Tamil population did not accept nor believe this.

== 1971 – Universities Act ==
The policy of standardization was a policy implemented by the Sri Lankan government in 1971 to curtail the number of Tamil students selected for certain faculties in the universities.

Under the British, English was the state language and consequently greatly benefited English speakers. However, the majority of the Sri Lankan populace lived outside urban areas and did not belong to the social elite, and therefore did not enjoy the benefits of English-medium education. The issue was compounded further by the fact that in the Jaffna district, where a largely Tamil speaking populace resided, students had access to English-medium education through missionary schools. This created a situation where a large proportion of university students enrolled in professional courses such as medicine and engineering were English speaking Tamils.

== Rise of separatism ==
At first, Tamil politicians pushed for a federal system through the Federal Party. This was met with suspicion and resistance from many Sinhalese. In the 1960s, the government of Sirimavo Bandaranaike proceeded to nationalize most missionary schools in the country, secularizing them and changing the language of instruction from English to Sinhala only. After this, it became rare for Sinhalese and Tamil children to attend school together. Unable to speak Sinhalese, it became increasingly difficult for Tamil youth to gain access to civil service jobs or attend universities, and unemployment rose.

The name of the country was changed from Ceylon to Sri Lanka in 1970, a name of Sanskrit origin that angered and alienated many Tamils.

In 1973, the Federal Party decided to demand for a separate state. To further their nationalistic cause they merged with the other Tamil political parties to become the Tamil United Liberation Front (TULF) in 1975. On 1976, after the first National convention of the Tamil United Liberation Front, the Ceylon Tamils moved towards a morphed nationalism which meant that they were now unwilling to live within a confined single island entity. Chelvanayakam and the Federal Party had always campaigned for a united country and thought that partitioning of the country would be “suicidal” up until 1973. However policies by the various governments that was considered to be discriminatory by Tamil leadership modified the stand to Tamil independence.

=== Vaddukoddai Resolution ===
The concept of a separate nation, Tamil Eelam, was proposed by the Tamil United Liberation Front (TULF) in the Vaddukoddai Resolution in 1976. TULF was a coalition of parties who went on to campaign in the 1977 elections for an independent state for Tamils in Sri Lanka. They won most of the Tamil seats, but the government later banned them from Parliament for advocating an independent state. Tamil Separatists led by LTTE took over leadership of the Tamils during the Sri Lankan Civil War.

== Rise of militancy ==
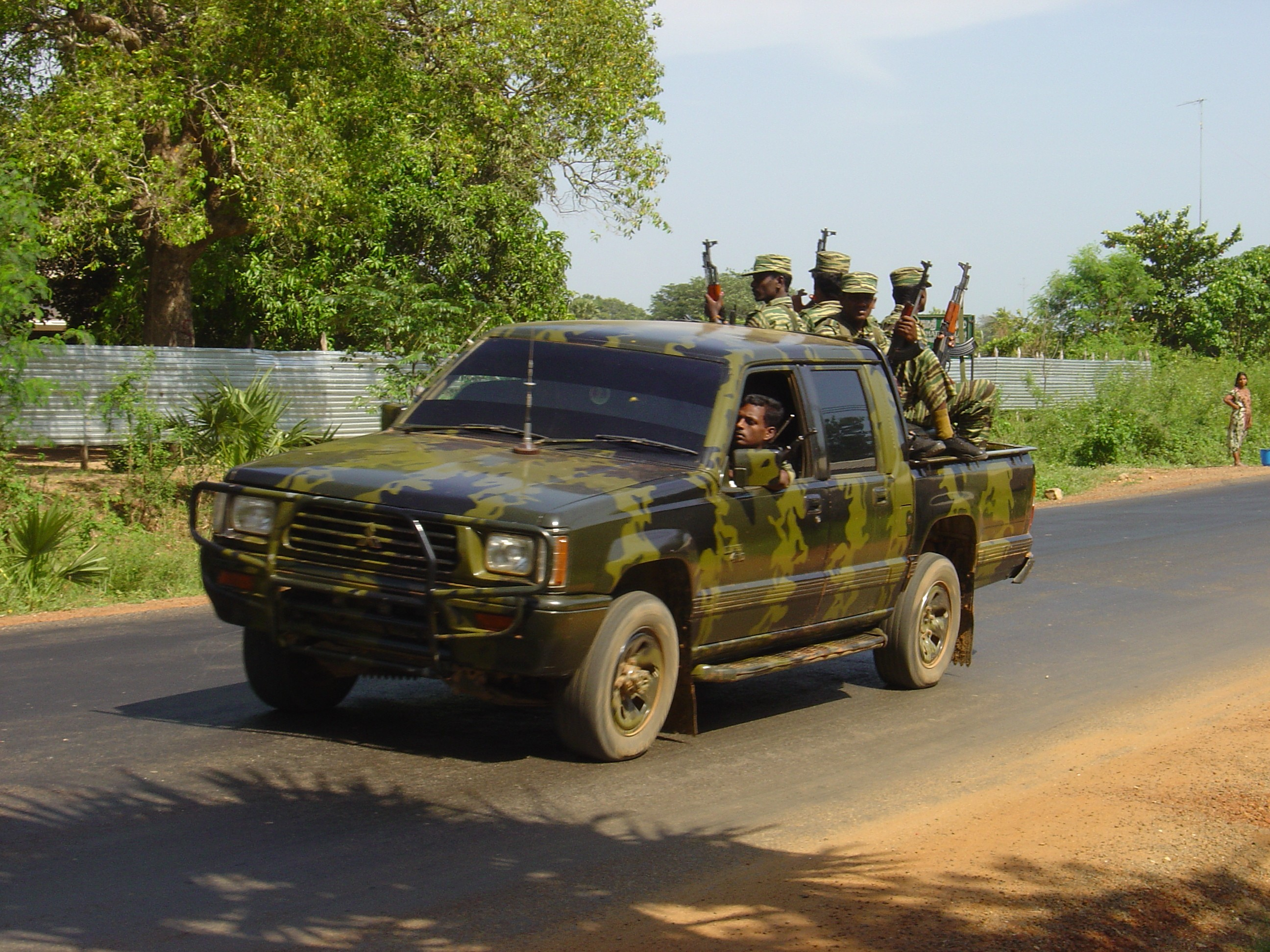
Tamil rebels in a truck in Killinochchi in 2004

Since 1948, when Sri Lanka became independent, successive governments have adopted policies that had the effect of net preference to the majority Sinhalese at the expense of the minority Sri Lankan Tamils. The governments adopted these policies in order to assist the Sinhalese community in such areas as education and public employment. But these policies severely curtailed the middle class Tamil youth, who found it more difficult during the 1970s and 1980s to enter a university or secure employment. These individuals belonging to this younger generation, often referred to by other Tamils as "the boys" formed many militant organizations. The most important contributor to the strength of the militant groups was the Black July pogrom which was perceived have been an organized event in which over 1000 Sri Lankan Tamil civilians were killed prompting many youth to prefer the armed path of resistance.

By the end of 1987, they had fought not only the Sri Lankan security forces but also the Indian Peace Keeping Force. They also fought among each other, as well, with equal if not greater brutality. The main group: Liberation Tigers of Tamil Eelam (LTTE), a rebel group, decimated most of the others. They represented intergenerational tensions as well as caste and ideological differences. Except the LTTE, many of the remaining organizations have morphed into minor political parties within the Tamil National Alliance or as standalone political parties. Some also function as paramilitary groups within the Sri Lankan military.

=== Burning of the Jaffna Public Library ===
A Sinhalese mob went on a rampage on the nights of May 31 to June 2, burning the market area of Jaffna, the office of the Tamil Newspaper, the home of the member of Parliament for Jaffna, the Jaffna Public Library and killing four people. The destruction of the Jaffna Public Library was the incident which appeared to cause the most distress to the people of Jaffna. The 95,000 volumes of the Public Library destroyed by the fire included numerous culturally important and irreplaceable manuscripts. Witnesses reported the presence of uniformed police officers in the mob and their involvement in the deaths of four individuals.

=== Outbreak of war ===
Black July (Tamil: கறுப்பு யூலை, romanized: Kaṟuppu Yūlai; Sinhala: කළු ජූලිය, romanized: Kalu Juliya) was an anti-Tamil pogrom that occurred in Sri Lanka during July 1983. The pogrom was premeditated, and was finally triggered by a deadly ambush on a Sri Lankan Army patrol by the Liberation Tigers of Tamil Eelam (LTTE) on 23 July 1983, which killed 13 soldiers. (Note: George Immerwahr, a United Nations civil servant and U.S. citizen, recounted the following regarding the riots: "the most shattering report came from a [Sinhalese] friend who was a civil servant; he told me that he had himself helped plan the riots at the orders of his superiors. When I heard him say this, I was so shocked I told him I simply couldn't believe him, but he insisted he was telling the truth, and in fact he justified the government's decision to stage the riots. When I heard this, I telephoned an official in our own State Department, and while he declined to discuss the matter, I got the impression that he already knew from our Embassy in Colombo what I was telling him.") Although initially orchestrated by members of the ruling UNP, the pogrom soon escalated into mass violence with significant public participation.

On the night of 24 July 1983, anti-Tamil rioting started in the capital city of Colombo and then spread to other parts of the country. Over seven days, mainly Sinhalese mobs attacked, burned, looted, and killed Tamil civilians. The looting, arson and killings later spread to include all Indians, with the Indian High Commission being attacked and the Indian Overseas Bank being completely destroyed. Estimates of the death toll range between 400 and 3,000, and 150,000 people became homeless. According to Tamil Centre for Human Rights (TCHR), the total number of Tamils killed in the Black July pogrom was 5,638.

Around 18,000 homes and 5,000 shops were destroyed. The economic cost of the riots was estimated to be $300 million. The pogrom was organised to destroy the economic base of the Tamils, with every Tamil owned shop and establishment being plundered and set alight. The NGO International Commission of Jurists described the violence of the pogrom as having "amounted to acts of genocide" in a report published in December 1983.

The pogrom led to the dramatic growth of Tamil militant groups which went from having 20-30 members each to thousands of youths joining their ranks. Prior to this very few Tamils were willing to join the armed struggle. Black July is generally seen as the start of the Sri Lankan civil war between the Tamil militants and the government of Sri Lanka. Sri Lankan Tamils fled to other countries in the ensuing years, with July becoming a period of remembrance for the diaspora around the world. To date no one has been held accountable for any of the crimes committed during the pogrom.

=== Involvement of India ===
Under Prime Minister Indira Gandhi, India's Research And Analysis Wing (RAW) covertly supported Tamil separatist movements in Sri Lanka, by providing military training, supplies, and sanctuary to the Tamil groups with the aim to counterbalance Sri Lanka's increasing ties with the West and China. In 1985, India mediated peace talks in Thimpu. In 1987, India took a more direct role in Sri Lanka with the signing of the Indo-Sri Lanka Peace Accord. As part of this agreement, the Indian Peacekeeping Force (IPKF) was deployed in Sri Lanka to oversee the implementation of the accord, but this intervention turned contentious when the LTTE rejected the agreement, leading to violent clashes between Indian forces and the LTTE. The situation worsened following the assassination of the former Indian Prime Minister Rajiv Gandhi in 1991, by the LTTE in retaliation for India's military involvement, after which India banned the group and adopted a more hard-line stance against Tamil separatism. The LTTE categorically denied any involvement in this assassination.

== Bibliography ==
- Aspinall, Edward; Jeffrey, Robin; Regan, Anthony, eds. (2013). Diminishing Conflict in Asia and the Pacific. Routledge. ISBN 978-1136251139.
