= List of Archaeological Protected Monuments in Trincomalee District =

This is a list of Archaeological Protected Monuments in Trincomalee District, Sri Lanka.

| Monument | Image | Location | Grama Niladhari Division | Divisional Secretary's Division | Registered | Description | Refs |
|---|---|---|---|---|---|---|---|
| Arisimale Raja Maha Vihara | | Pulmude | Pulmude | Kuchchaveli | 9 September 2011 | Archaeological ruins in the Arismale range of mountain near the Pulmude Beach | |
| Fort Fredrick | | Trincomalee | | Trincomalee | | | |
| Kanniya Hot water spring | | Kanniya | No. 243/P, Kanniya | Trincomalee | 9 September 2011 | Seven hot water well are located in the visinity of chaithya mound and other building ruins | |
| Lankapatuna Samudragiri Vihara | | Seenathvali | Uppural | Seruvila | 7 March 2008 | Ancient Dagaba, Ancient ruined pond, oval shaped and rectangular shaped pickaxe marks and Panabami | |
| Olugama image house | | Olugama | No. 31-K | Padavi Sri Pura | 23 February 2007 | Image house situated in the middle of Olugama paddy fields | |
| Pasanapabbatha Vihara | | Kalladi | Aneitivu | Verugal | 7 March 2008 | Ruined Dagaba, six rock inscriptions, ancient stones steps and Panabami | |
| Rangiri Ulpotha Vihara | | | | Gomarankadawala | | | |
| Ranmadu Raja Maha Vihara | | Parana Medawachchiya | No. 31/F, Parana Madawachchiya | Padavi Sri Pura | 9 September 2011 | The Building rains complex with image house | |
| Ridee Kanda Monastery | | | | | | Ancient monastery complex | |
| Seevalipura Raja Maha Vihara | | Seevalipura | Jayanthiya (GND No. 31/1) | Padavi Sri Pura | 17 May 2013 | The ruins of buildings in the territory of the Vihara | |
| Seruvila Mangala Raja Maha Viharaya | | Seruwila | Seruwila | Verugal | | Seruwawila Mangala Raja Maha Vihara is an ancient Buddhist temple in Trincomalee district in Eastern Province, which is among the sixteen or seventeen holiest Buddhist shrines (Solosmasthana) in Sri Lanka. It was built during the reign of King Kavan Tissa, Prince of Ruhuna, (2nd century BC) containing the Lalata Dathun Wahanse (sacred forehead bone) of Buddha. | |
| Thiriyaya Girihanduseya | | Thiriyaya | East Kaddukulam Pattu | Trincomalee | | | |
| Trincomalee ancient four Bodhi trees | | | Trincomalee | Trincomalee | 13 March 2009 | The four ancient boa trees and the land situated within the limits of Dockyard road to the North, Vanniyar Lane (Vannigar Road) to the East, Nelson theatre to the South. Green Road to the West | |
| Trincomalee old museum building | | | Trincomalee town | Trincomalee | 18 August 2006 | | |
| Velgam Vehera | | Mahwewa (Periyakulam) | East Kaddukulam Pattu | | | | |
| sampur lighthouse | | | | | | | |
