= K. S. Kugathasan =

Sri Lankan politician (born 1953)

K. S. Kugathasan MP
- க. ச. குகதாசன்

Member of the Parliament of Sri Lanka
- Incumbent
- Assumed office 9 July 2024
- Preceded by: R. Sampanthan
- Constituency: Trincomalee District

Personal details
- Born: Kathiravelu Shanmugam Kugathasan; 16 October 1953 (age 72)
- Party: Illankai Tamil Arasu Kachchi
- Other political affiliations: Tamil National Alliance
- Education: Madurai Kamaraj University

Kathiravelu Shanmugam Kugathasan (Tamil: கதிரவேலு சண்முகம் குகதாசன்; born 16 October 1953) is a Sri Lankan Tamil social activist, politician and Member of Parliament. A member of the Tamil National Alliance, he has represented Trincomalee District since July 2024.

== Early life and family ==
Kugathasan was born on 16 October 1953. He is the son of Shanmugam and Thanabagyam and is from the coastal village of Thiriyai in north-eastern Sri Lanka. He has a Bachelor of Arts degree in planning and administration from the University of Colombo and a Master of Arts degree in political sciences from Madurai Kamaraj University.

Kugathasan is married to Padma and has two children.

== Career ==
Kugathasan was president of the Trincomalee District branch of the Gandhiyam Movement which was founded by S. A. David and S. Rajasundaram. Following the 1977 anti-Tamil pogrom, he assisted in the resettlement of Up-Country Tamil refugees in the Kuchchaveli, Muthalikkulam and Mutur areas of Trincomalee District. He was responsible for more than 50 Gandhiyam pre-schools. The Sri Lankan government, which accused the Gandhiyam Movement of helping the Sri Lankan Tamil militants, banned the organisation in 1983 and arrested many of its leaders including David and Rajasundaram. Kugathasan was arrested as well but was released as there was no evidence against him. He was however placed under police surveillance. He moved to Tamil Nadu following the Black July riots of 1983.

Kugathasan and S. C. Chandrahasan, son of S. J. V. Chelvanayakam, founded the Organization for Eelam Refugees Rehabilitation (OfERR) in 1984 to provide assistance, rehabilitation and education to the thousands of Sri Lankan Tamil refugees in India. it was through his work with OfERR that Kugathasan met his future wife Padma. He and Maravan Bulavu Sachidananda, the owner of the Kanthalakam bookstore in Madras, produced an English language magazine in order to publicise the struggles of the Sri Lankan Tamil people to the whole of India. This resulted in him being placed under surveillance by the Indian intelligence services. Following the Assassination of Rajiv Gandhi in May 1991 there was widespread violence against Sri Lankan Tamils in India and Kugathasan's newspaper was banned. He moved to Canada after the Indian authorities told him to leave India.

Kugathasan was co-ordinator for the Canada's Immigrant Settlement and Adaptation Program and the International Languages Program for a school board in Ontario. He wrote several text books and training books to encourage the teaching of Tamil in Canada. He was president and secretary of the Trincomalee Welfare Association in Canada for 20 years. He taught Tamil language BA and MA degree courses in Canada for a university from Tirunelveli.

Kugathasan returned to Sri Lanka permanently in early 2018. He served as Co-ordinator for Eastern Province Development Affairs for the Ministry of National Policies, Economic Affairs and Resettlement. He has been president of the Trincomalee District Welfare Association since 2018.

Kugathasan has been a member of Illankai Tamil Arasu Kachchi since 1975 and leader of its Trincomalee branch since 2018. He contested the 2020 parliamentary election as one of the Tamil National Alliance (TNA) electoral alliance's candidates in Trincomalee District but the alliance only won a single seat in the district. He was elected general-secretary of ITAK in January 2024. He was appointed to the Parliament of Sri Lanka in July 2024 following the death of TNA leader R. Sampanthan.

== Electoral history ==
Electoral history of K. S. Kugathasan
Election	Constituency	Party	Alliance	Votes	Result
2020 parliamentary	Trincomalee District	Illankai Tamil Arasu Kachchi	Tamil National Alliance	16,770	Not elected
