= Kantalai Divisional Secretariat =

Kantalai කන්තලේ கந்தளாய்
- Divisional Secretariat
- Country: Sri Lanka
- Province: Eastern Province
- District: Trincomalee District

Population (2007)
  - Total: 42,861
- Time zone: UTC+5:30 (Sri Lanka Standard Time)

Kantalai is a Divisional Secretariat of Trincomalee District, in the Eastern Province of Sri Lanka. To the north it is bounded by Kinniya and Thambalagamuwa divisional secretariats, and to the east by Seruvila divisional secretariat. In the south it shares a boundary with Polonnaruwa District, while in the west it is bounded by Anuradhapura District, both of which are in the North Central Province.

In 2007 the division had a population of 42,861, of which 78.5 per cent were Sinhalese, 17.7 per cent Moors and 3.7 per cent Tamils. The population included 302 displaced persons, 95.0 per cent of whom had been forced to move by ethnic conflict, and 5.0 per cent by the 2004 Indian Ocean tsunami. The division is subdivided into 23 grama niladhari divisions.

== Demography-Religion ==
Religion in Kantale DS Division (2012)
1. Buddhist (79.6%)
2. Hindu (3.20%)
3. Muslim (16.3%)
4. Roman Catholic (0.50%)
5. Other Christian (0.40%)
6. Other (0.00%)

Name	Population
Agbopura	2,954
Bathiyagama	5,245
Batuchchiya	1,738
Ganthalawa Unit 11	826
Ganthalawa Unit 12	977
Jayanthipura	2,477
Kanthale Town	2,948
Kanthalai Town South	2,190
Pansalgodella	1,285
Peraru East	2,419
Peraru Unit 02	1,477
Peraru West	3,193
Rajaela Unit 03	922
Rajaela Unit 04	1,412
Rajaela Unit 05	1,026
Rajawewa	2,529
Senipura	568
Sureyapura	969
Wanela East	1,604
Wanela West	1,166
Wenrasnpura Unit 14	1,879
Wenrasapura Unit 15	1,417
Wenrasapura Unit 16	1,640

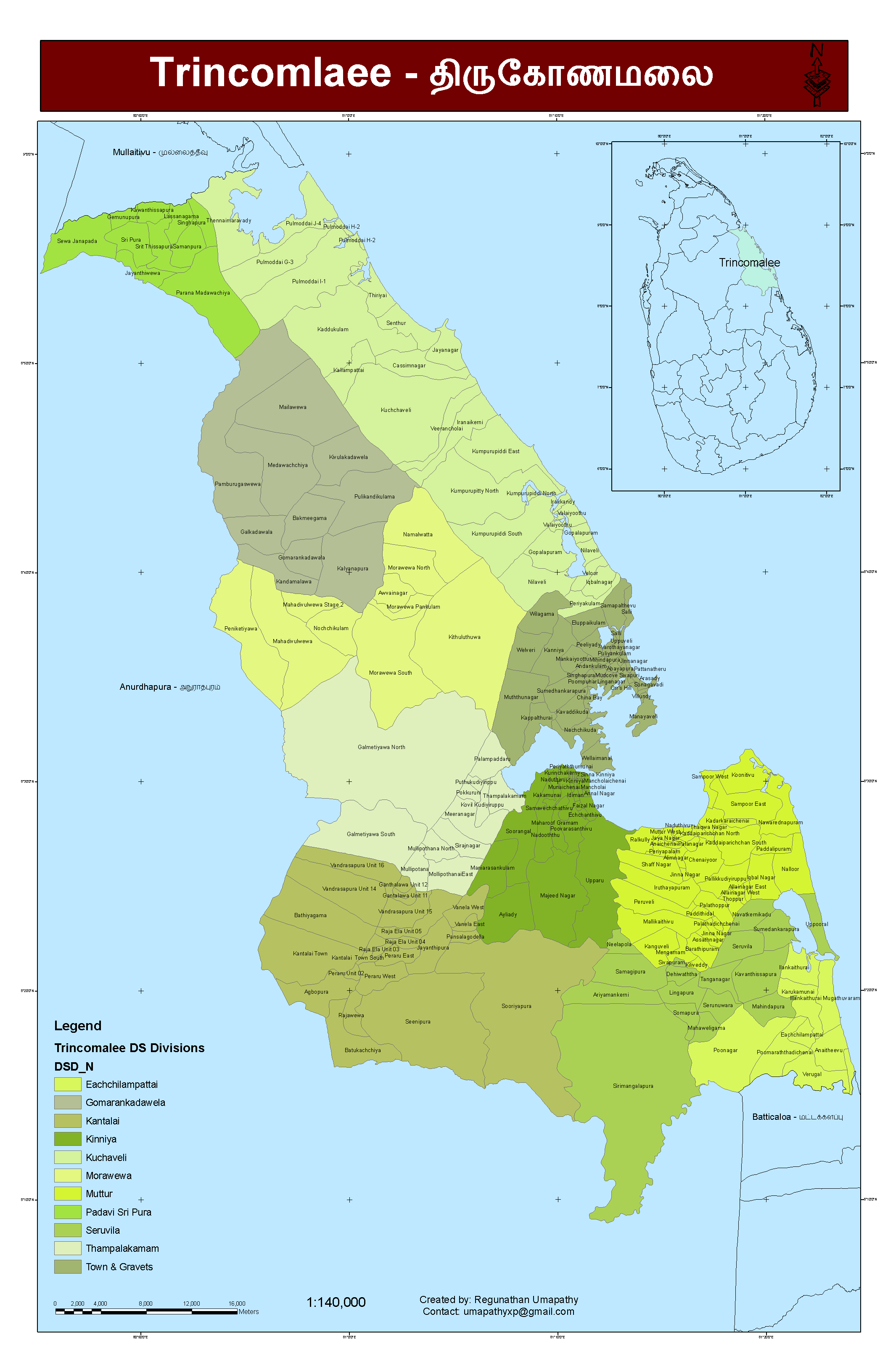
Map showing the position of Kantalai Divisional Secretariat within Trincomalee District, and the subdivision into grama niladhari divisions.
