= Arulanandam =

Arulanandam (Tamil: அருளானந்தம்) is a surname found in India, and occasionally a middle name. Notable people with this surname include:

- Sakthi Arulanandam (born 1962), the pen name of an Indian poet
- Srikanthalakshmi Arulanandam (1961 – 2019), a Sri Lankan librarian and writer
- Xavier Jayakumar Arulanandam (born 1953), a Malaysian politician and dentist
- Solomon Arulanandam David (1924 – 2015), a Sri Lankan architect and activist
