= Ati Konanayakar =

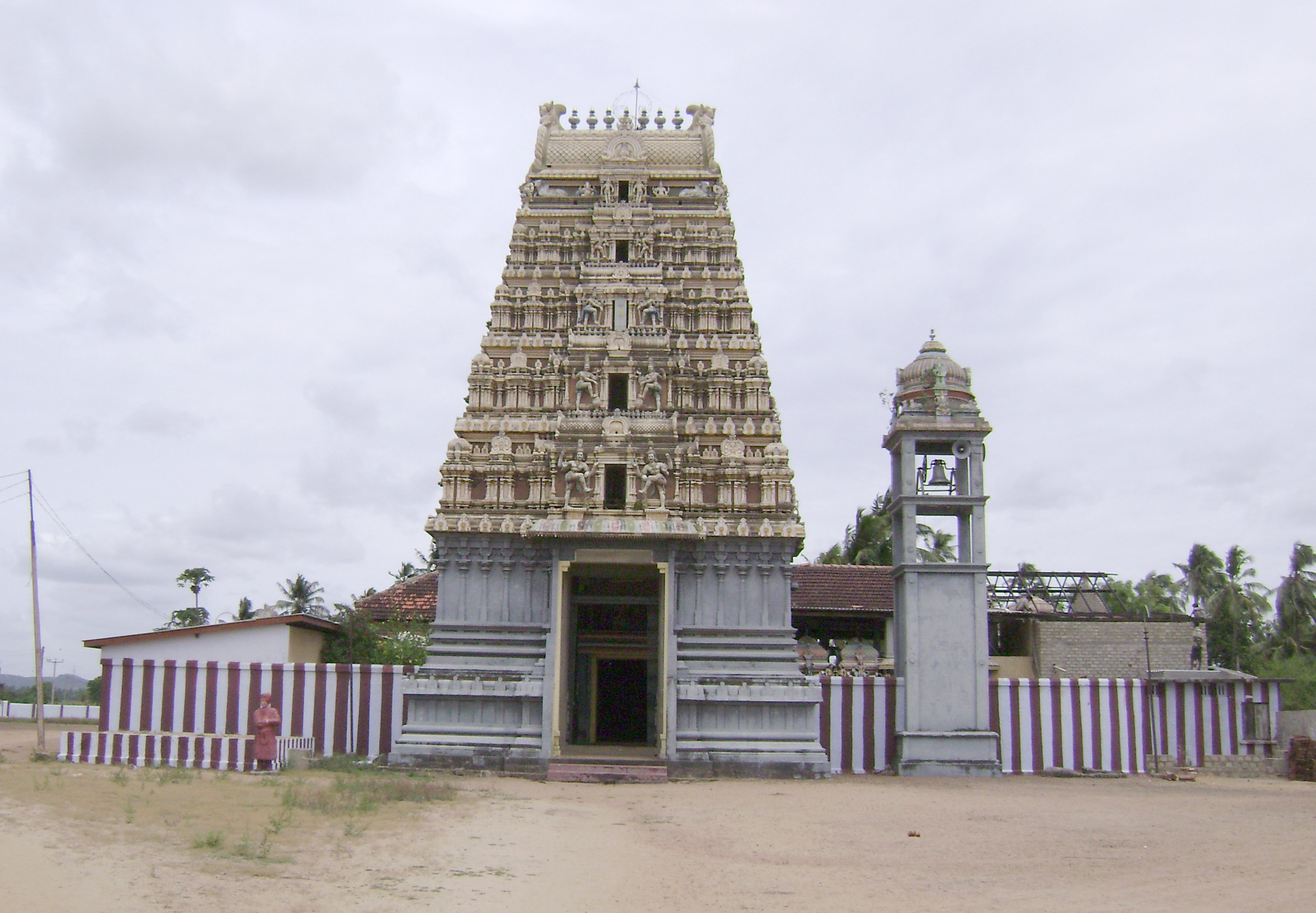
- Front gate or Gopuram with the bell tower, wall enclosing the inner courtyard.

Religion
- Affiliation: Hinduism
- District: Trincomalee
- Province: Eastern
- Deity: Siva

Location
- Location: Tampalakamam
- Country: Sri Lanka

Architecture
- Type: Dravidian architecture
- Completed: 1630-1689

Ati Konanayakar or Aathi Koneswaram (Tamil ஆதிகோணநாயகர் கோயில் அல்லது ஆதிகோணேஸ்வரம்) is a regionally important Hindu temple in Tampalakamam village in the Trincomalee District of Sri Lanka. The name of the temple in Tamil means the "temple of the original lord of Koneswaram". It is situated 24 kilometers (15 mi) from the port town of Trincomalee. The temple was constructed during the 17th century as a successor to the Koneswaram temple (Temple of Thousand Pillars) that was destroyed by Portuguese colonials in 1622.

Of the original temple, only the main sanctum sanctorum remains, all other buildings are of newer construction. The Gopuram or main entrance tower was added in 1953 and it is one of the tallest in the region. The temple is built of stone and is surrounded by two enclosed path ways. The presiding deity is Siva but there are important cults associated with the veneration of Pattini Amman and Kathirkamaswami accommodated within the main premises as well. The temple also has minor shrines to Pillaiyar, Navagraha, Murukan, Valli and Tevayani.

The temple celebrates daily services stipulated according to Agamic scriptures along with an elaborate annual festival that involves Tamil Hindus living in the general area of Trincomalee district. There are also festivals that pertain to Pattini Amman and Kathirkamaswami. As part of the Sri Lankan civil war, in the 1980s and 90's the village was depopulated and the temple abandoned. Since 2004 residents of the village have returned and the temple has been restored.

== History ==
Ati Konanayakar temple is situated in the village of Tampalakamam that was part of the medieval semi-independent feudal division called Tampalakamam Pattu. Prior to the arrival of Portuguese in 1622 and then Dutch colonial overloads in 1656, leaders of the Tampalakamam Pattu and others around it were independent rulers sometimes subject to Jaffna kingdom or Kandyan kingdom. Tampalakamam is surrounded by lush paddy fields and was a prosperous settlement. The presiding deity is known as Ati Konanayakar and the consort as Hamsagamanambikai, another name for Mother goddess Amman). These names are reminiscent of the original presiding deity of the Koneswaram temple, Konesar and Annam Mennatai. The idol of the presiding deity is dated to the later Chola period (1070-1279 CE) and the consort to that of early Chola period based on the composition of metals and styles. (See picture here and here.) The temple's name and the separate shrine to Ati Konanaykar allude to the tradition that this temple was built to accommodate the idols that were saved from the destruction of the Temple of Thousand Pillars in Tricomalee by the Portuguese colonial officers.

According to Tirukonasala Puranam a Tamil chronicle written during the period of Kandyan kingdom's ascendance in the general area of Tampalakamam Pattu, the temple was built with the help of Kandyan King Rajasingha II (1630–1689) after the loss of Koneswaram temple in the Tricomalee town. The idols that were saved from the destroyed temple were moved from place to place and eventually located in a secure territory under the Kandyan jurisdiction. According to the chronicle Vara rasasinkam identified with Rajasinghe II by historians such as S. Pathmanathan, also provided for the upkeep of the temple by allocating land to the temple in perpetuity and revenue distribution from local taxes. Another Tamil text of interest is Konesar Kalvettu. It is written from a point of view legitimizing the claims of the new temple, that is Ati Konnanayakar, to the traditions, revenue and services rendered to the destroyed Koneswaram temple. Authorship of the text is attributed to one Kavirasa Varotayan and it was written after the new temple was established.

According to the Tirukonasal Puranam, Rajasingha II directed the local feudal lords to maintain the temple and its administration. These traditions were maintained by the local Vanniar chiefs of the Tampalakamam Pattu division during the ensuing period. The prevalence of this tradition as a successor temple to the original temple destroyed by the Portuguese was recorded by the Dutch colonial governor of Trincomalee, Van Senden in 1786. He recorded the physical status of the idols that were from the original Koneswaram temple. Residents of Tampalakamam Patuu made requests to the Dutch colonials to follow the traditions of allocating a portion of the revenue generated from paddy cultivation of rice to the maintenance of the temple. A similar request was also made to the British colonial governor Alexander Johnston by the Vanniyar lords of the Tampalakamam Pattu, after the British had captured the island in 1815.

As a substitute temple to the original Koneswaram temple that was destroyed, tradition has endowed Ati Konanayakar with all privileges that was enjoyed by the previous temple. This includes the association of Hindus from various parts of Trincomalee district its festival organization to the assimilation of all local non-Saiva cults within the temple premises. During the Kandyan and later Dutch colonial period the Tamapalakamam temple also enjoyed revenue from the land that was given to it via royal endowments. During the British colonial period the temple came under the control of private ownership. The temple's private trustees were removed and in 1945 it became the responsibility of locally elected board. The Gopuram or gate tower was added in 1953. It is one of the largest towers in the region and is of five stories high.

== Temple layout ==
The temple has as its main components, Garbhagriha or sanctum sanctorum, most probably the only original building left over from the days when the temple was established. There are number of halls called as mantapam, such as arta mantapam, maka mantapam, snapana mantapam and stampa mantapam where the flag of the temple is erected. The entrance tower or iracakopuram is of recent addition and was added in 1953. the smaller structures have been renovated or reconstructed from time to time since the inception of the temple in the 17th century. The temple, which is of stone construction is surrounded by a circumambulatory enclosed by a brick wall beyond which there is an outer street.

== Rituals and festivals ==
The rituals and daily worship at the temple is conducted according to Hindu religious scripts called Makutakamam. Worship is conducted three times daily and on special occasions such as Thaipongal, Thaipusam and Tamil New Year day. The annual festival has peculiar features unique to this temple. The tradition allocates various functions to be performed by members of the public from the surrounding country side. The Pulavanar or bard who sings songs comes from the village of Sampur. The craftsman who has to paint the temple flag that is hoisted during the festival comes from Killiveddy. The chief priest known as Kappukattiyar comes from the Kattukulampattu area in Muttur.

The temple also assimilates the cult of Pattini, a local mother goddess who is also popular amongst the majority Sinhalese population of the rest of the island nation as well. The idol of Pattini is kept at Tampalakamam temple and taken to its place of veneration in Palampottaru and devotees from Trincomalee town also come in procession to the place of worship at the same time. After the ceremonies the idol is returned to the Ati Konanaykar temple premises.

Another important festival is the one associated with Kathirkamaswami. He is the lord of the temple located in Kataragama and is venerated by both Sinhalese and Tamils of Sri Lanka as a form of Murugan. His festival is a combination of prescribed Hindu ritual Agamic texts and as well as non-Agamic rituals. During this festival a casket is placed in a sacred couch and taken around the outer courtyard in a procession. Many devotees participate in this festival and perform kavadi.

Another unique festival associated with the temple is called Tirukulattu velvi which is sacrificial offering made to a man made irrigation reservoir known as a water tank. According to tradition, this festival was organized during legendary king Kullakottan in the original Koneswaram temple and was directed at the Kantalai Tank. During the festival local agriculturalists would congregate at the Kantalai Tank and offer boiled rice along with areca nut and betel leaves to the idols.

== Abandonment and restoration ==
As part of the Sri Lankan civil war, the Tampalakamam village was severely affected leading to the abandonment of the village and the temple. During the 1990s the village was depopulated and the population was residing in refugee camps. The temple was used as a refugee camp as well. During the ensuing period demographic change had taken place in the surrounding area. According to Tamilnet, by 2003 the village and the region was resettled with returning refugees.

== Bibliography ==
- Pathmanathan, Sivasubramaniam (2006). Hindu Temples of Sri Lanka. Kumaran Book House. ISBN 955-9429-91-4.
- Ramachandran, Nirmala (2004). Hindu legacy in Sri Lanka. Stamford Lake.
- University Teachers for Human Rights (1993). A Sovereign will to self-destruct : the continuing sage of dislocation & disintegration. University Teachers for Human Rights.
- Obeyesekera, Gananath (1984). The Cult of the Goddess Pattini. University of Chicago Press. ISBN 0-226-61602-9.
