= Manayaveli =

Manayaveli மனையாவளி මණයවෙලිය
- Village
- Location within Sri Lanka
- Coordinates: 8°33′47″N 81°14′18″E
- Country: Sri Lanka
- Province: Eastern
- District: Trincomalee
- DS Division: Town & Gravets

Manayaveli (Tamil: மனையாவளி) is a village administrative division in Trincomalee Town and Gravets in Trincomalee, Sri Lanka. As of 2005 Manyaveli consists of 1,176 families with 5,689 members.

Families	Members	Male	Female	Under 18 Years	18 Years & Over	Buddhist	Hindu	Islam	Christian	Other Religions	Sinhalese	Tamil	Muslim	Others
1,176	5,689	2,866	2,823	1,883	3,806	1,203	2,456	622	1,408	0	1,277	3,704	622	86
