= Thambalagamuwa railway station =

Railway station in Sri Lanka

Thambalagamuwa railway station தம்பலகமம் තඹලගමුව දුම්රිය ස්ථානය

General information
- Location: Thambalagamuwa; Sri Lanka
- Coordinates: 8°29′55.30″N 81°05′43.90″E
- System: Sri Lankan Railway Station
- Owner: Sri Lanka Railways
- Line: Trincomalee line

Other information
- Status: Functioning

History
- Opened: 1927

Services
Preceding station	Sri Lanka Railways	Following station
Mullipotana	Trincomalee line	China Bay
Location

Thambalagamuwa railway station is a railway station in the town of Thambalagamuwa in eastern Sri Lanka. Owned by Sri Lanka Railways, the state-owned railway operator, the station is part of the Trincomalee line which links Trincomalee District with the capital Colombo. The station opened in 1927, with the creation of the Trincomalee line.

== See also ==
- List of railway stations in Sri Lanka
- List of railway stations in Sri Lanka by line
