= Villundy =

Villundy வில்லூன்றி විළ්ළුන්ඩිය
- Village
- Location within Sri Lanka
- Coordinates: 8°34′1″N 81°13′56″E
- Country: Sri Lanka
- Province: Eastern
- District: Trincomalee
- DS Division: Town & Gravets

Villundy (Tamil: வில்லூன்றி) is a village administrative division in Trincomalee Town and Gravets in Trincomalee, Sri Lanka. As of 2005, Villundy consists of 732 families with 4269 members. This area consists of Parts of Trincomalee Courts, Dockyard Road, St Mary's Street, Cathedral Street, Bakery Road, Gorge Road, Barathi Road, Fatima Road, Kadasamy Kovil Road, Inner Harbour Road and Lavendor Road.

Families	Members	Male	Female	Under 18 Years	18 Years & Over	Buddhist	Hindu	Islam	Christian	Other Religions	Sinhalese	Tamil	Muslim	Others
732	4,269	2,191	2,078	974	3,295	21	3,802	9	427	10	104	4,043	9	113
