= Trincomalee railway station =

Railway station in Trincomalee, Sri Lanka

Trincomalee திருகோணமலை ත්‍රිකුණාමලය
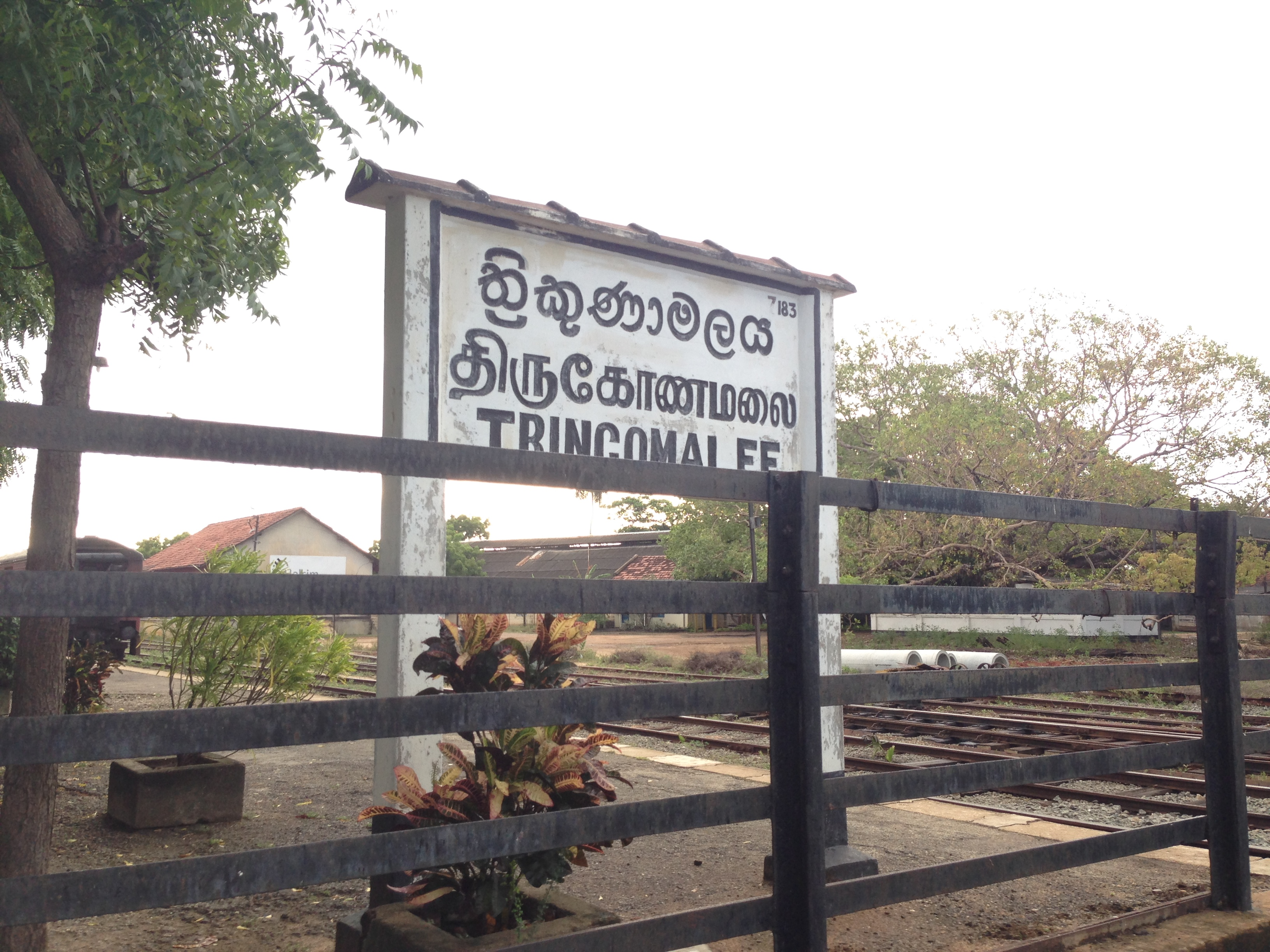
- Trincomalee railway station in October 2015

General information
- Location: Trincomalee; Sri Lanka
- Coordinates: 8°35′04″N 81°13′34″E
- System: Sri Lankan Railway Station
- Owner: Sri Lanka Railways
- Line: Trincomalee Line

Other information
- Status: Functioning

Services
Preceding station	Sri Lanka Railways	Following station
China Bay	Trincomalee Line	Terminus
Location
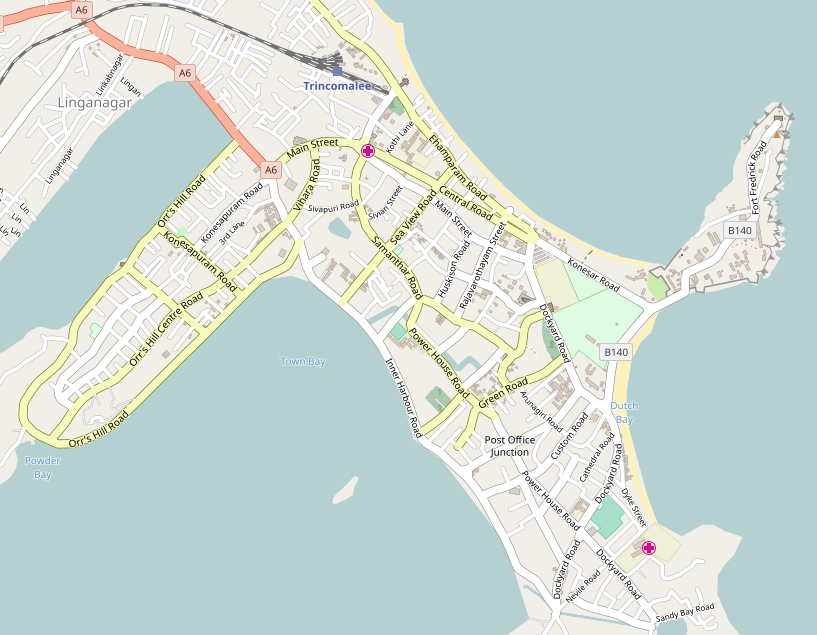
- Location within Central Trincomalee

Trincomalee railway station is a railway station in the city of Trincomalee in eastern Sri Lanka. Owned by Sri Lanka Railways, the state-owned railway operator, the station is the eastern terminus of the Trincomalee Line which links Trincomalee District with the capital Colombo.

== Services ==
Intercity trains operating from Trincomalee station connect Trincomalee with Colombo Fort and other cities along parts of the Trincomalee, Batticaloa, Northern, and Main Lines. Rail bus also operates at Trincomalee, providing services within the Eastern Province.

== See also ==
- List of railway stations in Sri Lanka
- List of railway stations by line order in Sri Lanka
