= Gal Oya Junction =

Railway Station in Sri Lanka

Gal Oya Junction ගල් ඔය හන්දිය

General information
- Coordinates: 8.1378°N 80.8657°E
- Owner: Sri Lanka Railways
- Line: Batticaloa line / Trincomalee line

Other information
- Status: Functioning
- Station code: GOA
Location
- Location within Sri Lanka

Gal Oya Junction (Sinhala: ගල් ඔය හන්දිය) is a railway station in the North Central Province of Sri Lanka.

The station is a junction station, where the Trincomalee line branches off from the Batticaloa line. It is owned and operated by Sri Lanka Railways.

It is 227 km (141 mi) away from Colombo Fort Railway Station, at an elevation of about 87 m (285 ft) metres above sea level. Usually over 24 trains run weekly.

== Continuity ==
Preceding station	Sri Lanka Railways	Following station
Hatares Kotuwa	Batticaloa line	Minneriya
Terminus	Trincomalee line	Akbopura
