= Minneriya railway station =

Railway station in Sri Lanka

Minneriya Railway Station මින්නේරිය දුම්රිය නැවතුම්පොළ

General information
- Location: Galoya, Sri Lanka
- Coordinates: 8.0665°N 80.8946°E
- Owner: Sri Lanka Railways
- Line: Batticaloa line
Location
- Location within Sri Lanka

Minneriya Railway Station (Sinhala: මින්නේරිය දුම්රිය නැවතුම්පොළ) is a railway station in the North Central Province of Sri Lanka.

The station is located on the Batticaloa line and is owned by Sri Lanka Railways.

It is 235 km (146 mi) away from Colombo Fort Railway Station, and 10 km (6.2 mi) from the Gal Oya Junction, at an elevation of about 90 m (300 ft) above sea level.

== Continuity ==
Preceding station	Sri Lanka Railways	Following station
Gal Oya Junction	Batticaloa line	Hingurankgoda
