= Thampalakamam =

Thampalakamam தம்பலகாமம் තඹලගමුව
- Town
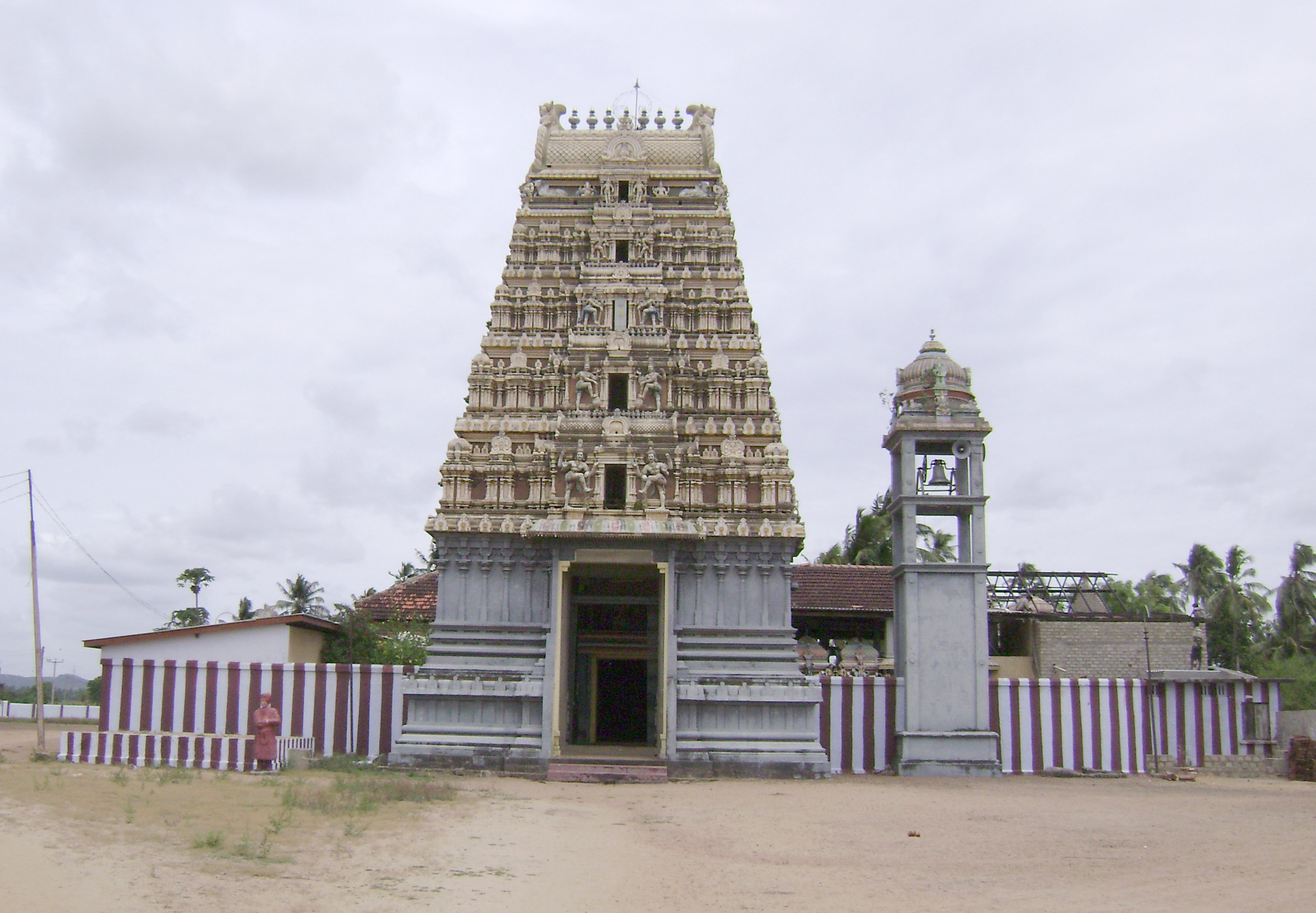
- Aathi Koneswarar Temple

- Location within Sri Lanka
- Coordinates: 8°31′0″N 81°5′0″E
- Country: Sri Lanka
- Province: Eastern
- District: Trincomalee
- DS Division: Thampalakamam

Thampalakamam (Tamil: தம்பலகாமம், romanized: Tampalakāmam; Sinhala: තඹලගමුව, romanized: Tam̆balagamuva) is a town in the Trincomalee District of Sri Lanka and it is located about 20 km South-West of Trincomalee. It is also known as Tampainakar in Tamil chronicles written during the 17th century. Portuguese colonial officers who came to the general area after 1622 with the destruction of the Koneswaram temple, described the village as prosperous and large. It was the seat of government of medieval feudal lords of the area who had control over a region called Tampalakamam Pattu. It became the refuge of Hindus and their idols that were saved from the destruction of the temple of Koneswaram. Ati Konanayakar a successor temple was constructed in Thampalakamam. During the Sri Lankan civil war in the 1980s and 1990s the village and the surrounding area were severely affected, leading to massacres and depopulation. The village was resettled after 2002.

== Transport ==
- Thambalagamuwa railway station

== See also ==
- Thampalakamam massacre
- Ati Konanayakar
