= Thampalakamam massacre =

Killing of eight Tamil civilians in Sri Lanka

Thampalakamam massacre happened on 1 February 1998 when eight Sri Lankan Tamil civilians were taken to the nearby police station and shot dead by Sri Lankan Police and Sinhalese home guards in Thampalakamam, Trincomalee District. The victims include two brothers aged 13 and 17.

== Massacre ==
On 1 February 1998, at 5.30 am, about 20 drunken policemen and home guards from two Sinhalese settlements launched a roundup of two neighbouring Tamil villages of Puthukkudiyiruppu and Potkerni in Thampalakamam, Trincomalee District. They went around pulling Tamil villagers out of their houses, severely assaulting them and shooting dead their cows and dogs. Several individuals were detained and taken to the police station. Some were released but eight individuals were shot dead at close range. Several bodies of the victims bore signs of torture. The victims were Ponnambalam Kanagasaby (48), Arumugam Segar (32), Gunaratnam Sivarajah (27), Subramaniam Thivakaran (23), Muruges Janakan (17), Amirthalingam Surendran (14), Amirthalingam Gajendran (17) and Nathan Pavalanathan (33). The schoolboy Arumugam Segar had his penis cut off and placed in his mouth.

== Investigation and trial ==
Following the massacre, the Kantalai Police reportedly pressured the families to sign statements stating that the victims were members of the LTTE or were killed by them. However, the identities of the culprits were confirmed at a magisterial inquiry by the Officer-in-Charge (OIC) of the Kantalai Police station but the accused were not arrested and reportedly continued to be on active duty. In 2005, the Kantalai Police arrested 13 policemen and home guards and the Attorney General filed charges against them. However, in 2017 the charges against six of the accused were withdrawn. In 2024, the Anuradhapura High Court sentenced five of the accused police officers, including the OIC, of the Bharathipuram Police station to life imprisonment. One of the accused in the murder case had been shot dead by unknown gunmen in 2000.
