= Lankapatuna Samudragiri Viharaya =

Buddhist temple

- ලංකාපටුන සමුද්‍රගිරි විහාරය

Religion
- Affiliation: Buddhism
- District: Trincomalee
- Province: Eastern province

Location
- Location: Trincomalee, Sri Lanka
- Interactive map of Lankapatuna Samudragiri Viharaya
- Coordinates: 8.3572°N 81.3896°E

Architecture
- Type: Buddhist Temple
- Archaeological Protected Monument of Sri Lanka
- Designated: 7 March 2008

Lankapatuna Samudragiri Viharaya (Sinhala: ලංකාපටුන සමුද්‍රගිරි විහාරය) is a Buddhist temple situated in the Trincomalee District, Eastern province of Sri Lanka. This temple which is situated near the ocean near the historic Port of Lankapatuna where Prince Dantha and Princess Hemamala set foot in Sri Lanka bringing the Sacred Tooth Relic of the Buddha. The ruins of the ancient Temple has been heavily damaged by the civil war and tsunami but ruins of an ancient Dageba, Korawak Gal (a type of ancient balustrades), a pond and other ruins of the ancient temple scattered around an area of 50 acres are still visible but a new Temple complex has been built near the ancient Temple's ruins.

== History ==
Lankapatuna was an ancient port in Sri Lanka notable for being the location where the Tooth Relic of Buddha was brought to Sri Lanka in the 4th century AD. In order to the protect the relic from a losing war the Kalinga ruler, King Guhasiva sent the relic at the hands of Prince Dantha and Princess Hemamala who left India from Tamralipta and sailed to the port of Lankapatuna which was situated at a straight line from Tamralipta.

The Samudragiri temple is believed to have been built near the entrance of the port for the worship of merchants and travellers.

=== Modern History ===
In 1975, the Buddhist monk Sumedhamkara claimed a Hindu temple had been built near the site and complained of damage done to the Buddhist ruins. Further in the late 90s and early 2000s the separatist militant Liberation Tigers of Tamil Eelam (LTTE) used the area as a communication center and demolished a stony rock with six epigraphs to fix a LTTE radio transmission tower, the LTTE also built a kovil at the site in 2003 and a Sea Tiger base. However, after the end of the war the military defeated the LTTE and demolished both LTTE structures and began building a new temple complex.

In 2017 a new 150m long bridge across the lagoon to the temple complex was opened by President Maithripala Sirisena alongside the leader of the Tamil National Alliance R.Sampanthan.
