= Vijayaba National College =

Location
- Maho; Sri Lanka
- Coordinates: 7°49′22″N 80°16′40″E

Information
- Type: Public
- Motto: නොනවතින්න පෙරට යන්න
- Established: January 1946
- Founder: C. W. W. Kannangara
- Principal: D.M. Bandula Dissanayake
- Grades: Class 1 - 13
- Gender: Mix
- Age: 6 to 19
- Enrollment: 3000
- Campus: 27 acres (110,000 m^{2})
- Colours: Red, Yellow, Blue & Green
- Website: www.vijayaba.sch.lk

Vijayaba National College, Maho, is a government school established in 1946, and is one out of the 25 central schools pioneered by the minister of education C. W. W. Kannangara with the idea of promoting education in rural areas and to give equal facilities for the students in those schools. Vijayaba National College is one of the leading schools in the Maho town with a student population of approximately 3000.

== History ==
Founded in 1946, Vijayaba National College is a school in Maho town with a student population of approximately 3000. It is situated in Maho, and is one of the 25 central schools pioneered by the minister of education Mr. C. W. W. Kannangara with the idea of promoting education in rural areas and giving equal facilities for the students in those schools. The school was opened temporarily at the Balalla Boys School on 3 January 1946 with 13 students and five teachers. Very soon the new buildings were built in Maho town and the school was shifted to Maho on 3 January 1947. From then onward it has offered a lot of educated people to various fields in the country.

The facilities at College include the two hostels for boys and girls, a Computer Assisted Learning Center, two science laboratories, a home science section, two buildings for life skills practice, an aesthetic section, a multimedia unit, a special care unit for disabilities, a library and a canteen.

The College has more than 15 clubs and societies. Vijayaba has a large play ground and other sports facilities for students.

== The School Today ==
Today the Vijayaba National College consists of Large play ground; two Libraries; an auditorium; a two floor building (for the primary section); computer labs with more than 20 computers; a dental centre; well equipped botanical, zoological, physical & chemical labs; two hostels (Boys & Girls); an O/L Science Laboratory; a co-operative shop and many more facilities.

== Houses ==
The students are divided into four Houses:

- – Vijaya
- – Abhaya
- – Anura
- – Mihidu

The house names are derived from the past kings of Sri Lanka. The houses compete annually in all major games to win the respective inter-house games.

== Past Principals ==
| Name | Entered office | Departed Office |
|---|---|---|
| Mr R.D. Sirisena | 1946. 01. 03 | 1947. 10. 01 |
| Mr E.L. Wejemanna | 1947. 10. 01 | 1948. 01. 01 |
| Mr R.D. Sirisena | 1948. 01. 05 | 1949. 04. 29 |
| Mr H.L. Rathnapala | 1949. 04. 29 | 1951. 01. 01 |
| Mr B.R. Balase | 1951. 01. 02 | 1952. 05. 11 |
| Mr B. Jayasooriya | 1952. 05. 11 | 1952. 09. 30 |
| Mr J.W.E. Amarasekara | 1952. 09. 30 | 1953. 01. 05 |
| Mr L.L.P. Kbral | 1953. 01. 05 | 1954. 01. 07 |
| Mr K.A. Velupille | 1954. 01. 07 | 1955. 01. 04 |
| Mr D.A. Jayathilaka | 1955. 01. 04 | 1957. 02. 02 |
| Mr K.A. Velupille | 1957. 02. 02 | 1957. 03. 01 |
| Mr R.B. Gallella | 1957. 03. 01 | 1961. 01. 02 |
| Mr S.Y. Abyawardana | 1961. 01. 02 | 1961. 05. 01 |
| Mr P.M. Kumaradasa | 1961. 05. 01 | 1968. 05. 07 |
| Mr D.C. Rajapaksha | 1968. 05. 07 | 1970. 10. 01 |
| Mr G.W. Keerthiwansha | 1970. 10. 01 | 1974. 09. 01 |
| Mr P.M. Kumaradasa | 1974. 09. 01 | 1975. 05. 08 |
| Mr D.R. Athalage | 1975. 05. 08 | 1979. 03. 13 |
| Mr L.H.B. Aberathna | 1979. 03. 13 | 1983. 06. 16 |
| Mr P.M. Kumaradasa | 1983. 06. 17 | 1984. 02. 29 |
| Mr P.M. Piyadasa | 1984. 03. 01 | 1984. 05. 31 |
| Mr W. Thennakon | 1984. 06. 01 | 1988. 10. 04 |
| Mr D.M. Herath Banda | 1988. 10. 05 | 1991. 01. 22 |
| Mr P.M. Piyadasa | 1991. 01. 23 | 1991. 10. 31 |
| Mr W.M. Abesinghe | 1991. 11. 01 | 1994. 09. 19 |
| Mr T.M.H. Thennakon | 1994. 09. 20 | 1996. 08. 20 |
| Mr D.M.C. Dissanayake | 1996. 08. 20 | 1997. 03. 27 |
| Mr E. Upasena | 1997. 03. 27 | 1999. 07. 22 |
| Mr J.M.S.B. Jayasundara | 1999. 07. 22 | 2000. 02. 01 |
| Mr L.W. Somathilakee | 2000. 02. 01 | 2002. 11. 28 |
| Mr D.M.C. Dissanayake | 2002. 11. 28 | 2004. 10. 10 |
| Mr D.G. Ghnamali Diviyagahagedara | 2004. 10. 11 | 2007. 11. 11 |
| Mr K.M. Dissanayake | 2007. 11. 11 | 2010. 09. 23 |
