= Maho, Sri Lanka =

Maho මහව
- city
- Location within Sri Lanka
- Coordinates: 7°49′00″N 80°15′00″E
- Country: Sri Lanka
- District: Kurunegala
- Time zone: UTC+5:30 (SLST)
- Sri Lanka Post: 60600
- Area code: 037

Mahawa (also known as Maho) (Sinhala: මහව) is a town in the North Western Province of Sri Lanka. It is located in the Kurunegala District. Buddhists, Muslims, Hindus and Christians live in this town. The town is situated 4 kilometres (2.5 mi) north-west of the Yapahuwa Rock Fortress. In addition the area contains some famous irrigation tanks such as "Mediyawa" and "Abakolawewa".

== Transport ==
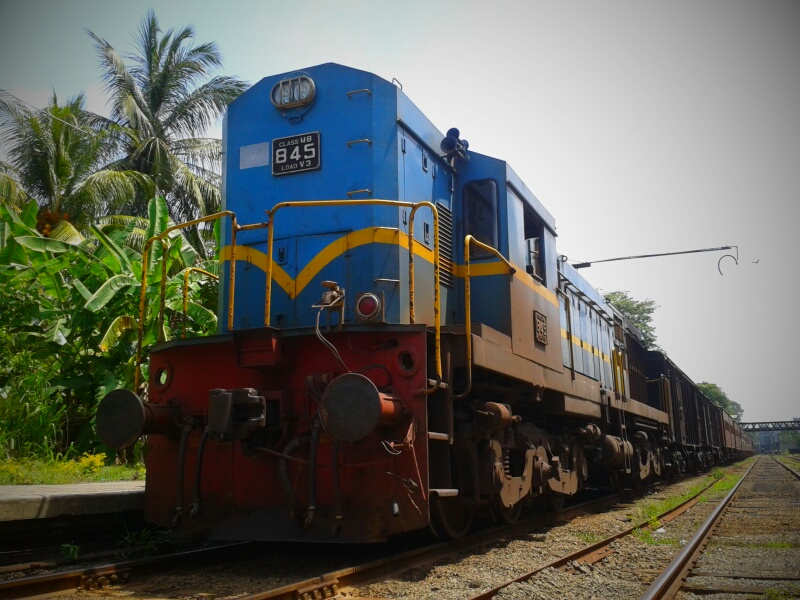
Maho junction railway station

It has a railway station, Maho railway station (also known as Mahawa railway station), which is located on the Northern line, which runs from Polgahawela to Kankesanthurai. It is near the junction of the Northern Line and the Batticaloa Line.

== Education ==
Education is delivered free of charge to all students of national schools, according to the government policy. These schools operate under both Government and Provincial Council.

Schools in the area
- Vijayaba National College
- Balalla U.B.Wanninayaka Navodya School
- Yapahuwa Madya Maha Vidyalaya
- Koonwewa Madya Vidyalaya
- Bagmeegahawaththa Maha Vidyalaya
- Moragolla Maha Vidyalaya(Makaduwawa)
- Al Madeena Maha Vidyalaya (Tamil Medium School)
