= Verugal Divisional Secretariat =

- Divisional Secretariat
- Country: Sri Lanka
- Province: Eastern Province
- District: Trincomalee District
- Time zone: UTC+5:30 (Sri Lanka Standard Time)

Verugal Divisional Secretariat is a Divisional Secretariat of Trincomalee District, of Eastern Province, Sri Lanka.

== Demography-Religion ==
Religion in Verugal DS Division (2012)
1. Buddhist (0.40%)
2. Hindu (95.2%)
3. Muslim (0.10%)
4. Roman Catholic (0.20%)
5. Other Christian (4.10%)
6. Other (0.00%)
