= Sakthi Arulanandam =

Indian poet (born 1962)

Arulmozhi
- Born: 1962 (age 63–64)
- Writing career
- Pen name: Sakthi Arulanandam

Arulmozhi (born 1962) known under the pen name of Sakthi Arulanandam, is an Indian ecofeminist poet, author and artist from the state of Tamil Nadu. She has been the recipient of the Tanjai Prakash Award, the Sikaram Award and the Tiruppur Arima Sakthi Award for her poetry. Arulanandam is also described as a successful artists whose paintings have featured in a number of small magazines. According to The Hindu, her working-class background, dignity for labour and a passion for art and a world of ideas has left an influential mark in her contributions to Tamil literature.

== Biography ==
She was born in the village of Sevvaipettai in the Salem district of Tamil Nadu and became an electrical repair worker for a living while remaining unmarried. In her testimony, she states that after her mother died when she was in 9th grade, she had to quit school to help in household chores and that she decided to remain unmarried because she didn't want to follow the same old path of serving a man. She had continued to read the works of Tamil writers such as Jayakanthan and Akilan and cleared her 10th grade (secondary education) at a later date for a typewriting job. At the same time she began working as an assistant at an electrical repair shop and eventually learned how to do repairs herself, deciding to stick to it as there were no fixed working hours at such shops and she could dedicate some of her time to reading, writing and drawing. Her first poems were published when she was 17–18 years old which was published in the Maalai Malar. As of January 2019, Arulanandam has three published anthologies of her poems and twenty five short stories.

== Selected works ==
- Irunmaiyilirunthu (From Darkness)
- Paravaikal Purakkanitha Nagaram (The City Deserted by Birds)
- Thoduvanamattra Kadal (The Horizonless Ocean)
