= Muttur Divisional Secretariat =

- Divisional Secretariat
- Country: Sri Lanka
- Province: Eastern Province
- District: Trincomalee District
- Time zone: UTC+5:30 (Sri Lanka Standard Time)

The Muttur Divisional Secretariat is a Divisional Secretariat of Trincomalee District, of Eastern Province, Sri Lanka.

== Demography-Religion ==
Religion in Muttur DS Division (2012)
1. Buddhist (0.80%)
2. Hindu (33.0%)
3. Muslim (62.0%)
4. Roman Catholic (2.60%)
5. Other Christian (1.60%)
6. Other (0.00%)
