= Mutur =

Mutur மூதூர் මුතූර්
- Town
- Location within Sri Lanka
- Coordinates: 8°27′14″N 81°15′56″E
- Country: Sri Lanka
- Province: Eastern
- District: Trincomalee
- DS Division: Muttur

Population (2012) (Note: Population estimated by combining populations of component Grama Niladhari districts: Naduthivu, Muttur East, Thahanagar, Neithalnagar, Thaqwanagar, Muttur West, Muttur Central, Jayanagar, Periyapalam, Palanagar, Alimnagar, and Kadarkaraichenai)
  - Total: 23,652

Mutur, also spelled Muthur or Muttur, is a town in the Trincomalee District of Sri Lanka, located about 25 km south of Trincomalee, on the southern side of Trincomalee Harbour. In Tamil it translates to 'ancient village'. Mutur is mostly accessed by sea route. After 2010, a new seaside road was built to link with Trincomalee town via Kinniya.

It is said that the business of pearl bathing was popular in the early days of this city, which depends on the sea and hence the name Muttur was given to this town. But over time, the name has changed to Maruvi Muthur. Muslim people live here and Tamil people live in Sampur, the eastern part of Muthur.

In 2006, it was the site of a massacre of employees of the non-governmental organization Action Against Hunger.

== See also ==
- Mutur Electoral District
- 2006 Trincomalee massacre of NGO workers
