= Morawewa Divisional Secretariat =

- Divisional Secretariat
- Interactive map of Morawewa Divisional Secretariat
- Country: Sri Lanka
- Province: Eastern Province
- District: Trincomalee District
- Time zone: UTC+5:30 (Sri Lanka Standard Time)

Morawewa Divisional Secretariat is a Divisional Secretariat of Trincomalee District, of Eastern Province, Sri Lanka.

Religion in Morawewa DS Division (2012)
1. Buddhist (72.0%)
2. Hindu (10.5%)
3. Muslim (16.4%)
4. Roman Catholic (0.70%)
5. Other Christian (0.50%)
6. Other (0.00%)
