= Rajasundaram =

Rajasundaram Somasundaram
- Born: 23 March 1942; Jaffna, Northern Province, Sri Lanka
- Died: 27 July 1983 (aged 41); Welikada Prison, Colombo, Sri Lanka
- Occupations: Founding member of Gandhiyam, a Tamil social welfare organization, Registered Medical Practitioner (RMP)
- Known for: Sri Lankan Tamil nationalism, Humanitarian

Dr. S Rajasundaram was a Sri Lankan Tamil activist known for his struggle for the rights of Tamil people in Sri Lanka, through peaceful and democratic means. Along with his friend S.A. David, He founded Gandhiyam, a social service organization, named after the Indian revolutionary Mahatma Gandhi, that was aimed at economic, social, cultural revival of the Tamils and also fight the Sri Lankan state's repeated and continued policies of oppressing the Tamils and denying them of their rights. The Sri Lankan government unlawfully arrested along with him, several thousands Tamil activists and he was sentenced to the Welikada Prison where he was subsequently killed during the anti-Tamil pogrom of 1983.

== Social Work ==
Rajasundaram along with his friend and noted architect S.A. David, founded Gandhiyam to peacefully resist the Sri Lankan state terror through Gandhian principles and also lead the Tamil people to live as per the Gandhian ways of life. In a span of 5 years, the organization had a sound presence throughout the traditional homelands of the Tamils in Sri Lanka, in Jaffna, Kilinochchi, Mannar, Mullaitivu, Vavuniya, Trincomalee and Batticaloa.

At the time of their arrest, the organization had 450 pre schools with an average of thirty students each were providing daily milk and triposha and Kindergarten teaching facilities to village children. Mobile clinics equipped with basic preventive and curative medicine were making regular rounds to outlying villages. A training center was preparing thirty to forty young women, every three months for Gandhiyam work in their own villages. In addition, Gandhiyam with other social service organizations was assisting 5,000 refugee families from Tea Estates to settle down to safe life among the traditional Tamil villages.

== Arrest and murder ==
After constant monitoring and crackdown of their social activities by the Sri Lankan government forces, Rajasundaram along with David were finally arrested in April, 1983, under the infamous PTA.

The charges consisted of:

1. Meeting Uma Maheswaran and not informing the police
2. Meeting Santhathiar and not informing the police
3. Assisting Uma and Santhathiar to escape to India

Both were imprisoned for life for these charges. Following imprisonment, They were allegedly subject to both physical and mental forms of torture. Dr. Rajasunderam was severely attacked, his left arm dislocated, his ear drums broken and left on several occasions unconscious on the floor. On 25 July 1983, several Tamil inmates of the Welikada Prison, almost all of them exclusively detained under the PTA were attacked by Sinhala prisoners and guards as a part of the larger pogrom against Tamils. 35 including one 16-year-old were brutally murdered and dumped in front of a statue of the Buddha in the prison yard.

The remaining Tamil prisoners those who managed to survive the massacre were detained at the youth ward and the first floor of the prison. Two days later, on 27 July, armed Sinhalese prisoners broke into both these cells where Rajasundaram and David among others were housed. Nearly 40 prisoners armed with axes, swords, crowbars, iron pipes and wooden logs appeared before the cell and started to break the lock. Dr. Rajasundaram who went up to the door pleading with the assailants to give up their violence was dragged out by the group who killed him by smashing his head with an iron rod.
