= Kinniya Divisional Secretariat =

Kinniya City
- Divisional Secretariat
- Country: Sri Lanka
- Province: Eastern Province
- District: Trincomalee District
- Time zone: UTC+5:30 (Sri Lanka Standard Time)

Kinniya Divisional Secretariat is a Divisional Secretariat of Trincomalee District, of Eastern Province, Sri Lanka.

== Demography-Religion ==
Religion in Kinniya DS Division (2012)
1. Buddhist (0.40%)
2. Hindu (3.80%)
3. Muslim (95.8%)
4. Roman Catholic (0.10%)
5. Other Christian (0.00%)
6. Other (0.00%)
