= Padavi Sri Pura Divisional Secretariat =

- Divisional Secretariat
- Country: Sri Lanka
- Province: Eastern Province
- District: Trincomalee District
- Time zone: UTC+5:30 (Sri Lanka Standard Time)

Padavi Sri Pura Divisional Secretariat is a Divisional Secretariat of Trincomalee District, of Eastern Province, Sri Lanka.

Religion in Padavi Sri Pura DS Division (2012)
1. Buddhist (98.4%)
2. Hindu (0.10%)
3. Muslim (0.00%)
4. Roman Catholic (0.60%)
5. Other Christian (0.90%)
6. Other (0.00%)
