= S. A. David =

- எஸ். ஏ. டேவிட்
- Born: 24 April 1924
- Died: 11 October 2015 (aged 91); Kilinochchi, Sri Lanka
- Education: University of Melbourne
- Occupation: Architect

Solomon Arulanandam David (Tamil: சொலமன் அருளானந்தம் டேவிட்; 24 April 1924 – 11 October 2015) was a Sri Lankan Tamil architect, activist and founder of the Gandhiyam Movement.

== Early life ==
David was born on 24 April 1924 (Note: Another source gives David's date of birth as 6 November 1916.) and was from Karampon on the island of Velanaitivu in northern Ceylon. After school David won a scholarship to study architecture at the University of Melbourne, graduating with a B.Arch. degree.

== Career ==
After returning to Ceylon David worked as an assistant architect at the Public Works Department. Following the passing of the Sinhala Only Act he resigned. He went to the UK to study town planning in Leeds. He subsequently held several positions overseas including senior town planner in Liverpool and chief architect/town planner in Mombasa. Whilst in Mombasa David became interested in Gandhism, spending most evenings at Mombasa library studying the 9,000 books on India donated to the library by an Indian lawyer’s clerk. He returned to Sri Lanka in 1972 to devote his "heart and soul to alleviate the suffering" of his people.

David, along with S. Rajasundaram, founded the Gandhiyam Movement in 1977 in Vavuniya to teach the Gandhiyam way of life. By 1982 the Gandhiyam Movement was operating in Batticaloa District, Jaffna District, Kilinochchi District, Mannar District, Mullaitivu District, Trincomalee District and Vavuniya District, teaching over 10,000 children the Gandhiyam way of life, assisting refugees, setting up farms and distributing food. It worked with other local charities as well as international charities.

The Sri Lankan government accused the Gandhiyam Movement of training Tamil militants. On the night of 7 April 1983 David was staying at the YMCA in Colombo when the police, led by ASP Punya de Silva, arrived and started searching his room using the draconian Prevention of Terrorism Act. David was taken to the notorious 4th floor of the Criminal Investigation Department's headquarters in Colombo Fort. Rajasundaram was also arrested. David was assaulted, tortured and threatened by CID officers. He was then transferred to the Panagoda Cantonment where he was assaulted, tortured and humiliated by the Sri Lanka Army. Commander Udugampala would regularly threaten to kill David. School cadets were brought to watch Sri Lankan soldiers perform their sadism on the Tamil prisoners. The violence meted out to Rajasundaram was worse.

David and some other Tamil prisoners were transferred to Welikada Prison on 27 June 1983. Although there was no torture at Welikada, the conditions were terrible and Tamil prisoners who fell ill were treated badly by the Sinhalese medical staff. David and Rajasundaram were brought to court on 22 July 1983 and were told that they were being charged with meeting and assisting in the escape of People's Liberation Organisation of Tamil Eelam (PLOTE) leaders Uma Maheswaran and Santhathiar. The judge ordered David, Rajasundaram and a few other prisoners to be moved to the Welikada's Youth Ward.

On 25 July 1983 the Black July anti-Tamil riots spread to Welikada's Chapel Ward and around 35 Tamil prisoners were massacred by Sinhalese prisoners, aided and abetted by Sinhalese prison officers. Two days later armed Sinhalese prisoners broke into the Youth Ward and started attacking Tamil prisoners. Rajasundaram was dragged out of the cell and beaten to death. David and others managed to keep the attackers at bay until the Army arrived to disperse the attackers.

After the massacre Tamil prisoners, including David, were transported to Katunayake Airport by the Army but were ill treated and abused by soldiers along the journey. The Sri Lanka Air Force then flew them to Batticaloa Airport but, again, they were ill treated along the journey. From there they were taken to Batticaloa prison. The prisoners found out that a maximum security prison was being built in Homagama and, fearing a recurrence of the events at Welikada, they resolved to escape. On 27 September 1983 41 Tamil prisoners, including David, broke out of prison. David spent 27 days in the Vanni jungles before heading to Poonakari and on to Rameswaram, India by boat with the assistance of PLOTE. He arrived in Madras in 1984.

The Gandhiyam Movement helped the up-country Tamil victims of the Black July riots to resettle in the Vanni.

David lived in exile in Anna Nagar and wrote about the plight of Tamil refugees. He returned to Sri Lanka in 2015. He died on 11 October 2015 in Kilinochchi.
