= Kuchchaveli Divisional Secretariat =

- Divisional Secretariat
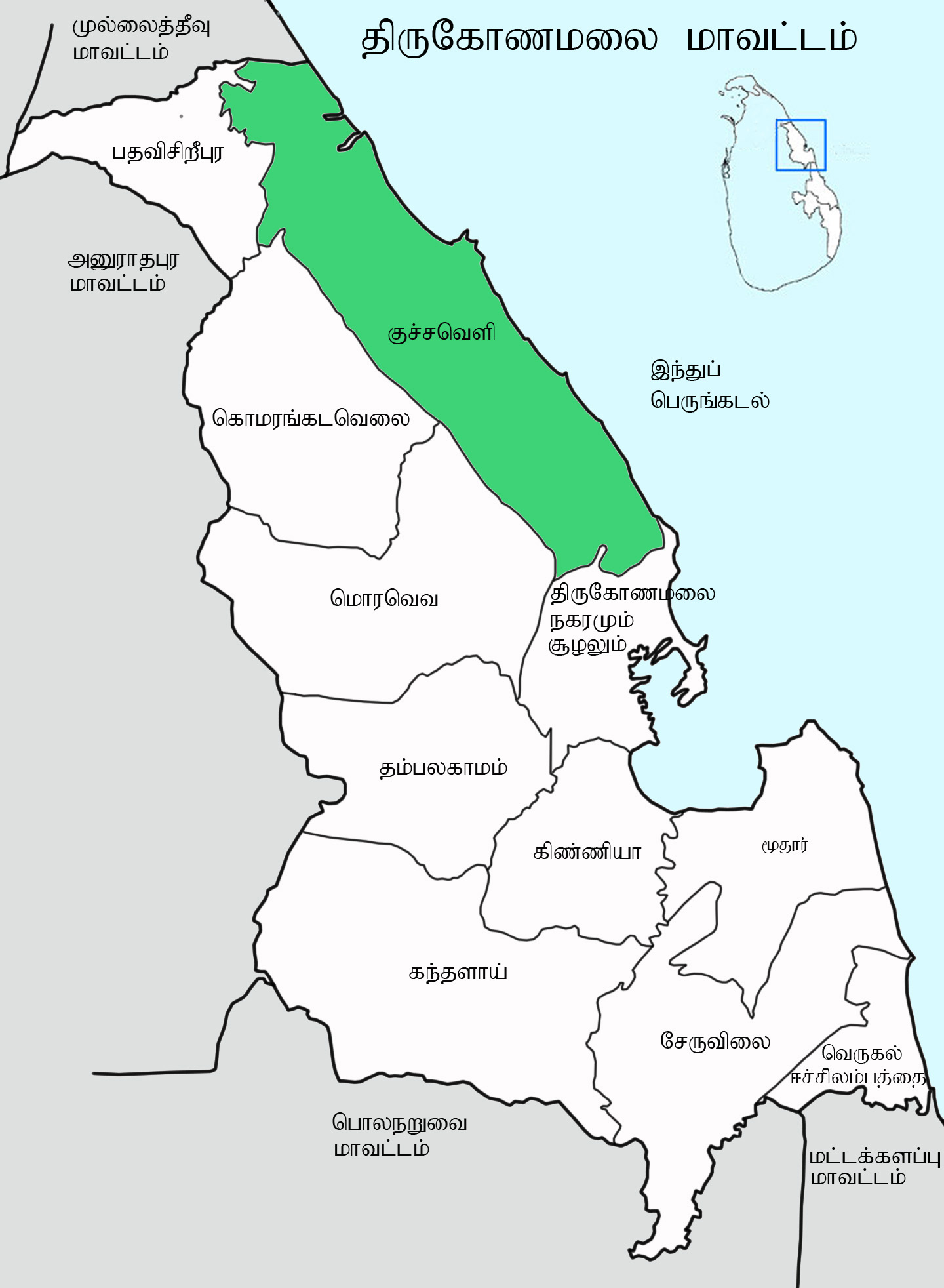
- A map of the Trincomalee District (in green) with the Kuchchaveli DS division marked
- Interactive map of Kuchchaveli Divisional Secretariat
- Country: Sri Lanka
- Province: Eastern Province
- District: Trincomalee District

Government
  - Divisional Secretary: A.Umamaheswaran

Area
  - Land: 121 sq mi (313 km^{2})
- Time zone: UTC+5:30 (Sri Lanka Standard Time)
- Website: www.kuchchaveli.ds.gov.lk

Kuchchaveli Divisional Secretariat is a Divisional Secretariat of Trincomalee District, of Eastern Province, Sri Lanka.

== Demography-Religion ==
Religion in Kuchchaveli DS Division (2012)
1. Buddhist (2.40%)
2. Hindu (27.6%)
3. Muslim (64.1%)
4. Roman Catholic (4.00%)
5. Other Christian (1.90%)
6. Other (0.00%)
