= Trincomalee line =

Railway line in Sri Lanka

Overview
- Status: Functioning
- Owner: Sri Lanka Railways
- Termini: Gal Oya Junction; Trincomalee
- Stations: 7

Service
- Type: Regional rail
- System: Sri Lanka Railways
- Operator: Sri Lanka Railways

History
- Opened: 1927; 99 years ago

Technical
- Line length: 70 km (43 mi)
- Number of tracks: 1
- Track gauge: 1,676 mm (5 ft 6 in)
- Electrification: No

The Trincomalee line is a railway line in Sri Lanka. Branching off the Batticaloa line at Gal Oya Junction, the line heads north-east through North Central and Eastern provinces before terminating at the eastern city of Trincomalee. The line is 70 kilometres (43 mi) long and has nine stations. The line opened in 1927. The rail line was originally called the Batticaloa-Trincomalee Light Railway, as only locomotives with light axle loads were permitted. The circuitous route led to some rail employees wondering if the construction costs were paid on a mileage basis, with a manager stating "it followed the path of an intelligent cow". In the 1950s the route was deviated removing a number of sharp curves and steep gradients together with a switch to heavier rails to match the rest of the country's rail system.
