= Thambalagamuwa Divisional Secretariat =

Thampalakamam Divisional Secretariat
- Divisional Secretariat
- Location within Sri Lanka
- Country: Sri Lanka
- Province: Eastern Province
- District: Trincomalee District
- Time zone: UTC+5:30 (Sri Lanka Standard Time)

Thampalakamam Divisional Secretariat is a Divisional Secretariat of Trincomalee District, of Eastern Province, Sri Lanka.

== Demography-Religion ==
Religion in Thambalagamuwa DS Division (2012)
1. Buddhist (23.7%)
2. Hindu (17.1%)
3. Muslim (57.0%)
4. Roman Catholic (0.40%)
5. Other Christian (1.80%)
6. Other (0.00%)
