= Seruvila Divisional Secretariat =

Seruvil Divisional Secretariat
- Divisional Secretariat
- Country: Sri Lanka
- Province: Eastern Province
- District: Trincomalee District
- Time zone: UTC+5:30 (Sri Lanka Standard Time)

Seruvila Divisional Secretariat is a Divisional Secretariat of Trincomalee District, of Eastern Province, Sri Lanka.

== Demography-Religion ==
Religion in Seruvila DS Division (2012)
1. Buddhist (64.6%)
2. Hindu (16.6%)
3. Muslim (17.8%)
4. Roman Catholic (0.40%)
5. Other Christian (0.50%)
6. Other (0.10%)
