= Batticaloa line =

Railway line in Sri Lanka

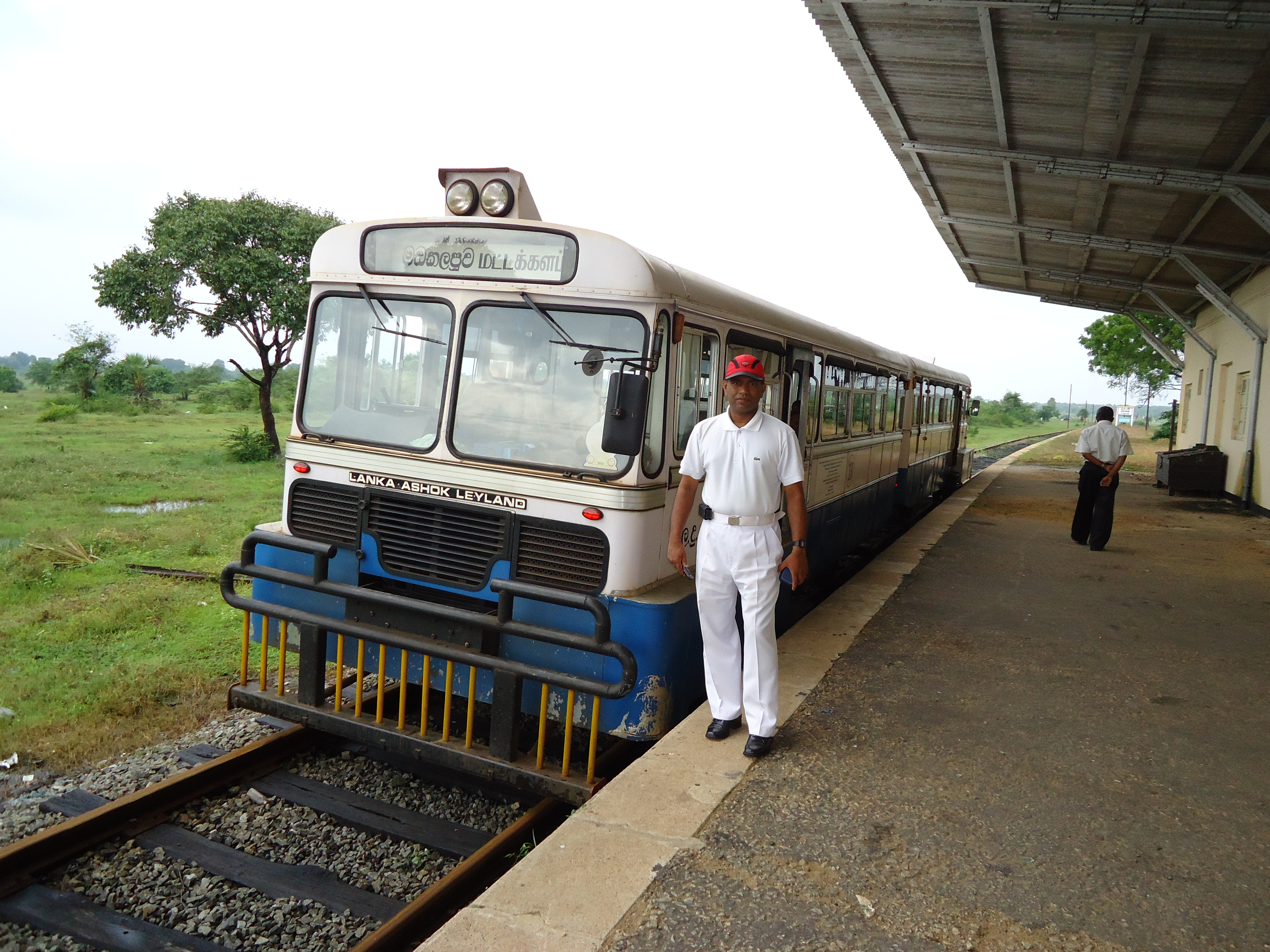
- Rail bus in Punani railway station

Overview
- Owner: Sri Lanka Railways
- Termini: Maho Junction; Batticaloa
- Stations: 31

Service
- Type: Inter-city rail and regional rail
- System: Sri Lanka Railways
- Services: *Udaya Devi Express Train; *Pulathisi Intercity Express train *Meenagaya night Intercity express train *Maho-Batticaloa mix train
- Operator: Sri Lanka Railways

History
- Opened: 1928

Technical
- Line length: 212 km (132 mi)
- Number of tracks: 1
- Track gauge: 1,676 mm (5 ft 6 in)
- Electrification: No

The Batticaloa line is a railway line in Sri Lanka. Branching off the Northern line at Maho Junction, the line heads east through North Central Province and south-easterly through Eastern Province before terminating at the eastern city of Batticaloa. The line is 212 kilometres (132 mi) long and has 31 stations. The line opened in 1928. There were no services on the Polonnaruwa-Batticaloa stretch of the line between 31 October 1996 and 12 April 2003 due to the civil war. The Udaya Devi service operates on the line.

== Route definition ==
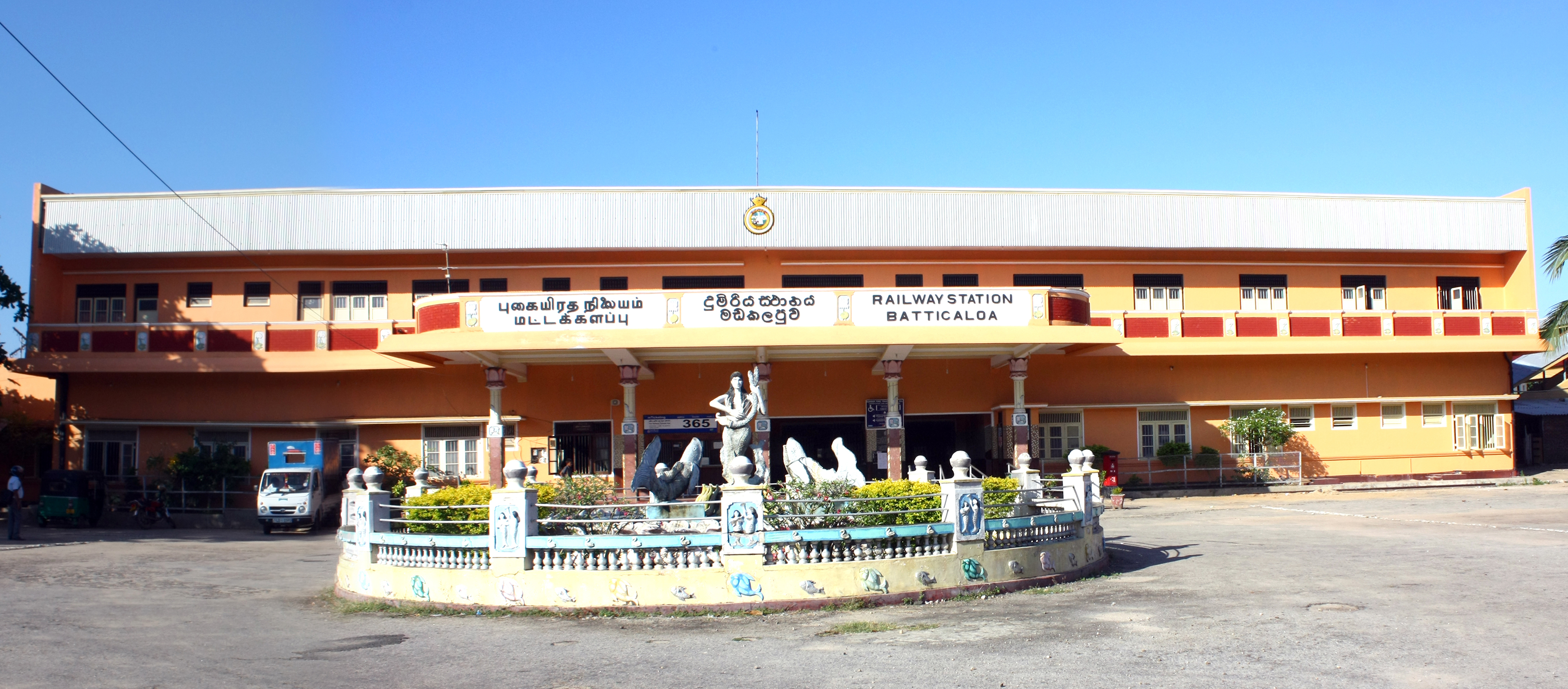

The Batticaloa line runs through the North Central and Eastern Provinces, connecting Mahawa (Maho Junction) on the Northern Line with the eastern city of Batticaloa.

The line runs east of Maho Junction towards Habarana. At Habarana, the construction of a new line to connect to Kurunegala has been proposed in June 2013 to cut short journey times between Colombo and Batticaloa-line destinations. East of Habarana, the Trincomalee Line diverges off the Batticaloa line at Gal Oya towards the port city of Trincomalee. The Batticaloa line continues south-east towards Polonnaruwa before continuing to Batticaloa terminus.

== History ==
The Batticaloa line opened in 1928, as a light railway. Only locomotives with light axel loads were used on the line.

In the 1950s, the route was upgraded to support 5 ft 6 in (1,676 mm) broad gauge operation, under the administration of then CGR General Manager B. D. Rampala. Sharp curves and steep gradients were eased, as well as the change to heavier rails, to match the rest of the system.

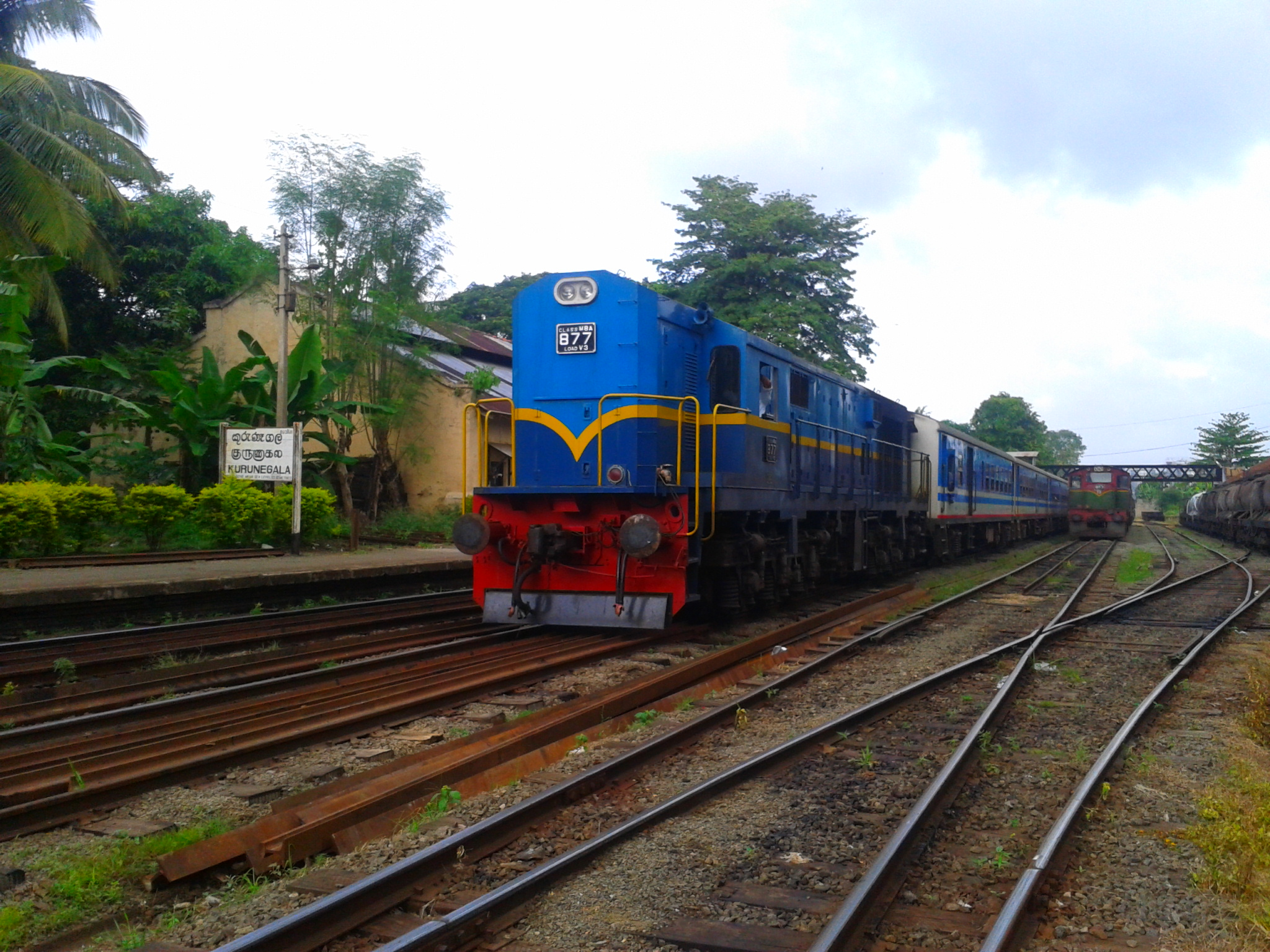
Udaya Dewi Train at Kurunegala, before the Batticaloa line branches off the Northern line

Between 31 October 1996 and 12 April 2003, there were no services on the Polonnaruwa-Batticaloa stretch of the line, due to the civil war.

== Operation ==
Sri Lanka Railways operates the Udaya Devi service on the Batticaloa line. The service connects Colombo Fort with Batticaloa.

Railbus service is provided for local services without significant demand. Railbus services allow SLR to meet local needs without stressing its limited rolling stock.

== Infrastructure ==
The Batticaloa line is entirely single track, at 5 ft 6 in (1,676 mm) broad gauge.

The line is not electrified. Regular services run on diesel power, including the railbus services. The line currently operates on a lock-and-block signaling system.

== Stations ==
=== Kalawewa ===
Kalawewa Railway Station
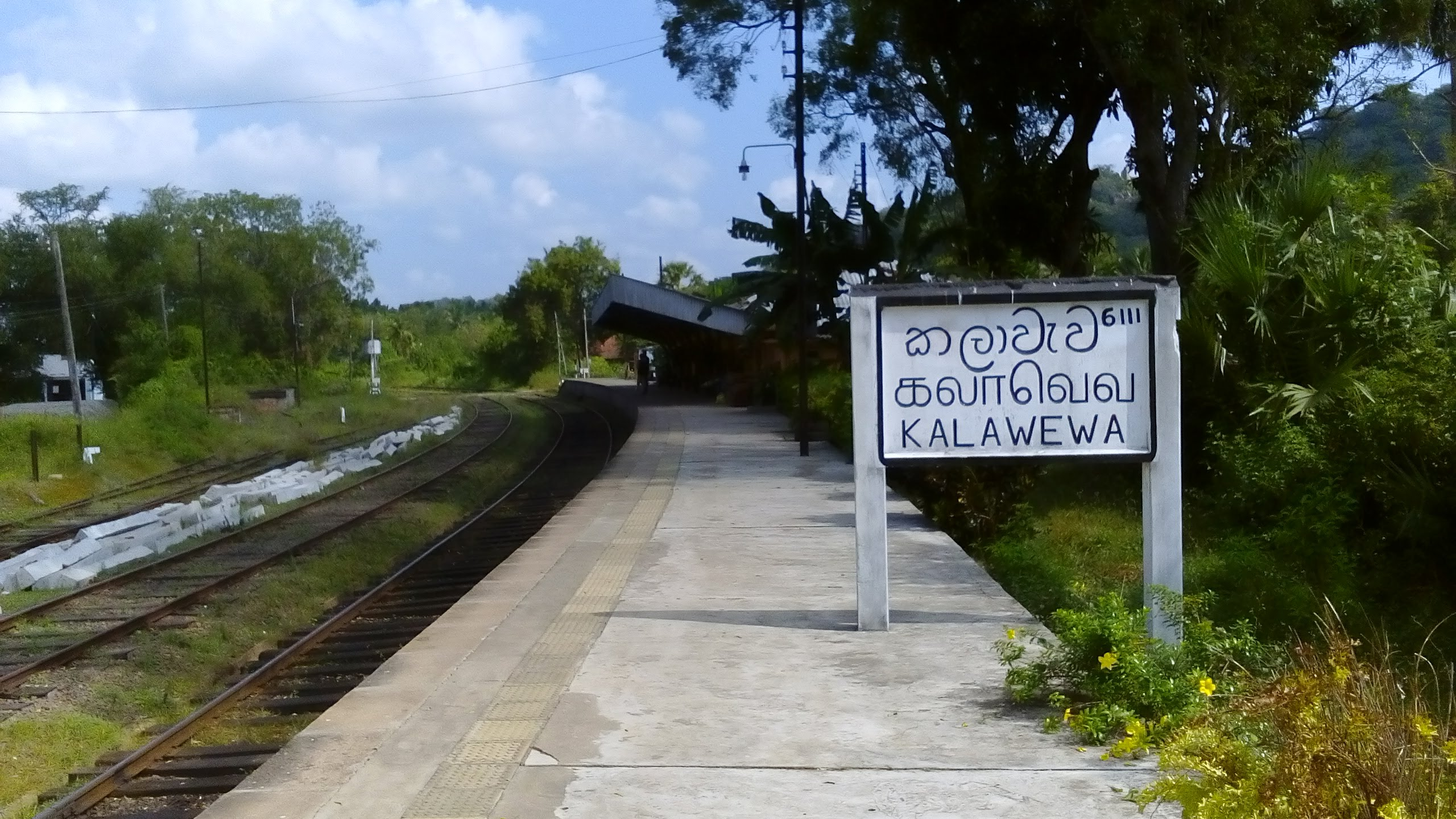
- West-end view of the station

General information
- Coordinates: 8.0234°N 80.5311°E
- Elevation: 115.65 m (379.4 ft)
- Owner: Sri Lanka Railways
- Line: Batticaloa line
- Tracks: 1

Other information
- Station code: KLW

Services
Preceding station	Sri Lanka Railways	Following station
Awukana	Batticaloa Line trains	Ihalagama
Location

Kalawewa Railway Station (Sinhala: කලාවැව දුම්රිය ස්ථානය) is a railway station in the town of Kalawewa in the North Central region of Sri Lanka. Owned by Sri Lanka Railways, the state-owned railway operator, the station is part of the Batticaloa line which links Batticaloa District with the capital Colombo. The railway station is in close proximity to the historic Kalawewa Reservoir and other local landmarks like Yodha Ela.

==== Tourism ====
Kalawewa Railway Station is a preferred stop for those visiting the Avukana Buddha Statue, one of Sri Lanka's most iconic ancient sculptures, located a short drive from the station. The scenic beauty of the Kala Wewa reservoir and the lush greenery of the region attract both domestic and international tourists

== See also ==
- Sri Lanka Railways
- Railway stations in Sri Lanka
- List of railway stations by line order in Sri Lanka
