= Trincomalee Divisional Secretariat =

- Divisional Secretariat
- Interactive map of Trincomalee Divisional Secretariat
- Country: Sri Lanka
- Province: Eastern Province
- District: Trincomalee District
- Time zone: UTC+5:30 (Sri Lanka Standard Time)

Trincomalee Divisional Secretariat is a Divisional Secretariat of Trincomalee District, of Eastern Province, Sri Lanka.

== Demography-Religion ==
Religion in Trincomalee DS Division (2012)
1. Buddhist (20.7%)
2. Hindu (49.0%)
3. Muslim (13.8%)
4. Roman Catholic (11.4%)
5. Other Christian (5.00%)
6. Other (0.00%)
