= Trincomalee District =

Administrative district in Eastern, Sri Lanka

Trincomalee District திருக்கோணமலை மாவட்டம் ත්‍රිකුණාමළය දිස්ත්‍රික්කය
- Administrative District
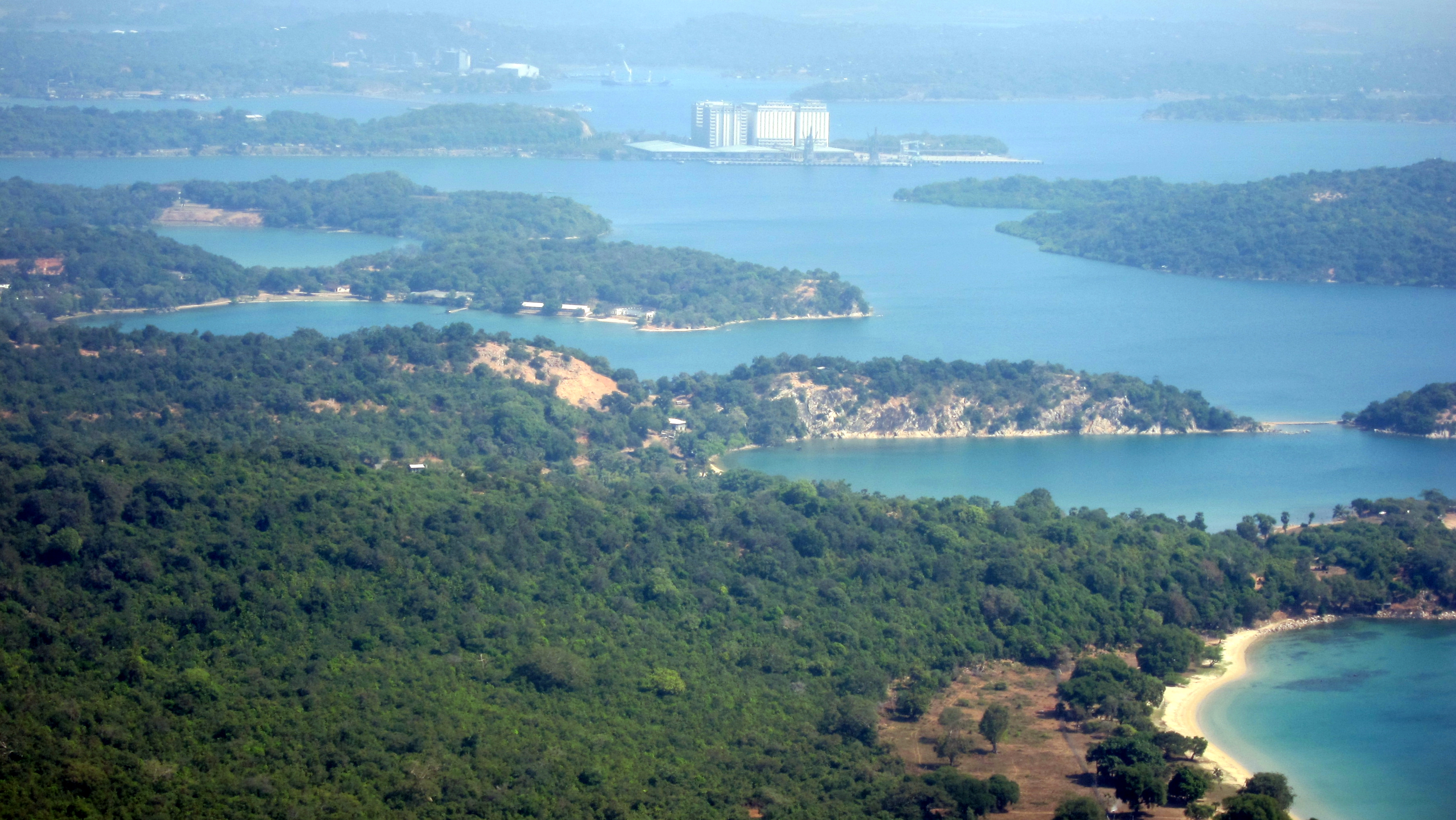
- Trincomalee Bay

- Location within Sri Lanka

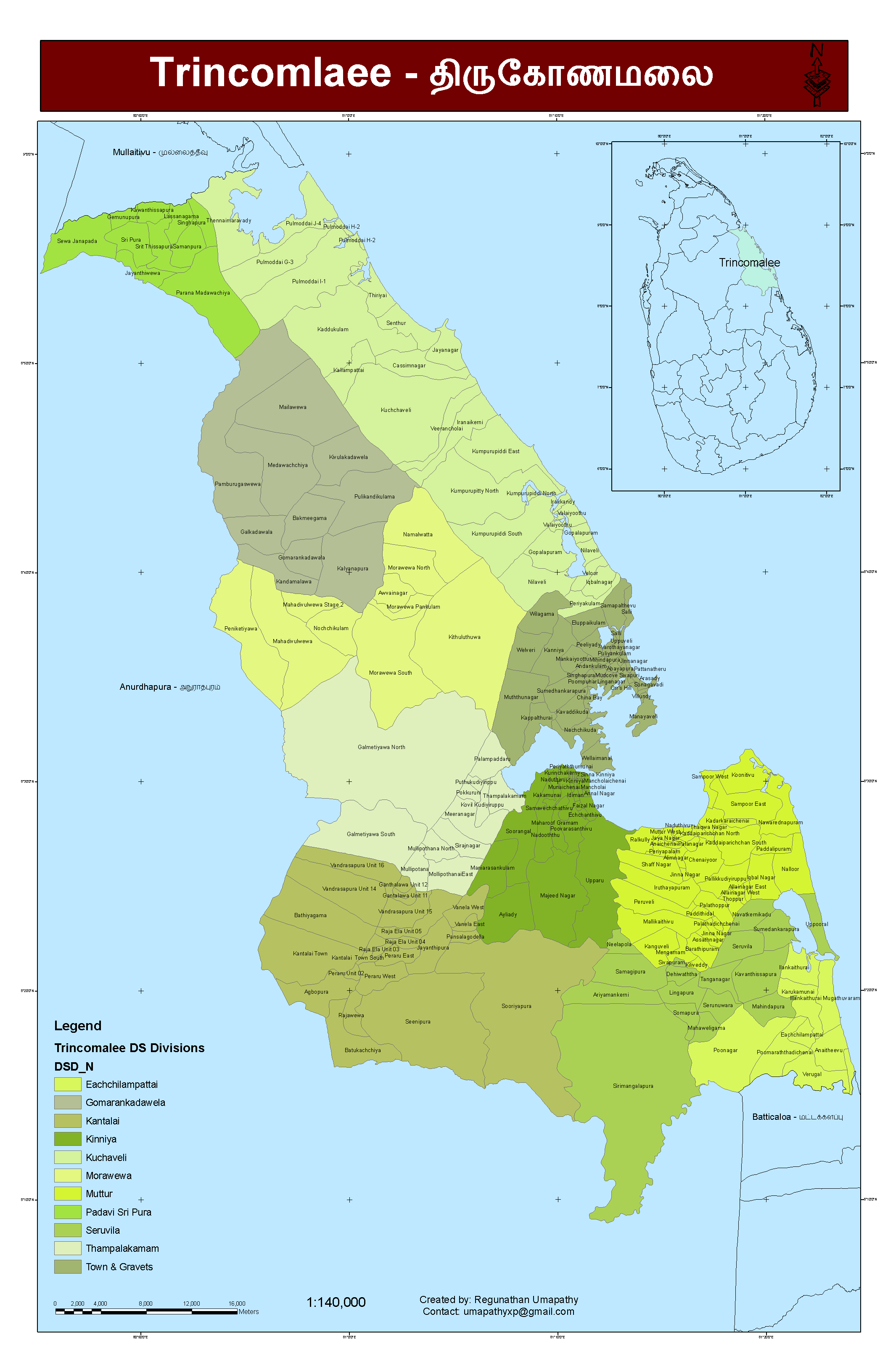
- Administrative units of Trincomalee District in 2006
- Coordinates: 08°35′N 81°05′E
- Country: Sri Lanka
- Province: Eastern
- Capital: Trincomalee
- DS Division: List: Gomarankadawala; Kantalai; Kinniya; Kuchchaveli; Morawewa; Muttur; Padavi Siripura; Seruvila; Thampalakamam; Trincomalee Town & Gravets; Verugal & Eachchalampattu

Government
  - District Secretary: J. S. D. M. Asanka Abeywardena
  - MPs: List: Maharoof; Susantha Punchinilame; R. Sampanthan; Imran maharoof
  - MPCs: List: A. W. G. M. Galappaththy; J. Janarthanan; K. P. P. P. Kumara; M. N. Abdul Majeed; A. R. Mohamed; S. L. M. H. Moulavi; K. Nageswaran; S. Thandayuthapani; N. G. W. M. J. Wijesekara

Area
  - Total: 2,727 km^{2} (1,053 sq mi)
  - Land: 2,529 km^{2} (976 sq mi)
  - Water: 198 km^{2} (76 sq mi) 7.26%
  - Rank: 11th (4.16% of total area)

Population (2012 census)
  - Total: 378,182
  - Rank: 21st (1.87% of total pop.)
  - Density: 149.5/km^{2} (387.3/sq mi)

Ethnicity (2012 census)
  - Moor: 163,982 (40.43%)
  - Sri Lankan Tamil: 115,549 (30.55%)
  - Sinhalese: 101,991 (26.97%)
  - Indian Tamil: 6,531 (1.73%)
  - Other: 1,257 (0.33%)

Religion (2012 census)
  - Muslim: 166,200 (42.12%)
  - Buddhist: 98,772 (26.12%)
  - Hindu: 98,133 (25.95%)
  - Christian: 21,892 (5.79%)
  - Other: 134 (0.04%)
- Time zone: UTC+05:30 (Sri Lanka)
- Post Codes: 31000-31999
- Telephone Codes: 026
- ISO 3166 code: LK-53
- Vehicle registration: EP
- Official Languages: Tamil, Sinhala
- Website: Trincomalee District Secretariat

Trincomalee District (Tamil: திருக்கோணமலை மாவட்டம் Tirukkōṇamalai Māvaṭṭam; Sinhala: ත්‍රිකුණාමළය දිස්ත්‍රික්කය Trikuṇāmalaya distrikkaya) is one of the 25 districts of Sri Lanka, the second level administrative division of the country. The district is administered by a District Secretariat headed by a District Secretary (previously known as a Government Agent) appointed by the central government of Sri Lanka. The capital of the district is the city of Trincomalee.

== Geography ==
Trincomalee District is located in the east of Sri Lanka in the Eastern Province. It has an area of 2,727 square kilometres (1,053 sq mi).

== Etymology ==
Early maps of Trincomalee

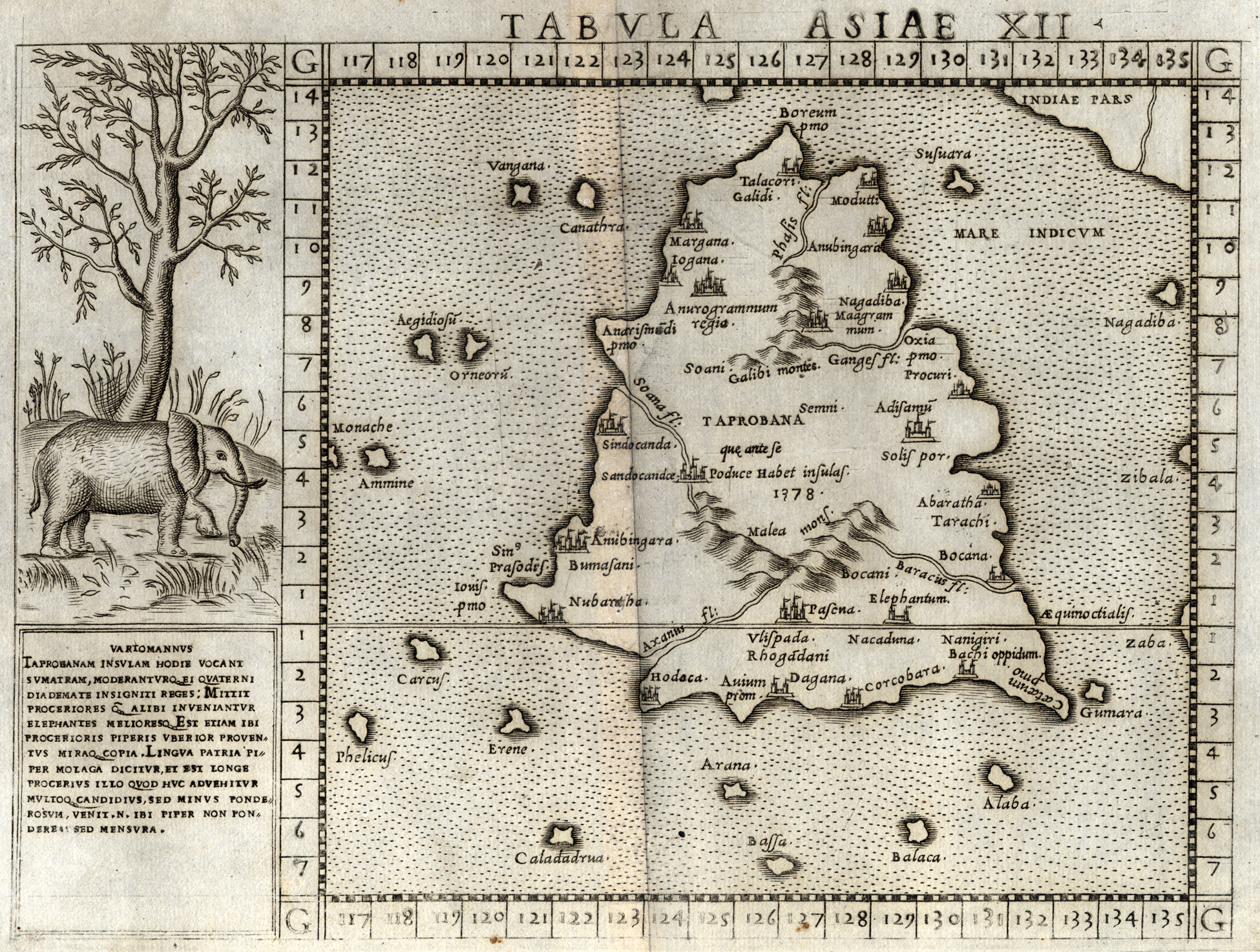
Ptolemy's map of Taprobana of 140 CE in a 1562 Ruscelli publication. From the Shiva footprint of Ulipada of Malea mountains (Sivan Oli Pada Malai) rises three rivers, including the Mavillie-Gangai (Mahavali-Ganges) whose tributary Barraces river's estuary into the Indian Ocean is just south of Bocana (Ko-Kannam bay) where the temple is illustrated. Just above, both cartographers mention Abaratha Ratchagar, another name of Lord Shiva – a temple with this name is also found in Aduthurai, Thanjavur, Tamil Nadu, near the early Chola capital.

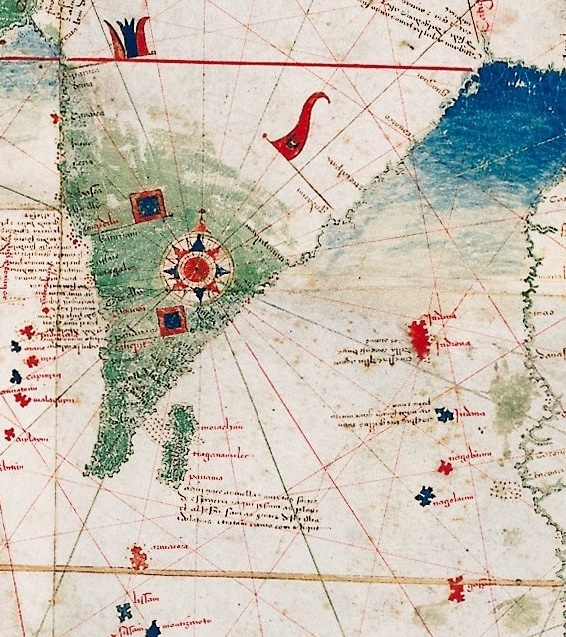
Cantino map of 1502, showing three Tamil towns on east coast, Mullaitivu, Trincomalee (Traganamalee) and Pannoam.

=== Trincomalee ===
The city has developed from a village settlement on the promontory dedicated to the Hindu shrine. The origin of the term Ko, Kone and Konatha lies in the Old Tamil word for the terms "Lord", "King" or "Chief", which allude to the deity that presides here; this term appears in several Tamil Brahmi inscriptions of the 6th century BCE — 2nd century CE. Trincomalee, the coastal peninsula town where Koneswaram is located is an anglicized form of the old Tamil word "Thiru-kona-malai" (Tamil: திருகோணமலை), meaning "Lord of the Sacred Hill", its earliest reference in this form found in the Tevaram of the 7th century by Sambandhar. Thiru is a generally used epithet denoting a "sacred" temple site while Malai means mountain or hill; Middle Tamil manuscripts and inscriptions mention the monumental compound shrine as the Thirukonamalai Konesar Kovil. Kona (Tamil: கோண) has other meanings in Old Tamil such as peak, while another origin for the term Koneswaram could come from the Tamil term Kuna (East). Therefore, other translators suggest definitions of Trincomalee such as "sacred angular/peaked hill", "sacred eastern hill" or "three peaked hill". The temple was constructed atop Swami Rock, also called Swami Malai or Kona-ma-malai, a cliff on the peninsula that drops 400 feet (120 metres) directly into the sea.

== Administrative units ==
Trincomalee District is divided into 11 Divisional Secretary's Division (DS Divisions), each headed by a Divisional Secretary (previously known as an Assistant Government Agent). The DS Divisions are further sub-divided into 230 Grama Niladhari Divisions (GN Divisions).

DS Division	Main Town	Divisional Secretary	GN Divisions	Area (km^{2})	Population (2012 Census)						Population Density (/km^{2})
DS Division	Main Town	Divisional Secretary	GN Divisions	Area (km^{2})	Sri Lankan Moors	Sri Lankan Tamil	Sinhalese	Indian Tamil	Other	Total	Population Density (/km^{2})
Gomarankadawala	Gomarankadawala	S. M. C. Samarakoon	10	288	1	25	7,313	0	0	7,339	25
Kantalai	Kantalai	K. Premadasha	23	404	5,108	1,534	37,448	2,478	73	46,641	115
Kinniya	Kinniya	M. A. Anas	31	165	58,447	2,522	19	3,445	18	64,451	391
Kuchchaveli	Kuchchaveli	P. Thaneswaran	24	438	21,307	10,553	1,193	40	7	33,100	76
Morawewa (Muthalikkulam)	Morawewa	W. M. Bathiya Vijayantha	10	329	1,300	888	5,750	3	5	7,946	24
Muttur	Muttur	V. Yoosuf	42	195	34,984	20,935	444	4	12	56,379	289
Padavi Siripura	Siripura	V. P. S. Jinadrasena	10	152	1	10	11,846	0	1	11,858	78
Seruvila	Seruvila	P. R. Jayarathna	17	311	2,426	1,816	9,293	3	8	13,546	44
Thampalakamam (Thambalagamuwa)	Thampalakamam	J. Sripathy	12	226	16,164	4,701	7,476	0	15	28,356	125
Trincomalee Town & Gravets	Trincomalee	J.H.Arulraj	42	148	13,113	61,282	21,179	546	1,114	97,234	657
Verugal & Eachchalampattu	Verugal	P. Thanesvaran	9	71	3	11,283	30	12	4	11,332	160
Total			230	2,727	152,854	115,549	101,991	6,531	1,257	378,182	139

== Demographics ==
=== Population ===
Trincomalee District's population was 378,182 in 2012.

The population of the district, like the rest of the east and north, has been heavily affected by the civil war. The war killed an estimated 100,000 people. Several hundred thousand Sri Lankan Tamils, possibly as much as one million, emigrated to the West during the war.

=== Ethnicity ===
Population of Trincomalee District by ethnic group 1827 to 2012
Year	Muslim (Note: Sri Lankan Moors and Indian Moors.)		Tamil (Note: Sri Lankan Tamil and Indian Tamil.)		Sinhalese		Other		Total No.
Year	No.	%	No.	%	No.	%	No.	%	Total No.
1827	3,245	16.94%	15,663	81.76%	250	1.30%	0	0.00%	19,158
1881 Census	5,746	25.89%	14,304	64.44%	935	4.21%	1,212	5.46%	22,197
1891 Census	6,426	24.96%	17,117	66.49%	1,105	4.29%	1,097	4.26%	25,745
1901 Census	8,258	29.04%	17,060	59.98%	1,203	4.23%	1,920	6.75%	28,441
1911 Census	9,700	32.60%	17,233	57.92%	1,138	3.82%	1,684	5.66%	29,755
1921 Census	12,846	37.66%	18,580	54.47%	1,501	4.40%	1,185	3.47%	34,112
1946 Census	23,219	30.58%	33,795	44.51%	11,606	15.29%	7,306	9.62%	75,926
1953 Census	28,616	34.10%	37,517	44.71%	15,296	18.23%	2,488	2.96%	83,917
1963 Census	40,775	29.43%	54,452	39.30%	39,925	28.82%	3,401	2.45%	138,553
1971 Census	59,924	31.83%	71,749	38.11%	54,744	29.08%	1,828	0.97%	188,245
1981 Census	75,039	29.32%	93,132	36.39%	85,503	33.41%	2,274	0.89%	255,948
2001 Census (Note: 2001 Census was only carried out partially in Trincomalee District.)	n/a	n/a	n/a	n/a	n/a	n/a	n/a	n/a	n/a
2007 Enumeration	151,692	45.37%	96,142	28.75%	84,766	25.35%	1,763	0.53%	334,363
2012 Census	152,854	40.42%	122,080	32.29%	101,991	26.97%	1,257	0.33%	378,182

=== Religion ===
Population of Trincomalee District by religion 1981 to 2012
Year	Islam		Buddhist		Hindu		Christian (Note: Roman Catholic and Other Christian.)		Others		Total No.
Year	No.	%	No.	%	No.	%	No.	%	No.	%	Total No.
1981 Census	76,404	29.85%	82,602	32.27%	80,843	31.59%	15,583	6.09%	516	0.20%	255,948
2012 Census	159,251	42.11%	98,772	26.12%	98,133	25.95%	21,892	5.79%	134	0.04%	378,182

=== Poverty ===
In 2016, the district was one of the poorest in Sri Lanka and had the third-highest incidence of extreme poverty according to the World Bank.

== Politics and government ==
=== Local government ===
Trincomalee District has 13 local authorities of which two are Urban Councils and the remaining 11 are Divisional Councils (Pradesha Sabhai or Pradeshiya Sabha).

Local Authority	Area	Population	Registered Electors (2011)	Elected Members (2011)				
Local Authority	Area	Population	Registered Electors (2011)	UPFA	TNA	UNP	Other	Total
Gomarankadawala Divisional Council			5,831	8	0	1	0	9
Kantalai Divisional Council	397.3	48,632	30,898	8	0	3	0	11
Kinniya Divisional Council			16,626	5	0	2	0	7
Kinniya Urban Council	9.5	44,034	21,069	5	0	1	1	7
Kuchchaveli Divisional Council	333.3	29,967	20,872	6	2	1	0	9
Morawewa Divisional Council	116.0	10,000	8,659	6	0	3	0	9
Muttur Divisional Council	179.4	60,000	37,731	7	3	1	0	11
Padavi Siripura Divisional Council	217.1	13,000	8,362	6	0	1	2	9
Seruvila Divisional Council	277.0	13,886	9,130	7	1	1	0	9
Thampalakamam Divisional Council	244.0	33,967	17,125	6	0	3	0	9
Trincomalee Town and Gravets Divisional Council			31,791	3	5	1	0	9
Trincomalee Urban Council	7.5	101,958	31,927	2	8	1	1	12
Verugal Divisional Council			5,894	1	5	0	1	7
Total			245,915	70	24	19	5	118
